= 2001–02 Debreceni VSC season =

Debrecen
2001–02 season
- Chairman: Gábor Szima
- Manager: János Pajkos (until 11 December 2001); László Dajka (from 11 December)
- Stadium: Oláh Gábor utcai Stadion
- Nemzeti Bajnokság I: 9th
- Magyar Kupa: Round of 16
- UEFA Cup: First round
- Highest home attendance: 7,000 (multiple competitive matches)
- Lowest home attendance: 1,500 v Videoton (28 November 2001, Magyar Kupa)
- Average home league attendance: 4,460
- Biggest win: 4–0 v Újpest (Home, 16 September 2001, Nemzeti Bajnokság I); 4–0 v Győr (Home, 25 May 2002, Nemzeti Bajnokság I)
- Biggest defeat: 1–6 v Zalaegerszeg (Home, 30 March 2002, Nemzeti Bajnokság I)

The 2001–02 season was Debreceni Vasutas Sport Club's 28th competitive season, 9th consecutive season in the Nemzeti Bajnokság I and 89th season in existence as a football club. In addition to the domestic league, Debrecen participated in this season's editions of the Magyar Kupa and the UEFA Cup.

== Squad ==
Squad at end of season

Note: Flags indicate national team as defined under FIFA eligibility rules; some limited exceptions apply. Players may hold more than one non-FIFA nationality.

No.	Pos.	Nation	Player
1	GK	HUN	Szabolcs Bíró
3	DF	HUN	Csaba Szatmári
6	DF	YUG	Ljubiša Aleksić
6	DF	HUN	János Szabó
8	FW	HUN	Zsombor Kerekes
9	MF	HUN	Zoltán Böőr
10	MF	USA	Raul Ovalle
10	DF	HUN	Tamás Szekeres
11	MF	HUN	Zsolt Vadicska
12	GK	HUN	János Balogh
14	DF	HUN	Viktor Hanák

No.	Pos.	Nation	Player
15	FW	HUN	Krisztián Tiber
18	FW	HUN	Péter Bajzát
19	DF	HUN	Ferenc Frida
20	DF	HUN	Attila Plókai
21	MF	HUN	György Turján
22	MF	HUN	Csaba Bernáth
26	DF	HUN	Attila Kuttor
27	MF	GEO	Kakhaber Chkhetiani
28	FW	SVK	Jozef Majoroš
29	FW	YUG	Vladimir Nenadić
30	FW	HUN	Zoltán Kiss

== Competitions ==
=== Overview ===
Competition	First match	Last match	Starting round	Final position	Record							
Competition	First match	Last match	Starting round	Final position	Pld	W	D	L	GF	GA	GD	Win %
Nemzeti Bajnokság I	14 July 2001	25 May 2002	Matchday 1	9th	38	9	17	12	47	53	−6	23.68
Magyar Kupa	10 October 2001	28 November 2001	Round of 32	Round of 16	2	1	0	1	6	4	+2	50.00
UEFA Cup	9 August 2001	27 September 2001	Qualifying round	First round	4	2	0	2	7	7	+0	50.00
Total					44	12	17	15	60	64	−4	27.27

Source: Competitions

=== Nemzeti Bajnokság I ===
==== Results summary ====
Overall								Home						Away					
Pld	W	D	L	GF	GA	GD	Pts	W	D	L	GF	GA	GD	W	D	L	GF	GA	GD
38	9	17	12	47	53	−6	44	6	10	4	33	28	+5	3	7	8	14	25	−11

Source: Matches

==== First stage ====
===== League table =====
Pos	Team	Pld	W	D	L	GF	GA	GD	Pts	Qualification
8	Győr	33	9	11	13	45	57	−12	38	Qualification for relegation playoff
9	Kispest Honvéd	33	10	8	15	40	63	−23	38	Qualification for relegation playoff
10	Debrecen	33	7	15	11	34	45	−11	36	Qualification for relegation playoff
11	Haladás	33	8	11	14	41	62	−21	35	Qualification for relegation playoff
12	Vasas	33	6	9	18	42	65	−23	27	Qualification for relegation playoff

Source: rsssf.com

===== Matches =====
14 July 2001 1	Győr	0–1	Debrecen	Győr
19:00 CEST (UTC+2)		Report	Tiber 40'; Vadicska (yellow card) 50'	Stadium: Stadion ETO; Attendance: 5,000; Referee: János Megyebíró; Assistant referees: R. Szabó, G. Koch

21 July 2001 2	Debrecen	0–1	Videoton	Debrecen
19:45 CEST (UTC+2)	Vadicska (yellow card) 53'; Plókai (yellow card) 67'; Bajzát (yellow card) 90+3'	Report	Bekő 8'; Csató (yellow card) 25'; Hamar (yellow card) 33'; Pomper (yellow card) 90+3'	Stadium: Oláh Gábor utcai Stadion; Attendance: 6,000; Referee: Zsolt Szabó; Assistant referees: Veres, Ortó

28 July 2001 3	Debrecen	0–3	MTK	Debrecen
19:00 CEST (UTC+2)	Bajzát (yellow card) 18'; Szatmári (yellow card) 63'	Report	Jezdimirović (yellow card) 16'; Illés 32', 63' (pen.), (yellow card) 70' (yellow-red card) 87'; Győri 76'; Smiljanić (yellow card) 80'	Stadium: Oláh Gábor utcai Stadion; Attendance: 5,500; Referee: Ferenc Bede; Assistant referees: Székely, G. Kiss

4 August 2001 4	Dunaferr	4–0	Debrecen	Dunaújváros
17:00 CEST (UTC+2)	Tököli 10', 85', 89'; Penksa 14'	Report	Vadicska (yellow card) 42'; Bernáth (yellow card) 68'	Stadium: Dunaújvárosi Stadion; Attendance: 2,000; Referee: Attila Ábrahám; Assistant referees: Georgiu, Z. Kovács

12 August 2001 5	Debrecen	1–1	Zalaegerszeg	Debrecen
18:00 CEST (UTC+2)	Bajzát 43'; Majoroš (yellow card) 68'	Report	Kenesei (yellow card) 9'; Egressy (yellow card) 27'; B. Molnár (yellow card) 87'; Csóka (yellow card) 88'	Stadium: Oláh Gábor utcai Stadion; Attendance: 7,000; Referee: János Megyebíró; Assistant referees: Koch, Z. Szabó

18 August 2001 6	Haladás	1–1	Debrecen	Szombathely
19:00 CEST (UTC+2)	Preisinger 11'	Report	Tiber 60'; Chkhetiani (yellow card) 76'	Stadium: Rohonci út Attendance: 6,000; Referee: Tamás Arany; Assistant referees: Sóthy, Gyarmati

26 August 2001 7	Debrecen	2–2	Kispest-Honvéd	Debrecen
19:00 CEST (UTC+2)	Tiber 9'; Plókai (yellow card) 44'; Bajzát 66'; Bernáth (yellow card) 84'	Report	Dubecz (yellow card) 21'; Sasu 29'; Aranyos (yellow card) 34'; Gonçalves (yellow card) 37'; Pašić (yellow card) 42'; Balint 49'	Stadium: Oláh Gábor utcai Stadion; Attendance: 6,000; Referee: Attila Hajdó; Assistant referees: Veres, Ortó

8 September 2001 8	Ferencváros	0–1	Debrecen	Budapest
16:45 CEST (UTC+2)	Pinte (yellow card) 30'; Zombori (yellow card) 50'; Cheregi (red card) 90'	Report	Bernáth (yellow card) 18'; Chkhetiani (yellow card) 25'; Kuttor 73'; Vadicska (yellow card) 75'	Stadium: Üllői úti Stadion; Attendance: 6,202; Referee: Attila Juhos; Assistant referees: Vámos, B. Farkas

16 September 2001 9	Debrecen	4–0	Újpest	Debrecen
18:00 CEST (UTC+2)	Nenadić 6'; Szatmári (yellow card) 7'; Chkhetiani (yellow card) 39'; Plókai 45'; Tiber 58'; Böőr 66'	Report	Tokody (yellow card) 60'; Lőw (yellow card) 84'	Stadium: Oláh Gábor utcai Stadion; Attendance: 6,000; Referee: József Bukovics; Assistant referees: Vígh, Kelemen

23 September 2001 10	Vasas	1–1	Debrecen	Budapest
19:00 CEST (UTC+2)	Kerényi 30', (yellow card) 52'; Cvetković (yellow card) 45' (yellow-red card) 86'	Report	Vadicska (yellow card) 48'; Radojičić 87', (yellow card) 87'; Tiber (red card) 89'	Stadium: Illovszky Rudolf Stadion; Attendance: 2,500; Referee: Attila Hanacsek; Assistant referees: Gyarmati, G. Kiss

30 September 2001 11	Debrecen	1–0	Sopron	Debrecen
18:00 CEST (UTC+2)	Majoroš (yellow card) 37', (goal) 68'	Report	Sălăgean (yellow card) 28'; M. Tóth (yellow card) 39'; G. Vincze (yellow card) 55'; K. Varga (yellow card) 58'	Stadium: Oláh Gábor utcai Stadion; Attendance: 5,000; Referee: János Megyebíró; Assistant referees: Hrabovszky, Kormos

13 October 2001 12	Debrecen	1–1	Győr	Debrecen
17:00 CEST (UTC+2)	Plókai 52'	Report	Vasas (yellow card) 33'; Oross 82'	Stadium: Oláh Gábor utcai Stadion; Attendance: 6,000; Referee: Attila Hajdó; Assistant referees: Koch, Veres

20 October 2001 13	Videoton	3–1	Debrecen	Székesfehérvár
18:00 CEST (UTC+2)	Pomper 13'; Földes (yellow card) 27'; Szalai (yellow card) 45'; Terjék 75'; Gajić 81'	Report	Nenadić 64'; Bajzát (yellow card) 74'	Stadium: Sóstói Stadion; Attendance: 2,000; Referee: Zoltán Szarka; Assistant referees: Mező, P. Szabó

23 October 2001 14	MTK	1–0	Debrecen	Budapest
18:00 CEST (UTC+2)	Komlósi (yellow card) 26'; Illés 45' (pen.)	Report	Vadicska (yellow card) 10'; Bernáth (yellow card) 55'	Stadium: Hidegkuti Nándor Stadion; Attendance: 3,000; Referee: Attila Ábrahám; Assistant referees: Balajti, Georgiu

27 October 2001 15	Debrecen	2–2	Dunaferr	Debrecen
17:00 CEST (UTC+2)	Nenadić 77'; Plókai (red card) 78'; Bernáth (yellow card) 90'; Bajzát 90+4'	Report	G. Kiss 12'; Tököli 55', (yellow card) 82'	Stadium: Oláh Gábor utcai Stadion; Attendance: 4,500; Referee: Viktor Kassai; Assistant referees: Tompos, Répássy

3 November 2001 16	Zalaegerszeg	3–1	Debrecen	Zalaegerszeg
17:00 CET (UTC+1)	Egressy 18', 65'; Waltner 90+1'	Report	Nenadić 15'	Stadium: ZTE Stadion; Attendance: 9,500; Referee: Attila Juhos; Assistant referees: Ring, Solymosi

10 November 2001 17	Debrecen	2–0	Haladás	Debrecen
16:00 CET (UTC+1)	Plókai 47'; Bernáth (yellow card) 71'; Kerekes 90+2' (pen.)	Report	G. Nagy (yellow card) 58'; Somfalvi (yellow card) 87'	Stadium: Oláh Gábor utcai Stadion; Attendance: 3,500; Referee: József Bukovics; Assistant referees: Harsányi, Ortó

17 November 2001 18	Kispest-Honvéd	1–1	Debrecen	Budapest
13:00 CET (UTC+1)	Aranyos (yellow card) 40'; Sasu 52'	Report	Hanák (yellow card) 12'; Majoroš 29', (yellow card) 85'; Plókai (yellow card) 51'	Stadium: Bozsik József Stadion; Attendance: 1,000; Referee: János Drucskó; Assistant referees: Kalmár, Székely

20 November 2001 19	Debrecen	0–1	Ferencváros	Debrecen
18:00 CET (UTC+1)	Aleksić (yellow card) 39'; Bajzát (yellow card) 64'	Report	Gyepes 34'; Lipcsei (yellow card) 40'; Hrutka (yellow card) 45'; Fülöp (yellow card) 65'; Cheregi (yellow card) 87'	Stadium: Oláh Gábor utcai Stadion; Attendance: 6,000; Referee: Zsolt Szabó; Assistant referees: Kormos, László

24 November 2001 20	Újpest	2–2	Debrecen	Budapest
18:00 CET (UTC+1)	Tamási (yellow card) 32', (goal) 62'; Pető (yellow card) 43'; Frunză 72'	Report	Aleksić (yellow card) 37'; Chkhetiani 45', (yellow card) 61'; Nenadić (yellow card) 90+1'; Kerekes 90+2'	Stadium: Megyeri úti stadion Attendance: 800; Referee: János Makai; Assistant referees: Vámos, Ábrahám

1 December 2001 21	Debrecen	2–2	Vasas	Debrecen
15:00 CET (UTC+1)	Tiber 25'; Majoroš (yellow card) 34'; Plókai (yellow card) 59'; Nenadić 72'	Report	Zrilić 9', 41'; Hegedűs (yellow card) 14'; André (yellow card) 50'	Stadium: Oláh Gábor utcai Stadion; Attendance: 3,000; Referee: János Megyebíró; Assistant referees: Hrabovszky, Z. Szabó

5 December 2001 22	Sopron	2–2	Debrecen	Sopron
13:00 CET (UTC+1)	R. Horváth 19'; Szabados (yellow card) 42'; G. Vincze (yellow card) 60'; Somogyi 80'; T. Nagy (yellow card) 80'	Report	Tiber 1'; Plókai (yellow card) 16'; Chkhetiani (yellow card) 50'; Ulveczki (yellow card) 55'; Majoroš (yellow card) 87'; Nenadić (yellow card) 89', (goal) 90'	Stadium: Káposztás utcai Stadion; Attendance: 2,000; Referee: Zoltán Szarka; Assistant referees: L. Varga II, R. Szabó

2 March 2002 23	Győr	2–1	Debrecen	Győr
15:00 CET (UTC+1)	Szanyó 12', 38'; Böjte (red card) 76'; Lakos (yellow card) 85'	Report	Böőr 34'; Bernáth (yellow card) 73'	Stadium: Stadion ETO; Attendance: 3,500; Referee: Zoltán Szarka; Assistant referees: Boda, P. Szabó

9 March 2002 24	Debrecen	0–0	Videoton	Debrecen
16:30 CET (UTC+1)		Report	Tímár (yellow card) 29'; Daniel (yellow card) 47'	Stadium: Oláh Gábor utcai Stadion; Attendance: 4,000; Referee: János Megyebíró; Assistant referees: Tompos, Székely

16 March 2002 25	Debrecen	4–3	MTK	Debrecen
16:30 CET (UTC+1)	Bajzát 20', 59'; Szekeres (yellow card) 61'; Böőr 84'; Kuttor (yellow card) 90'; Nenadić 90+2'	Report	Illés 48'; Zavadszky 55'; R. Juhász 81'	Stadium: Oláh Gábor utcai Stadion; Attendance: 4,000; Referee: Viktor Kassai; Assistant referees: Kormos, G. Kiss

23 March 2002 26	Dunaferr	0–0	Debrecen	Dunaújváros
15:00 CET (UTC+1)	Lengyel (yellow card) 90+1'	Report		Stadium: Eszperantó úti Stadion; Attendance: 1,500; Referee: János Makai; Assistant referees: Ákos, Heibl

30 March 2002 27	Debrecen	1–6	Zalaegerszeg	Debrecen
16:30 CET (UTC+1)	Böőr 7'; Kerekes (yellow card) 34'; Kuttor (yellow card) 42'	Report	Waltner 16', 89'; Szamosi (yellow card) 35'; Egressy 52'; La. Nagy 68', 71'; B. Molnár (yellow card) 70'; Kenesei 81'	Stadium: Oláh Gábor utcai Stadion; Attendance: 5,000; Referee: Zsolt Szabó; Assistant referees: Kispál, Hegyi

6 April 2002 28	Haladás	1–0	Debrecen	Szombathely
19:00 CEST (UTC+2)	Alex 90+2'	Report	Bajzát (yellow card) 74'	Stadium: Rohonci út Attendance: 6,000; Referee: Róbert Szabó; Assistant referees: Ring, S. Puskás

10 April 2002 29	Debrecen	0–0	Kispest-Honvéd	Debrecen
18:00 CEST (UTC+2)	Plókai (yellow card) 60'; Turján (yellow card) 86'	Report	Dubecz (yellow card) 30'; Lőrincz (yellow card) 43'; N. Németh (yellow card) 61' (yellow-red card) 64'	Stadium: Oláh Gábor utcai Stadion; Attendance: 3,000; Referee: József Bukovics; Assistant referees: Mohácsi, Ortó

13 April 2002 30	Ferencváros	0–1	Debrecen	Budapest
16:30 CEST (UTC+2)	Dragóner (yellow card) 90'	Report	Hanák (yellow card) 13'; Majoroš (yellow card) 68'; Z. Balog 80' (o.g.); Kuttor (yellow card) 86'	Stadium: Üllői úti Stadion; Attendance: 6,465; Referee: Attila Ábrahám; Assistant referees: Georgiou, Kalmár

20 April 2002 31	Debrecen	1–1	Újpest	Debrecen
18:30 CEST (UTC+2)	Bajzát (yellow card) 16'; Bernáth (yellow card) 20'; Szekeres 60'	Report	Tokody 29'; Erős (yellow card) 64'; Vágner (yellow card) 77'	Stadium: Oláh Gábor utcai Stadion; Attendance: 4,700; Referee: Attila Hajdó; Assistant referees: Hrabovszky, Tóth L.

24 April 2002 32	Vasas	1–0	Debrecen	Budapest
18:30 CEST (UTC+2)	Zabos (yellow card) 66'; Váczi 73'	Report	Chkhetiani (yellow card) 44'	Stadium: Illovszky Rudolf Stadion; Attendance: 2,000; Referee: János Megyebíró; Assistant referees: Gyarmati, Tompos

27 April 2002 33	Debrecen	0–0	Sopron	Debrecen
18:00 CEST (UTC+2)	Majoroš (yellow card) 41'	Report	G. Vincze (yellow card) 41'	Stadium: Oláh Gábor utcai Stadion; Attendance: 2,800; Referee: Balázs Világi; Assistant referees: Kispál, Veres

==== Second stage ====
===== Relegation playoff =====
Pos	Team	Pld	W	D	L	GF	GA	GD	Pts	Qualification or relegation
7	Kispest Honvéd	38	12	11	15	51	70	−19	47	Qualification for Intertoto Cup first round
8	Sopron	38	10	14	14	54	60	−6	44	
9	Debrecen	38	9	17	12	47	53	−6	44	
10	Győr	38	10	14	14	51	64	−13	44	
11	Haladás (R)	38	9	13	16	48	71	−23	40	Relegation to Nemzeti Bajnokság II
12	Vasas (R)	38	7	11	20	51	78	−27	32	Relegation to Nemzeti Bajnokság II

Source: rsssf.com
(R) Relegated

====== Matches ======
4 May 2002 34	Debrecen	2–2	Haladás	Debrecen
19:00 CEST (UTC+2)	Chkhetiani 52', (yellow card) 57'; Böőr (yellow card) 67'; T. Takács 76' (o.g.)	Report	Szekér (yellow card) 58'; Leandro 67'; Filipović 73'; Preisinger (not on pitch) (red card) 78'; Halmosi (yellow card) 80'; G. Nagy (yellow card) 84'; Kaj (yellow card) 90+1'	Stadium: Oláh Gábor utcai Stadion; Attendance: 2,500; Referee: Viktor Kassai; Assistant referees: Koch, Székely

11 May 2002 35	Debrecen	6–3	Vasas	Debrecen
19:00 CEST (UTC+2)	Nenadić 8', 43'; Z. Kiss 56'; Böőr 58', 88'; Bernáth (yellow card) 74'; Szekeres 90+2'	Report	Árki (yellow card) 19'; Bükszegi 30', 85', 90+1'; Schindler (yellow card) 50'	Stadium: Oláh Gábor utcai Stadion; Attendance: 2,000; Referee: Zsolt Szabó; Assistant referees: Vámos, T. Vígh

18 May 2002 36	Sopron	1–1	Debrecen	Sopron
17:00 CEST (UTC+2)	Pintér (yellow card) 48'; I. Tóth 50'	Report	Majoroš (yellow card) 31'; Chkhetiani 81'; Kerekes (yellow card) 90'	Stadium: Káposztás utcai Stadion; Attendance: 3,500; Referee: Attila Juhos; Assistant referees: T. Gyarmati, Saskőy

22 May 2002 37	Kispest-Honvéd	2–0	Debrecen	Budapest
19:00 CEST (UTC+2)	Sasu 9' (pen.), 70'; Füzi (yellow card) 25'; Dulca (yellow card) 56'	Report	Bíró (yellow card) 9'; Szekeres (yellow card) 29'; Vadicska (yellow card) 48'; Majoroš (yellow card) 77'	Stadium: Bozsik József Stadion; Attendance: 600; Referee: János Megyebíró; Assistant referees: Hrabovszky, Kormos

25 May 2002 38	Debrecen	4–0	Győr	Debrecen
17:00 CEST (UTC+2)	Szekeres 8'; Nenadić 35', 61', (yellow card) 67'; Turján (yellow card) 65'; Kerekes 72'	Report		Stadium: Oláh Gábor utcai Stadion; Attendance: 2,700; Referee: Zsolt Szabó; Assistant referees: Vámos, Koch

=== Magyar Kupa ===
10 October 2001 Round of 32	Kalocsa	2–5	Debrecen	Kalocsa
14:30 CEST (UTC+2)	Bolvári (yellow card); J. Kovács 58'; Á. Pákolicz 82'	Report	Hanák 11'; Kerekes 41'; Tiber 42'; Böőr 55'; Chkhetiani 88'	Stadium: Városi Sporttelep; Attendance: 800; Referee: János Makai; Assistant referees: Ráthgéber, Z. Rácz

28 November 2001 Round of 16	Debrecen	1–2 (a.e.t.)	Videoton	Debrecen
14:00 CET (UTC+1)	Plókai (yellow card) 40'; Bajzát (yellow card) 44'; Kerekes 63'; Böőr (yellow card) 83'	Report	Szalai (yellow card) 35'; Terjék 89'; Gajić 95'	Stadium: Oláh Gábor utcai Stadion; Attendance: 1,500; Referee: Ferenc Bede; Assistant referees: Tompos, Vígh

=== UEFA Cup ===
==== Qualifying round ====
9 August 2001 First leg	Debrecen (Hungary)	3–0	(Moldova) Nistru Otaci	Debrecen, Hungary
20:15 CEST (UTC+2)	Bajzát 25', (yellow card) 27'; Ulveczki 35'; Kovács (yellow card) 66'; Tiber 82'	Report	Lupașcu (yellow card) 22'; Arabadji (yellow card) 30'; Lașcencov (yellow card) 81' (red card) 81'	Stadium: Oláh Gábor utcai Stadion; Attendance: 3,200

23 August 2001 Second leg	Nistru Otaci (Moldova)	1–0 (1–3 agg.)	(Hungary) Debrecen	Chișinău, Moldova
20:00 EEST (UTC+3)	Chmakov 53' (pen.); Hroshev (yellow card) 54'; Tcaciuc (yellow card) 66'; Kopystyanskyy (yellow card) 83'	Report	Bajzát (yellow card) 35'; Chkhetiani (yellow card) 57'	Stadium: Republican Stadium; Attendance: 3,500
Note: Debrecen won 3–1 on aggregate.

==== First round ====
20 September 2001 First leg	Bordeaux (France)	5–1	(Hungary) Debrecen	Bordeaux, France
21:00 CEST (UTC+2)	Pauleta 12', 76'; Christian 42'; Dugarry 51', 54'	Report	Tiber 39'	Stadium: Stade Chaban-Delmas; Attendance: 13,958

27 September 2001 Second leg	Debrecen (Hungary)	3–1 (4–6 agg.)	(France) Bordeaux	Debrecen, Hungary
17:30 CEST (UTC+2)	Plókai 43', (yellow card) 70'; Kerekes 58' (pen.), 65'; Bernáth (yellow card) 84'	Report	Ramé (yellow card) 58'; Pauleta 74'	Stadium: Oláh Gábor utcai Stadion; Attendance: 7,000
Note: Bordeaux won 6–4 on aggregate.
