= 2001–02 Haladás VFC season =

Haladás
2001–02 season
- Manager: Ferenc Keszei (until 26 November 2001); Mihály Nagy (caretaker, from 26 November to 3 January 2002); Lázár Szentes (from 3 January)
- Stadium: Rohonci út
- Nemzeti Bajnokság I: 11th (relegated)
- Magyar Kupa: Runners-up
- Highest home attendance: 8,000 v Ferencváros (17 November 2001, Nemzeti Bajnokság I)
- Lowest home attendance: 1,500 v Celldömölk (10 October 2001, Magyar Kupa)
- Average home league attendance: 5,667
- Biggest win: 8–1 v Gellénháza (Away, 18 September 2001, Magyar Kupa)
- Biggest defeat: 0–5 v MTK (Home, 21 September 2001, Nemzeti Bajnokság I); 1–6 v Kispest-Honvéd (Away, 13 October 2001, Nemzeti Bajnokság I); 0–5 v Ferencváros (Away, 10 April 2002, Nemzeti Bajnokság I)

The 2001–02 season was Haladás VFC's 50th competitive season, 84th season in existence as a football club and first season in the Nemzeti Bajnokság I after winning the West group of the second division in the previous season. In addition to the domestic league, Haladás participated in that season's editions of the Magyar Kupa.

== Squad ==
Squad at end of season

Note: Flags indicate national team as defined under FIFA eligibility rules; some limited exceptions apply. Players may hold more than one non-FIFA nationality.

No.	Pos.	Nation	Player
1	GK	HUN	Kornél Kurucsai
2	MF	SRB	Nenad Janković
3	DF	BRA	Flávio Pim
4	DF	HUN	Balázs Czeglédi
5	DF	HUN	István Szekér
6	DF	HUN	András Horváth
7	MF	HUN	András Kaj
8	MF	HUN	László Nagy
9	FW	BIH	Almir Filipović
10	DF	BRA	Leandro
11	FW	BRA	Alex
12	GK	HUN	Tamás Takács
13	DF	HUN	Tibor Selymes

No.	Pos.	Nation	Player
14	MF	HUN	Csaba Somfalvi
15	DF	HUN	Péter Tóth
16	MF	HUN	Tamás Németh
17	GK	HUN	Gábor Sipos
18	MF	HUN	Péter Halmosi
19	MF	HUN	Tihamér Lukács
20	FW	BRA	Fred
21	DF	HUN	Tamás Juhász
23	FW	HUN	Sándor Preisinger
24	MF	BRA	Japa
26	DF	HUN	Gábor Nagy
27	DF	HUN	Tibor Horváth
29	MF	HUN	László Némethy

== Competitions ==
=== Overview ===
Competition	First match	Last match	Starting round	Final position	Record							
Competition	First match	Last match	Starting round	Final position	Pld	W	D	L	GF	GA	GD	Win %
Nemzeti Bajnokság I	14 July 2001	25 May 2002	Matchday 1	11th	38	9	13	16	48	71	−23	23.68
Magyar Kupa	18 September 2001	1 May 2002	Second round	Runners-up	6	3	2	1	16	7	+9	50.00
Total					44	12	15	17	64	78	−14	27.27

Source: Competitions

=== Nemzeti Bajnokság I ===
==== Results summary ====
Overall								Home						Away					
Pld	W	D	L	GF	GA	GD	Pts	W	D	L	GF	GA	GD	W	D	L	GF	GA	GD
38	9	13	16	48	71	−23	40	8	5	5	24	24	0	1	8	11	24	47	−23

==== First stage ====
===== League table =====
Pos	Team	Pld	W	D	L	GF	GA	GD	Pts	Qualification
8	Győr	33	9	11	13	45	57	−12	38	Qualification for relegation playoff
9	Kispest Honvéd	33	10	8	15	40	63	−23	38	Qualification for relegation playoff
10	Debrecen	33	7	15	11	34	45	−11	36	Qualification for relegation playoff
11	Haladás	33	8	11	14	41	62	−21	35	Qualification for relegation playoff
12	Vasas	33	6	9	18	42	65	−23	27	Qualification for relegation playoff

Source: rsssf.com

===== Matches =====
14 July 2001 1	Haladás	1–0	Kispest-Honvéd	Szombathely
19:45 CEST (UTC+2)	Preisinger 12'	Report	Babos (yellow card) 69' (yellow-red card) 79'	Stadium: Rohonci út Attendance: 5,000; Referee: Viktor Kassai; Assistant referees: Répássy, Erős

21 July 2001 2	Újpest	1–1	Haladás	Budapest
19:00 CEST (UTC+2)	Dvéri 35'; Erős (yellow card) 80'	Report	Preisinger 27'; Pim (yellow card) 38'; G. Nagy (yellow card) 68'	Stadium: Megyeri úti stadion Attendance: 3,000; Referee: Attila Dubraviczky; Assistant referees: Gyarmati, Varga II

28 July 2001 3	Haladás	2–1	Sopron	Szombathely
19:45 CEST (UTC+2)	Filipović 87', 90'	Report	Sira (yellow card) 4'; M. Tóth 7'; Somogyi (yellow card) 59'; Orabinec (yellow card) 74'	Stadium: Rohonci út Attendance: 6,000; Referee: Attila Ábrahám; Assistant referees: Georgiu, Balajti

4 August 2001 4	Videoton	1–0	Haladás	Székesfehérvár
20:00 CEST (UTC+2)	Hamar (yellow card) 26'; Terjék 83'	Report	P. Tóth (yellow card) 19' (yellow-red card) 40'; Filipović (yellow card) 57'	Stadium: Sóstói Stadion; Attendance: 3,000; Referee: Csaba Sápi; Assistant referees: Kormos, Mező

12 August 2001 5	Haladás	2–0	Dunaferr	Szombathely
19:45 CEST (UTC+2)	A. Horváth 28'; Fred 37'; G. Nagy (yellow card) 55'; Preisinger (yellow card) 90'	Report	Bagoly (yellow card) 56'; Nikolov (yellow card) 86'; Zováth (yellow card) 87'	Stadium: Rohonci út Attendance: 7,000; Referee: Zsolt Szabó; Assistant referees: Kispál, Böröczi

18 August 2001 6	Haladás	1–1	Debrecen	Szombathely
19:00 CEST (UTC+2)	Preisinger 11'	Report	Tiber 60'; Chkhetiani (yellow card) 76'	Stadium: Rohonci út Attendance: 6,000; Referee: Tamás Arany; Assistant referees: Sóthy, Gyarmati

24 August 2001 7	Ferencváros	3–1	Haladás	Budapest
18:15 CEST (UTC+2)	Pinte 10'; Hrutka (yellow card) 32'; Gera 60'; Jović 84'	Report	G. Nagy (yellow card) 39' (yellow-red card) 80'; Preisinger 71'; Leandro (yellow card) 73'	Stadium: Üllői úti Stadion; Attendance: 7,449; Referee: Béla Kiss; Assistant referees: G. Kiss, Saskőy

7 September 2001 8	Haladás	1–0	Vasas	Szombathely
18:00 CEST (UTC+2)	Preisinger 9', (yellow card) 52'; Suriel (yellow card) 40'; B. Takács (yellow card) 90'	Report	Szili (yellow card) 50'; Zrilić (yellow card) 59' (red card) 80'; Zabos (yellow card) 64'	Stadium: Rohonci út Attendance: 6,000; Referee: Attila Dubraviczky; Assistant referees: P. Kovács, T. Ábrahám

15 September 2001 9	Győr	3–3	Haladás	Győr
19:00 CEST (UTC+2)	Nychenko (yellow card) 27'; Szanyó 38', 73'; Dulcea 51'; Golović (yellow card) 77'; Vasas (yellow card) 84'	Report	Preisinger 70'; Filipović 71'; L. Nagy 82'; Némethy (yellow card) 90'	Stadium: Stadion ETO; Attendance: 1,500; Referee: Viktor Kassai; Assistant referees: R. Szabó, Répássy

21 September 2001 10	Haladás	0–5	MTK	Szombathely
18:00 CEST (UTC+2)		Report	Ferenczi 4', 61', 70'; Komlósi (yellow card) 18'; Czvitkovics 42'; Illés 66'	Stadium: Rohonci út Attendance: 7,000; Referee: Attila Juhos; Assistant referees: Világi, G. Kiss

28 September 2001 11	Zalaegerszeg	3–1	Haladás	Zalaegerszeg
18:00 CEST (UTC+2)	Egressy 29'; Waltner 34'; Balog (yellow card) 81'; Bonchiş 90'	Report	L. Nagy 66'	Stadium: ZTE Stadion; Attendance: 8,000; Referee: Attila Ábrahám; Assistant referees: Mészáros, Balajti

13 October 2001 12	Kispest-Honvéd	6–1	Haladás	Budapest
19:00 CEST (UTC+2)	Balint 3'; Pintér 60'; Aranyos (yellow card) 70'; Hercegfalvi 71'; Téger 79'; Piroska 87', 90+2'	Report	Leandro (yellow card) 22'; Juhász (yellow card) 25'; Halmosi (yellow card) 60'; Filipović 86'	Stadium: Bozsik József Stadion; Attendance: 1,500; Referee: Zsolt Szabó; Assistant referees: Ring, Erős

20 October 2001 13	Haladás	2–2	Újpest	Szombathely
16:30 CEST (UTC+2)	Filipović 21', (yellow card) 45'; Preisinger 26'; Juhász (yellow card) 63'; Arnon (yellow card) 90+1'	Report	Erős 4'; Tamási 79'	Stadium: Rohonci út Attendance: 5,000; Referee: Tamás Arany; Assistant referees: Vámosi, Répássy

24 October 2001 14	Sopron	1–1	Haladás	Sopron
14:30 CEST (UTC+2)	M. Tóth 10'; T. Nagy (yellow card) 40'; G. Vincze (yellow card) 53'	Report	Preisinger 25', (yellow card) 73'; Némethy (yellow card) 37'; Japa (yellow card) 50'; B. Takács (yellow card) 79'	Stadium: Káposztás utcai Stadion; Attendance: 2,500; Referee: Béla Kiss; Assistant referees: T. Gyarmati I, L. Varga II

27 October 2001 15	Haladás	0–0	Videoton	Szombathely
18:00 CEST (UTC+2)	Filipović (penalty missed) 24', (red card) 67'; L. Nagy (yellow card) 44'; G. Nagy (yellow card) 54'	Report	Földes (yellow card) 67'	Stadium: Rohonci út Attendance: 6,000; Referee: János Makai; Assistant referees: Mező, Ákos

4 November 2001 16	Dunaferr	2–2	Haladás	Dunaújváros
12:30 CET (UTC+1)	Lengyel 26', 57'	Report	Leandro 43'; Némethy (yellow card) 51'; Halmosi 67'	Stadium: Dunaújvárosi Stadion; Attendance: 3,000; Referee: Attila Hajdó; Assistant referees: Hrabovszky, Veres

10 November 2001 17	Debrecen	2–0	Haladás	Debrecen
16:00 CET (UTC+1)	Plókai 47'; Bernáth (yellow card) 71'; Kerekes 90+2' (pen.)	Report	G. Nagy (yellow card) 58'; Somfalvi (yellow card) 87'	Stadium: Oláh Gábor utcai Stadion; Attendance: 3,500; Referee: József Bukovics; Assistant referees: Harsányi, Ortó

17 November 2001 18	Haladás	1–3	Ferencváros	Szombathely
16:20 CET (UTC+1)	Leandro 57' (pen.)	Report	Gyepes 16'; Kriston (yellow card) 67'; Fülöp (yellow card) 73'; Jović 90', 90+1'	Stadium: Rohonci út Attendance: 8,000; Referee: Attila Ábrahám; Assistant referees: Balajti, T. Gyarmati I

21 November 2001 19	Vasas	2–1	Haladás	Budapest
16:00 CET (UTC+1)	Maróti 3'; Zrilić 33'; Szili (yellow card) 42'; Hegedűs (yellow card) 43'; Juhár (yellow card) 83'; Kovrig (yellow card) 90'	Report	Somfalvi (yellow card) 45'; Japa 52'; Arnon (yellow card) 90+1'	Stadium: Illovszky Rudolf Stadion; Attendance: 1,000; Referee: Attila Dubraviczky; Assistant referees: G. Kiss, Tompos

24 November 2001 20	Haladás	1–2	Győr	Szombathely
18:00 CET (UTC+1)	Juhász (yellow card) 20'; Somfalvi (yellow card) 29'; Filipović (red card) 58'; Arnon 68'	Report	Golović (yellow card) 20'; Szanyó 58' (pen.); Bajúsz (yellow card) 66'; Mracskó (yellow card) 73'; G. Nagy 87' (o.g.); Vayer (yellow card) 88'	Stadium: Rohonci út Attendance: 3,500; Referee: Attila Juhos; Assistant referees: Kispál, Világi

1 December 2001 21	MTK	5–1	Haladás	Budapest
17:00 CET (UTC+1)	Zavadszky 3'; Czvitkovics 25'; Ferenczi 32'; Komlósi (red card) 39'; Illés (yellow card) 43', (goal) 45', 75'; Elek (yellow card) 80'; L. Horváth (yellow card) 85'	Report	Japa 58', (yellow card) 66'	Stadium: Hidegkuti Nándor Stadion; Attendance: 1,000; Referee: Csaba Sápi; Assistant referees: Veres, Ortó

5 December 2001 22	Haladás	0–1	Zalaegerszeg	Szombathely
17:30 CET (UTC+1)	Juhász (yellow card) 10'; Kaj (yellow card) 12'; G. Nagy (yellow card) 40'; Suriel (red card) 85'	Report	Kenesei 33'; Kocsárdi (yellow card) 57'; La. Nagy (yellow card) 77'; B. Molnár (yellow card) 88'	Stadium: Rohonci út Attendance: 4,000; Referee: Ferenc Bede; Assistant referees: Székely, Erős

2 March 2002 23	Haladás	3–2	Kispest-Honvéd	Szombathely
17:00 CET (UTC+1)	Preisinger 15'; Alex 20'; Somfalvi (yellow card) 47'; P. Tóth 69'	Report	Dubecz (yellow card) 30'; Lászka (yellow card) 35'; Faragó 45'; Balint 65'; Füzi (yellow card) 76'	Stadium: Rohonci út Attendance: 7,000; Referee: Viktor Kassai; Assistant referees: Székely, Répássy

10 March 2002 24	Újpest	2–1	Haladás	Budapest
18:00 CET (UTC+1)	Lőw 15'; Túlio 48'; Tamási (yellow card) 60'; Korolovszky (yellow card) 86'	Report	Filipović (yellow card) 19', (goal) 59'; Preisinger (yellow card) 43'; Szekér (yellow card) 51'	Stadium: Megyeri úti stadion Attendance: 6,000; Referee: Csaba Sápi; Assistant referees: Ring, Kelemen

16 March 2002 25	Haladás	1–1	Sopron	Szombathely
17:00 CET (UTC+1)	Leandro 58' (pen.); Pim (red card) 62'; P. Tóth (red card) 90'	Report	G. Vincze (yellow card) 33' (yellow-red card) 65'; Sira 34'; Pintér (yellow card) 60'	Stadium: Rohonci út Attendance: 7,000; Referee: Attila Juhos; Assistant referees: Koch, Arany

22 March 2002 26	Videoton	2–2	Haladás	Székesfehérvár
17:45 CET (UTC+1)	Terjék 28'; Vilotić (yellow card) 43'; B. Kovács (yellow card) 78'; B. Tóth 84'; Némedi (yellow card) 88'; Dvéri (red card) 90+2'	Report	Kaj 3'; Preisinger (yellow card) 43'; Némethy 72'	Stadium: Sóstói Stadion; Attendance: 1,500; Referee: Balázs Világi; Assistant referees: Vámos, T. Vígh

29 March 2002 27	Haladás	3–1	Dunaferr	Szombathely
18:00 CET (UTC+1)	Janković (yellow card) 12'; Németh 35', 53'; Somfalvi (yellow card) 43'; Némethy (yellow card) 54'; Leandro (yellow card) 65'; Filipović (yellow card) 85'; Preisinger (yellow card) 90'; Pim 90'	Report	Nikolov (yellow card) 28'; Balaskó 45'; Salamon (yellow card) 47'; Éger (yellow card) 90'	Stadium: Rohonci út Attendance: 5,000; Referee: Attila Ábrahám; Assistant referees: Balajti, L. Varga II

6 April 2002 28	Haladás	1–0	Debrecen	Szombathely
19:00 CEST (UTC+2)	Alex 90+2'	Report	Bajzát (yellow card) 74'	Stadium: Rohonci út Attendance: 6,000; Referee: Róbert Szabó; Assistant referees: Ring, S. Puskás

10 April 2002 29	Ferencváros	5–0	Haladás	Budapest
19:00 CEST (UTC+2)	Kriston 11'; Gera 56'; Lipcsei 47'; Kapič 70'; Penksa 82'	Report	Pim (yellow card) 15'; Juhász (yellow card) 19'; P. Tóth (yellow card) 72'	Stadium: Üllői úti Stadion; Attendance: 5,478; Referee: János Megyebíró; Assistant referees: Tompos, Medovarszki

13 April 2002 30	Haladás	2–2	Vasas	Szombathely
19:00 CEST (UTC+2)	Alex 23'; Filipović 31'; Némethy (yellow card) 72'; P. Tóth (yellow card) 75'	Report	Gyánó 8'; Simek (yellow card) 19'; Váczi 30'; Makra (yellow card) 70'	Stadium: Rohonci út Attendance: 5,000; Referee: Béla Kiss; Assistant referees: Farkas, Répássy

20 April 2002 31	Győr	1–0	Haladás	Győr
17:00 CEST (UTC+2)	Szanyó (yellow card) 71'; B. Farkas II 86'	Report	Némethy (yellow card) 20'	Stadium: Stadion ETO; Attendance: 3,000; Referee: János Drucskó; Assistant referees: T. Arany, T. Végh

23 April 2002 32	Haladás	3–0	MTK	Szombathely
18:00 CEST (UTC+2)	Leandro 38' (pen.), 66'; Somfalvi (yellow card) 44'; Fred 45'; Kaj (yellow card) 48'; Selymes (yellow card) 73'	Report	Hajdu (yellow card) 38'; Branežac (yellow card) 78' (yellow-red card); Elek (yellow card) 79'	Stadium: Rohonci út Attendance: 4,500; Referee: Zsolt Szabó; Assistant referees: Kispál, Hegyi

27 April 2002 33	Zalaegerszeg	2–2	Haladás	Zalaegerszeg
19:00 CEST (UTC+2)	B. Molnár (yellow card) 6'; Waltner 46', (yellow card) 53'; Csóka (yellow card) 75'; Kenesei 81'	Report	Juhász (yellow card) 16'; Leandro 34'; Alex 58'; Némethy (yellow card) 78'; Szekér (yellow card) 82'; Janković (yellow card) 89'	Stadium: ZTE Stadion; Attendance: 9,000; Referee: Attila Ábrahám; Assistant referees: Balajti, Erős

==== Second stage ====
===== Relegation playoff =====
Pos	Team	Pld	W	D	L	GF	GA	GD	Pts	Qualification or relegation
7	Kispest Honvéd	38	12	11	15	51	70	−19	47	Qualification for Intertoto Cup first round
8	Sopron	38	10	14	14	54	60	−6	44	
9	Debrecen	38	9	17	12	47	53	−6	44	
10	Győr	38	10	14	14	51	64	−13	44	
11	Haladás (R)	38	9	13	16	48	71	−23	40	Relegation to Nemzeti Bajnokság II
12	Vasas (R)	38	7	11	20	51	78	−27	32	Relegation to Nemzeti Bajnokság II

Source: rsssf.com
(R) Relegated

====== Matches ======
4 May 2002 34	Debrecen	2–2	Haladás	Debrecen
19:00 CEST (UTC+2)	Chkhetiani 52', (yellow card) 57'; Böőr (yellow card) 67'; T. Takács 76' (o.g.)	Report	Szekér (yellow card) 58'; Leandro 67'; Filipović 73'; Preisinger (not on pitch) (red card) 78'; Halmosi (yellow card) 80'; G. Nagy (yellow card) 84'; Kaj (yellow card) 90+1'	Stadium: Oláh Gábor utcai Stadion; Attendance: 2,500; Referee: Viktor Kassai; Assistant referees: Koch, Székely

10 May 2002 35	Haladás	0–3 (awd.)	Győr	Szombathely
17:00 CEST (UTC+2)	Leandro (yellow card) 46'	Report	B. Farkas II (yellow card) 33'; Nychenko (yellow card) 83'	Stadium: Rohonci út Attendance: 4,000; Referee: János Makai; Assistant referees: Tompos, G. Kiss
Note: The match ended in a 0–0 draw, but following Győr's successful protest, after it was revealed that Haladás fielded six foreigner players simultaneously in breach of the regulations, the match was awarded to Győr.

18 May 2002 36	Kispest-Honvéd	1–1	Haladás	Budapest
18:30 CEST (UTC+2)	Babos (yellow card) 18'; Torghelle 23'	Report	Leandro 13'; Szekér (yellow card) 33' (yellow-red card) 72'; Juhász (yellow card) 45'; Filipović (yellow card) 82'; Somfalvi (red card) 82'	Stadium: Bozsik József Stadion; Attendance: 2,500; Referee: József Bukovics; Assistant referees: Ortó, Fábián

22 May 2002 37	Vasas	2–1	Haladás	Budapest
19:00 CEST (UTC+2)	Simek 33'; Hrutka 35'; A. Tóth (yellow card) 50'	Report	Leandro (yellow card) 39'; Németh 76'	Stadium: Illovszky Rudolf Stadion; Attendance: 600; Referee: Attila Juhos; Assistant referees: Ring, Tumó

25 May 2002 38	Sopron	1–3	Haladás	Sopron
17:00 CEST (UTC+2)	Perger (yellow card) 25'; M. Tóth 68', (yellow card) 88'	Report	P. Tóth (yellow card) 19'; Halmosi 21'; Preisinger 46'; Filipović 59', (yellow card) 75'; Leandro (yellow card) 82'	Stadium: Káposztás utcai Stadion; Attendance: 2,000; Referee: Attila Ábrahám; Assistant referees: Balajti, Georgiu

=== Magyar Kupa ===
18 September 2001 Second round	Gellénháza	1–8	Haladás	Gellénháza
15:30 CEST (UTC+2)	Z. Trencséni	Report	L. Nagy 3x, (yellow card); A. Varga 2x; P. Tóth; Halmosi; Japa	Stadium: Gellénházi Sportpálya; Attendance: 1,100; Referee: Sóthy; Assistant referees: Z. Rácz, Ráthgéber

10 October 2001 Round of 32	Haladás	3–1	Celldömölk	Szombathely
18:00 CEST (UTC+2)	Halmosi (yellow card); G. Nagy (yellow card); Filipović 52', 57'; Preisinger 85'	Report	Gajda (yellow card); Szőllősi (yellow card); T. Bodor 5'	Stadium: Rohonci út Attendance: 1,500; Referee: Ferenc Bede; Assistant referees: Ring, Koch

28 November 2001 Round of 16	Rákospalota	1–1 (a.e.t.) (2–4 p)	Haladás	Budapest
12:30 CET (UTC+1)	Virágh 36'; Yavruyan (yellow card) 83'	Report	Juhász 20', (yellow card) 71'; Suriel (yellow card) 116'	Stadium: Budai II. László Stadion; Attendance: 400; Referee: János Megyebíró; Assistant referees: Hrabovszky, Hegedűs
	Penalties
	Werle (penalty scored); Nyerges (penalty scored); Grytsayuk (penalty missed); M'bemba (penalty missed)		(penalty scored) Halmosi; (penalty scored) Leandro; (penalty scored) Czeglédi; (penalty scored) Somfalvi
Note: Haladás won 4–2 on penalties.

6 March 2002 Quarter-finals	Haladás	0–0 (a.e.t.) (3–2 p)	Győr	Szombathely
18:00 CET (UTC+1)	Janković (yellow card) 67'	Report	Stark (yellow card) 85'; Lakos (yellow card) 107'	Stadium: Rohonci út Attendance: 4,500; Referee: János Makai; Assistant referees: T. Gyarmati I, I. Mészáros
	Penalties
	Halmosi (penalty scored); Preisinger (penalty scored); Selymes (penalty missed); Janković (penalty scored)		(penalty missed) André; (penalty scored) Krejčí; (penalty scored) Gögh; (penalty missed) Stark; (penalty missed) Szanyó
Note: Haladás won 3–2 on penalties.

2 April 2002 Semi-finals	Dunaferr	2–3	Haladás	Dunaújváros
14:00 CEST (UTC+2)	Z. Molnár (yellow card) 1'; G. Kiss (yellow card) 34'; Lengyel 56', 78' (pen.); Sowunmi (yellow card) 61'	Report	Lukács (yellow card) 10'; Filipović 33', (yellow card) 67'; Szekér (yellow card) 61'; Preisinger 74'; Leandro 80' (pen.)	Stadium: Dunaújvárosi Stadion; Attendance: 700; Referee: Ferenc Bede; Assistant referees: G. Kiss, J. Erdős

1 May 2002 Final	Haladás	1–2 (a.e.t.)	Újpest	Győr
18:00 CEST (UTC+2)	Szekér (yellow card) 65'; Halmosi 74'; Filipović (yellow card) 85'; Japa (yellow card) 97'; Somfalvi (yellow card) 105'	Report	Vágner 26', 120'; Lőw (yellow card) 48'; Posza (yellow card) 61'; Poljaković (yellow card) 73'; Tamási (yellow card) 76'	Stadium: Stadion ETO; Attendance: 10,000; Referee: Attila Ábrahám; Assistant referees: Balajti, Georgiu
