= 2002 Magyar Kupa final =

- Event: 2001–02 Magyar Kupa
Haladás	Újpest
1	2
- After extra time
- Date: 1 May 2002
- Venue: Stadion ETO, Győr
- Referee: Attila Ábrahám
- Attendance: 10,000

The 2002 Magyar Kupa final decided the winners of the 2001–02 Magyar Kupa, the 62nd season of Hungarian premier football cup, the Magyar Kupa. The match was played on 1 May 2002 at the Stadion ETO in Győr between Haladás and Újpest.

Újpest defeated Haladás 2–1 after extra time, with Robert Vágner scoring the winning goal in the final minute of the match.

== Background ==
Team	Previous finals appearances (bold indicates winners)
Haladás	2 (1975, 1993)
Újpest	13 (1922, 1923, 1925, 1927, 1933, **1969**, **1970**, **1975**, **1982**, **1983**, **1987**, **1992**, 1998)

== Venue ==
On 4 April 2002, the Hungarian Football Federation decided that the final would be held in Győr on 1 May at 18:00 CEST, with Stadion ETO selected over Székesfehérvár's Sóstói Stadion, which had also been under consideration as a venue.

== Route to the final ==
Note: In all results below, the score of the finalist is given first (H: home; A: away).

Haladás		Round	Újpest	
Opponent	Result		Opponent	Result
Bye		First round	Bye	
Gellénháza	8–1 (A)	Second round	Kisújszállás	3–1 (A)
Celldömölk	3–1 (H)	Round of 32	Ferencváros	1–1 (a.e.t.) (4–1 p) (A)
Rákospalota	1–1 (a.e.t.) (4–2 p) (A)	Round of 16	BKV Előre	3–2 (H)
Győr	0–0 (a.e.t.) (3–2 p) (H)	Quarter-finals	Sopron	2–0 (H)
Dunaferr	3–2 (A)	Semi-finals	Tatabánya	2–2 (a.e.t.) (4–2 p) (A)

== Match ==
=== Summary ===
Újpest began the final brightly after an early chance for Haladás's Alex, taking control of the match and creating several opportunities. Robert Vágner was particularly active in attack, and he gave Újpest the lead in the 26th minute with a 25-metre shot that went past goalkeeper Tamás Takács. Haladás responded by improving its play after the goal, but struggled to create clear scoring opportunities before half-time. Early in the second half, Haladás made two substitutions as manager Lázár Szentes sought to strengthen his team. Újpest continued to threaten on the counter-attack, with Radek Slončík forcing a save from Takács in the 57th minute. Haladás gradually increased its pressure, although much of its possession produced few clear chances. In the 74th minute, Péter Halmosi equalised for Haladás with a left-footed shot from 18 metres following Leandro's pass. The equaliser was considered deserved as Haladás had increased its attacking pressure while Újpest had increasingly concentrated on defending. After the goal, however, and particularly during extra time, Haladás began to tire and Újpest pushed the Szombathely side back towards its own penalty area. Despite Újpest's territorial dominance in extra time, neither side initially produced a decisive scoring opportunity. Both teams had further chances late in the match, including opportunities for Tibor Tokody and Halmosi. In the final minute of extra time, Vágner scored again after Dejan Poljaković's cross, controlling the ball with his chest before shooting from close range to make it 2–1. The goal secured Újpest's victory and ensured their spot in the qualifying round of 2002–03 UEFA Cup. After the final whistle, Újpest supporters entered the pitch to celebrate with the players, while the referee ended the match with at least 500 supporters on the field.

=== Details ===
1 May 2002
18:00 CEST (UTC+2)

Haladás	1–2 (a.e.t.)	Újpest
Halmosi 74'	Report	Vágner 26', 120'

Stadion ETO, Győr
Attendance: 10,000
Referee: Attila Ábrahám

GK	(Hungary) Tamás Takács
DF	(Hungary) András Kaj
DF	(Brazil) Flávio Pim		(substituted off) 67'
DF	(Hungary) István Szekér	(yellow card) 65'
MF	(Hungary) Csaba Somfalvi	(yellow card) 105'
MF	(Hungary) László Némethy		(substituted off) 46'
MF	(Brazil) Leandro
MF	(Romania) Tibor Selymes
FW	(Brazil) Fred		(substituted off) 55'
FW	(Brazil) Alex
FW	(Hungary) Péter Halmosi
Substitutes:
DF	(Brazil) Japa	(yellow card) 97'	(substituted on) 67'
MF	(Hungary) Tamás Juhász		(substituted on) 46'
FW	(Bosnia and Herzegovina) Almir Filipović	(yellow card) 85'	(substituted on) 55'
Manager:
(Hungary) Lázár Szentes

GK	(Hungary) Zsolt Posza	(yellow card) 61'
DF	(Slovakia) František Kunzo
DF	(Hungary) Zoltán Tamási	(yellow card) 76'
DF	(Czech Republic) Luboš Kozel
DF	(Hungary) Zsolt Lőw	(yellow card) 48'
MF	(Hungary) Zoltán Szélesi
MF	(Hungary) Károly Erős
MF	(Czech Republic) Radek Slončík		(substituted off) 68'
MF	(Hungary) Gábor Korolovszky
FW	(Hungary) Tibor Tokody		(substituted off) 99'
FW	(Czech Republic) Robert Vágner
Substitutes:
MF	(Croatia) Dejan Poljaković	(yellow card) 73'	(substituted on) 68'
FW	(Hungary) Tamás Móri		(substituted on) 99'
Manager:
(Hungary) Róbert Glázer

Assistant referees:
János Balajti
Grigorisz Georgiou

**Match rules**

- 90 minutes
- 30 minutes of extra time if necessary
- Penalty shoot-out if scores still level

== See also ==
- 2001–02 Haladás VFC season
