= 2007–08 Budapest Honvéd FC season =

Honvéd
2007–08 season
- Manager: Attila Supka
- Stadium: Bozsik József Stadion
- Nemzeti Bajnokság I: 8th
- Magyar Kupa: Runners-up
- Ligakupa: Autumn season: Group stage Spring season: Group stage
- Szuperkupa: Runners-up
- UEFA Cup: Second qualifying round
Home colours	Away colours

The 2007–08 season was Budapest Honvéd Football Club's 97th competitive season, 3rd consecutive season in the Nemzeti Bajnokság I and 98th year in existence as a football club. In addition to the domestic league, Honvéd participated in that season's editions of the Magyar Kupa, the Ligakupa, the Szuperkupa and the UEFA Cup.

== Squad ==
Note: Flags indicate national team as defined under FIFA eligibility rules; some limited exceptions apply. Players may hold more than one non-FIFA nationality.

No.	Pos.	Nation	Player
1	GK	HUN	Iván Tóth
4	DF	GER	Yusuf Adewunmi
5	DF	CIV	Benjamin Angoua
6	MF	HUN	Tibor Pomper
7	MF	HUN	Gellért Ivancsics
8	GK	GER	Pascal Borel
9	MF	HUN	Attila Dobos
13	FW	HUN	Abass Cheikh Dieng
14	MF	HUN	Gábor Vincze
15	MF	HUN	Ákos Takács
18	FW	CIV	Abraham Gneki Guié
19	DF	BRA	Diego

No.	Pos.	Nation	Player
20	DF	SRB	Mićo Smiljanić
21	FW	HUN	Zoltán Hercegfalvi
22	MF	HUN	Zsolt Bárányos
23	DF	HUN	Zoltán Vincze
27	MF	HUN	Gábor Koós
28	MF	BIH	Esad Veledar
29	FW	HUN	Róbert Zsolnai
31	MF	HUN	Balázs Berdó
55	FW	HUN	Norbert Palásthy
79	MF	MOZ	Genito
—	DF	HUN	Tamás Filó

== Competitions ==
=== Overview ===
Competition	First match	Last match	Starting round	Final position	Record							
Competition	First match	Last match	Starting round	Final position	Pld	W	D	L	GF	GA	GD	Win %
Nemzeti Bajnokság I	22 July 2007	25 May 2008	Matchday 1	8th	30	12	7	11	45	36	+9	40.00
Magyar Kupa	26 September 2007	4 June 2008	Round of 32	Runners-up	9	6	1	2	22	16	+6	66.67
Ligakupa (Autumn season)	8 August 2007	10 October 2007	Group stage	Group stage	6	2	2	2	12	16	−4	33.33
Ligakupa (Spring season)	1 December 2007	27 February 2008	Group stage	Group stage	6	2	2	2	13	8	+5	33.33
Szuperkupa	11 July 2007	15 July 2007	Final	Runners-up	2	0	1	1	1	4	−3	0.00
UEFA Cup	19 July 2007	30 August 2007	First qualifying round	Second qualifying round	4	0	3	1	2	6	−4	0.00
Total					57	22	16	19	95	86	+9	38.60

Source: Competitions

=== Szuperkupa ===
Honvéd, as Magyar Kupa winners in the previous season, played against Debrecen in the 2008 Szuperkupa, who themselves won the Nemzeti Bajnokság I.

11 July 2007 First leg	Honvéd	1–1	Debrecen	Budapest
	Ivancsics 26'; Pomper (yellow card) 55'; Hercegfalvi (yellow card) 65'	Report	Vukmir (yellow card) 31'; Komlósi (yellow card) 60'; Kouemaha 67'; Bernáth (yellow card) 89'	Stadium: Bozsik József Stadion; Referee: Tamás Arany

15 July 2007 Second leg	Debrecen	3–0 (4–1 agg.)	Honvéd	Debrecen
	Dzsudzsák 7', 17'; Kiss 31', (yellow card) 50'	Report	Angoua (yellow card) 25'; Genito (yellow card) 57'; G. Vincze (yellow card) 64'	Stadium: Oláh Gábor utcai Stadion; Referee: Péter Solymosi
Note: Debrecen won 4–1 on aggregate.

=== Nemzeti Bajnokság I ===
==== League table ====
Pos	Team	Pld	W	D	L	GF	GA	GD	Pts	Qualification or relegation
6	Kaposvár	30	14	9	7	48	38	+10	51	
7	Zalaegerszeg	30	13	7	10	55	39	+16	46	
8	Honvéd	30	12	7	11	45	36	+9	43	Qualification for Intertoto Cup first round
9	Vasas	30	12	5	13	41	45	−4	41	
10	Nyíregyháza	30	11	7	12	34	37	−3	40	

Source: soccerway.com

==== Results summary ====
Overall								Home						Away					
Pld	W	D	L	GF	GA	GD	Pts	W	D	L	GF	GA	GD	W	D	L	GF	GA	GD
30	12	7	11	45	36	+9	43	6	4	5	24	18	+6	6	3	6	21	18	+3

Source: Hungarian Football Federation

==== Matches ====
22 July 2007 1	Rákospalota	0–3	Honvéd	Budapest
	Polonkai (yellow card) 41'; Dinka (yellow card) 57'	Report	Schindler (yellow card) 18'; Bárányos 39'; Guié 53'; Pomper 59'	Stadium: Budai II. László Stadion; Attendance: 2,300; Referee: Mihály Fábián

29 July 2007 2	Sopron	0–1	Honvéd	Sopron
		Report	Angoua 66'	Stadium: Káposztás utcai Stadion; Referee: Viktor Kassai

5 August 2007 3	Honvéd	5–1	Fehérvár	Budapest
	Dobos 14'; Palásthy 26'; Diego 34'; Bárányos 82'; Hercegfalvi 85'	Report	Božić 11'	Stadium: Bozsik József Stadion; Referee: Csaba Imre Sápi

11 August 2007 4	Paks	0–3	Honvéd	Paks
		Report	Hercegfalvi 14'; Guié 35', 48'	Stadium: Fehérvári úti Stadion; Referee: Zsolt Szabó

19 August 2007 5	Honvéd	1–4	Újpest	Budapest
	Bárányos 45'	Report	Korcsmár 41'; Sándor 54'; Kéthévoama 71'; Sadjo 80'	Stadium: Bozsik József Stadion; Referee: Mihály Fábián

24 August 2007 6	Diósgyőr	2–2	Honvéd	Miskolc
	Sipeki 18'; Simon 23'	Report	Hercegfalvi 15', 81'	Stadium: Diósgyőri Stadion; Referee: Zoltán Iványi

2 September 2007 7	Honvéd	3–1	Debrecen	Budapest
	Hercegfalvi 62'; B. Tóth 65'; Bárányos 71'	Report	Leandro 47'	Stadium: Bozsik József Stadion; Referee: Tamás Arany

15 September 2007 8	Siófok	1–2	Honvéd	Siófok
	S. Kanta 43'	Report	Palásthy 71'; Dieng 72'	Stadium: Révész Géza utcai Stadion; Referee: Péter Solymosi

21 September 2007 9	Honvéd	2–1	Zalaegerszeg	Budapest
	Guié 31'; Bárányos 47'; G. Vincze (yellow card) 80'	Report	Z. Tóth (yellow card) 17', (goal) 32'; Dudić (red card) 67'; B. Molnár (yellow card) 68'; Méyé (yellow card) 85'	Stadium: Bozsik József Stadion; Referee: Zoltán Iványi

1 October 2007 10	MTK	1–2	Honvéd	Budapest
	Bori 24'	Report	Guié 5'; Dieng 65'	Stadium: Hidegkuti Nándor Stadion; Referee: Ferenc Bede

6 October 2007 11	Honvéd	0–1	Kaposvár	Budapest
		Report	Oláh 86'	Stadium: Bozsik József Stadion; Referee: Roland Veizer

20 October 2007 12	Honvéd	2–2	Győr	Budapest
	Hercegfalvi 58'; Z. Vincze 89'	Report	Bajzát 38', 54'	Stadium: Bozsik József Stadion; Referee: József Berger

2 November 2007 13	Vasas	0–2	Honvéd	Budapest
		Report	Guié 50'; Hercegfalvi 71'	Stadium: Illovszky Rudolf Stadion; Referee: Zoltán Iványi

10 November 2007 14	Honvéd	0–0	Nyíregyháza	Budapest
		Report		Stadium: Bozsik József Stadion; Referee: Tamás Arany

24 November 2007 15	Tatabánya	4–3	Honvéd	Tatabánya
	Béres 4'; Weisz 67', 78'; Pastva 68'	Report	Bárányos 14'; Guié 36'; Hercegfalvi 52'	Stadium: Stadion Városi; Referee: Roland Veizer

23 February 2008 16	Honvéd	1–1	Rákospalota	Budapest
	Filó 29'; Smiljanić (yellow card) 57'	Report	Torma 60'; Horváth (yellow card) 65'	Stadium: Bozsik József Stadion; Attendance: 1,700; Referee: Tamás Bognár

1 March 2008 17	Honvéd	3–0 (Awarded)	Sopron	Budapest
		Report		Stadium: Bozsik József Stadion
Note: After the exclusion of Sopron, the matches were registered with a goal difference of 3–0.

7 March 2008 18	Fehérvár	0–0	Honvéd	Székesfehérvár
		Report		Stadium: Sóstói Stadion; Referee: Viktor Kassai

15 March 2008 19	Honvéd	2–1	Paks	Budapest
	Zsolnai 10'; Genito 78'	Report	Éger 22'	Stadium: Bozsik József Stadion; Referee: Sándor Andó-Szabó

21 March 2008 20	Újpest	1–0	Honvéd	Budapest
	Tisza 90+2'	Report		Stadium: Szusza Ferenc Stadion; Referee: Péter Solymosi

28 March 2008 21	Honvéd	0–1	Diósgyőr	Budapest
		Report	Honma 79'	Stadium: Bozsik József Stadion; Referee: Zsolt Szabó

5 April 2008 22	Debrecen	1–0	Honvéd	Debrecen
	Kerekes 10'	Report		Stadium: Oláh Gábor utcai Stadion; Referee: Tamás Arany

12 April 2008 23	Honvéd	1–1	Siófok	Budapest
	Dieng 81'	Report	Miklósvári 4'	Stadium: Bozsik József Stadion; Referee: Viktor Kassai

21 April 2008 24	Zalaegerszeg	2–1	Honvéd	Zalaegerszeg
	Méyé (yellow card) 16'; Miljatovič (yellow card) 18'; B. Molnár (yellow card) 36'; Botiș (yellow card) 60'; Waltner 72', 88'	Report	Angoua (yellow card) 3'; Dieng 36'; Koós (yellow card) 83'	Stadium: ZTE Arena; Referee: István Vad

27 April 2008 25	Honvéd	0–2	MTK	Budapest
		Report	Pátkai 44'; Szabó 90+3'	Stadium: Bozsik József Stadion; Referee: Ferenc Bede

5 May 2008 26	Kaposvár	1–0	Honvéd	Kaposvár
	Oláh 43'	Report		Stadium: Rákóczi Stadion; Referee: Zsolt Szabó

10 May 2008 27	Győr	2–2	Honvéd	Győr
	Bajzát 64'; Varga 73'	Report	Diego 25'; Dobos 62'	Stadium: ETO Park; Referee: Zoltán Iványi

19 May 2008 28	Honvéd	0–1	Vasas	Budapest
		Report	Pandur 25'	Stadium: Bozsik József Stadion; Referee: István Vad

25 May 2008 29	Nyíregyháza	3–0	Honvéd	Nyíregyháza
	Filó 31' (o.g.); Lippai 51'; Ramos 79'	Report		Stadium: Városi Stadion; Referee: Gergely Sulyok

1 June 2008 30	Honvéd	4–1	Tatabánya	Budapest
	Guié 28', 77'; Bárányos 73', 90+1'	Report	Kovács 59'	Stadium: Bozsik József Stadion; Referee: Krisztián Király

=== Magyar Kupa ===
26 September 2007 Round of 32	SZEOL	1–4	Honvéd	Szeged
	K. Bubori 88'	Report	Magasföldi 38'; Guié 60', 68'; M. Tóth 78'	Stadium: Felső Tisza-parti stadion Referee: Gergely Sulyok

==== Round of 16 ====
24 October 2007 First leg	Honvéd	2–1	Sopron	Budapest
	Bárányos 6'; Dieng 17'	Report	Aquino 83'	Stadium: Bozsik József Stadion; Referee: Krisztián Király

7 November 2007 Second leg	Sopron	0–3 (1–5 agg.)	Honvéd	Sopron
		Report	Guié 11'; Smiljanić 21'; Hercegfalvi 55'	Stadium: Káposztás utcai Stadion; Referee: Ferenc Bede
Note: Honvéd won 5–1 on aggregate.

==== Quarter-finals ====
18 March 2008 First leg	Kazincbarcika	2–2	Honvéd	Kazincbarcika
15:00 CET (UTC+1)	Stevica 9'; Binder 15'	Report	Zsolnai 28'; Dobos 52'	Stadium: Pete András Stadion; Referee: Csaba Imre Sápi

25 March 2008 Second leg	Honvéd	4–2 (6–4 agg.)	Kazincbarcika	Budapest
19:00 CET (UTC+1)	Dieng 15'; Hercegfalvi 73', 90'; Diego 77'	Report	P. Kovács 7'; Stevica 39'	Stadium: Bozsik József Stadion; Referee: Ádám Németh
Note: Honvéd won 6–4 on aggregate.

==== Semi-finals ====
1 April 2008 First leg	Honvéd	4–0	Kaposvár	Budapest
	Dobos 19'; Hercegfalvi 54', 89'; Bárányos 67'	Report		Stadium: Bozsik József Stadion; Referee: Zoltán Iványi

9 April 2008 Second leg	Kaposvár	1–2 (1–6 agg.)	Honvéd	Kaposvár
	Pomper 83' (o.g.)	Report	Smiljanić 35'; Genito 44'	Stadium: Rákóczi Stadion; Referee: Szabolcs Szilasi
Note: Honvéd won 6–1 on aggregate.

==== Final ====
28 May 2008 Second leg	Honvéd	0–7	Debrecen	Budapest
	Filó (yellow card) 11'; Adewunmi (red card) 57'; Pomper (yellow card) 68'; Dobos (red card) 73'	Report	Leandro 9'; Rudolf 18', (yellow card) 29'; Czvitkovics 30', 83'; Kouemaha 57', 78', 89'; Z. Takács (yellow card) 69'	Stadium: Bozsik József Stadion; Referee: Viktor Kassai

4 June 2008 First leg	Debrecen	2–1 (9–1 agg.)	Honvéd	Debrecen
	Bernáth (yellow card) 54'; Czvitkovics (yellow card) 58', (goal) 74'; Leandro 77'; Kerekes (yellow card) 85'	Report	Pomper (yellow card) 30'; Filó 39'; Bárányos (yellow card) 68'	Stadium: Oláh Gábor utcai Stadion; Referee: István Vad
Note: Debrecen won 9–1 on aggregate.

=== Ligakupa ===
==== Autumn season ====
===== Group stage =====
Pos	Team	Pld	W	D	L	GF	GA	GD	Pts	Qualification	FEH	UJP	HON	PAK
1	Fehérvár	6	3	1	2	15	9	+6	10	Advance to knockout phase	—	3–0	2–2	3–1
2	Újpest	6	3	1	2	15	14	+1	10	Advance to knockout phase	4–3	—	4–5	4–1
3	Honvéd	6	2	2	2	12	16	−4	8		0–3	1–1	—	4–2
4	Paks	6	2	0	4	11	14	−3	6		2–1	1–2	4–0	—

Source: HFF

8 August 2007 1	Honvéd	4–2	Paks	Budapest
19:30 CEST (UTC+2)	Debreceni 24'; Palásthy 29'; Magasföldi 71'; Bárányos 79'	Report	Báló 27'; Brukner 73'	Stadium: Bozsik József Stadion; Attendance: 700; Referee: Szabolcs Szilasi

22 August 2007 2	Újpest	4–5	Honvéd	Budapest
16:00 CEST (UTC+2)	Tisza 3'; Rajczi 12'; Széki 61'; Roiha 86'	Report	B. Tóth 41'; Dieng 47', 54'; Debreceni 88'; M. Tóth 90+2'	Stadium: Szusza Ferenc Stadion; Referee: Ádám Németh

9 September 2007 3	Fehérvár	2–2	Honvéd	Székesfehérvár
19:00 CEST (UTC+2)	Simek 15'; Sitku 89'	Report	Dieng 42'; Bárányos 61'	Stadium: Sóstói Stadion; Referee: Zsolt Szabó

18 September 2007 4	Honvéd	0–3	Fehérvár	Budapest
18:00 CEST (UTC+2)		Report	Dajić 49'; Kocsis 67'; Farkas 89'	Stadium: Bozsik József Stadion; Referee: József Berger

3 October 2007 5	Paks	4–0	Honvéd	Paks
15:00 CEST (UTC+2)	Márkus 9', 20', 56'; Báló 41'	Report		Stadium: Fehérvári úti Stadion; Attendance: 300; Referee: Norbert Kiss

10 October 2007 6	Honvéd	1–1	Újpest	Budapest
18:00 CEST (UTC+2)	Smiljanić 58'	Report	Dourandi 89'	Stadium: Bozsik József Stadion; Attendance: 1,000; Referee: Csaba Imre Sápi

==== Spring season ====
===== Group stage =====
Pos	Team	Pld	W	D	L	GF	GA	GD	Pts	Qualification	DEB	RAK	HON	NYI
1	Debrecen	6	4	1	1	10	8	+2	13	Advance to knockout phase	—	3–2	2–1	2–1
2	Rákospalota	6	3	1	2	9	10	−1	9 (Note: Rákospalota were deducted 1 point.)	Advance to knockout phase	3–1	—	1–1	2–0
3	Honvéd	6	2	2	2	13	8	+5	8		1–2	5–0	—	4–2
4	Nyíregyháza	6	0	2	4	4	10	−6	2		0–0	0–1	1–1	—

Source: HFF
Notes:

1 December 2007 1	Honvéd	4–2	Nyíregyháza	Budapest
13:00 CET (UTC+1)	Guié 3'; Hercegfalvi 5', 38'; Zsolnai 84'	Report	Montvai 65'; Apostu 74'	Stadium: Bozsik József Stadion; Referee: Róbert Nagy

5 December 2007 2	Rákospalota	1–1	Honvéd	Budapest
13:00 CET (UTC+1)	Erős (yellow card) 42'; Varga (yellow card) 68'; Kapcsos 72'	Report	Hercegfalvi 65'	Stadium: Budai II. László Stadion; Attendance: 400; Referee: István Vad

8 December 2007 3	Debrecen	2–1	Honvéd	Debrecen
13:00 CET (UTC+1)	Z. Takács 41' (pen.), 80'	Report	Veledar 37'	Stadium: Oláh Gábor utcai Stadion; Referee: Péter Solymosi

16 February 2008 4	Honvéd	1–2	Debrecen	Budapest
13:00 CET (UTC+1)	Ivancsics 4'	Report	Dombi 20'; Kouemaha 45'	Stadium: Bozsik József Stadion; Referee: Zsolt Szabó

20 February 2008 5	Nyíregyháza	1–1	Honvéd	Nyíregyháza
14:00 CET (UTC+1)	Granát 42'	Report	Fritz 80'	Stadium: Városi Stadion; Referee: Sándor Andó-Szabó

27 February 2008 6	Honvéd	5–0	Rákospalota	Budapest
18:00 CET (UTC+1)	Veledar 26' (pen.), 48' (pen.); Koós 83', 85', 90+1'	Report	Kiss (yellow card) 23'; Horváth (yellow card) 48'; Dinka (yellow card) 89'	Stadium: Bozsik József Stadion; Attendance: 1,200; Referee: Tibor Gyarmati II

=== UEFA Cup ===
==== Qualifying rounds ====
===== First qualifying round =====
19 July 2007 First leg	Nistru Otaci (Moldova)	1–1	(Hungary) Honvéd	Chişinău, Moldova
18:00 CEST (UTC+2)	Malitskyy 29'; Habib (yellow card) 32'; Țaranu (yellow card) 72'	Report	B. Tóth (yellow card) 17'; Guié 51'; Pomper (yellow card) 75'	Stadium: Zimbru Stadium; Attendance: 1,500; Referee: Bülent Demirlek (Turkey)

2 August 2007 Second leg	Honvéd (Hungary)	1–1 (2–2 agg.) (5–4 p)	(Moldova) Nistru Otaci	Budapest, Hungary
20:30 CEST (UTC+2)	Guié 14'; Genito (yellow card) 59'	Report	Lupașcu (yellow card) 37' (yellow-red card) 111'; Habib (yellow card) 50'; Mukhovykov (yellow card) 94'	Stadium: Bozsik József Stadion; Attendance: 3,023; Referee: Michael Svendsen (Denmark)
	Penalties
	Bárányos (penalty scored); Genito (penalty missed); Ivancsics (penalty scored); Diego (penalty missed); Pomper (penalty missed); Angoua (penalty scored); Smiljanic (penalty missed); Koós (penalty scored); Schindler (penalty scored)		(penalty missed) Mațiura; (penalty scored) Dolgov; (penalty missed) Mukhovykov; (penalty scored) Butelschi; (penalty missed) Savchuk; (penalty scored) Habib; (penalty missed) Țaranu; (penalty scored) Sangare; (penalty missed) Hroshev
Note: 2–2 on aggregate. Honvéd won 5–4 on penalties.

===== Second qualifying round =====
16 August 2007 First leg	Honvéd (Hungary)	0–0	(Germany) Hamburg	Budapest, Hungary
19:00 CEST (UTC+2)	Genito (yellow card) 37'; Hercegfalvi (yellow card) 40'; Magasföldi (yellow card) 48'; Z. Vincze (yellow card) 76'	Report	De Jong (yellow card) 31'; Jarolím (yellow card) 62'; Trochowski (yellow card) 89'	Stadium: Szusza Ferenc Stadion; Attendance: 7,000; Referee: Björn Kuipers (Netherlands)

30 August 2007 Second leg	Hamburg (Germany)	4–0 (4–0 agg.)	(Hungary) Honvéd	Hamburg, Germany
20:30 CEST (UTC+2)	Guerrero 9', 38'; Smiljanić 50' (o.g.); Choupo-Moting 90'	Report	G. Vincze (yellow card) 27'; Z. Vincze (yellow card) 47'	Stadium: HSH Nordbank Arena; Attendance: 42,090; Referee: Julián Rodríguez Santiago (Spain)
Note: Hamburg won 4–0 on aggregate.
