= Crișana (disambiguation) =

Crişana may also refer to:

- Crișana (newspaper), local newspaper based in Oradea
- Crișana, historical region of Romania and Hungary
- Crișana Oradea, football club based in Oradea, Romania
- Stadionul Crișana, a multi-use stadium in Sebiș, Romania
- Crișana dialect, one of the dialects of the Romanian language

== See also ==
- Criș (disambiguation)
- Crișan (disambiguation)
- Crișeni (disambiguation)
- Crișuri (disambiguation)
