= Béla Takács =

Hungarian footballer (born 1974)

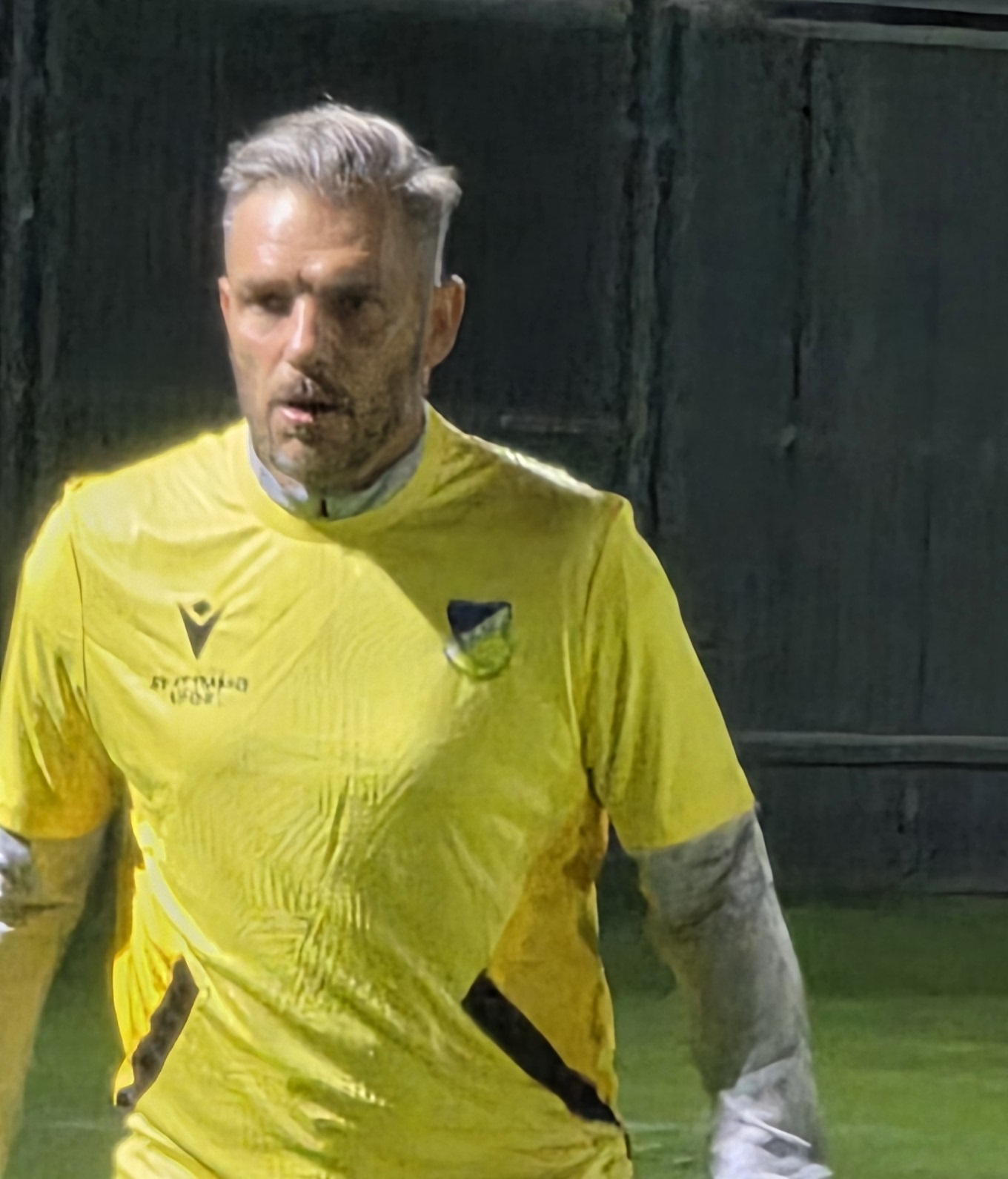
- Takács playing for Rákospalota Old Boys in 2026

Personal information
- Full name: Béla Zoltán Takács
- Date of birth: 24 February 1974 (age 52)
- Place of birth: Budapest, Hungary
- Height: 1.85 m (6 ft 1 in)
- Position: Right-back

Youth career
- Vasas
- Rákospalota

Senior career*
Years	Team	Apps	(Gls)
1994–1999	Rákospalota	119	(3)
1999	Hatvan	9	(0)
1999–2002	Haladás	48	(0)
2002–2003	Celldömölk	39	(1)
2003–2006	Halásztelek		
2006–2008	Bag	3	(0)
2008–2014	Mátyásföld	83	(6)
2012	Mátyásföld II	3	(0)
2017–2018	Csillaghegy	9	(0)
Total		313	(10)
- * Club domestic league appearances and goals

Béla Zoltán Takács (born 24 February 1974) is a Hungarian former professional footballer who played as a right-back.

== Career ==
Takács scored his first senior goal on 20 November 1994, opening the scoring for Rákospalota in a 1–1 draw in the Nemzeti Bajnokság III against table leaders Eger.

On 23 July 1999, right-back Takács transferred from Nemzeti Bajnokság III club Hatvan to Nemzeti Bajnokság I side Haladás.

== Career statistics ==
Appearances and goals by club, season and competition
Club	Season	League			Magyar Kupa		Other		Total	
Club	Season	Division	Apps	Goals	Apps	Goals	Apps	Goals	Apps	Goals
Rákospalota	1993–94	Nemzeti Bajnokság II	5	0	—		—		5	0
Rákospalota	1994–95	Nemzeti Bajnokság III	25	2	—		—		25	2
Rákospalota	1995–96	Nemzeti Bajnokság III	26	1	—		—		26	1
Rákospalota	1996–97	Nemzeti Bajnokság III	26	0	3	0	—		29	0
Rákospalota	1997–98	Nemzeti Bajnokság III	24	0	—		—		24	0
Rákospalota	1998–99	Nemzeti Bajnokság III	13	0	—		—		13	0
Rákospalota	Total		119	3	3	0	—		122	3
Hatvan	1998–99	Nemzeti Bajnokság III	9	0	—		—		9	0
Haladás	1999–2000	Nemzeti Bajnokság I	16	0	3	0	—		19	0
Haladás	2000–01	Nemzeti Bajnokság I	7	0	2	0	—		25	0
Haladás	2000–01	Nemzeti Bajnokság II	16	0	2	0	—		25	0
Haladás	2001–02	Nemzeti Bajnokság I	9	0	2	0	—		11	0
Haladás	Total		48	0	7	0	—		55	0
Celldömölk	2001–02	Nemzeti Bajnokság II	6	0	—		—		6	0
Celldömölk	2002–03	Nemzeti Bajnokság II	33	1	1	0	—		34	1
Celldömölk	Total		39	1	1	0	—		40	1
Bag	2007–08	Megyei Bajnokság I	3	0	—		—		3	0
Mátyásföld	2008–09	Megyei Bajnokság I	10	2	—		—		10	2
Mátyásföld	2009–10	Megyei Bajnokság I	22	3	—		—		22	3
Mátyásföld	2010–11	Megyei Bajnokság I	5	0	—		—		5	0
Mátyásföld	2011–12	Megyei Bajnokság I	17	0	—		—		17	0
Mátyásföld	2012–13	Megyei Bajnokság I	13	1	—		—		13	1
Mátyásföld	2013–14	Megyei Bajnokság II	16	0	—		0	0	16	0
Mátyásföld	Total		83	6	—		0	0	83	6
Mátyásföld II	2011–12	Megyei Bajnokság IV	3	0	—		—		3	0
Csillaghegy	2017–18	Megyei Bajnokság III	9	0	—		2 (Note: Appearances in Budapest Kupa)	0	11	0
Career total			313	10	11	0	2	0	326	10

== Honours ==
Haladás

- Nemzeti Bajnokság II – West: 2000–01
- Magyar Kupa runner-up: 2001–02
