= Crișul Mic =

Crișul Mic may refer to the following rivers:

- Crișul Mic (Crișul Negru), a tributary of the Crișul Negru in Romania
- Crișul Mic (Barcău), a tributary of the Barcău in Romania and Hungary

== See also ==
- Criș (disambiguation)
- Crișan (disambiguation)
