= Dan Găldean =

Romanian footballer

Personal information
- Full name: Constantin Dan Găldean
- Date of birth: 18 May 1974 (age 52)
- Place of birth: Sebeș, Romania
- Height: 1.68 m (5 ft 6 in)
- Position: Midfielder

Senior career*
Years	Team	Apps	(Gls)
1995–1997	Minaur Zlatna	58	(9)
1997–2001	Gaz Metan Mediaș	73	(11)
1998	→ Minaur Zlatna (loan)	?	(?)
2001	Dnipro Dnipropetrovsk	8	(1)
2001	→ Dnipro-2 Dnipropetrovsk	1	(0)
2001	→ Dnipro-3 Dnipropetrovsk	1	(0)
2002	Kryvbas Kryvyi Rih	4	(0)
2002–2005	Apulum Alba Iulia	82	(20)
2005	Politehnica Timișoara	5	(0)
2006	Universitatea Cluj	10	(2)
2006–2007	Jiul Petroșani	13	(0)
2007–2008	Unirea Alba Iulia	30	(3)
2009	ACU Arad	?	(?)
2010	Național Sebiș	?	(?)

Managerial career
- 2013: Național Sebiș
- * Club domestic league appearances and goals as of 5 December 2017

Constantin Dan Găldean (born 18 May 1974) is a Romanian former football player who played on the right wing. Găldean had a brief spell in the Ukrainian Premier League with Dnipro and Kryvbas Kryvyi Rih. He is also the all-time goalscorer for Unirea Alba Iulia in the Liga I.
