= Crișeni (disambiguation) =

Crişeni may refer to several places:

- Crișeni, a commune in Sălaj County
- Crişeni, a village in Vințu de Jos Commune, Alba County
- Crişeni, a village in Mociu Commune, Cluj County
- Crişeni, a village in Atid Commune, Harghita County
- Crişeni, a village in Craidorolț Commune, Satu Mare County

== See also ==
- Criș (disambiguation)
- Crișana (disambiguation)
