= Crișuri =

There are three Rivers in Romania that have part of their name Criş:

- Crişul Alb
- Crişul Negru
- Crişul Repede

The first two form the River Criş in Hungary.

== Other ==
- Ținutul Crișuri

== See also ==
- Criș (disambiguation)
- Crișana (disambiguation)
