= Criș =

Criș may refer to several places:

== Localities in Romania ==
- Criș, a village in Blăjeni Commune, Hunedoara County
- Criș, a village in Daneș Commune, Mureș County

== Rivers in Romania ==
- Körös, (Romanian: Criș), in western Romania and southeast Hungary

Its tributaries
- Crișul Alb, in western Romania
- Crișul Negru, in western Romania
- Crișul Repede, in western Romania

- Criș (Târnava Mare), Mureș County

== See also ==
- Chișineu-Criș, town in Arad County
- Crișan (disambiguation)
- Crișana (disambiguation)
- Crișeni (disambiguation)
- Crișuri (disambiguation)
- Crișul Mic River (disambiguation)
