= Crișan =

Crișan may refer to several places in Romania:

- Crișan, Tulcea, a commune in Tulcea County
- Crișan, Satu Mare, a residential district in Satu Mare municipality
- Crișan, a village in Crucea Commune, Constanța County
- Crișan, a village in Ribița Commune, Hunedoara County
- Crișan, a tributary of the Chichirgeaua in Constanța County
- Hilișeu-Crișan, a village in Hilișeu-Horia Commune, Botoșani County

== And to ==
- Crișan, a leader of the Revolt of Horea, Cloșca and Crișan

== Other ==
- Crișan (surname)

== See also ==
- Criș (disambiguation)
- Crișana (disambiguation)
