= Jozef Majoroš =

Slovak footballer

Personal information
- Date of birth: 19 March 1970 (age 56)
- Place of birth: Geča, Czechoslovakia
- Height: 1.76 m (5 ft 9 in)
- Position: Forward

Youth career
- TJ Geča
- 1983–1985: ZŤS Košice

Senior career*
Years	Team	Apps	(Gls)
1985–1990	ZŤS Košice		
1990–1992	Dukla Banská Bystrica	43	(9)
1992–1994	Plastika Nitra	56	(5)
1994–1996	Viktoria Žižkov	77	(8)
1996–1998	Petra Drnovice	55	(15)
1998–2000	ŠK Slovan Bratislava	38	(9)
2000	Aris FC	2	(0)
2000–2001	Artmedia Petržalka	24	(3)
2001–2002	Debreceni VSC	29	(2)
2002–2003	MATÁV Sopron	26	(0)
2003–2004	SC-ESV Parndorf		
2003–2004	Družstevník Báč	8	(2)

International career
- Czechoslovakia U-20
1997–1999	Slovakia	23	(5)

Managerial career
- 2006–2015: Slovan Bratislava juniori
- 2015: TJ Iskra Borčice
- 2016: MFK Skalica (Assistant)
- 2016–2017: Liptovský Mikuláš
- * Club domestic league appearances and goals

Jozef Majoroš (pronounced Mayorosh) (born 19 March 1970 in Geča near Košice) is a former Slovak footballer and head coach of Liptovský Mikuláš.

== Club career ==
Majoroš started with football in his native village Geča. Functionaries of ZŤS Košice noticed his football talent and moved Jozef to their club when he was thirteen. He played in all youth squads at ZŤS Košice. In 1988, Jozef progressed to the senior team. After he finished this stage in Košice, he continued his career in Dukla Banská Bystrica, and then in Czech teams Viktoria Žižkov and Petra Drnovice. Jozef was declared Slovak Footballer of the Year in 1998, and was nominated as one of the best 11 players of the Czech Football League. He ended his career in 2004 after a stage in second division team Družstevník Báč. He now coaches young players.

== International career ==
Majoroš played for Czechoslovakia in the 1989 FIFA World Youth Championship. He was capped 23 times for Slovakia and scored 5 goals. The most memorable goal he scored against Czech Republic at the UEFA Euro 1996 qualifying on 11 October 1995 in Bratislava. It was the winning moment in this match and Slovakia won 2–1.

== Honours ==
=== Player ===
Slovan Bratislava

- Slovak Super Liga (1): 1998-99

Petra Drnovice

- Czech Cup Runners-Up (1): 1998

Individual

- Slovak Footballer of the Year (1): 1998
- Slovak Top eleven (1): 1998
- Czech Top eleven (1): 1997
