= CS Național Sebiș =

Romanian football club

Național Sebiș
- Full name: Clubul Sportiv Național Sebiș
- Nicknames: Alb-albaştrii (The White and Blues); Sebișenii (The People from Sebiș)
- Short name: Național
- Founded: 1922; 104 years ago as Sebișana Sebiș; 2004; 22 years ago as Național Sebiș
- Ground: Crișana
- Capacity: 1,500
- Owner: Town of Sebiș
- Chairman: Radu Borlea
- Head coach: Flavius Raț
- League: Liga IV
- 2025–26: Liga IV, Arad County, 10th of 13
- Website: https://csnationalsebis.ro/
Home colours	Away colours

Clubul Sportiv Național Sebiș, commonly known as Național Sebiș, is a Romanian football based in Sebiș, Arad County, currently playing in Liga IV Arad, one of the county leagues that make up the fourth tier of the Romanian football league system.

Founded in 1922 as Sebișana Sebiș, later known as Avântul (from 1950) and Crișana (from 1953), and re-founded in 2004, Național spent twelve consecutive seasons in Liga III after its promotion in 2008, before withdrawing during the winter break of the 2019–20 season due to financial problems. After a two-year hiatus, the club joined Liga VI Arad County, the sixth tier, and earned two consecutive promotions.

== History ==
The origins of football in Sebiș date back to the early 1920s, when engineer G. Fakelmann, who also served as a player and coach for several years, introduced the game to the town, bringing the first football and equipment and organizing a group of local youngsters. The first team, named Sebișana, was officially established on 15 March 1922 and included players such as Al. Moțocan, Nicolae Volan, Sever Scrofan, Laloș Ronay, Ștefan Moț, Iosif Bălan, Ion Ardelean, Ioan Piki, Pavel Pugna, Mihai Schelep, and G. Fakelmann. Some sources suggest that football activity existed as early as 1920, when a local side reportedly defeated Gloria Arad 4–0. In 1923, Sebișana played its first recorded matches, including a 2–1 victory against Zărand Brad, as football quickly gained popularity in the area.

Over the following decades, the team, known as Avântul from 1950 and later as Crișana from 1953, continued to perform well in regional competitions, competing in the Arad County Championship from the 1968–69 season, where it placed 6th, and maintaining the same position in 1969–70. Crișana improved to 3rd place in 1970–71, ended as runners-up in 1971–72, and secured promotion to Divizia C by winning the county title in 1972–73. The squad, coached by Daniel Bătrin, included Emil Avasilică, G. Verșigan, Ion Horga, Iosif Haija, Mihal Deliman, Ion Iercan, Nicolae Nica, Pascu Belea, Ion Pop, Pavel Pop, Ioan Coșeri, Tiberiu Sălejan, Ioan Băruța, Moise Jucan, Teodor Lupșa, and Ioan Roszeter.

In Divizia C, Crișana Sebiș finished 11th in Series IX of the 1973–74 season, but the following campaign proved disastrous, as the team finished last in Series VIII, thirteen points behind the 15th place, and was relegated to the Arad County Championship.

Former logo

In the 2007–08 season, Național achieved promotion to Liga III after winning Liga IV Arad County and the promotion play-off, defeating Arieșul Câmpeni, the Alba County winners, 1–0, and went on to spend twelve consecutive seasons in Liga III before withdrawing due to financial problems during the winter break of the 2019–20 season.

Național Sebiș returned after a two-year hiatus, joining Liga VI Arad, the sixth tier of the Romanian football league system. The team was built around several experienced players, together with young talents from the Sebiș area, and under the guidance of former players Flavius Raț and Leontin Sârb, they won the championship at the end of the 2021–22 season, earning promotion to the fifth tier.

With Flavius Raț as head coach in 2022–23, Național achieved back-to-back promotions, winning the Series C of the fifth-tier championship and advancing to Liga IV Arad.

At that time, the club had five youth groups, coordinated by former footballer Dorel Balint, who also took over as head coach of the first team during the winter break of the 2023–24 season, leading Național Sebiș to a 14th-place finish and 8th in the 2024–25 season. Balint stepped down in October 2025, leaving the team under Ovidiu Vezan and Cosmin Merșca, before Flavius Raț returned as head coach during the winter break, while Leontin Sârb took over the coordination of the youth sector, also serving as sporting director.

== Honours ==
Liga III

- Runners-up (1): 2013–14

Liga IV – Arad County

- Winners (2): 1972–73, 2007–08
- Runners-up (1): 1971–72

Liga V – Arad County

- Winners (1): 2022–23

Liga VI – Arad County

- Winners (1): 2021–22

== League and cup history ==
Season	Tier	Division	Place	Notes	Cupa României
2024–25	4	Liga IV (AR)	8th		
2023–24	4	Liga IV (AR)	14th		
2022–23	5	Liga V (AR) (Seria C)	1st (C)	Promoted	
2021–22	6	Liga VI (AR) (Seria B)	1st (C)	Promoted	
2020–21	Not active				
2019–20	3	Liga III (Seria IV)	15th	Withdrew	
2018–19	3	Liga III (Seria IV)	6th		
2017–18	3	Liga III (Seria IV)	3rd		
2016–17	3	Liga III (Seria IV)	4th		
2015–16	3	Liga III (Seria IV)	4th		
2014–15	3	Liga III (Seria IV)	4th		
2013–14	3	Liga III (Seria V)	2nd		
2012–13	3	Liga III (Seria V)	8th		
2011–12	3	Liga III (Seria V)	9th		
2010–11	3	Liga III (Seria V)	7th		
2009–10	3	Liga III (Seria V)	5th		
2008–09	3	Liga III (Seria V)	8th		
2007–08	4	Liga IV (AR)	1st (C)	Promoted	
2006–07	4	Liga IV (AR)	5th		
2005–06	4	Divizia D (AR)	11th		

== Former managers ==
- (Romania) Petre Grosu (2012)
- (Romania) Roland Nagy (2012–2013)
- (Romania) Dan Găldean (2013)
- (Romania) Adrian Neaga (2015–2016)
- (Romania) Alin Chița (2017)
- (Romania) Cristian Todea (2019)
- (Romania) Dănuț Șomcherechi (2019)
- (Romania) Flavius Raț (2020–2023)
- (Romania) Dorel Balint (2023–2025)
