= Crișan (surname) =

Crișan is a Romanian surname. Notable people with the surname include:

- Adrian Crișan (born 1980), Romanian table tennis player
- Alexandru Crișan (born 1962), Romanian chess player
- Ion Horațiu Crișan (1928–1994), Romanian historian and archaeologist
- Traian Crișan (1918–1990), Romanian Roman Catholic prelate
- Zoltan Crișan (1955–2003), Romanian footballer

== See also ==
- Crișan (disambiguation)
- Crișan River (disambiguation)
