= Crișan, Satu Mare =

Crişan (also known as Micro 15) is a residential district of Satu Mare in Romania. It is named after the Romanian revolutionary Crişan also known as Marcu Giurgiu.
