= Zsolt Vadicska =

Hungarian footballer

Personal information
- Full name: Zsolt Vadicska
- Date of birth: 16 April 1969 (age 57)
- Place of birth: Kunhegyes, Hungary
- Height: 1.88 m (6 ft 2 in)
- Position: Midfielder

Youth career
- 1983–1988: Szolnoki MÁV FC
- 1988–1992: Egri FC
- 1992–1994: Diósgyőri VTK

Senior career*
Years	Team	Apps	(Gls)
1994–2002	Debreceni VSC	171	(12)
2005–2006	Karcag	20	(7)
- * Club domestic league appearances and goals

Zsolt Vadicska (born 16 April 1969 in Kunhegyes) is a Hungarian former football player.

== Honours ==
- Debreceni VSC
  - Hungarian Cup: 1999, 2001
