= Yusuf Adewunmi =

German footballer (born 1982)

Yusuf-Muri Adewunmi
Personal information
- Full name: Yusuf Muritala Adewunmi
- Date of birth: 5 November 1982 (age 43)
- Place of birth: Hamburg, West Germany
- Height: 1.78 m (5 ft 10 in)
- Position: Defensive midfielder

Youth career
- 1990–1995: Vorwärts/Wacker Billstedt
- 1995–2000: FC St. Pauli
- 2000–2002: TuS Holstein Quickborn

Senior career*
Years	Team	Apps	(Gls)
2002–2003	Eimsbütteler TV	20	(6)
2003–2006	Hamburger SV II	66	(8)
2006–2007	Fortuna Düsseldorf	19	(1)
2007	Petržalka	2	(0)
2008	Honvéd Budapest	8	(0)
2008	Bremer SV	9	(1)
2008–2013	FC Oberneuland	54	(2)
2013–2015	TuS Dassendorf	7	(0)
- * Club domestic league appearances and goals

Yusuf Muritala Adewunmi (born 5 November 1982) is a German former professional footballer who played as defensive midfielder.

== Career ==
Adewunmi was born in Hamburg.

He made eight appearances in the Nemzeti Bajnokság I for the Honved Budapest.

== Personal life ==
Yusuf is the brother of Akeem Adewunmi, a player agent and a former footballer.
