= Esad Veledar =

German-born Bosnian footballer

Personal information
- Full name: Esad Becir Veledar
- Date of birth: 4 January 1984 (age 42)
- Place of birth: Munich, West Germany
- Height: 1.81 m (5 ft 11 in)
- Position: Midfielder

Youth career
- SpVgg Unterhaching
- 1998–2004: 1860 Munich

Senior career*
Years	Team	Apps	(Gls)
2004–2005	1860 Munich	5	(0)
2005–2006	Panionios	00	(0)
2006–2007	AC Martina	11	(0)
2007	FC Fehérvár	25	(0)
2008	Budapest Honvéd	5	(1)
2008–2009	FK Dunajská Streda	2	(0)
- * Club domestic league appearances and goals

Esad Veledar (born 4 January 1984) is a former professional footballer who played as a midfielder.
