= Srđan Golović =

Montenegrin footballer and manager

Personal information
- Full name: Srđan Golović
- Date of birth: 22 March 1967 (age 59)
- Place of birth: Titograd, SFR Yugoslavia
- Height: 1.81 m (5 ft 11 1/2 in)
- Position: Midfielder

Team information
- Current team: Partizan (Youth assistant coach)

Youth career
- –1986: OFK Titograd

Senior career*
Years	Team	Apps	(Gls)
1986–1989	OFK Titograd		
1989–1991	Budućnost Titograd	16	(0)
1991–1994	Rudar Pljevlja		
1994–1996	Obilić		
1996–1998	Čukarički	56	(5)
1999–2000	Radnički Niš		(1)
2001	MTK Budapest	15	(3)
2001–2002	Győri ETO	29	(0)

Managerial career
- 2002–2005: Čukarički (youth)
- 2005–2009: Čukarički (assistant)
- 2008: Čukarički
- 2008–2013: Čukarički (youth)
- 2016: Sinđelić Beograd (youth)
- 2018–: Partizan (youth)
- * Club domestic league appearances and goals

Srđan Golović (Serbian Cyrillic: Срђан Головић; born 22 March 1967) is a Montenegro football manager and former player.

== Playing career ==
=== Club ===
Born in Podgorica, known as Titograd back then and capital of SR Montenegro, SFR Yugoslavia, he started his career at OFK Titograd where, after playing in the youth teams, he debuted as senior and played there till 1989 when he joined FK Budućnost Titograd and played with them between 1989 and 1991 in the Yugoslav First League. He then played with FK Rudar Pljevlja, FK Obilić, FK Čukarički and FK Radnički Niš before moving to Hungary where he played with MTK Budapest FC and Győri ETO FC in the Nemzeti Bajnokság I between 2000 and 2002.

== Managerial career ==
After retiring, he stayed at Čukarički, coaching youth levels in the club. He holds UEFA A coaching licence, and between 2005 and 2009 he has worked with the first team of Čukarički. By Autumn 2016 he was the coach of the youth section of FK Sinđelić Beograd. In summer 2018. Golović start to work in youth section of Partizan.
