= 2001–02 Nemzeti Bajnokság I =

Nemzeti Bajnokság I
- Season: 2001–02
- Dates: 14 July 2001 – 25 May 2002
- Champions: Zalaegerszeg
- Relegated: Haladás; Vasas
- Champions League: Zalaegerszeg
- UEFA Cup: Ferencváros; Újpest
- Intertoto Cup: Kispest Honvéd
- Matches: 228
- Goals: 698 (3.06 per match)
- Top goalscorer: Attila Tököli (28)
- Biggest home win: Kispest 6–1 Haladás; Ferencváros 5–0 Haladás; Videoton 5–0 Újpest
- Biggest away win: Kispest 1–6 Györ; Haladás 0–5 MTK
- Highest scoring: Újpest 7–2 Kispest; Debrecen 6–3 Vasas

The 2001–02 Nemzeti Bajnokság I, also known as NB I, was the 100th season of top-tier football in Hungary. The league was officially named Borsodi Liga for sponsoring reasons. The season started on 14 July 2001 and ended on 26 May 2002.

== Overview ==
It was contested by 12 teams, and Zalaegerszegi TE won the championship for the first time in their history. Zalaegerszeg, guided by coach Péter Bozsik, only lost two home games throughout the campaign. ZTE's status as champions was confirmed in the 37th round, after a 1–1 draw against Ferencváros meant that Zalaegerszeg's 5 point lead over FTC was impossible to overcome.

== First stage ==
=== League standings ===
Pos	Team	Pld	W	D	L	GF	GA	GD	Pts	Qualification
1	MTK Hungária	33	20	4	9	56	34	+22	64	Qualification for championship playoff
2	Zalaegerszeg	33	18	7	8	65	40	+25	61	Qualification for championship playoff
3	Ferencváros	33	18	5	10	58	34	+24	59	Qualification for championship playoff
4	Dunaferr (Note: 6 points deducted for not paying a transfer fee)	33	15	8	10	62	38	+24	47	Qualification for championship playoff
5	Videoton	33	12	10	11	45	47	−2	46	Qualification for championship playoff
6	Újpest	33	12	8	13	58	57	+1	44	Qualification for championship playoff
7	Sopron	33	10	10	13	47	51	−4	40	Qualification for relegation playoff
8	Győr	33	9	11	13	45	57	−12	38	Qualification for relegation playoff
9	Kispest Honvéd	33	10	8	15	40	63	−23	38	Qualification for relegation playoff
10	Debrecen	33	7	15	11	34	45	−11	36	Qualification for relegation playoff
11	Haladás	33	8	11	14	41	62	−21	35	Qualification for relegation playoff
12	Vasas	33	6	9	18	42	65	−23	27	Qualification for relegation playoff

Source: rsssf.com

=== Results ===
==== Rounds 1–22 ====
Home \ Away	DEB	DUN	FTC	GYŐ	HAL	HON	MTK	SOP	UTE	VAS	VID	ZTE
Debrecen		2–2	0–1	1–1	2–0	2–2	0–3	1–0	4–0	2–2	0–1	1–1
Dunaferr	4–0		0–1	0–0	2–2	4–0	2–0	2–0	2–1	4–1	2–0	4–1
Ferencváros	0–1	0–3		3–1	3–1	0–2	1–3	3–3	2–1	2–0	4–0	0–1
Győr	0–1	2–2	1–1		3–3	2–1	1–1	1–3	1–1	2–3	0–0	0–1
Haladás	1–1	2–0	1–3	1–2		1–0	0–5	2–1	2–2	1–0	0–0	0–1
Kispest Honvéd	1–1	1–1	1–0	1–6	6–1		0–1	1–3	1–0	0–2	3–0	0–2
MTK Hungária	1–0	3–2	3–1	3–0	5–1	3–1		4–0	3–0	1–0	1–0	2–1
Sopron	2–2	2–2	1–2	4–0	1–1	2–3	0–0		1–4	2–1	1–4	3–2
Újpest	2–2	0–2	2–2	2–1	1–1	7–2	1–3	2–1		4–2	2–0	1–4
Vasas	1–1	2–1	1–3	1–1	2–1	1–2	0–1	0–2	0–2		1–3	1–2
Videoton	3–1	2–1	2–2	1–2	1–0	0–0	0–0	1–0	4–1	3–2		1–1
Zalaegerszeg	3–1	1–1	2–0	4–0	3–1	2–2	2–0	4–1	0–3	4–1	2–3	

Source: rsssf.com
Legend: Blue = home team win; Yellow = draw; Red = away team win.

==== Rounds 23–33 ====
Home \ Away	DEB	DUN	FTC	GYŐ	HAL	HON	MTK	SOP	UTE	VAS	VID	ZTE
Debrecen						0–0	4–3	0–0	1–1		0–0	1–6
Dunaferr	0–0		0–1	2–1					1–2		3–1	1–2
Ferencváros	0–1			4–0	5–0				2–0		4–1	2–0
Győr	2–1				1–0				3–2	2–1	1–1	1–3
Haladás	1–0	3–1				3–2	3–0	1–1		2–2		
Kispest Honvéd		0–3	0–4	1–4				1–0				1–0
MTK Hungária		1–4	0–1	2–1		0–0		1–0				
Sopron		2–0	2–1	2–2					3–1			2–0
Újpest					2–1	4–0	2–0			2–2	2–3	
Vasas	1–0	2–4	0–0			3–3	2–0	2–2				
Videoton					2–2	1–2	2–3	0–0		4–1		
Zalaegerszeg					2–2		2–0		1–1	2–2	3–1	

Source: rsssf.com
Legend: Blue = home team win; Yellow = draw; Red = away team win.

== Second stage ==
=== Championship playoff ===
==== League standings ====
Pos	Team	Pld	W	D	L	GF	GA	GD	Pts	Qualification
1	Zalaegerszeg (C)	38	21	8	9	76	47	+29	71	Qualification for Champions League second qualifying round
2	Ferencváros	38	21	6	11	66	39	+27	69	Qualification for UEFA Cup qualifying round
3	MTK Hungária	38	21	4	13	62	47	+15	67	
4	Dunaferr	38	17	8	13	71	47	+24	59	
5	Videoton	38	15	10	13	56	53	+3	55	
6	Újpest	38	14	8	16	65	69	−4	50	Qualification for UEFA Cup qualifying round (Note: Újpest FC won the 2001–02 Hungarian Cup and thereby qualified for the qualifying round of the UEFA Cup.)

Source: rsssf.com
(C) Champions

==== Results ====
Home \ Away	DUN	FTC	MTK	VID	UTE	ZTE
Dunaferr			5–1			
Ferencváros	2–0		1–0			
MTK Hungária				2–1	1–2	2–4
Videoton	2–1	1–2			5–0	
Újpest	1–2	3–2				1–2
Zalaegerszeg	3–1	1–1		1–2		

Source: rsssf.com
Legend: Blue = home team win; Yellow = draw; Red = away team win.

=== Relegation playoff ===
==== League standings ====
Pos	Team	Pld	W	D	L	GF	GA	GD	Pts	Qualification or relegation
7	Kispest Honvéd	38	12	11	15	51	70	−19	47	Qualification for Intertoto Cup first round
8	Sopron	38	10	14	14	54	60	−6	44	
9	Debrecen	38	9	17	12	47	53	−6	44	
10	Győr	38	10	14	14	51	64	−13	44	
11	Haladás (R)	38	9	13	16	48	71	−23	40	Relegation to Nemzeti Bajnokság II
12	Vasas (R)	38	7	11	20	51	78	−27	32	Relegation to Nemzeti Bajnokság II

Source: rsssf.com
(R) Relegated

==== Results ====
Home \ Away	DEB	GYŐ	HAL	HON	SOP	VAS
Debrecen			1–3	3–3	1–1	2–2
Győr	0–0			2–2		
Haladás		0–3 (Note: The match between Haladás and Győr (originally finished 0–0) was scored 0–3 because Haladás fielded a sixth foreign player.)				
Kispest Honvéd			1–1		2–0	3–1
Sopron		4–0	2–2			6–3
Vasas		1–1	2–1			

Source: rsssf.com
Legend: Blue = home team win; Yellow = draw; Red = away team win.

== Statistical leaders ==
=== Top goalscorers ===
Rank	Scorer	Club	Goals
1	(Hungary) Attila Tököli	Dunaffer SE	28
2	(Hungary) Krisztián Kenesei	Zalaegerszegi TE	21
3	(Hungary) Béla Illés	MTK Hungária	18
4	(Hungary) Mihály Tóth	FC Sopron	17
5	(Hungary) Gábor Egressy	Zalaegerszegi TE	16
5	(Romania) Marius Sasu	Kispest Honvéd FC	16
5	(Hungary) Róbert Waltner	Zalaegerszegi TE	16
8	(Hungary) István Ferenczi	MTK Hungária	14
8	(Hungary) Tibor Tokody	Újpest FC	14
10	(Hungary) Károly Szanyó	Győri ETO FC	13
11	(Hungary) Lajos Terjék	Videoton FC	12

== Attendances ==
#	Club	Average
1	Zalaegerszeg	9,234
2	Ferencváros	7,353
3	Szombathelyi Haladás	5,428
4	Debrecen	4,429
5	Sopron	3,650
6	Videoton	3,192
7	Újpest	3,148
8	Győr	3,014
9	Vasas	2,634
10	Dunaújváros	2,548
11	Kispest Honvéd	1,563
12	MTK	1,326

== See also ==
- 2001–02 Magyar Kupa
- 2001–02 Nemzeti Bajnokság II
- 2001–02 Nemzeti Bajnokság III
