= Dejan Poljaković =

Croatian footballer (born 1973)

Personal information
- Full name: Dejan Poljaković
- Date of birth: 6 April 1973 (age 53)
- Place of birth: Subotica, SFR Yugoslavia
- Height: 1.82 m (5 ft 11 1/2 in)
- Position: Midfielder

Senior career*
Years	Team	Apps	(Gls)
- Bačka Subotica
1997–2001	Spartak Subotica	15	(2)
2001–2002	Újpest	33	(3)
2003	Rijeka	0	(0)
- * Club domestic league appearances and goals

Dejan Poljaković (born 6 April 1973) is a Croatian retired footballer who played as a midfielder.

== Club career ==
Poljaković played his early career in Serbia. He played with FK Bačka 1901 before joining FK Spartak Subotica playing with them in the First League of FR Yugoslavia. In 2001, he joined Újpest FC and played in the Hungarian Nemzeti Bajnokság I in 2001–02. In 2002–03, he played with Ujpest til the winter-break, when he moved to HNK Rijeka playing in the Croatian First League.

== Honors ==
Ujpest

- Hungarian Cup: 2002
