= Csaba Somfalvi =

Hungarian footballer (born 1972)

Personal information
- Date of birth: 22 November 1972 (age 53)
- Place of birth: Szentgotthárd, Hungary
- Height: 1.78 m (5 ft 10 in)
- Position: Midfielder

Youth career
- Haladás

Senior career*
Years	Team	Apps	(Gls)
1992–1996	Haladás	73	(13)
1993	→ Körmend (loan)		
1996–1999	Zalaegerszeg	45	(3)
1998	→ Pécs (loan)	14	(1)
1999–2004	Haladás	110	(16)
2004–2005	Pápa	22	(2)
2005–2006	Rohrbach	0	(0)
2006–2007	Lafnitz	21	(10)
2007–2009	Pilgersdorf	53	(9)
2011	Rákosszentmihályi SC	1	(0)
2013–2015	Unterrabnitz	39	(8)
2016–2017	Szentpéterfa	20	(5)
Total		400	(67)

International career
1992	Hungary U21	3	(0)

Managerial career
- 2014–2015: Unterrabnitz (player-manager)
- 2015: Unterrabnitz
- 2015–2016: Unterrabnitz Reserve
- * Club domestic league appearances and goals

Csaba Somfalvi (born 22 November 1972) is a Hungarian football manager and former professional player who played as a midfielder. He represented Hungary at youth level.

== Futsal ==
In 2010, he undertook a new professional challenge by co-founding the Haladás futsal team, building the club from the ground up. Through sustained organizational and sporting development, the team gradually emerged as one of the leading forces in Hungarian futsal. This long-term effort culminated in a period of domestic dominance, as Haladás won the Nemzeti Bajnokság I, the top tier of Hungarian futsal, in four consecutive seasons between 2021 and 2024, firmly establishing the club as a prominent and successful presence in national competition.

== Personal life ==
Somfalvi's sons Barna and Bence are also footballers.

== Career statistics ==
=== As a player ===
Appearances and goals by club, season and competition
Club	Season	League			National cup (Note: Includes Magyar Kupa)		Other		Total	
Club	Season	Division	Apps	Goals	Apps	Goals	Apps	Goals	Apps	Goals
Haladás	1990–90	Nemzeti Bajnokság II	2	0	—		—		2	0
Haladás	1991–92	Nemzeti Bajnokság I	4	0	—		2 (Note: Appearance(s) in Nemzeti Bajnokság I relegation play-offs)	0	6	0
Haladás	1992–93	Nemzeti Bajnokság II	14	2	4	2	—		18	4
Haladás	1993–94	Nemzeti Bajnokság I	11	1	—		—		11	1
Haladás	1994–95	Nemzeti Bajnokság II	28	9	5	2	—		33	11
Haladás	1995–96	Nemzeti Bajnokság I	16	1	2	0	—		18	1
Haladás	Total		75	13	11	4	2	0	88	17
Zalaegerszeg	1996–97	Nemzeti Bajnokság I	25	2	2	0	—		27	2
Zalaegerszeg	1997–98	Nemzeti Bajnokság I	1	1	—		—		1	1
Zalaegerszeg	1998–99	Nemzeti Bajnokság I	19	0	3	0	—		22	0
Zalaegerszeg	Total		45	3	5	0	—		50	3
Pécs (loan)	1997–98	Nemzeti Bajnokság II	14	1	—		—		14	1
Haladás	1999–2000	Nemzeti Bajnokság I	25	5	2	0	—		27	5
Haladás	2000–01	Nemzeti Bajnokság I	13	2	3	2	—		16	4
Haladás	2000–01	Nemzeti Bajnokság II	10	3	1	0	—		11	3
Haladás	2001–02	Nemzeti Bajnokság I	23	0	3	0	—		26	0
Haladás	2002–03	Nemzeti Bajnokság II	16	4	—		—		16	4
Haladás	2003–04	Nemzeti Bajnokság I	23	2	1	0	1	1	25	3
Haladás	Total		110	16	10	2	1	1	121	19
Pápa	2004–05	Nemzeti Bajnokság I	22	2	1	0	—		23	2
Rohrbach	2005–06		0	0	—		—		0	0
Lafnitz	2006–07	Unterliga Ost	21	10	—		—		21	10
Pilgersdorf	2007–08	II. Liga Mitte	13	4	—		—		13	4
Pilgersdorf	2008–09	II. Liga Mitte	28	5	—		—		28	5
Pilgersdorf	2009–10	II. Liga Mitte	12	0	—		—		12	0
Pilgersdorf	Total		53	9	—		—		53	9
Rákosszentmihályi SC	2010–11	Megyei Bajnokság I	1	0	—		—		1	0
Unterrabnitz	2013–14	2. Klasse Mitte	14	4	—		—		14	4
Unterrabnitz	2014–15	2. Klasse Mitte	22	4	—		1 (Note: Appearance in Burgenland Cup)	0	23	4
Unterrabnitz	2015–16	2. Klasse Mitte	3	0	—		—		3	0
Unterrabnitz	Total		39	8	—		1	0	40	8
Szentpéterfa	2015–16	Megyei Bajnokság II	11	1	—		1 (Note: Appearance in Magyar Kupa qualifying rounds)	0	12	1
Szentpéterfa	2016–17	Megyei Bajnokság II	9	4	—		1 (Note: Appearance in Vas Megyei Kupa)	2	10	6
Szentpéterfa	Total		20	5	—		2	2	22	7
Career total			400	67	27	6	6	3	433	76

=== As a manager ===
Managerial record by team and tenure
Team	From	To	Record					Ref
Team	From	To	P	W	D	L	Win %	Ref
Unterrabnitz	1 July 2014	4 October 2015	33	14	2	17	42.42	
Unterrabnitz Reserve	2 August 2015	1 May 2016	15	4	0	11	26.67	
Total			48	18	2	28	37.50	

=== International ===
Appearances and goals by national team and year
National team	Year	Apps	Goals
Hungary U21	1992	3	0
Total		3	0

== Honours ==
Haladás

- Nemzeti Bajnokság II: 1990–91, 1992–93, 1994–95, 2000–01
- Magyar Kupa runner-up: 1992–93, 2001–02
