= Anton Mukhovykov =

Ukrainian footballer

Personal information
- Full name: Anton Volodymyrovych Mukhovykov
- Date of birth: 20 June 1984 (age 42)
- Place of birth: Dnipropetrovsk, Ukrainian SSR, Soviet Union
- Height: 1.75 m (5 ft 9 in)
- Position: Midfielder

Youth career
- 1998–1999: FC Dnipro-75 Dnipropetrovsk
- 1999: Dnipro Dnipropetrovsk
- 2000: Sports school 12 Dnipropetrovsk

Senior career*
Years	Team	Apps	(Gls)
2002	Borysfen-2 Boryspil	1	(1)
2002	Dynamo-3 Kyiv	11	(1)
2003–2005	Dynamo Khmelnytskyi	26	(2)
2006–2008	Nistru Otaci	33	(2)
2008–2010	Stal Alchevsk	58	(12)
2010–2011	Tavriya Simferopol	4	(0)
2011	Zakarpattia Uzhhorod	9	(0)
2011	Oleksandriya	5	(0)
2011–2012	Hoverla-Zakarpattia Uzhhorod	20	(5)
2012–2014	Tytan Armyansk	41	(2)
2014	Sumy	8	(1)
2015–2016	Mykolaiv	35	(2)
2016–2017	Sumy	29	(1)
- * Club domestic league appearances and goals as of 22 November 2017

Anton Mukhovykov (Ukrainian: Антон Володимирович Муховиков; born 20 June 1984) is a professional Ukrainian football midfielder.

== Career ==
Mukhovnykov began his playing career with different youth teams in Dnipropetrovsk. After playing in different Ukrainian clubs, he joined FC Nistru Otaci in Moldovan National Division, where he played during two years. Following that spell he returned to Ukraine.
