= Vladimir Nenadić =

Serbian footballer (1971–2022)

Personal information
- Date of birth: 20 February 1971
- Place of birth: SR Serbia, SFR Yugoslavia
- Date of death: 20 May 2022 (aged 51)
- Place of death: Bačka Palanka, Serbia
- Height: 1.80 m (5 ft 11 in)
- Position: Forward

Senior career*
Years	Team	Apps	(Gls)
1992	Bečej	12	(6)
1993	Vojvodina	3	(1)
1993–1996	Tatran Prešov	52	(12)
1996	Athinaikos	10	(0)
1997	Leganés		
1997–1999	Famalicão		
1999–2000	Ribeira Brava		
2000–2001	Belasitsa Petrich		
2001–2003	Debrecen	30	(11)
- * Club domestic league appearances and goals

Vladimir Nenadić (20 February 1971 – 20 May 2022) was a Serbian professional footballer who played as a forward.
