= Radek Slončík =

Czech footballer

Personal information
- Date of birth: 29 May 1973 (age 53)
- Place of birth: Šumperk, Czechoslovakia
- Height: 1.74 m (5 ft 9 in)
- Position: Midfielder

Youth career
- 1980–1987: LP Šumperk
- 1987–1991: FC Baník Ostrava

Senior career*
| Years | Team | Apps | (Gls) |
| 1991–2000 | FC Baník Ostrava | | |
| 2000–2001 | Sparta Prague | 13 | (0) |
| 2002–2003 | Újpest FC | 30 | (1) |
| 2003–2006 | FC Baník Ostrava | 64 | (3) |
| 2007–2008 | Fotbal Fulnek | 37 | (3) |
| 2009–2011 | MFK Karviná | 26 | (1) |

International career
| 1994–1996 | Czech Republic U-21 | 13 | (0) |
| 1996–2000 | Czech Republic | 17 | (0) |
- * Club domestic league appearances and goals

Radek Slončík (born 29 May 1973) is a Czech former footballer.

Slončík played in the position of midfielder and spent most of his career at Baník Ostrava. He had an unsuccessful time with Sparta Prague in 2000 and returned to Baník the next season. He was part of Baník Ostrava squad between 2003 and 2005, winning the 2004–05 Czech Cup.

After retiring from professional football at the end of 2010–11 Czech First League, Slončík began training youth footballers under the age of 17.
