= Geča =

Municipality of Slovakia

Geča Hernádgecse
- Municipality
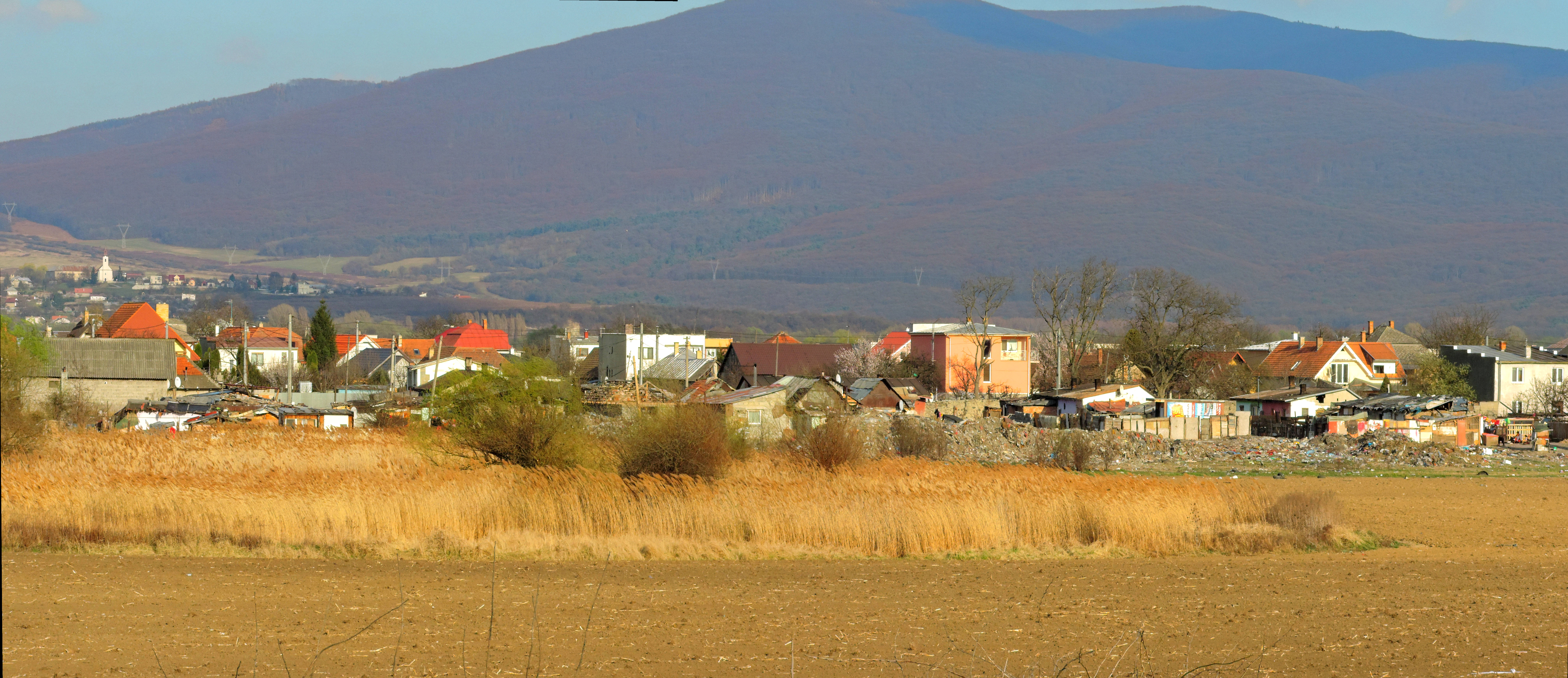

- Flag

- Location of Geča in the Košice Region Location of Geča in Slovakia
- Coordinates: 48.63°N 21.32°E
- Country: Slovakia
- Region: Košice Region
- District: Košice-okolie District
- First mentioned: 1255

Area
  - Total: 5.48 km^{2} (2.12 sq mi)
- Elevation: 181 m (594 ft)

Population (2025)
  - Total: 1,897
- Time zone: UTC+1 (CET)
  - Summer (DST): UTC+2 (CEST)
- Postal code: 441 3
- Area code: +421 55
- Vehicle registration plate (until 2022): KS
- Website: www.obecgeca.sk

Geča (Hungarian: Hernádgecse) is a village and municipality in Košice-okolie District in the Kosice Region of eastern Slovakia. As of 2022, it has a population of about 1862 people.

== History ==
In historical records the village was first mentioned in 1255.

== Geography ==
The municipality lies at an altitude of 181 metres (594 ft) and covers an area of 5.48 km^{2} (2.12 sq mi) (2025).

== Population ==
Population statistic (10 years)
Year	1995	2005	2015	2025
Count	1315	1519	1682	1897
Difference		+15.51%	+10.73%	+12.78%

Population statistic
Year	2024	2025
Count	1898	1897
Difference		−0.05%

It has a population of 1897 people (31 December 2025).

=== Ethnicity ===
Census 2021 (1+ %)
Ethnicity	Number	Fraction
Slovak	1748	95.93%
Not found out	42	2.3%
Romani	34	1.86%
Total	1822	

In year 2021 was 1822 people by ethnicity 1748 as Slovak, 42 as Not found out, 34 as Romani, 12 as Rusyn, 7 as Hungarian, 5 as Other, 3 as Russian, 2 as Czech, 2 as German, 1 as Jewish, 1 as Irish, 1 as Ukrainian, 1 as Italian and 1 as English.

Note on population: The difference values of population numbers in the table "Population statistic" and in the sections "Ethnicity" & "Religion" is caused by the use of various statistical methods.

=== Religion ===
Census 2021 (1+ %)
Religion	Number	Fraction
Roman Catholic Church	1459	80.08%
None	207	11.36%
Not found out	63	3.46%
Greek Catholic Church	36	1.98%
Total	1822	

In year 2021 was 1822 people by religion 1459 from Roman Catholic Church, 207 from None, 63 from Not found out, 36 from Greek Catholic Church, 17 from Calvinist Church, 16 from Evangelical Church, 9 from Eastern Orthodox Church, 5 from Other and not ascertained christian church, 3 from Christian Congregations in Slovakia, 3 from Ad hoc movements, 1 from Old Catholic Church, 1 from Other, 1 from United Methodist Church and 1 from Baptists Church.

== Genealogical resources ==
The records for genealogical research are available at the state archive "Statny Archiv in Kosice, Slovakia"

- Roman Catholic church records (births/marriages/deaths): 1787-1896 (parish B)
- Greek Catholic church records (births/marriages/deaths): 1791-1896 (parish B)

== See also ==
- List of municipalities and towns in Slovakia
