= Crișana (newspaper) =

Crişana
- Language: Romanian
- Headquarters: Oradea, Bihor, Crişana, Romania
- Sister newspapers: Crişana Plus; Al cincelea anotimp

Crişana is an important local newspaper based in Oradea (the informal capital of the Crişana region and the capital of Bihor county, Romania). It is one of the oldest local publications, being founded in 1945. The newspaper is published by SC Anotimp SA, a local publishing house. Anotimp currently distributes the following publications, part of the Crişana Group of Publications:

- Crişana (daily newspaper)
- Crişana Plus (Sunday newspaper)
- Al cincelea anotimp (monthly magazine)

The director of Crişana is Dan Matea.
