= Stadionul Crișana =

Multi-use stadium in Sebiș, Romania

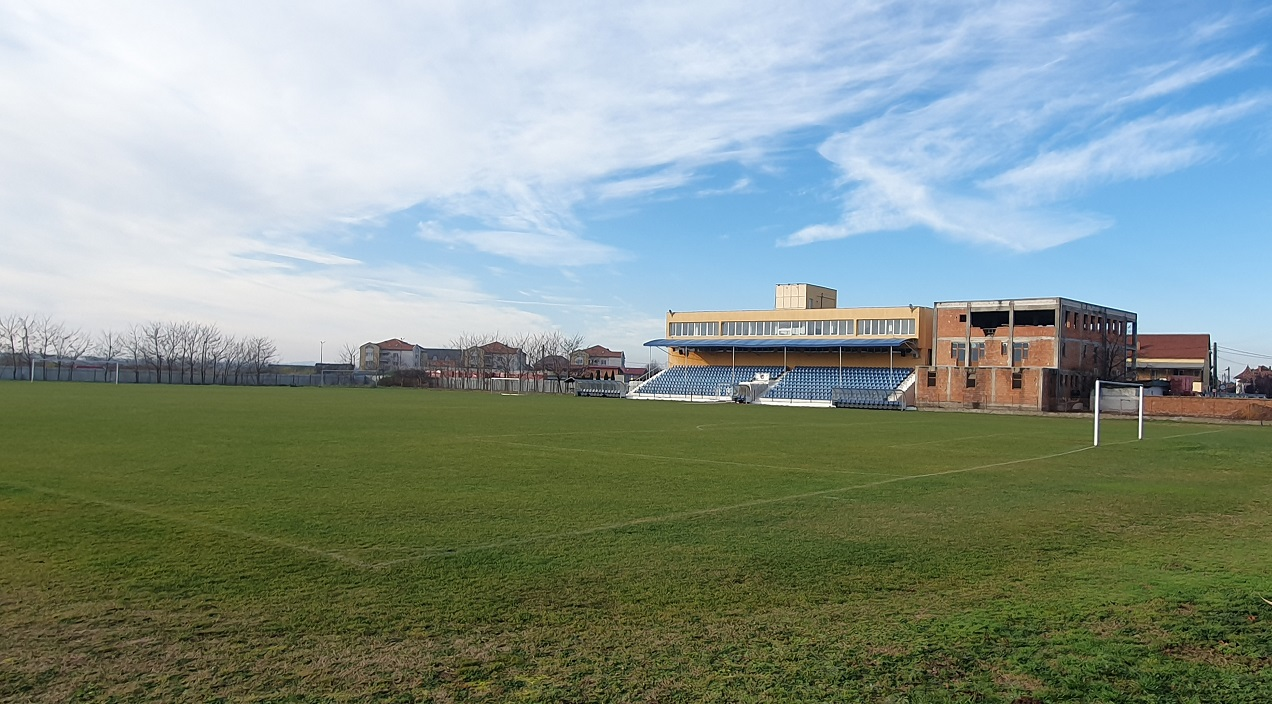
- Interactive map of Stadionul Crișana
- Address: Str. Piața Arenei, nr. 1
- Location: Sebiș, Romania
- Coordinates: 46°22′10.4″N 22°7′38.5″E
- Owner: Town of Sebiș
- Operator: Național Sebiș
- Capacity: 1,500 seated
- Surface: Grass

Construction
- Opened: 1920s
- Renovated: 2013–2014

Tenant
- Național Sebiș (1922–present)

Stadionul Crișana is a multi-use stadium in Sebiș, Romania. It is used mostly for football matches and is the home ground of Național Sebiș. The stadium holds 1,500 people.
