= Krisztián Tiber =

Hungarian footballer

Personal information
- Date of birth: 6 October 1972 (age 53)
- Place of birth: Hungary
- Position: Striker

Senior career*
Years	Team	Apps	(Gls)
-1993/94	Fehérvár FC	3	(0)
-1999	Gázszer FC	44+	(13+)
1999-2001	Vasas SC	44	(14)
2001-2002	Debreceni VSC	29	(6)
2002-2003/04	FC Sopron	13	(0)
-2008	ASKÖ Klingenbach		
2008-2010/11	USV St. Georgen		
2010/11-2013/14	SV Wimpassing		
2013/2014	SKV Altenmarkt		
2014-2015	FC Oslip		
- * Club domestic league appearances and goals

Krisztián Tiber (born 6 October 1972 in Hungary) is a Hungarian retired footballer.
