= Dorel Balint =

Romanian footballer

Personal information
- Full name: Marin Dorel Balint
- Date of birth: 14 January 1969 (age 57)
- Place of birth: Romania
- Height: 1.81 m (5 ft 11 in)
- Position: Defender

Senior career*
Years	Team	Apps	(Gls)
1992–1996	Brașov		
1997–2001	Oțelul Galați		
2001–2003	Honvéd Budapest	45	(4)
2003	Kecskeméti	1	(0)
Total		46	(4)

Managerial career
- 2023–: Național Sebiș
- * Club domestic league appearances and goals

Dorel Balint (born 14 January 1969) is a retired Romanian football defender.
