= Attila Plókai =

Hungarian footballer

Personal information
- Full name: Attila Plókai
- Date of birth: 17 July 1969 (age 57)
- Place of birth: Hungary
- Height: 1.85 m (6 ft 1 in)
- Position: Defender

Senior career*
Years	Team	Apps	(Gls)
1986–1991	Debreceni VSC	-	(-)
1991–2000	Budapest Honvéd FC	213	(26)
2000	Tampere United	1	(0)
2000–2001	Budapest Honvéd FC	21	(3)
2001–2002	Debreceni VSC	30	(3)
2002–2003	Lombard-Pápa TFC	16	(3)
2003–2005	Vasas SC	56	(9)
2005–2006	Budakalászi Munkás SE	23	(1)

International career
1996–1997	Hungary	7	(1)
- * Club domestic league appearances and goals

Attila Plókai (born 17 July 1969) is a Hungarian former football player. In the Hungarian championship, he was particularly feared for his free-kicks.

== Career statistics ==
=== International ===
Appearances and goals by national team and year
National team	Year	Apps	Goals
Hungary	1996	5	0
Hungary	1997	2	1
Total		7	1

Scores and results list Hungary's goal tally first, score column indicates score after each Plókai goal.

List of international goals scored by Attila Plókai
No.	Date	Venue	Opponent	Score	Result	Competition
1	19 March 1997	Ta' Qali National Stadium, Ta' Qali, Malta	Malta	4–1	4–1	Friendly

== Honours ==
Hungarian League:
Winner: 1993
Hungarian Cup:
Winner: 1996
