= Gábor Vincze =

Hungarian footballer

Personal information
- Full name: Gábor Vincze
- Date of birth: 7 September 1976 (age 50)
- Place of birth: Ózd, Hungary
- Height: 1.86 m (6 ft 1 in)
- Position: Midfielder

Senior career*
Years	Team	Apps	(Gls)
1995–1997	Ferencvárosi TC	3	(0)
1997–1998	Gázszer FC	33	(0)
1998–1999	III. Kerületi TUE	24	(0)
1999–2000	BVSC Budapest	34	(3)
2000–2002	FC Sopron	58	(1)
2002–2004	Debreceni VSC	44	(2)
2004–2005	Győri ETO FC	14	(0)
2005–2006	Livingston FC	32	(1)
2006–2007	Ethnikos Achnas	8	(1)
2007–2008	Budapest Honvéd FC	4	(0)
2008-2013	Biatorbágyi SE		

International career
2005	Hungary	1	(0)
- * Club domestic league appearances and goals

Gábor Vincze (born 7 September 1976) is a Hungarian retired football player. During his career he had a spell at Livingston in Scotland where he scored once against Rangers at Ibrox.
