= Károly Szanyó =

Hungarian footballer and manager

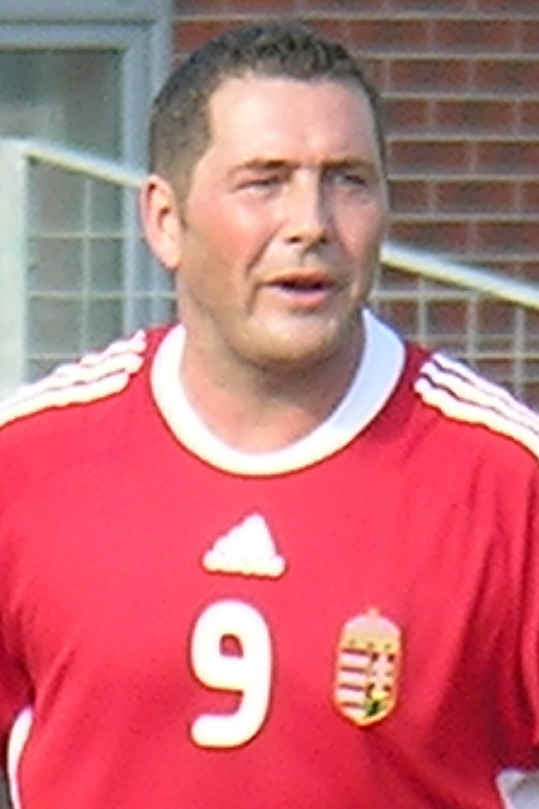
- Szanyó in 2011

Personal information
- Date of birth: 10 November 1973 (age 52)
- Place of birth: Budapest, Hungary
- Height: 1.83 m (6 ft 0 in)
- Position: Attacking midfielder

Senior career*
Years	Team	Apps	(Gls)
1992–1997	Újpest	92	(34)
1997	VfB Lübeck	2	(0)
1997–1999	Újpest FC	37	(9)
1999–2000	SV Ried	6	(0)
2000	Debreceni VSC		
2000–2001	Ironi Kiryat Ata		
2001–2003	Győri ETO	57	(24)
2003–2004	Újpest	12	(3)
2005	Vasas SC	22	(2)
2005–2006	Union Perg		

International career
1996	Hungary U23		

Managerial career
- 2014–2015: Vasas SC
- 2017: Kozármisleny
- 2017: Csákvár
- 2018–2019: Vasas SC
- * Club domestic league appearances and goals

Karoly Szanyo (born 10 November 1973) is a Hungarian reformer professional football player and manager. He was a member of the Hungary squad that reached the 1996 Summer Olympics finals in Atlanta, United States.
