= Tamás Takács (footballer, born 1979) =

Hungarian footballer

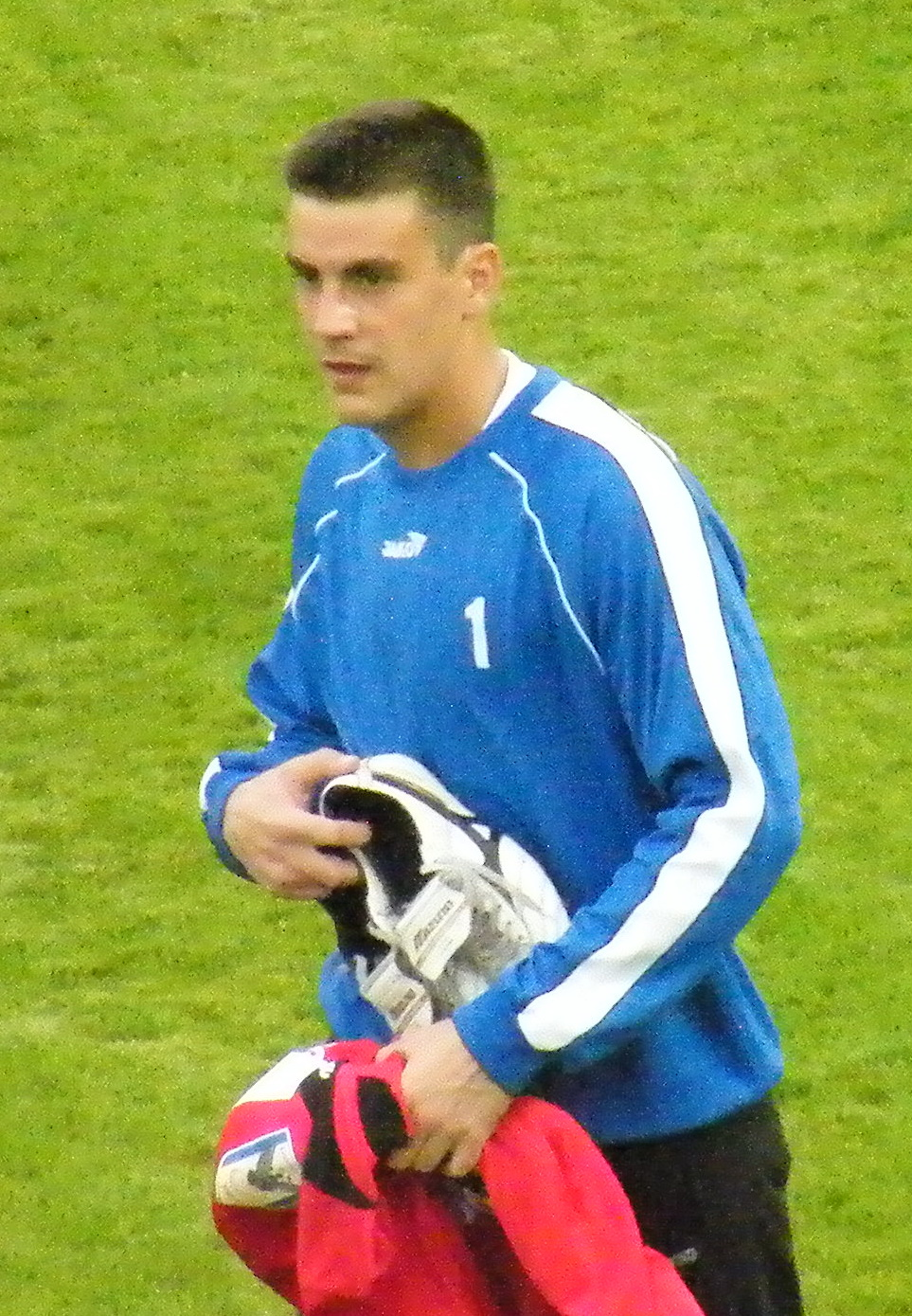

Personal information
- Full name: Tamás Takács
- Date of birth: 5 September 1979 (age 47)
- Place of birth: Szombathely, Hungary
- Height: 1.85 m (6 ft 1 in)
- Position: Goalkeeper

Team information
- Current team: Lombard-Pápa TFC
- Number: 1

Youth career
- 1993–1998: Szombathelyi Haladás

Senior career*
Years	Team	Apps	(Gls)
1999–2002	Szombathelyi Haladás	36	(0)
2003–2004	Debreceni VSC	1	(0)
2004–2006	Diósgyőri VTK	2	(0)
2005–2006	→ Budapest Honvéd FC (loan)	12	(0)
2006–2008	FC Sopron	17	(0)
2008	Nyíregyháza Spartacus	1	(0)
2008–2009	CF Liberty Salonta	?	(?)
2009–2012	Lombard-Pápa TFC	1	(0)

International career
1996–1997	Hungary U-17	4	(0)
1999–2001	Hungary U-21	10	(0)
- * Club domestic league appearances and goals as of 30 June 2012

Tamás Takács (born 5 September 1979 in Szombathely, Hungary) is a Hungarian football player who currently plays for Lombard-Pápa TFC

== Career in NB I ==
Tamás Takács has played in 105 matches in the Hungarian First Division.
