= István Szekér =

Hungarian footballer

Personal information
- Date of birth: 25 December 1970 (age 55)
- Place of birth: Várpalota, Hungary
- Height: 1.89 m (6 ft 2 in)
- Position: Defender

Youth career
- Varpalota Bantasz

Senior career*
| Years | Team | Apps | (Gls) |
| –1997 | Szombathelyi Haladás | | |
| 1997–1998 | Willem II | 8 | (0) |
| 1998–1999 | MTK Budapest | | |
| 1999–2000 | Budapest Honvéd | | |
| 2000–2001 | Geel | | |
| 2001–2002 | MTK Budapest | | |
| 2002–2003 | SV Mattersburg | | |
| 2003–2004 | SV Neuberg | | |
| 2004 | Dunaferr SE | | |
| 2004–2005 | Lombard Pápa | | |
| 2005–2006 | Dunaújváros FC | 9 | (1) |
- * Club domestic league appearances and goals

István Szekér (born 25 December 1970) is a Hungarian former professional footballer who played as a defender.
