= András Kaj =

Hungarian footballer

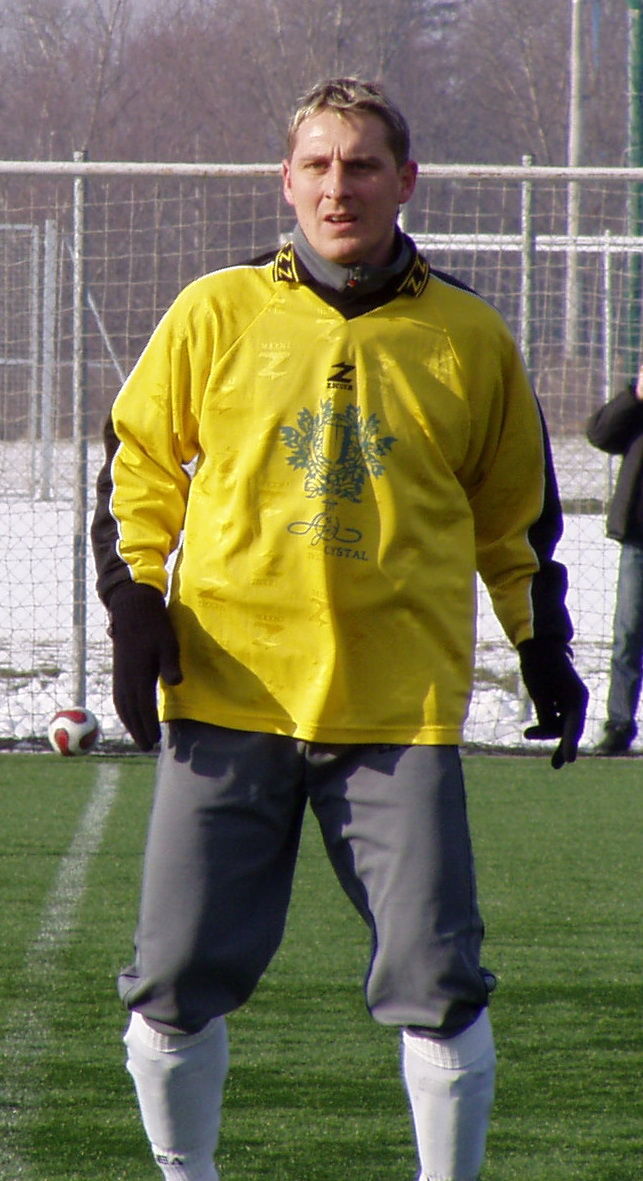

Personal information
- Full name: András Kaj
- Date of birth: 21 December 1977 (age 48)
- Place of birth: Hungary
- Height: 1.84 m (6 ft 0 in)
- Position: Midfielder

Team information
- Current team: Kávás KSE
- Number: 12

Youth career
- Zalaegerszegi TE

Senior career*
Years	Team	Apps	(Gls)
- TK Raszter SE
- ASKÖ Lackendorf
1999–2004	Szombathelyi Haladás		
2004–2006	Zalaegerszegi TE	17	(0)
2006–2008	Szombathelyi Haladás	32	(0)
2009–2010	FC Ajka	36	(1)
2010–2014	SC Pinkafeld	103	(14)
2014–2015	Páterdomb LSC	5	(0)
2016	Andráshida BLSC	11	(4)
2016–2018	Helsa Andráshida TE	3	(0)
2020–	Kávás KSE	7	(6)
- * Club domestic league appearances and goals

András Kaj (born 21 December 1977) is a Hungarian football player who currently plays for Kávás KSE.

== Professional career ==
Kaj has made over 100 appearances in the Hungarian First Division. He began his playing career in the lower division of Hungarian football, and after a brief spell in Austria, he made his Hungarian First Division debut at the age of 22 playing for Szombathelyi Haladás in a match against Kispest Honvéd on 6 August 1999.

Kaj would spend the next five seasons with Haladás until the club went bankrupt. Subsequently, he moved to Zalaegerszegi TE, but after two seasons, he would return to Haladás to help the club back into the top flight by winning the 2007–08 Hungarian Second Division championship.

== Honours ==
Hungarian Second Division:
Winner: 2008
