= Robert Vágner =

Czech footballer

Personal information
- Date of birth: 12 May 1974 (age 52)
- Place of birth: Plzeň, Czechoslovakia-
- Height: 1.81 m (5 ft 11 in)
- Position: Striker

Youth career
- 1982–1983: Lokomotiva Plzeň
- 1983–1993: Škoda Plzeň

Senior career*
Years	Team	Apps	(Gls)
1993–1995	Viktoria Plzeň	47	(9)
1995–2000	Slavia Prague	136	(39)
2000–2001	Teplice	20	(2)
2001–2002	Újpest	31	(10)
2002–2004	Energie Cottbus	47	(5)
2004–2005	Ferencváros	20	(6)
2005–2006	Viktoria Plzeň	27	(5)
Total		328	(76)

International career
1993–1996	Czech Republic U21	6	(1)
1995–1999	Czech Republic	2	(0)
Medal record
SK Slavia Prague
Winner	Gambrinus liga	1995–96
- * Club domestic league appearances and goals

Robert Vágner (born 12 May 1974 in Plzeň) is a Czech former footballer who played as a striker. He played international football for the Czech Republic. Vágner played 230 times in the top division of the Czech Republic, the Czech First League. He played for one season in the Bundesliga with FC Energie Cottbus.

== Honours ==
Újpest

- Hungarian Cup: 2001-02
