= 2001–02 Magyar Kupa =

Tournament details
- Country: Hungary

Final positions
- Champions: Újpest
- Runners-up: Szombathelyi Haladás

The 2001–02 Magyar Kupa (English: Hungarian Cup) was the 62nd season of Hungary's annual knock-out cup football competition.

== Quarter-finals ==
Games were played on March 5 and 6, 2002.

Team 1	Score	Team 2
Újpest	2–0	Sopron
Szombathelyi Haladás	0–0 (a.e.t.); 3–2 (pen.)	Győri ETO
Szekszárd	0–0 (a.e.t.); 2–4 (pen.)	Tatabánya
Dunaújváros	2–0	Videoton

== Semi-finals ==
Games were played on April 2 and 3, 2002.

Team 1	Score	Team 2
Dunaújváros	2–3	Szombathelyi Haladás
Tatabánya	2–2 (a.e.t.); 2–4 (pen.)	Újpest

== Final ==
1 May 2002
18:00 (UTC+2)

Újpest	2–1 (a.e.t.)	Szombathelyi Haladás
Vágner 26', 120'	Report	Halmosi 74'

ETO Park, Győr
Attendance: 10,000
Referee: Attila Ábrahám (Hungary)

== See also ==
- 2001–02 Nemzeti Bajnokság I
- 2001–02 Nemzeti Bajnokság II
- 2001–02 Nemzeti Bajnokság III
