= 1997–98 Újpesti TE season =

Újpest
1997–98 season
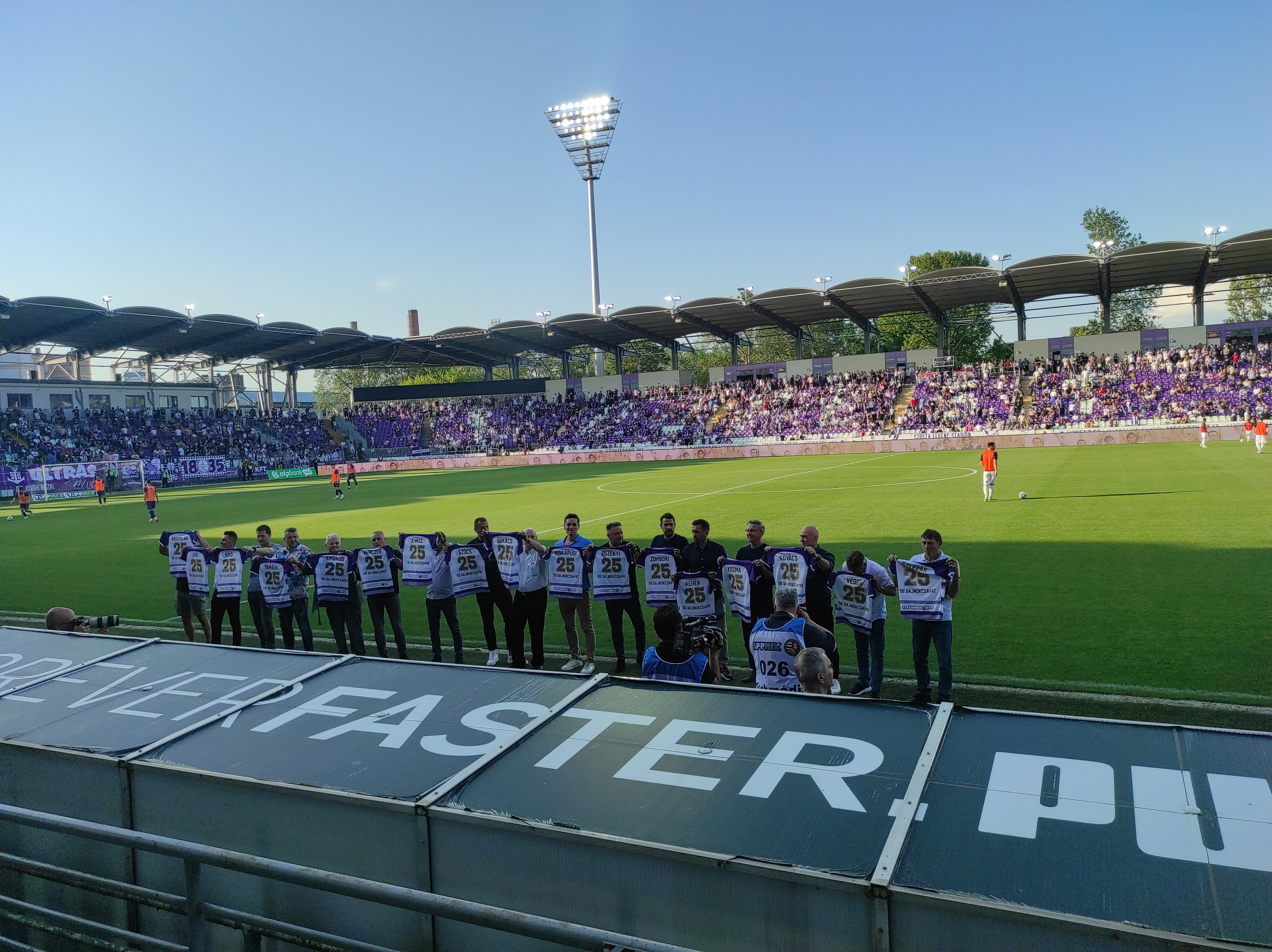
- 25th Anniversary Reunion of the league winning team
- Manager: László Nagy (until 9 August); Péter Várhidi (from 9 August)
- Stadium: Megyeri úti stadion
- Nemzeti Bajnokság I: 1st
- Magyar Kupa: Runners-up
- UEFA Cup: Second qualifying round
- Top goalscorer: League: Miklós Herczeg (12)
- Average home league attendance: 6,500
- Biggest win: 6–0 vs KÍ Klaksvík (H) (23 July 1997); UEFA Cup
- Biggest defeat: By one goal (5 matches)

The 1997–98 season was Újpesti Torna Egylet's 92nd competitive season, 86th consecutive season in the Nemzeti Bajnokság I and 112th year in existence as a football club. In addition to the domestic league, Újpest participated in this season's editions of the Magyar Kupa and UEFA Cup.

The season started against KÍ Klaksvík in the UEFA Cup and ended with an aggregate score of 9–2. Their next opponents were AGF from Denmark, whom they lost to in the second qualifying round. Újpest were losing finalist in the Magyar Kupa.

The team made an unbeaten run in away games and on 30 May, it became certain that they would win their 20th top-flight title with a draw against Videoton at Sóstói Stadion. This is the last league title Újpest have won.

== First team squad ==
Note: Flags indicate national team as defined under FIFA eligibility rules; some limited exceptions apply. Players may hold more than one non-FIFA nationality.

No.	Pos.	Nation	Player
—	MF	HUN	Sándor Jenei
—	DF	HUN	Zoltán Szlezák (captain)
—	DF	HUN	Csaba Fehér
—	DF	HUN	Vilmos Sebők
—	MF	HUN	Ferenc Babati
—	MF	HUN	Norbert Tóth
—	FW	HUN	Károly Szanyó
—	FW	HUN	Miklós Herczeg
—	MF	HUN	Krisztián Kvasz
—	DF	HUN	Balázs Kiskapusi
—	MF	HUN	János Árgyelán

No.	Pos.	Nation	Player
—	MF	HUN	Balázs Bérczy
—	GK	HUN	Szabolcs Bíró
—	FW	HUN	Dénes Eszenyi
—	FW	YUG	Goran Kopunović
—	FW	HUN	Attila Korsós
—	MF	HUN	István Kozma
—	DF	NGA	Precious Monye
—	MF	HUN	Tamás Pető
—	MF	HUN	Zoltán Tamási
—	MF	HUN	György Véber
—	GK	HUN	Balázs Zele

== Transfers ==
=== Summer ===
In: Note: Flags indicate national team as defined under FIFA eligibility rules; some limited exceptions apply. Players may hold more than one non-FIFA nationality.

No.	Pos.	Nation	Player
—	MF	HUN	Norbert Tóth (from Videoton)
—	FW	HUN	Károly Szanyó (from (Germany) Lübeck)
—	FW	HUN	Dénes Eszenyi (from (Germany) Eintracht Trier)
—	FW	YUG	Goran Kopunović (from (Cyprus) Larnaca)
—	MF	HUN	István Kozma (from (Cyprus) APOEL)
—	DF	NGA	Precious Monye (on loan from (Italy) Reggiana)
—	MF	HUN	Tamás Pető (from Videoton)

Out: Note: Flags indicate national team as defined under FIFA eligibility rules; some limited exceptions apply. Players may hold more than one non-FIFA nationality.

No.	Pos.	Nation	Player
—	MF	HUN	Péter Kovács (on loan to (Switzerland) La Neuveville-Lamboing)
—	MF	HUN	Zoltán Mátyás (to Dunaferr)

=== Winter ===
In: Note: Flags indicate national team as defined under FIFA eligibility rules; some limited exceptions apply. Players may hold more than one non-FIFA nationality.

No.	Pos.	Nation	Player
—	MF	HUN	János Árgyelán (from Videoton)
—	GK	HUN	Szabolcs Bíró (from Videoton)
—	MF	HUN	Attila Korsós (from Videoton)

Out: Note: Flags indicate national team as defined under FIFA eligibility rules; some limited exceptions apply. Players may hold more than one non-FIFA nationality.

No.	Pos.	Nation	Player
—	FW	HUN	Zoltán Kovács (to (Greece) PAOK)
—	MF	HUN	Zalán Zombori (to Vasas)
—	GK	HUN	Lajos Szűcs (to (Germany) Kaiserslautern)

== Competitions ==
=== Overview ===
Competition	Starting round	Final position	Record							
Competition	Starting round	Final position	Pld	W	D	L	GF	GA	GD	Win %
Nemzeti Bajnokság I	Matchday 1	Winners	34	21	10	3	62	26	+36	61.76
Magyar Kupa	Round of 32	Runners-up	5	4	0	1	11	4	+7	80.00
UEFA Cup	First qualifying round	Second qualifying round	4	2	1	1	11	5	+6	50.00
Total			43	27	11	5	84	35	+49	62.79

Source: Competitions

=== Nemzeti Bajnokság I ===
==== League table ====
Pos	Team	Pld	W	D	L	GF	GA	GD	Pts	Qualification or relegation
1	Újpest (C)	34	21	10	3	62	26	+36	73	Qualification for Champions League first qualifying round
2	Ferencváros	34	20	7	7	63	43	+20	67	Qualification for UEFA Cup first qualifying round
3	Vasas	34	19	7	8	66	41	+25	64	
4	Győr	34	18	9	7	47	31	+16	63	
5	MTK Hungária	34	17	7	10	60	35	+25	58	Qualification for Cup Winners' Cup qualifying round

Source: rsssf.com
(C) Champions

==== Results summary ====
Overall								Home						Away					
Pld	W	D	L	GF	GA	GD	Pts	W	D	L	GF	GA	GD	W	D	L	GF	GA	GD
34	21	10	3	62	26	+36	73	11	3	3	38	16	+22	10	7	0	24	10	+14

Source: Competitions

==== Matches ====
19 July 1997 1	Újpest	3–0	Tiszakécske	Budapest
19:00 CEST (UTC+2)	Szanyó 1', 62'; Jenei (yellow card) 73'; Tóth 75'; Kovács (yellow card) 81'	Report	Szántó (yellow card) 18'; Barna (yellow card) 53'; Cimpian (yellow card) 60'	Stadium: Megyeri úti stadion Attendance: 4,000; Referee: László Molnár

26 July 1997 2	Zalaegerszeg	1–2	Újpest	Zalaegerszeg
19:00 CEST (UTC+2)	Kámán 5', (yellow card) 42'; Caşolţan (yellow card) 5'; B. Molnár (yellow card) 46'	Report	Kiskapusi (yellow card) 20'; Herczeg 24'; Tóth 80'	Stadium: ZTE Arena; Attendance: 12,000; Referee: Attila Ábrahám

2 August 1997 3	Újpest	2–3	Győr	Budapest
17:00 CEST (UTC+2)	Szanyó 4'; Tóth (yellow card) 42'; Fehér (yellow card) 68'; Véber (yellow card) 74'; Sălăgean 80' (o.g.)	Report	Vayer 46'; Fodor 54'; Stark (yellow card) 81'; Mracskó 90+1'	Stadium: Megyeri úti stadion Attendance: 3,000; Referee: Sándor Puhl

9 August 1997 4	Újpest	2–2	Vác	Budapest
19:00 CEST (UTC+2)	Kovács 27', 72'; Monye (yellow card) 48'	Report	Lévai 8', (yellow card) 70'; Andrássy 11'; Boda (yellow card) 45'; Babos (yellow card) 73'	Stadium: Megyeri úti stadion Attendance: 3,500; Referee: Zooltán Kurmai

23 August 1997 5	Diósgyőr	0–2	Újpest	Miskolc
17:00 CEST (UTC+2)	Kiser (yellow card) 26'; Farkas (yellow card) 81'	Report	Herczeg (yellow card) 24', (goal) 58'; Kovács 66'; Monye (yellow card) 70'; Sebők (yellow card) 74'	Stadium: Diósgyőri Stadion; Attendance: 22,000; Referee: László Vágner

31 August 1997 6	Újpest	1–1	MTK	Budapest
14:30 CEST (UTC+2)	Csertői (yellow card) 17'; Halmai 26' (pen.); Madar (yellow card) 61'; Egressy (yellow card) 63'	Report	Kiskapusi (yellow card) 25'; Kovács (yellow card) 30', (goal) 48'; Sebők (yellow card) 40'	Stadium: Megyeri úti stadion Attendance: 6,000; Referee: Sándor Piller

3 September 1997 7	Gázszer	1–2	Újpest	Székesfehérvár
19:00 CEST (UTC+2)	Bekő 21', (yellow card) 43'; Salacz (yellow card) 90'	Report	Monye (yellow card) 27', (goal) 65'; Fehér (yellow card) 57'; Sebők (yellow card) 82'; Véber 90' (pen.)	Stadium: Sóstói Stadion; Attendance: 4,000; Referee: Sándor Varga

13 September 1997 8	Újpest	2–0	Siófok	Budapest
19:00 CEST (UTC+2)	Pető (yellow card) 53'; Herczeg 59'; Kiskapusi 67'; Kozma (yellow card) 75'; Zombori (yellow card) 90+1'	Report	Juhász (yellow card) 31'; Sallai (yellow card) 58'	Stadium: Megyeri úti stadion Attendance: 4,000; Referee: Géza Kiss

21 September 1997 9	BVSC	0–1	Újpest	Budapest
18:00 CEST (UTC+2)	Zováth (yellow card) 15'; László (yellow card) 27'	Report	Kovács 17'	Stadium: Szőnyi úti Stadion; Attendance: 10,000; Referee: Sándor Puhl

24 September 1997 10	Újpest	4–0	Stadler	Budapest
16:00 CEST (UTC+2)	Véber 45' (pen.); Tóth 49'; Pető 56'; Babati 80'	Report	Schultz (yellow card) 27'; Kertész (yellow card) 45'; Korol (yellow card) 72'	Stadium: Megyeri úti stadion Attendance: 4,000; Referee: József Bukovics

27 September 1997 11	Haladás	1–1	Újpest	Szombathely
19:00 CEST (UTC+2)	M. Tóth (yellow card) 11'; Plókai 47', (yellow card) 70'; Koller (yellow card) 68'	Report	Herczeg 2'; Fehér (yellow card) 28'; Véber (yellow card) 42'	Stadium: Stadion Rohonci Út; Attendance: 6,000; Referee: Attila Hanacsek

4 October 1997 12	Újpest	1–2	Vasas	Budapest
17:00 CEST (UTC+2)	Véber 23' (pen.), (yellow card) 88'; Kovács (yellow card) 55'; Fehér (yellow card) 83'	Report	Váczi 42'; Hámori (yellow card) 78'; Kuntić 84'; Szilveszter (yellow card) 87'	Stadium: Megyeri úti stadion Attendance: 7,000; Referee: Vencel Tóth

19 October 1997 13	Debrecen	1–2	Újpest	Debrecen
14:30 CEST (UTC+2)	J. Szabó (yellow card) 16'; Z. Pető (yellow card) 52'; Đurišić (yellow card) 59'; Szatmári (yellow card) 61'; Sira 88'	Report	Monye (yellow card) 20'; Herczeg 36'; T. Pető (yellow card) 59'; Szlezák (yellow card) 65'; Véber 74', (yellow card) 90+2'	Stadium: Oláh Gábor utcai Stadion; Attendance: 9,000; Referee: István Vad Sr.

3 November 1997 14	Újpest	1–2	Ferencváros	Budapest
19:00 CET (UTC+1)	Fehér (yellow card) 15'; Sebők (yellow card) 49'; Véber 66' (pen.)	Report	Hrutka 24'; Nyilas (yellow card) 66'; Lipcsei 81' (pen.)	Stadium: Megyeri úti stadion Attendance: 12,000; Referee: Attila Juhos

8 November 1997 15	Békéscsaba	1–2	Újpest	Békéscsaba
13:00 CET (UTC+1)	Balog (yellow card) 45'; Fazekas 62'; Futaki (yellow card) 73'	Report	Sebők (yellow card) 27' (yellow-red card) 55'; Eszenyi 30'; Szanyó 32'	Stadium: Kórház utcai Stadion; Attendance: 5,000; Referee: Sándor Puhl

19 November 1997 16	Újpest	2–1	Videoton	Budapest
17:00 CET (UTC+1)	Zombori (yellow card) 24'; Szanyó 38'; Herczeg 45'	Report	Korsós (yellow card) 9'; Schindler (yellow card) 25'; Dvéri 40'; Mokrytskyi (yellow card) 55'	Stadium: Megyeri úti stadion Attendance: 3,000; Referee: Zoltán Kurmai

24 November 1997 17	Kispest Honvéd	0–2	Újpest	Budapest
19:00 CET (UTC+1)	Hungler (yellow card) 8'; Pintér (yellow card) 19'; Plókai (yellow card) 40'; Farkas (yellow card) 58'	Report	Sebők 2'; Kiskapusi (yellow card) 64'; Kovács 74'	Stadium: Bozsik József Stadion; Attendance: 4,000; Referee: Sándor Varga

28 February 1998 18	Tiszakécske	0–0	Újpest	Tiszakécske
14:00 CET (UTC+1)	Major (yellow card) 3'; Molnár (yellow card) 50' (yellow-red card) 65'; Holló (yellow card) 59'	Report	Sebők (yellow card) 26'; Korsós (yellow card) 53'; Véber (yellow card) 56'	Stadium: Városi Stadion; Attendance: 8,500; Referee: Tamás Arany

8 March 1998 19	Újpest	1–0	Zalaegerszeg	Budapest
14:30 CET (UTC+1)	Fehér (yellow card) 25'; Korsós (yellow card) 30', (goal) 88'; Pető (yellow card) 42' (yellow-red card) 87'	Report	Kámán (yellow card) 2'; Németh (yellow card) 15'; Kocsárdi (yellow card) 22'; Arany (yellow card) 69'; Filó (yellow card) 74'	Stadium: Megyeri úti stadion Attendance: 4,000; Referee: Zsolt Szabó

14 March 1998 20	Győr	1–1	Újpest	Győr
17:00 CET (UTC+1)	Somogyi (yellow card) 25'; Fodor 52'; Stark (yellow card) 58'	Report	Herczeg (yellow card) 23', (goal) 76'; Tamási (yellow card) 43'; Kvasz (yellow card) 50' (yellow-red card) 62'	Stadium: Stadion ETO; Attendance: 15,000; Referee: László Vágner

18 March 1998 21	Vác	0–1	Újpest	Vác
18:00 CET (UTC+1)	Korsós (yellow card) 22'; Szlezák (yellow card) 35'; Tóth 55'; Tamási (yellow card) 79'	Report	Strasser (yellow card) 81'	Stadium: Ligeti Stadion; Attendance: 5,000; Referee: Attila Hanacsek

21 March 1998 22	Újpest	2–0	Diósgyőr	Budapest
15:00 CET (UTC+1)	Fehér (yellow card) 6'; Korsós (yellow card) 45', (goal) 67'; Herczeg 75'	Report	Kákóczki (yellow card) 6'; Nagy (yellow card) 12' (yellow-red card) 41'	Stadium: Megyeri úti stadion Attendance: 8,000; Referee: Attila Juhos

30 March 1998 23	MTK	1–2	Újpest	Budapest
18:45 CEST (UTC+2)	Orosz 23'; Kuttor (yellow card) 29'; Halmai (yellow card) 68' (yellow-red card) 90+1'	Report	Tamási (yellow card) 7'; Pető 16'; Jenei 88' (pen.)	Stadium: Hungária körúti Stadion; Attendance: 6,000; Referee: Sándor Piller

4 April 1998 24	Újpest	2–1	Gázszer	Budapest
17:00 CEST (UTC+2)	Pető (yellow card) 20'; Sebők 40'; Korsós 90'	Report	Nagy (yellow card) 19', (goal) 51'; Vincze (yellow card) 21'	Stadium: Megyeri úti stadion Attendance: 7,000; Referee: László Cserna

11 April 1998 25	Siófok	1–1	Újpest	Siófok
19:00 CEST (UTC+2)	Sallai (yellow card) 32'; Kriston 37'; Juhász (yellow card) 60'; Szabadi (yellow card) 85'	Report	Sebők (yellow card) 52'; Tóth 58'; Fehér (yellow card) 66'	Stadium: Révész Géza utcai Stadion; Attendance: 12,000; Referee: Ferenc Bede

15 April 1998 26	Újpest	1–0	BVSC	Budapest
17:00 CEST (UTC+2)	Tóth 61'	Report	László (yellow card) 80'	Stadium: Megyeri úti stadion Attendance: 5,000; Referee: István Vad Sr.

26 April 1998 27	Stadler	0–3	Újpest	Akasztó
19:00 CEST (UTC+2)	Rosca (yellow card) 40'; Molnár (yellow card) 63'	Report	Tóth (yellow card) 38', (goal) 72'; Herczeg 43', 76'; Tamási (yellow card) 55'; Sebők (yellow card) 90+2'	Stadium: Stadler Stadion; Attendance: 10,000; Referee: Attila Ábrahám

29 April 1998 28	Újpest	3–1	Haladás	Budapest
17:00 CEST (UTC+2)	Szlezák 27'; Kvasz (yellow card) 35'; Fehér 47', 68'	Report	Koller (yellow card) 45'; Negrău 74'	Stadium: Megyeri úti stadion Attendance: 4,000; Referee: Sándor Varga

3 May 1998 29	Vasas	0–0	Újpest	Budapest
19:00 CEST (UTC+2)	Váczi (yellow card) 58'; Galaschek (yellow card) 59'; Szilveszter (yellow card) 70'; Zombori (yellow card) 73'	Report	Tamási (yellow card) 61'; Pető (yellow card) 86'	Stadium: Fáy utcai stadion Attendance: 18,000; Referee: István Vad Sr.

9 May 1998 30	Újpest	5–0	Debrecen	Budapest
19:00 CEST (UTC+2)	Herczeg 17', 75'; Tóth 20'; Szlezák (yellow card) 34'; T. Pető 62'; Eszenyi 88'	Report	Böőr (yellow card) 15'; Bernáth (yellow card) 66'; Z. Pető (yellow card) 88'	Stadium: Megyeri úti stadion Attendance: 11,000; Referee: Tamás Arany

17 May 1998 31	Ferencváros	1–1	Újpest	Budapest
19:00 CEST (UTC+2)	Miriuță (red card) 45'; Vincze (yellow card) 74'; Szűcs 74'; Vámosi (red card) 90'	Report	Herczeg (yellow card) 19'; Sebők 20' (pen.); Monye (red card) 45'; Kopunović (yellow card) 87'; Tamási (red card) 90'	Stadium: Üllői úti stadion Attendance: 17,577; Referee: László Vágner

23 May 1998 32	Újpest	4–1	Békéscsaba	Budapest
17:00 CEST (UTC+2)	Pető 15'; Sebők (yellow card) 23'; Fehér (yellow card) 57'; Eszenyi 62', 66', 81' (pen.)	Report	Valentényi 42'; Dávid (yellow card) 60' (yellow-red card) 89'	Stadium: Megyeri úti stadion Attendance: 10,000; Referee: Attila Hajdó

30 May 1998 33	Videoton	1–1	Újpest	Székesfehérvár
17:00 CEST (UTC+2)	Szabó (yellow card) 41'; Tóth (yellow card) 66'; Waltner 74'	Report	Tamási (yellow card) 26'; Kiskapusi (yellow card) 55'; Kopunović 85'	Stadium: Sóstói Stadion; Attendance: 12,000; Referee: Géza Kiss

6 June 1998 34	Újpest	2–2	Kispest Honvéd	Budapest
17:00 CEST (UTC+2)	Eszenyi 18'; Pető (yellow card) 25'; Korsós 49'	Report	Borgulya 5'; Baranyi 43'	Stadium: Megyeri úti stadion Attendance: 15,000; Referee: Attila Ábrahám

=== Magyar Kupa ===
The club joined the tournament in the round of 32 as participants of the UEFA Cup.

Round of 32	Szabadegyháza	0–4	Újpest

Round of 16	Haladás	2–3	Újpest

Quarter-finals	Újpest	2–1	Gázszer

Semi-finals	Újpest	2–0	Salgótarján

13 May 1998 Final	MTK	1–0	Újpest	Budapest
20:00 CEST (UTC+2)	Illés (yellow card) 9'; Szabados (yellow card) 29'; Kuttor 73'; Molnár (yellow card) 75'	Report	Pető (yellow card) 15'; Korsós (yellow card) 76'	Stadium: Fáy utcai stadion Attendance: 12,000; Referee: Vencel Tóth

=== UEFA Cup ===
==== First qualifying round ====
23 July 1997 First leg	Újpest (Hungary)	6–0	(Faroe Islands) KÍ	Budapest, Hungary
17:00 CEST (UTC+2)	Kovács 6', 12', 87'; Herczeg 9', 27'; Jenei 38'	Report		Stadium: Megyeri úti stadion Referee: Marco Tura (San Marino)

30 July 1997 Second leg	KÍ (Faroe Islands)	2–3 (2–9 agg.)	(Hungary) Újpest	Toftir, Faroe Islands
18:00 WEST (UTC+1)	Danielsen 14'; Jacobsen (yellow card) 32'; Mørkøre 73'	Report	Fehér (yellow card) 16'; Zombori (yellow card) 21'; Herczeg (red card) 29'; Szanyó 39'; Sebők 77', 89'	Stadium: Svangaskarð
Note: Újpest won 9–2 on aggregate.

==== Second qualifying round ====
12 August 1997 First leg	Újpest (Hungary)	0–0	(Denmark) AGF	Budapest, Hungary
19:00 CEST (UTC+2)	Zombori (yellow card) 78'	Report	Bjerre (yellow card) 13'; Mølby (yellow card) 72'	Stadium: Megyeri úti stadion

26 August 1997 Second leg	AGF (Denmark)	3–2 (3–2 agg.)	(Hungary) Újpest	Aarhus, Denmark
19:00 CEST (UTC+2)	Rieper 25'; Mølby (yellow card) 41'; Hallum 53', (yellow card) 55'; Sørensen 55'; Larsen (yellow card) 85'	Report	Sebők 31'; Kiskapusi (yellow card) 33'; Kovács 65'; Babati (yellow card) 81'; Sebők (yellow card) 89'	Stadium: Aarhus Stadium
Note: Aarhus GF won 3–2 on aggregate.

== Statistics ==
=== Appearances and goals ===
No.	Pos	Nat	Player	Total		Nemzeti Bajnokság I		UEFA Cup	
No.	Pos	Nat	Player	Apps	Goals	Apps	Goals	Apps	Goals
	GK	(Hungary) HUN	Szabolcs Bíró	16	0	16	0	0	0
	GK	(Hungary) HUN	Balázs Zele	1	0	1	0	0	0
	DF	(Hungary) HUN	Zoltán Szlezák	35	1	31	1	4	0
	DF	(Hungary) HUN	Vilmos Sebők	35	6	31	3	4	3
	DF	(Hungary) HUN	Csaba Fehér	32	2	28	2	4	0
	DF	(Hungary) HUN	Balázs Kiskapusi	28	1	24	1	4	0
	DF	(Hungary) HUN	Tamás Pető	22	4	22	4	0	0
	DF	(Nigeria) NGA	Precious Monye	21	1	17	1	4	0
	MF	(Hungary) HUN	Norbert Tóth	34	8	30	8	4	0
	MF	(Hungary) HUN	István Kozma	29	0	29	0	0	0
	MF	(Hungary) HUN	Sándor Jenei	27	2	24	1	3	1
	MF	(Hungary) HUN	György Véber	24	5	22	5	2	0
	MF	(Hungary) HUN	Ferenc Babati	16	1	12	1	4	0
	MF	(Hungary) HUN	Zoltán Tamási	16	0	16	0	0	0
	MF	(Hungary) HUN	Krisztián Kvasz	13	0	12	0	1	0
	MF	(Hungary) HUN	Balázs Bérczy	7	0	7	0	0	0
	MF	(Hungary) HUN	János Árgyelán	2	0	1	0	1	0
	FW	(Hungary) HUN	Miklós Herczeg	35	14	33	12	2	2
	FW	(Hungary) HUN	Dénes Eszenyi	18	6	16	6	2	0
	FW	(Hungary) HUN	Károly Szanyó	17	6	13	5	4	1
	FW	(Hungary) HUN	Attila Korsós	15	4	15	4	0	0
	FW	(Federal Republic of Yugoslavia) YUG	Goran Kopunović	3	1	3	1	0	0
Players loaned out (for full season):
	MF	(Hungary) HUN	Péter Kovács	0	0	0	0	0	0
Players left the club (from summer):
	MF	(Guinea) GUI	Mohamed Tawal Camara	1	0	0	0	1	0
Players left the club (from winter):
	GK	(Hungary) HUN	Lajos Szűcs	21	0	17	0	4	0
	MF	(Hungary) HUN	Zalán Zombori	12	0	9	0	3	0
	FW	(Hungary) HUN	Zoltán Kovács	21	10	17	6	4	4

=== Goalscorers ===
Rank	Nat.	Name	Nemzeti Bajnokság I	UEFA Cup	Total
1	(Hungary)	Miklós Herczeg	12	2	14
2	(Hungary)	Zoltán Kovács	6	4	10
3	(Hungary)	Norbert Tóth	8	0	8
4	(Hungary)	Vilmos Sebők	3	3	6
4	(Hungary)	Dénes Eszenyi	6	0	6
4	(Hungary)	Károly Szanyó	5	1	6
7	(Hungary)	György Véber	5	0	5
8	(Hungary)	Tamás Pető	4	0	4
8	(Hungary)	Attila Korsós	4	0	4
10	(Hungary)	Csaba Fehér	2	0	2
10	(Hungary)	Sándor Jenei	1	1	2
12	(Hungary)	Zoltán Szlezák	1	0	1
12	(Hungary)	Balázs Kiskapusi	1	0	1
12	(Nigeria)	Precious Monye	1	0	1
12	(Hungary)	Ferenc Babati	1	0	1
12	(Federal Republic of Yugoslavia)	Goran Kopunović	1	0	1
Own goals			1	0	1
Total			62	11	73

=== Hat-tricks ===
Player	Against	Result	Date	Competition	Round
(Hungary) Zoltán Kovács	KÍ Klaksvík	6–0 (H)	23 July 1997	UEFA Cup	QR1
(Hungary) Dénes Eszenyi	Békéscsaba	4–1 (H)	23 May 1998	Nemzeti Bajnokság I	32

=== Disciplinary record ===
Pos.	Nat.	Name	Nemzeti Bajnokság I			UEFA Cup			Total		
Pos.	Nat.	Name	Booked	(yellow card) (yellow-red card)	Sent off (straight red)	Booked	(yellow card) (yellow-red card)	Sent off (straight red)	Booked	(yellow card) (yellow-red card)	Sent off (straight red)
DF	(Hungary)	Vilmos Sebők	9	1	1				9	1	1
DF	(Hungary)	Csaba Fehér	8		1	1			9		1
DF	(Hungary)	Tamás Pető	6	1					6	1	
MF	(Hungary)	Zoltán Tamási	6		1				6		1
DF	(Hungary)	Balázs Kiskapusi	4			1			5		
MF	(Hungary)	György Véber	5						5		
DF	(Nigeria)	Precious Monye	4		1				4		1
FW	(Hungary)	Miklós Herczeg	3					1	3		1
FW	(Hungary)	Attila Korsós	4						4		
MF	(Hungary)	Zalán Zombori	2			2			4		
DF	(Hungary)	Zoltán Szlezák	3						3		
FW	(Hungary)	Zoltán Kovács	3						3		
MF	(Hungary)	Krisztián Kvasz	2	1					2	1	
MF	(Hungary)	Norbert Tóth	2						2		
MF	(Hungary)	István Kozma	1						1		
MF	(Hungary)	Sándor Jenei	1						1		
MF	(Hungary)	Ferenc Babati				1			1		
FW	(Federal Republic of Yugoslavia)	Goran Kopunović	1						1		
Totals			64	3	3	5	0	1	69	3	5

=== Clean sheets ===
Rank	Nat.	Name	Nemzeti Bajnokság I	UEFA Cup	Total
1	(Hungary)	Lajos Szűcs	6	2	8
1	(Hungary)	Szabolcs Bíró	8	0	8
3	(Hungary)	Balázs Zele	0	0	0
Total			14	2	16
