= György Véber =

Hungarian football manager (born 1969)

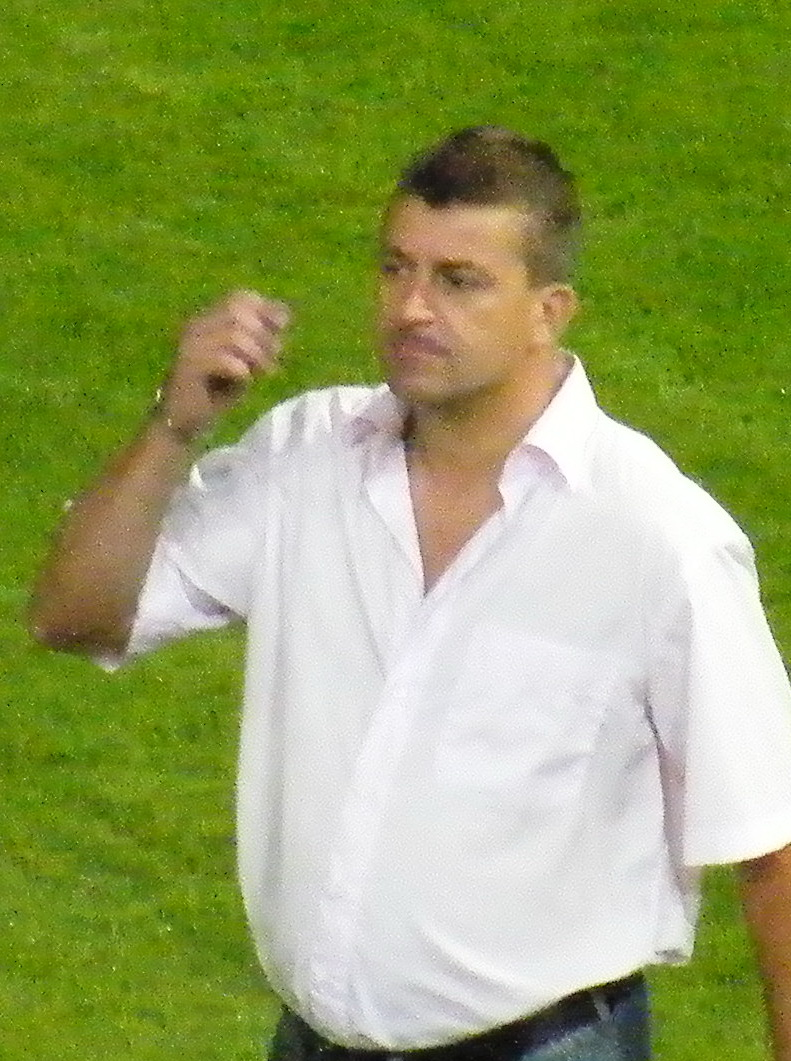
- Véber in 2010

Personal information
- Date of birth: 25 July 1969 (age 57)
- Place of birth: Szeged, Hungary
- Height: 1.74 m (5 ft 9 in)
- Position: Midfielder

Youth career
- –1988: Szeged SC

Senior career*
Years	Team	Apps	(Gls)
1988–1989	Szeged SC	14	(1)
1989–1995	Újpest	129	(14)
1995–1996	Hapoel Haifa	13	(0)
1996	Győr	5	(0)
1996–2000	Újpest	68	(19)
2000	Dunakeszi	16	(6)
2000	Csepel	9	(3)
2000–2001	BVSC	19	(0)
2001–2002	Tatabánya	22	(4)
2002–2003	Rákospalota	30	(5)
2006–2008	Somogyvár		
Total		325	(52)

International career
1992–1994	Hungary	3	(0)

Managerial career
- 2004–2005: Újpest (assistant)
- 2005–2006: Fót
- 2006–2008: Somogyvár (player-manager)
- 2006–2007: Tura
- 2008: Mosonmagyaróvár
- 2008–2011: Pápa
- 2012–2014: Mezőkövesd
- 2014: Pécs
- 2015: Somos
- 2015–2016: Rákosmente
- 2016–2017: Nyíregyháza
- 2018–2020: Fővárosi Vízművek
- 2020: Rákosmente
- * Club domestic league appearances and goals

György Véber (born 25 July 1969) is a Hungarian former professional football manager and player who played as a midfielder. He spent most of his playing career with Újpest, where he became a fan favourite. Between 1992 and 1994, he made three appearances for the Hungary national team.

== Managerial career ==
=== Assistant at Újpest ===
Véber was appointed assistant manager of Nemzeti Bajnokság I club Újpest on 19 February 2004, joining manager Géza Mészöly, who had signed a contract until the end of the season following the departure of technical director György Mezey. He had previously worked with Mészöly at Nemzeti Bajnokság II club Rákospalota, where he had played under him. On 30 May 2005, Újpest announced that Véber would leave his assistant coaching role at the beginning of the next pre-season and take charge of the club's youth team alongside József Kiprich.

=== Fót ===
On 9 July 2005, Véber was appointed manager of Nemzeti Bajnokság III Duna Group club Fót, the reserve side of Újpest, alongside former Újpest player Zoltán Szlezák. The team provided young Újpest players with an opportunity to demonstrate their readiness for promotion to the senior squad. He resigned in April 2006 after a disagreement with the club's president, who had reportedly given him an ultimatum to collect four points from the following two matches or face dismissal.

=== Somogyvár ===
In 2006, Véber joined Megyei Bajnokság I Somogy club Somogyvár as a player-manager, replacing László Konrád. He described the appointment as an interesting challenge, having moved away from Budapest to manage in the county's top division.

=== Tura ===
Véber began the 2006–07 season as joint manager of Nemzeti Bajnokság III Mátra Group club Tura alongside Dénes Eszenyi. The team finished the autumn half of the season in third place, but the managerial partnership ended during the spring after their relationship with the club's leadership deteriorated. He and Eszenyi were in charge for only five rounds of the spring season before Attila Berla was appointed as their successor.

=== Mosonmagyaróvár ===
In July 2008, Véber left Nemzeti Bajnokság III club Mosonmagyaróvár by mutual agreement, having initially been expected to remain in charge following the club's relegation from Nemzeti Bajnokság II. The club's president cited family reasons as contributing to his departure. Péter Hannich was appointed as his successor.

=== Pápa ===
On 7 December 2008, Véber was appointed manager of Nemzeti Bajnokság II West Group club Pápa, replacing László Kovács, who had taken over from Flórián Urbán earlier in the season. Despite the club sitting sixth in the league at the time of his appointment, promotion remained the stated objective.

He led Pápa to promotion to Nemzeti Bajnokság I during the second half of the 2008–09 season, overcoming a ten-point deficit and recording 14 wins, one draw and no defeats during the successful promotion campaign. The team subsequently retained its top-flight status in both the 2009–10 and 2010–11 seasons. On 24 October 2011, Véber left Pápa by mutual agreement after the club's poor run of results at the beginning of the 2011–12 season. Pápa had collected only five points from its previous nine league matches and two points from its last five. He had managed the club in 88 league matches, recording 38 wins, 14 draws and 36 defeats. Assistant manager László Kovács took over on an interim basis.

=== Mezőkövesd ===
On 21 March 2012, Véber was appointed manager of Nemzeti Bajnokság II East Group club Mezőkövesd, replacing György Szabados, whose departure by mutual agreement followed the team's poor results and ninth-place position in the league. His contract ran until 30 June 2013. On 7 June, following Mezőkövesd's promotion to Nemzeti Bajnokság I under his management, Véber agreed to a two-year contract extension. Ahead of the club's first season in the top division, he planned to strengthen the squad by signing six or seven experienced players, while allowing three or four players to leave on loan or permanently.

== Career statistics ==
=== Club ===
Appearances and goals by club, season and competition
Club	Season	League			National cup (Note: Includes Magyar Kupa)		Europe		Other		Total	
Club	Season	Division	Apps	Goals	Apps	Goals	Apps	Goals	Apps	Goals	Apps	Goals
Szeged SC	1988–89	Nemzeti Bajnokság II	14	1			—		—		14	1
Újpest	1988–89	Nemzeti Bajnokság I	4	0			—		—		4	0
Újpest	1989–90	Nemzeti Bajnokság I	8	1			—		—		8	1
Újpest	1990–91	Nemzeti Bajnokság I	10	0			1 (Note: Appearance in European Cup)	0	—		11	0
Újpest	1991–92	Nemzeti Bajnokság I	29	3			—		—		29	3
Újpest	1992–93	Nemzeti Bajnokság I	23	2	4	2	2 (Note: Appearances in European Cup Winners' Cup)	0	3 (Note: One appearance in Szuperkupa, two appearances and one goal in Nemzeti Bajnokság I relegation play-offs)	1	32	5
Újpest	1993–94	Nemzeti Bajnokság I	29	6	5	2	—		—		34	8
Újpest	1994–95	Nemzeti Bajnokság I	26	2	10	10	—		—		36	12
Újpest	Total		129	14	19	14	3	0	3	1	154	29
Hapoel Haifa	1995–96	Liga Leumit	13	0			—		—		13	0
Győr	1995–96	Nemzeti Bajnokság I	5	0	—		—		—		5	0
Újpest	1995–96	Nemzeti Bajnokság I	9	1	2	0	—		—		11	1
Újpest	1996–97	Nemzeti Bajnokság I	30	13	4	1	—		—		34	14
Újpest	1997–98	Nemzeti Bajnokság I	22	5	2	0	2 (Note: Appearances in UEFA Cup)	0	—		26	5
Újpest	1998–99	Nemzeti Bajnokság I	—		—		—		—		—	
Újpest	1999–2000	Nemzeti Bajnokság I	7	0	1	0	—		—		8	0
Újpest	Total		68	19	9	1	2	0	—		79	20
Dunakeszi	1999–2000	Nemzeti Bajnokság II	16	6	—		—		—		16	6
Csepel	2000–01	Nemzeti Bajnokság II	9	3	4	0	—		—		13	3
BVSC	2000–01	Nemzeti Bajnokság II	19	0	1	0	—		—		20	0
Tatabánya	2001–02	Nemzeti Bajnokság II	22	4	4	1	5 (Note: Appearances in UEFA Intertoto Cup)	1	—		31	6
Rákospalota	2002–03	Nemzeti Bajnokság II	30	5	2	0	—		—		32	5
Career total			325	52	39	16	10	1	3	1	377	70

=== International ===
Appearances and goals by national team and year
Team	Year	Total	
Team	Year	Apps	Goals
Hungary	1992	1	0
Hungary	1994	2	0
Total		3	0

== Honours ==
=== Player ===
Újpest

- Nemzeti Bajnokság I: 1989–90, 1997–98
- Magyar Kupa: 1991–92; runner-up: 1997–98
- Szuperkupa: 1992

=== Manager ===
Mezőkövesd

- Nemzeti Bajnokság II – East: 2012–13
