= List of Budapesti VSC seasons =

Budapesti Vasutas Sport Club is a professional Hungarian football club based in Zugló, Budapest, Hungary.

== Key ==
Nemzeti Bajnokság I

- Pld = Matches played
- W = Matches won
- D = Matches drawn
- L = Matches lost
- GF = Goals for
- GA = Goals against
- Pts = Points
- Pos = Final position

Hungarian football league system

- NBI = Nemzeti Bajnokság I
- NBII = Nemzeti Bajnokság II
- NBIII = Nemzeti Bajnokság III
- MBI = Megyei Bajnokság I

Magyar Kupa

- F = Final
- SF = Semi-finals
- QF = Quarter-finals
- R16 = Round of 16
- R32 = Round of 32
- R64 = Round of 64
- R128 = Round of 128

UEFA

- F = Final
- SF = Semi-finals
- QF = Quarter-finals
- Group = Group stage
- PO = Play-offs
- QR3 = Third qualifying round
- QR2 = Second qualifying round
- QR1 = First qualifying round
- PR = Preliminary round

Winners	Runners-up	Third	Promoted	Relegated

== Seasons ==
As of 25 May 2026.

Season	League										Cup	UEFA		Manager	Ref.
Season	Tier	Div	Pld	W	D	L	GF	GA	Pts.	Pos.	Cup	Competition	Result	Manager	Ref.
1958–59	1	NBI	26	6	6	14	26	39	18	12th		Did not qualify		(Hungary) Moór	
1959–60	1	NBI	26	3	10	13	27	48	16	14th	NH	Did not qualify		(Hungary) Moór	
1991–92	1	NBI	30	7	12	11	29	34	26	10th	?	Did not qualify		(Hungary) Kisteleki	
1992–93	1	NBI	30	10	6	14	32	37	26	12th	?	Did not qualify		(Hungary) Both, (Hungary) Garaba	
1993–94	1	NBI	30	7	10	13	32	52	24	12th	?	Did not qualify		(Hungary) Egervári	
1994–95	1	NBI	30	14	4	12	51	46	46	6th	?	Did not qualify		(Hungary) Egervári	
1995–96	1	NBI	30	18	7	5	50	29	61	2nd	?	Did not qualify		(Hungary) Egervári	
1996–97	1	NBI	30	14	7	13	43	36	49	6th	?	UEFA Cup	QR	(Hungary) Dajka, (Hungary) Mezey	
1997–98	1	NBI	30	12	10	12	49	43	46	10th	?	UEFA Cup Winners' Cup	1R	(Hungary) Bognár	
1998–99	1	NBI	34	7	6	21	34	53	26	17th	?	Did not qualify		(Hungary) Sándor, (Serbia) Sekulić, (Hungary) Tajti	
1999–00	2	NBII	38	13	12	13	50	44	51	13th		Did not qualify			
2000–01	2	NBII	20	8	5	7	31	30	29	5th		Did not qualify			
2001–02	3	NBIII	26	13	6	7	55	31	45	4th		Did not qualify			
2002–03	3	NBIII	30	12	8	10	44	39	44	7th		Did not qualify			
2003–04	2	NBII	30	4	9	17	35	65	21	15th		Did not qualify			
		Between 2004 and 2011 BVSC did not compete in any competitions.										Did not qualify			
2012–13	7	MBIV ↑	26	22	3	1	123	13	69	1st		Did not qualify			
2013–14	6	MBIII ↑	26	22	2	2	72	22	68	1st		Did not qualify			
2014–15	5	MBII	30	14	7	9	67	54	49	6th		Did not qualify			
2015–16	5	MBII	30	14	7	9	72	48	49	6th		Did not qualify			
2016–17	5	MBII	30	19	9	2	68	24	62	4th		Did not qualify			
2017–18	5	MBII	30	21	7	2	106	21	70	3rd		Did not qualify			
2018–19	5	MBII ↑	28	25	3	0	112	12	78	1st		Did not qualify			
2019–20	4	MBI ↑	17	14	3	0	61	7	45	1st		Did not qualify			
2020−21	3	NBIII	38	24	6	8	75	39	78	2nd		Did not qualify			
2021–22	3	NBIII	38	28	4	6	93	32	88	2nd	?	Did not qualify		(Hungary)	
2022–23	3	NBIII	38	32	6	0	101	15	102	1st	R64	Did not qualify		(Hungary) Urbán	
2023–24	2	NBII	34	10	8	16	27	40	38	13th	R64	Did not qualify		(Hungary) Urbán, (Hungary) Feczkó, (Hungary) Szekeres	
2024–25	2	NBII	30	8	14	8	31	32	38	9th		Did not qualify			
2025–26	2	NBII	30	12	5	13	36	30	41	7th		Did not qualify			

Notes: In the 2016-17 season 4 points were deducted.
