= Szabolcs Bíró =

Hungarian footballer (born 1969)

Personal information
- Date of birth: 12 February 1969 (age 57)
- Place of birth: Miskolc, Hungary
- Height: 1.88 m (6 ft 2 in)
- Position: Goalkeeper

Youth career
- Kazincbarcika

Senior career*
| Years | Team | Apps | (Gls) |
| 1992–1994 | Nyíregyháza | 50 | (0) |
| 1994–1995 | MTK | 30 | (0) |
| 1995–1996 | Vasas | 1 | (0) |
| 1996–1998 | Videoton | 45 | (0) |
| 1998–2001 | Újpest | 112 | (0) |
| 2001–2002 | Debrecen | 23 | (0) |
| 2002–2003 | Rákospalota | 15 | (0) |
| 2003–2004 | Vasas | 2 | (0) |
| 2004–2006 | Budakalász | 23 | (0) |
| Total | | 301 | (0) |
- * Club domestic league appearances and goals

Szabolcs Bíró (born 12 February 1969) is a Hungarian former professional footballer who played as a goalkeeper.

== Club career ==
On 7 July 2001, Bíró signed a three-year contract with Nemzeti Bajnokság I club Debrecen, the reigning Magyar Kupa winners, joining from Újpest ahead of the club's UEFA Cup qualifying campaign.

== Coaching career ==
On 18 June 2019, Bíró was appointed goalkeeping coach of Nemzeti Bajnokság II club Csákvár, replacing Lajos Szűcs, whom he had earlier succeeded as a player at Újpest in 1998. On 25 May 2021, he left Csákvár upon the expiry of his contract, departing alongside manager Ede Višinka and the rest of the coaching staff.

== Career statistics ==
Appearances and goals by club, season and competition
| Club | Season | League | | | Magyar Kupa | | Europe | | Other | | Total | |
| Club | Season | Division | Apps | Goals | Apps | Goals | Apps | Goals | Apps | Goals | Apps | Goals |
|---|---|---|---|---|---|---|---|---|---|---|---|---|
| Nyíregyháza | 1992–93 | Nemzeti Bajnokság I | 21 | 0 | 2 | 0 | — | | — | | 23 | 0 |
| Nyíregyháza | 1993–94 | Nemzeti Bajnokság II | 29 | 0 | — | | — | | — | | 29 | 0 |
| Nyíregyháza | Total | | 50 | 0 | 2 | 0 | — | | — | | 52 | 0 |
| MTK | 1994–95 | Nemzeti Bajnokság II | 30 | 0 | 4 | 0 | — | | — | | 34 | 0 |
| Vasas | 1995–96 | Nemzeti Bajnokság I | 1 | 0 | 6 | 0 | 3 (Note: Appearances in UEFA Intertoto Cup) | 0 | — | | 10 | 0 |
| Videoton | 1996–97 | Nemzeti Bajnokság I | 29 | 0 | 5 | 0 | — | | — | | 34 | 0 |
| Videoton | 1997–98 | Nemzeti Bajnokság I | 16 | 0 | 2 | 0 | — | | — | | 18 | 0 |
| Videoton | Total | | 45 | 0 | 7 | 0 | — | | — | | 52 | 0 |
| Újpest | 1997–98 | Nemzeti Bajnokság I | 16 | 0 | 3 | 0 | — | | — | | 19 | 0 |
| Újpest | 1998–99 | Nemzeti Bajnokság I | 34 | 0 | 3 | 0 | 6 (Note: Four appearances in UEFA Champions League, two appearances in UEFA Cup) | 0 | — | | 43 | 0 |
| Újpest | 1999–2000 | Nemzeti Bajnokság I | 32 | 0 | 3 | 0 | 2 (Note: Appearances in UEFA Cup) | 0 | — | | 37 | 0 |
| Újpest | 2000–01 | Nemzeti Bajnokság I | 30 | 0 | 3 | 0 | — | | — | | 33 | 0 |
| Újpest | Total | | 112 | 0 | 12 | 0 | 8 | 0 | — | | 132 | 0 |
| Debrecen | 2001–02 | Nemzeti Bajnokság I | 23 | 0 | 2 | 0 | 2 | 0 | — | | 27 | 0 |
| Debrecen | 2002–03 | Nemzeti Bajnokság I | 0 | 0 | 0 | 0 | — | | — | | 0 | 0 |
| Debrecen | Total | | 23 | 0 | 2 | 0 | 2 | 0 | — | | 27 | 0 |
| Rákospalota | 2002–03 | Nemzeti Bajnokság II | 15 | 0 | — | | — | | — | | 15 | 0 |
| Vasas | 2003–04 | Nemzeti Bajnokság II | 2 | 0 | 5 | 0 | — | | — | | 7 | 0 |
| Budakalász | 2004–05 | Nemzeti Bajnokság III | | | — | | — | | 2 (Note: Appearances in Nemzeti Bajnokság III promotion play-offs) | 0 | 2 | 0 |
| Budakalász | 2005–06 | Nemzeti Bajnokság II | 23 | 0 | — | | — | | — | | 23 | 0 |
| Budakalász | Total | | 23 | 0 | — | | — | | 2 | 0 | 25 | 0 |
| Career total | | | 301 | 0 | 38 | 0 | 13 | 0 | 2 | 0 | 354 | 0 |

== Honours ==
MTK

- Nemzeti Bajnokság II – East: 1994–95

Újpest

- Nemzeti Bajnokság I: 1997–98
- Magyar Kupa runner-up: 1997–98
