= Zoltán Tamási =

Hungarian footballer (born 1972)

Personal information
- Date of birth: 15 July 1972 (age 54)
- Place of birth: Budapest, Hungary
- Height: 1.85 m (6 ft 1 in)
- Position: Defender

Senior career*
Years	Team	Apps	(Gls)
1992–1996	MTK	53	(3)
1996–2005	Újpest	231	(19)
2005–2006	Diósgyőr	0	(0)
2006–2007	Rákospalota	12	(0)
2007–2009	Felcsút	33	(0)
2009	Budapest Erőmű	10	(2)
2009–2011	Nagytétény	41	(8)
2011	Pilissport	14	(0)
2011–2013	Veresegyház	36	(4)
2014	Salgótarján	2	(0)
2015–2016	Bugyi	19	(1)
Total		451	(37)

International career
2004	Hungary B	1	(0)
- * Club domestic league appearances and goals

Zoltán Tamási (born 15 July 1972) is a Hungarian former professional footballer, who played as a defender.

== Career statistics ==
=== Club ===
Appearances and goals by club, season and competition
Club	Season	League			Magyar Kupa		Europe		Other		Total	
Club	Season	Division	Apps	Goals	Apps	Goals	Apps	Goals	Apps	Goals	Apps	Goals
MTK	1992–93	Nemzeti Bajnokság I	1	0	—		—		—		1	0
MTK	1993–94	Nemzeti Bajnokság I	11	0	3	0	1 (Note: Appearance(s) in UEFA Cup)	0	—		15	0
MTK	1994–95	Nemzeti Bajnokság II	22	3	5	0	—		—		27	3
MTK	1995–96	Nemzeti Bajnokság I	19	0	5	1	—		—		24	1
MTK	Total		53	3	13	1	1	0	—		67	4
Újpest	1996–97	Nemzeti Bajnokság I	30	1	6	0	—		—		36	1
Újpest	1997–98	Nemzeti Bajnokság I	16	0	4	0	—		—		20	0
Újpest	1998–99	Nemzeti Bajnokság I	25	1	3	1	5 (Note: Three appearances in UEFA Champions League, two appearances in UEFA Cup)	0	—		33	2
Újpest	1999–2000	Nemzeti Bajnokság I	24	3	2	0	2	0	—		28	3
Újpest	2000–01	Nemzeti Bajnokság I	29	2	5	1	—		—		34	3
Újpest	2001–02	Nemzeti Bajnokság I	34	4	6	0	—		—		40	4
Újpest	2002–03	Nemzeti Bajnokság I	28	6	1	0	4	0	1 (Note: Appearance in Szuperkupa)	0	34	6
Újpest	2003–04	Nemzeti Bajnokság I	28	1	1	0	—		—		29	1
Újpest	2004–05	Nemzeti Bajnokság I	17	1	1	0	3	0	—		21	1
Újpest	Total		231	19	29	2	14	0	1	0	275	21
Diósgyőr	2005–06	Nemzeti Bajnokság I	—		—		—		—		—	
Rákospalota	2005–06	Nemzeti Bajnokság I	4	0	—		—		—		4	0
Rákospalota	2006–07	Nemzeti Bajnokság I	8	0	3	0	—		—		11	0
Rákospalota	Total		12	0	3	0	—		—		15	0
Felcsút	2006–07	Nemzeti Bajnokság II	6	0	—		—		—		6	0
Felcsút	2007–08	Nemzeti Bajnokság II	26	0	2	0	—		—		28	0
Felcsút	2008–09	Nemzeti Bajnokság II	1	0	0	0	—		—		1	0
Felcsút	Total		33	0	2	0	—		—		35	0
Budapest Erőmű	2008–09	Megyei Bajnokság I	10	2	—		—		—		10	2
Nagytétény	2009–10	Megyei Bajnokság I	26	8	—		—		1 (Note: Appearance in Budapest Kupa)	1	27	9
Nagytétény	2010–11	Megyei Bajnokság I	15	0	—		—		1	0	16	0
Nagytétény	Total		41	8	—		—		2	1	43	9
Pilissport	2010–11	Megyei Bajnokság I	14	0	—		—		4 (Note: Appearance(s) in Pest Megyei Kupa)	2	18	2
Veresegyház	2011–12	Megyei Bajnokság I	25	3	—		—		—		25	3
Veresegyház	2012–13	Megyei Bajnokság I	11	1	—		—		1	0	12	1
Veresegyház	Total		36	4	—		—		1	0	37	4
Salgótarján	2013–14	Megyei Bajnokság I	2	0	—		—		1 (Note: Appearance in Magyar Kupa qualifying rounds)	0	3	0
Bugyi	2015–16	Megyei Bajnokság II	19	1	—		—		—		19	1
Career total			451	37	47	3	15	0	9	3	522	43

=== International ===
Appearances and goals by national team and year
Team	Year	Total	
Team	Year	Apps	Goals
Hungary B	2004	1	0
Career total		1	0

== Honours ==
MTK

- Nemzeti Bajnokság II – East: 1994–95

Újpest

- Nemzeti Bajnokság I: 1997–98
- Magyar Kupa: 2001–02; runner-up: 1997–98
- Szuperkupa: 2002

Veresegyház

- Megyei Bajnokság I – Pest: 2012–13

Salgótarján

- Megyei Bajnokság I – Nógrád: 2013–14
