= Gábor Hungler =

Hungarian footballer (born 1977)

Personal information
- Full name: Gábor József Hungler
- Date of birth: 11 February 1977 (age 49)
- Place of birth: Budapest, Hungary
- Height: 1.87 m (6 ft 2 in)
- Position: Right-back

Youth career
- –1994: Kispest-Honvéd

Senior career*
| Years | Team | Apps | (Gls) |
| 1994–2000 | Kispest-Honvéd | 62 | (1) |
| 1996 | → Győr (loan) | 7 | (0) |
| 1998 | → III. Kerület (loan) | 10 | (0) |
| 2000 | Siófok | 3 | (0) |
| 2000–2003 | Rákospalota | 56 | (4) |
| 2003–2004 | Honvéd | 10 | (0) |
| 2004 | Dabas | 11 | (0) |
| 2004–2011 | Vecsés | 113 | (19) |
| 2011–2012 | Rákosmente | 8 | (0) |
| 2012 | Kisnémedi | 13 | (2) |
| 2012–2014 | Vecsés | 38 | (4) |
| 2014–2015 | Kisnémedi | 28 | (4) |
| 2015–2016 | Cso-Ki Sport | 20 | (3) |
| 2016–2017 | Kisnémedi | 27 | (3) |
| 2016 | Kisnémedi II | 1 | (3) |
| 2017–2018 | Üllő | 27 | (1) |
| 2018–2024 | Szigethalom | 110 | (18) |
| Total | | 544 | (62) |

International career
| 1992 | Hungary U16 | 15 | (0) |
| 1993 | Hungary U17 | 6 | (0) |
| 1993–1994 | Hungary U18 | 8 | (1) |
| 1993–1994 | Hungary U19 | 3 | (0) |
| 1995–1996 | Hungary U21 | 4 | (0) |
| 1997 | Hungary U23 | 1 | (0) |
- * Club domestic league appearances and goals

Gábor József Hungler (born 11 February 1977) is a Hungarian former professional footballer who played as a right-back.

== Club career ==
Hungler is a youth product of Kispest-Honvéd. He made his debut in the Nemzeti Bajnokság I on 8 April 1995 in a 1–0 away loss against Soproni LC. He was later awarded the Ferenc Puskás Award, which is presented to young footballers for outstanding performance and exemplary conduct.

On 7 April 2009, it was announced that Hungler would undergo surgery for a cartilage injury in his left knee sustained against MTK II, ruling him out for at least four weeks.

On 8 August 2012, Hungler returned to Vecsés in the Nemzeti Bajnokság III.

== International career ==
Hungler represented the Hungary national under-16 team at the 1993 UEFA European Under-16 Championship.

== Career statistics ==
Appearances and goals by club, season and competition
| Club | Season | League | | | Magyar Kupa | | Europe | | Other | | Total | |
| Club | Season | Division | Apps | Goals | Apps | Goals | Apps | Goals | Apps | Goals | Apps | Goals |
|---|---|---|---|---|---|---|---|---|---|---|---|---|
| Kispest-Honvéd | 1994–95 | Nemzeti Bajnokság I | 2 | 0 | 2 | 0 | — | | — | | 4 | 0 |
| Kispest-Honvéd | 1995–96 | Nemzeti Bajnokság I | 2 | 0 | 2 | 0 | — | | — | | 4 | 0 |
| Kispest-Honvéd | 1996–97 | Nemzeti Bajnokság I | 13 | 0 | — | | 3 (Note: Appearances in UEFA Cup Winners' Cup) | 0 | — | | 16 | 0 |
| Kispest-Honvéd | 1997–98 | Nemzeti Bajnokság I | 11 | 0 | 1 | 0 | — | | — | | 12 | 0 |
| Kispest-Honvéd | 1998–99 | Nemzeti Bajnokság I | 23 | 0 | 3 | 0 | — | | — | | 26 | 0 |
| Kispest-Honvéd | 1999–2000 | Nemzeti Bajnokság I | 11 | 1 | 4 | 0 | — | | — | | 15 | 1 |
| Kispest-Honvéd | Total | | 62 | 1 | 12 | 0 | 3 | 0 | — | | 77 | 1 |
| Győr (loan) | 1995–96 | Nemzeti Bajnokság I | 7 | 0 | — | | — | | — | | 7 | 0 |
| III. Kerület (loan) | 1997–98 | Nemzeti Bajnokság II | 10 | 0 | — | | — | | — | | 10 | 0 |
| Siófok | 2000–01 | Nemzeti Bajnokság II | 3 | 0 | 2 | 0 | — | | — | | 5 | 0 |
| Rákospalota | 2000–01 | Nemzeti Bajnokság II | 13 | 0 | — | | — | | — | | 13 | 0 |
| Rákospalota | 2001–02 | Nemzeti Bajnokság II | 26 | 2 | 3 | 0 | — | | — | | 29 | 2 |
| Rákospalota | 2002–03 | Nemzeti Bajnokság II | 17 | 2 | 2 | 0 | — | | — | | 19 | 2 |
| Rákospalota | Total | | 56 | 4 | 5 | 0 | — | | — | | 61 | 4 |
| Honvéd | 2002–03 | Nemzeti Bajnokság I | 4 | 0 | — | | — | | — | | 4 | 0 |
| Honvéd | 2003–04 | Nemzeti Bajnokság II | 6 | 0 | 3 | 0 | — | | — | | 9 | 0 |
| Honvéd | Total | | 10 | 0 | 3 | 0 | — | | — | | 13 | 0 |
| Dabas | 2003–04 | Nemzeti Bajnokság II | 11 | 0 | — | | — | | — | | 11 | 0 |
| Vecsés | 2005–06 | Nemzeti Bajnokság II | 24 | 4 | 1 | 1 | — | | — | | 25 | 5 |
| Vecsés | 2006–07 | Nemzeti Bajnokság II | 25 | 6 | 1 | 1 | — | | — | | 26 | 7 |
| Vecsés | 2007–08 | Nemzeti Bajnokság II | 26 | 5 | | | — | | — | | 26 | 5 |
| Vecsés | 2008–09 | Nemzeti Bajnokság II | 17 | 4 | 2 | 1 | — | | — | | 19 | 5 |
| Vecsés | 2009–10 | Nemzeti Bajnokság II | 4 | 0 | — | | — | | — | | 4 | 0 |
| Vecsés | 2010–11 | Nemzeti Bajnokság II | 17 | 0 | 1 | 0 | — | | — | | 18 | 0 |
| Vecsés | Total | | 113 | 19 | 5 | 3 | — | | — | | 118 | 22 |
| Rákosmente | 2011–12 | Nemzeti Bajnokság III | 8 | 0 | 4 | 0 | — | | — | | 12 | 0 |
| Kisnémedi | 2011–12 | Megyei Bajnokság I | 13 | 2 | — | | — | | — | | 13 | 2 |
| Vecsés | 2012–13 | Nemzeti Bajnokság III | 19 | 1 | 2 | 1 | — | | — | | 21 | 2 |
| Vecsés | 2012–13 | Megyei Bajnokság I | 19 | 3 | — | | — | | — | | 19 | 3 |
| Vecsés | Total | | 38 | 4 | 2 | 1 | — | | — | | 40 | 5 |
| Kisnémedi | 2014–15 | Megyei Bajnokság II | 28 | 4 | — | | — | | 7 (Note: Appearances in Pest Megyei Kupa) | 0 | 35 | 4 |
| Cso-Ki Sport | 2015–16 | Megyei Bajnokság I | 20 | 3 | — | | — | | 2 (Note: One appearance in Magyar Kupa qualifying rounds, one appearance in Bajnokok Tornája) | — | 22 | 3 |
| Kisnémedi | 2016–17 | Megyei Bajnokság I | 27 | 3 | — | | — | | 2 (Note: One appearance in Magyar Kupa qualifying rounds, one appearance in Pest Megyei Kupa) | 0 | 29 | 3 |
| Kisnémedi II | 2016–17 | Megyei Bajnokság III | 1 | 3 | — | | — | | — | | 1 | 3 |
| Üllő | 2017–18 | Megyei Bajnokság II | 27 | 1 | — | | — | | 3 (Note: Appearances in Magyar Kupa qualifying rounds) | 0 | 30 | 1 |
| Szigethalom | 2018–19 | Megyei Bajnokság III | 22 | 10 | — | | — | | — | | 22 | 10 |
| Szigethalom | 2019–20 | Megyei Bajnokság III | 16 | 4 | — | | — | | — | | 16 | 4 |
| Szigethalom | 2020–21 | Megyei Bajnokság II | 25 | 2 | — | | — | | — | | 25 | 2 |
| Szigethalom | 2021–22 | Megyei Bajnokság II | 17 | 1 | — | | — | | — | | 17 | 1 |
| Szigethalom | 2022–23 | Megyei Bajnokság IV | 15 | 0 | — | | — | | — | | 15 | 0 |
| Szigethalom | 2023–24 | Megyei Bajnokság IV | 15 | 1 | — | | — | | — | | 15 | 1 |
| Szigethalom | Total | | 110 | 18 | — | | — | | — | | 110 | 18 |
| Career total | | | 544 | 62 | 33 | 4 | 3 | 0 | 14 | 0 | 594 | 66 |

== Honours ==
Honvéd

- Nemzeti Bajnokság II: 2003–04
- Magyar Kupa: 1995–96; runner-up: 2003–04

Kisnémedi

- Megyei Bajnokság II – Pest East group: 2014–15
