= Monye =

- Gender: Male
- Language: Igbo

Origin
- Origin: Nigerian
- Meaning: The spirit gave, or Someone believed to have been given by the ancestors.
- Region of origin: South East, Nigeria

Monye is a Nigerian surname and a male name of Igbo origin. It means "The spirit gave, or Someone believed to have been given by the ancestors." The name Monye is distinctive, carrying a traditional and spiritual undertone.

== Notable individuals with the name ==
- Jude Monye (born 1973), Nigerian sprinter
- Precious Monye (born 1974), Nigerian footballer
- Ugo Monye (born 1983), English rugby union player and sports commentator
