= Velibor =

Velibor (Serbian: Велибор) is a masculine given name of Slavic origin. It means "a tall pine tree". Notable people named Velibor include:

- Velibor Đurić (born 1982), Bosnian football player
- Velibor Jonić (died 1946), Serbian politician, government minister and fascist sympathiser in World War II
- Velibor Kopunović (born 1975), football player
- Velibor Milutinović (born 1944), Serbian-Mexican football coach and former player
- Velibor Pudar (born 1964), football manager and former goalkeeper
- Velibor Radović (born 1972), Montenegrin-Israeli professional basketball player
- Velibor Topić (born 1970), actor
- Velibor Vasilić (born 1980), Bosnian football player
- Velibor Vasović (1939–2002), Serbian football player
