= Goran Kopunović =

Serbian football manager and player

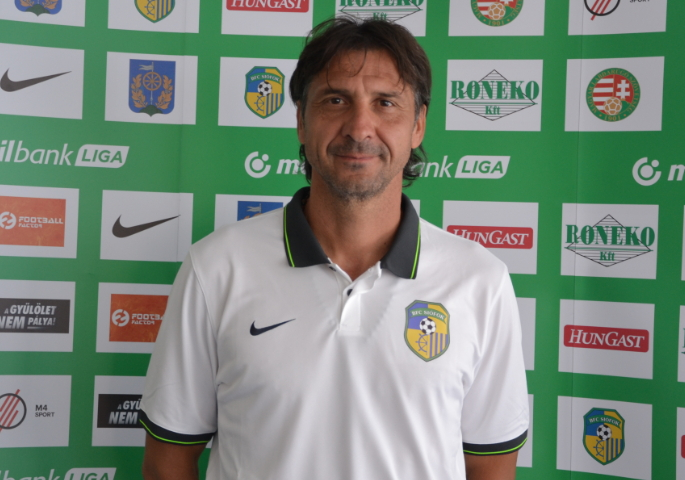
- Kopunović with Siófok in 2016

Personal information
- Full name: Goran Kopunović
- Date of birth: 1 February 1967 (age 59)
- Place of birth: Subotica, SR Serbia, SFR Yugoslavia
- Height: 1.84 m (6 ft 0 in)
- Position: Forward

Team information
- Current team: Csikszereda FC youth

Youth career
- Spartak Subotica

Senior career*
Years	Team	Apps	(Gls)
1986–1988	Bačka Subotica		
1988–1991	OFK Kikinda	66	(7)
1991–1992	Spartak Subotica	25	(5)
1992–1993	Figueres	7	(0)
1994–1996	Ferencváros	39	(9)
1996–1997	AEK Larnaca	15	(7)
1997–2000	Újpest	52	(8)
2000–2001	FSV Zwickau	25	(3)
2001–2002	TGM SV Jügesheim	25	(1)
Total		254	(40)

Managerial career
- 2010: Felsőpakony
- 2010–2013: Police
- 2014: Đồng Tâm Long An
- 2015: Simba
- 2015–2017: Siófok
- 2017–2018: Szeged 2011-Grosics Akadémia
- * Club domestic league appearances and goals

Goran Kopunović (Serbian Cyrillic: Горан Копуновић; born 1 February 1967) is a Serbian football manager and former professional football player.

== Playing career ==
Kopunović played for OFK Kikinda in the Yugoslav Second League between 1988 and 1991, before returning to his childhood club Spartak Subotica for the 1991–92 Yugoslav First League. He spent the next decade playing abroad in Spain (Figueres), Hungary (Ferencváros and Újpest), Cyprus (AEK Larnaca), and Germany (FSV Zwickau and TGM SV Jügesheim).

== Managerial career ==
After hanging up his boots, Kopunović worked as manager in Hungary, Rwanda, Vietnam, and Tanzania.

== Personal life ==
Kopunović is the older brother of fellow footballer Velibor Kopunović.

== Honours ==
Ferencváros

- Nemzeti Bajnokság I: 1994–95, 1995–96
- Magyar Kupa: 1994–95

Újpest

- Nemzeti Bajnokság I: 1997–98
