= Korsós =

Korsós is a Hungarian surname. Notable people with the surname include:

- Attila Korsós (born 1971), Hungarian footballer
- Dorina Korsós (born 1995), Hungarian handall player
- György Korsós (born 1976), Hungarian footballer
