= Zoran Kuntić =

Serbian football manager and player

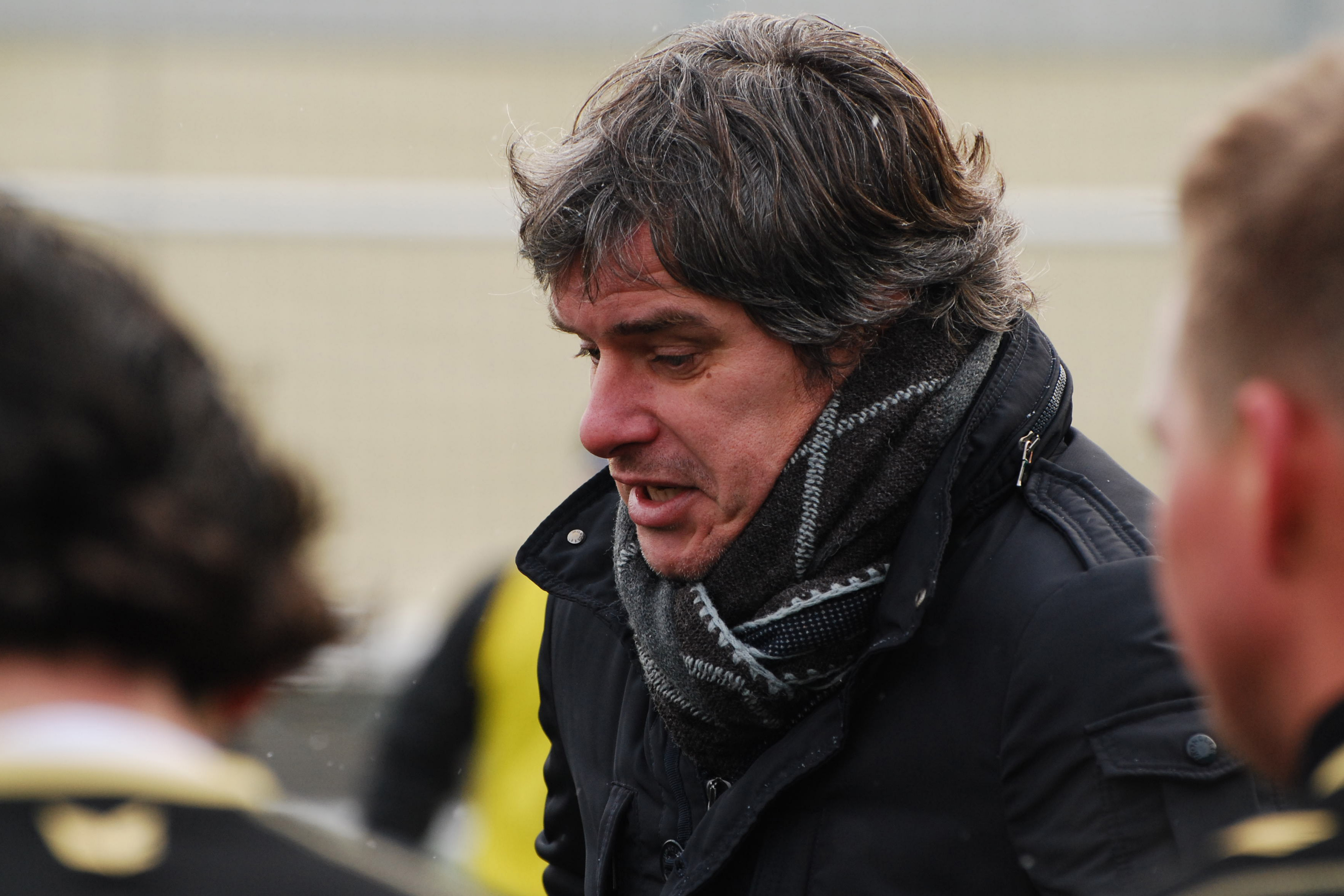
- Kuntić in 2013

Personal information
- Date of birth: 21 March 1967 (age 59)
- Place of birth: Subotica, SR Serbia, SFR Yugoslavia
- Height: 1.81 m (5 ft 11 in)
- Position: Forward

Senior career*
Years	Team	Apps	(Gls)
1984–1991	Spartak Subotica	94	(20)
1991–1993	Vojvodina	48	(11)
1993	→ Spartak Subotica (loan)	11	(3)
1993	POSCO Atoms	6	(1)
1994	Kecskemét		
1995	Parmalat	13	(11)
1995–1996	Ferencváros	27	(6)
1996–1997	AEK Larnaca	25	(2)
1997–1998	Vasas DH	25	(3)
1998	Videoton	16	(0)
1999–2000	BKV Előre	44	(3)
1999	→ Spartak Subotica (loan)	5	(1)
Total		314+	(61+)

Managerial career
- 2005: Diósgyőr
- 2006–2007: Lombard-Pápa
- 2007: Ferencváros
- 2009–2010: Dunakeszi
- 2012: Zvijezda Gradačac
- 2012–2013: Szigetszentmiklós
- 2014–2015: Ajka
- 2016–2017: SZEOL
- 2017–2018: Salgótarján
- 2018: Tiszafüred
- 2018–2019: Ózd
- * Club domestic league appearances and goals

Zoran Kuntić (Serbian Cyrillic: Зоран Кунтић; born 21 March 1967) is a Serbian football manager and former player.

== Playing career ==
Between 1984 and 1991, Kuntić played for Spartak Subotica, helping them win promotion to the Yugoslav First League on two occasions (1986 and 1988).

After a prolific stint with Parmalat, scoring 11 goals in 13 games in the second part of the 1994–95 season, Kuntić joined Hungarian champions Ferencváros. He netted the decisive goal in a 1–0 away victory against Anderlecht in the first leg of the 1995–96 UEFA Champions League qualifying round, helping the club reach the group stage of the competition for the first time ever. In his only season with the club, Kuntić also helped them defend the championship.

== Managerial career ==
After hanging up his boots, Kuntić was manager of numerous clubs in Hungary, most notably Diósgyőr, Lombard-Pápa, and Ferencváros.

== Career statistics ==
Appearances and goals by club, season and competition
Club	Season	League	
Club	Season	Apps	Goals
Spartak Subotica	1984–85	22	0
Spartak Subotica	1985–86	26	5
Spartak Subotica	1986–87	22	4
Spartak Subotica	1987–88		
Spartak Subotica	1988–89	0	0
Spartak Subotica	1989–90	0	0
Spartak Subotica	1990–91	24	11
Spartak Subotica	Total	94	20
Vojvodina	1991–92	31	7
Vojvodina	1992–93	17	4
Vojvodina	Total	48	11
Spartak Subotica	1992–93	11	3
POSCO Atoms	1993	6	1
Kecskemét	1993–94		
Kecskemét	1994–95		
Kecskemét	Total		
Parmalat	1994–95	13	11
Ferencváros	1995–96	27	6
AEK Larnaca	1996–97	25	2
Vasas DH	1997–98	25	3
Videoton	1998–99	16	0
BKV Előre	1998–99	13	0
BKV Előre	1999–2000	31	3
BKV Előre	Total	44	3
Spartak Subotica (loan)	1999–2000	5	1
Career total		289	59

== Honours ==
Ferencváros

- Nemzeti Bajnokság I: 1995–96
