= 1995–96 Nemzeti Bajnokság III =

Nemzeti Bajnokság III
- Season: 1996–97
- Champions: Kiskundorozsmai ESK (Alföld); Körmend (Bakony); DD Gáz (Dráva); Gázszer FC (Duna); Szolnoki MÁV SE (Mátra); Tiszafürdei IVSE (Tisza)
- Promoted: Kiskundorozsmai ESK (Alföld); DD Gáz (Dráva); Gázszer FC (Duna); Soroksári TE (Duna); Szolnoki MÁV SE (Mátra); Tiszafürdei IVSE (Tisza)

The 1995–96 Nemzeti Bajnokság III season was the 15th edition of the Nemzeti Bajnokság III.

== League tables ==
=== Alföld group ===
Pos	Team	Pld	W	D	L	GF	GA	GD	Pts	Promotion or relegation
1	Kiskundorozsmai Egyetértés SK	30	20	4	6	73	29	+44	64	Promoted to Nemzeti Bajnokság II
2	Kiskunfélegyházi TK	30	18	5	7	74	37	+37	59	
3	Makói FC	30	17	7	6	66	28	+38	58	
4	Kisszállás-Csont FC	30	18	4	8	65	37	+28	58	
5	Gyula-Kanton FC	30	17	5	8	53	37	+16	56	
6	Kalocsai FC	30	15	9	6	62	29	+33	54	
7	Kiskőrös FC	30	12	10	8	42	31	+11	46	
8	Bajai LSE	30	14	4	12	56	46	+10	46	
9	Szegedi VSE	30	13	3	14	58	54	+4	42	
10	Szegedi EAC	30	10	8	12	46	50	−4	38	
11	Tótkomlósi TC	30	11	5	14	35	53	−18	38	
12	Mezőberényi FC	30	9	4	17	38	54	−16	31	
13	Szarvasi FC	30	8	6	16	42	56	−14	30	
14	Kunbajai FC	30	8	5	17	39	62	−23	29	
15	Szentesi FC	30	4	8	18	29	77	−48	20	Relegation to Megyei Bajnokság I
16	Mindszenti FC	30	1	3	26	19	117	−98	6	Relegation to Megyei Bajnokság I

=== Bakony group ===
Pos	Team	Pld	W	D	L	GF	GA	GD	Pts	Relegation
1	Körmend Pumtex-Babati Hús FC	30	21	5	4	55	25	+30	68	
2	Csorna-Riegler SE	30	21	3	6	66	23	+43	66	
3	Linde SE Répcelak	30	16	9	5	56	36	+20	57	
4	Petőházi Cukorgyár SE	30	13	8	9	43	25	+18	47	
5	Büki TK-Győgyfürdő Rt.	30	14	5	11	40	41	−1	47	
6	Hévízi SK	30	12	8	10	54	51	+3	44	
7	Szentgotthárdi MSE	30	12	7	11	38	31	+7	43	
8	Motim TE	30	12	5	13	66	60	+6	41	
9	Tihanyi Petőfi SE	30	10	8	12	41	44	−3	38	
10	Tapolcai Bauxit Ifjúsági SE	30	10	7	13	32	41	−9	37	
11	Győri Dózsa-Horváth Gumi SE	30	11	3	16	59	51	+8	36	
12	Győr-Ménfőcsanak SE	30	10	5	15	35	58	−23	35	
13	Betka-MÁV DAC	30	10	4	16	29	38	−9	34	
14	Sárvári Kinizsi SE	30	8	6	16	35	57	−22	30	Relegation to Megyei Bajnokság I
15	Zalaapáti Royal-Speed SE	30	6	11	13	29	51	−22	29	Relegation to Megyei Bajnokság I
16	Szombathelyi Tanárképző-Raszter SE	30	4	4	22	31	77	−46	16	Relegation to Megyei Bajnokság I

=== Dráva group ===
Pos	Team	Pld	W	D	L	GF	GA	GD	Pts	Promotion or relegation
1	DD Gáz SC	30	22	6	2	75	13	+62	72	Promoted to Nemzeti Bajnokság II
2	Pécsi VSK	30	19	5	6	54	14	+40	62	
3	Beremend	30	17	8	5	47	19	+28	59	
4	UFC Szekszárd	30	14	9	7	54	33	+21	51	
5	Paks	30	13	10	7	54	46	+8	49	
6	Komlói Bányász SK	30	12	12	6	42	25	+17	48	
7	Marcali	30	13	7	10	50	43	+7	46	
8	Dunaszentgyörgy-Limex SE	30	11	7	12	40	38	+2	40	
9	Balatonlelle SE	30	11	6	13	45	43	+2	39	
10	Bátaszék	30	10	9	11	45	44	+1	39	
11	Pécsi Postás	30	9	7	14	35	41	−6	34	
12	Gerjen	30	7	10	13	38	47	−9	31	
13	Sellye	30	8	6	16	27	61	−34	30	
14	Bonyhád	30	5	8	17	26	70	−44	23	
15	Balatonföldvár	30	5	7	18	22	46	−24	22	Relegation to Megyei Bajnokság I
16	Balatonkeresztúr	30	3	5	22	28	99	−71	14	Relegation to Megyei Bajnokság I

=== Duna group ===
Pos	Team	Pld	W	D	L	GF	GA	GD	Pts	Promotion or relegation
1	Gázszer FC (Agárd)	30	21	7	2	91	29	+62	70	Promoted to Nemzeti Bajnokság II
2	Elektromos SE	30	20	4	6	60	26	+34	64	
3	Csákvár FC	30	19	4	7	59	35	+24	61	
4	Dorogi SE	30	17	4	9	50	27	+23	55	
5	Soroksári TE	30	14	7	9	56	35	+21	49	Promoted to Nemzeti Bajnokság II
6	Erzsébeti SMTK	30	14	5	11	53	44	+9	47	
7	(Honvéd Szondi) Velence SE	30	14	2	14	43	64	−21	44	
8	Szigetszentmiklósi TK	30	11	9	10	55	50	+5	42	
9	Pénzügyőr SE	30	11	6	13	51	45	+6	39	
10	Dömsödi SE	30	12	3	15	44	51	−7	39	
11	Komáromi FC	30	9	8	13	43	42	+1	35	
12	Bicskei TC	30	7	11	12	36	54	−18	32	
13	Kistarcsai Synergy SC	30	9	5	16	40	65	−25	32	
14	LRI-MALÉV SC	30	8	5	17	37	59	−22	29	
15	Pilisvörösvári SC	30	9	6	15	36	46	−10	27 (Note: 6 points deducted)	
16	Bakonycsernyei Bányász SE	30	0	4	26	8	90	−82	4	Relegation to Megyei Bajnokság I

=== Mátra group ===
Pos	Team	Pld	W	D	L	GF	GA	GD	Pts	Promotion
1	Szolnoki MÁV SE	30	22	7	1	51	7	+44	73	Promoted to Nemzeti Bajnokság II
2	Rákospalotai EAC	30	21	7	2	66	17	+49	70	
3	Jászberényi SE-Vasas	30	15	8	7	54	23	+31	53	
4	Füzesabonyi SC	30	16	4	10	55	33	+22	52	
5	Karcag-Joma SE	30	13	9	8	44	30	+14	48	
6	Dunakeszi VSE	30	13	7	10	52	34	+18	46	
7	Monor-Ecker SE	30	13	6	11	48	39	+9	45	
8	Selypi Kinizsi SK	30	14	3	13	30	31	−1	45	
9	Szécsényi VSE	30	12	6	12	28	40	−12	42	
10	Gyöngyösi AK	30	11	7	12	41	49	−8	40	
11	Multi-Rocco FC	30	10	5	15	46	47	−1	35	
12	Újszászi SE	30	10	4	16	35	44	−9	34	
13	Pásztó-Hasznos FC	30	8	9	13	29	51	−22	33	
14	Ceglédi Kossuth Honvéd SE	30	7	2	21	39	60	−21	23	
15	Salgó Öblös Faipari SC	30	6	7	17	22	58	−36	22 (Note: 3 points deducted, substituted by Hasznos SE during the season)	
16	Recski Ércbányász SE	30	2	3	25	19	96	−77	0 (Note: 9 points deducted)	

=== Tisza group ===
Pos	Team	Pld	W	D	L	GF	GA	GD	Pts	Promotion or relegation
1	Tiszafüred Ivecosped VSE	30	22	3	5	60	17	+43	69	Promoted to Nemzeti Bajnokság II
2	Tiszaújvárosi SE	30	20	6	4	73	27	+46	66	
3	Nagykálló SE	30	17	7	6	57	36	+21	58	
4	Rakamazi Spartacus SE	30	16	7	7	61	25	+36	55	
5	Kisvárda SE	30	13	8	9	47	41	+6	47	
6	Balmazújvárosi SC	30	11	8	11	50	40	+10	41	
7	Baktalórántházi SE	30	12	5	13	56	53	+3	41	
8	Szikszói VFC	30	10	11	9	36	37	−1	41	
9	Ózdi FC	30	12	3	15	42	39	+3	39	
10	Mád KSE	30	11	6	13	38	40	−2	39	
11	Nyírbátor FC	30	11	5	14	41	64	−23	38	
12	Miskolci VSC	30	10	7	13	29	42	−13	37	
13	Borsodi Építők Volán SC	30	9	9	12	34	43	−9	36	
14	Mátészalkai MTK	30	10	4	16	41	57	−16	34	Relegation to Megyei Bajnokság I
15	Hajdúböszörményi TE	30	5	2	23	36	62	−26	17	Relegation to Megyei Bajnokság I
16	Vámospércsi Bocskai SE	30	4	3	23	21	99	−78	15	Relegation to Megyei Bajnokság I

== See also ==
- 1995–96 Magyar Kupa
- 1995–96 Nemzeti Bajnokság I
- 1995–96 Nemzeti Bajnokság II
