= Oleg Korol =

Belarusian footballer and coach

Personal information
- Full name: Oleg Ivanovich Korol
- Date of birth: 7 November 1969 (age 56)
- Place of birth: Brest, Belarusian SSR
- Height: 1.91 m (6 ft 3 in)
- Position: Defender

Youth career
- 1985–1989: Dynamo Brest

Senior career*
Years	Team	Apps	(Gls)
1990–1994	Dinamo Brest	127	(10)
1995	Iraklis Thessaloniki	5	(0)
1995–1996	Dinamo Brest	29	(3)
1997	Ferencváros	7	(0)
1997	Stadler	30	(0)
1998–1999	Gázszer	47	(2)
2000	DAC Dunajská Streda	13	(1)
2000	BATE Borisov	19	(2)
2001	Dinamo Brest	18	(2)
2003–2005	Bereza	90	(0)

International career
1996	Belarus	2	(0)

Managerial career
- 2006–2009: Dinamo Brest (assistant)
- 2014–2017: Granit Mikashevichi (assistant)
- 2017–2019: Slonim-2017
- 2019: Volna Pinsk
- 2020: Granit Mikashevichi
- 2021–2022: Baranovichi
- * Club domestic league appearances and goals

Oleg Ivanovich Korol (Belarusian: Алег Іванавіч Кароль, Russian: Олег Иванович Король; born 7 November 1969) is a Belarusian professional football coach and former player.
