= 1991–92 Magyar Kupa =

Tournament details
- Country: Hungary

Final positions
- Champions: Újpest
- Runners-up: Vác

The 1991–92 Magyar Kupa (English: Hungarian Cup) was the 52nd season of Hungary's annual knock-out cup football competition.

== Quarter-finals ==
Team 1	Agg.	Team 2	1st leg	2nd leg
Győri ETO	1–3	Kispest Honvéd	0–1	1–2
MTK Budapest	6–2	Siófoki Bányász	3–1	3–1
Nagykanizsa	1–3	Vác	0–1	1–2
Bagi	0–5	Újpest	0–0	0–5

== Semi-finals ==
Team 1	Agg.	Team 2	1st leg	2nd leg
Vác	3–1	MTK Budapest	0–0	3–1
Kispest Honvéd	2–3	Újpest	2–3	0–0

== Final ==
20 May 1992
17:00 (UTC+2)

Újpest	1–0 (a.e.t.)	Vác
Eszenyi 117'	Report

Kórház utcai Stadion, Békéscsaba
Attendance: 10,000
Referee: Lajos Németh (Hungary)

== See also ==
- 1991–92 Nemzeti Bajnokság I
