= Attila Piroska =

Romanian footballer

Personal information
- Date of birth: 11 April 1972 (age 54)
- Place of birth: Cluj-Napoca, Romania
- Height: 1.74 m (5 ft 9 in)
- Position: Attacking midfielder

Senior career*
Years	Team	Apps	(Gls)
1992–1994	CFR Cluj		
1994–1995	FC Maramureș Baia Mare	25	(4)
1995–1996	Kispesti Honvéd	34	(5)
1997–1999	FC Baia Mare	41	(7)
1999–2001	Kispesti Honvéd	67	(7)
2002	Újpest	12	(1)
2002–2003	Kispesti Honvéd	15	(6)
2003	FC Baia Mare	6	(0)
2003–2004	Diósgyőri	1	(0)
Total		201	(30)
- * Club domestic league appearances and goals

Attila Piroska (born 11 April 1972) is a retired Romanian football midfielder.

== Honours ==
Kispesti Honvéd

- Magyar Kupa: 1995–96

Újpest

- Magyar Kupa: 2001–02
