= Csaba Fehér =

Hungarian footballer

Personal information
- Full name: Csaba Fehér
- Date of birth: 2 September 1975 (age 51)
- Place of birth: Szekszárd, Hungary
- Height: 1.80 m (5 ft 11 in)
- Positions: Right back; defensive midfielder

Youth career
- Szekszárdi UFC
- –1992: Pécsi Mecsek

Senior career*
Years	Team	Apps	(Gls)
1992–1996	Pécsi Mecsek	64	(5)
1996–1999	Újpest	82	(4)
1999–2000	MTK	14	(3)
2000	Verbroedering Geel	14	(0)
2000–2004	NAC Breda	118	(15)
2004–2007	PSV	7	(0)
2005	→ Újpest (loan)	14	(1)
2005–2006	→ Willem II (loan)	20	(1)
2007–2011	NAC Breda	85	(5)
2011	Újpest	1	(0)

International career^{‡}
1996–1997	Hungary U-21	4	(0)
1998–2009	Hungary	42	(0)
- * Club domestic league appearances and goals as of 14 August 2011 ‡ National team caps and goals as of 12 August 2009

Csaba Fehér (born 2 September 1975 in Szekszárd) is a former professional Hungarian footballer. He was a defender who could also operate in midfield.

== Football career ==
Fehér started playing professionally with Hungarian sides Pécsi MFC, Újpesti TE and MTK Hungária FC. In January 2000, he moved to Belgium, representing lowly Verbroedering Geel.

From 2000 to 2004, Fehér played with NAC Breda in the Netherlands, eventually catching the eye of Eredivisie giants PSV Eindhoven. However, his time there would not be a successful one, as he was consecutively loaned, to old team Újpest and Willem II.

After spending 2007–08 again on loan, this time to NAC Breda, Fehér made the move permanent for the following season.

In June 2011, he returned to his Újpest FC.

== Honours ==
Újpest FC

- Hungarian League: 1997–98
  - Runner-up 1996–97
- Hungarian Cup: Runner-up 1997–98

PSV Eindhoven

- Dutch League: 2006–07
- Dutch Supercup: Runner-up 2006
