= Csaba László (footballer, born 1967) =

Hungarian footballer

Personal information
- Full name: Csaba László
- Date of birth: 18 August 1967 (age 59)
- Place of birth: Várpalota, Hungary
- Height: 1.85 m (6 ft 1 in)
- Position: Defender

Team information
- Current team: BVSC Budapest

Senior career*
Years	Team	Apps	(Gls)
1987–1996	FC Fehérvár	150	(2)
1996–1997	Gázszer FC	20	(3)
1997–1999	BVSC Budapest	42	(1)
1999	FC Fehérvár	3	(0)
- * Club domestic league appearances and goals

Csaba László (born 18 August 1967 in Várpalota) is a Hungarian football player who played for BVSC Budapest.
