= Ferenc Szilveszter =

Hungarian footballer

Personal information
- Date of birth: 26 November 1971 (age 54)
- Place of birth: Szekszárd, Hungary
- Height: 1.74 m (5 ft 9 in)
- Position: Midfielder

Youth career
- Szekszárdi UFC

Senior career*
Years	Team	Apps	(Gls)
1989–1994	Vasas SC	45	(0)
1994–1995	BKV Előre SC	?	(?)
1995–2000	Vasas SC	147	(27)
2000–2001	MTK Budapest FC	11	(0)
2001–2002	BKV Előre SC	?	(?)
2002–2003	Békéscsabai Előre FC	22	(1)

International career
1998	Hungary	4	(0)
- * Club domestic league appearances and goals

Ferenc Szilveszter (born 26 November 1971) is a former Hungarian footballer who played as a midfielder for several clubs in Hungary.

== Club career ==
Szilveszter began his professional career with Vasas SC and went on to play for MTK Budapest FC and Békéscsabai Előre FC.

== International career ==
Szilveszter made four appearances for the senior Hungary national football team. He made his debut in a friendly against Iran on 20 April 1998.
