= Vilmos Sebők =

Hungarian footballer

Personal information
- Date of birth: 13 June 1973 (age 53)
- Place of birth: Budapest, Hungary
- Height: 1.90 m (6 ft 3 in)
- Position: Centre-back

Youth career
- 1982–1986: Ferencvárosi TC
- 1987–1990: Szent István SZKI

Senior career*
Years	Team	Apps	(Gls)
1990–1991	Újpest	0	(0)
1991–1993	FC Tatabánya	19	(1)
1993–1994	REAC	11	(0)
1994–1995	FC Tatabánya	23	(3)
1995–1998	Újpest	95	(10)
1999	Bristol City	23	(0)
2000	Waldhof Mannheim	15	(1)
2000–2003	Energie Cottbus	45	(3)
2003	Maccabi Ahi Nazareth	16	(1)
2004–2007	Zalaegerszegi TE	87	(20)
2007–2008	Diósgyőr	23	(2)
2009	Ladánybene FC	3	(0)
Total		360	(41)

International career
1996–2006	Hungary	52	(9)
1996	Hungarian Olympic Team	12	(0)
- * Club domestic league appearances and goals

Vilmos Sebők (born 13 June 1973) is a Hungarian former professional footballer who played as a centre-back.

He made his debut for the Hungary national team in 1996, and has got 52 caps and 9 goals. He was a participant at the 1996 Summer Olympics in Atlanta, where Hungary failed to progress from the group stage.

His most remembered moment in club football was when he played for FC Energie Cottbus in the Bundesliga, because there he scored the goal for Cottbus when they beat Bayern Munich 1–0 at Cottbus.

Sebők guided Újpest FC to the 1998 Hungarian League title before moving to Bristol City F.C. in 1999.

== Honours ==
Újpest

- Hungarian League: 1998, runner-up 1997
- Hungarian Cup: runner-up 1998
