= Mohamed Tawal Camara =

Guinean footballer

Personal information
- Date of birth: 23 May 1976 (age 50)
- Place of birth: Conakry, Guinea
- Position: Defender

Senior career*
Years	Team	Apps	(Gls)
1997	Újpest	1	(0)

International career
1996	Guinea	3	(0)
- * Club domestic league appearances and goals

Mohamed Tawal Camara (born 23 May 1976) is a Guinean former footballer who played in Hungary for Újpest. He was capped three times by Guinea in 1996.

== Career statistics ==
=== Club ===
Club	Season	League		Cup		Other		Total	
Club	Season	Apps	Goals	Apps	Goals	Apps	Goals	Apps	Goals
Újpest	1996–97	1	0	0	0	0	0	1	0
Újpest	1997–98	0	0	0	0	1 (Note: Appearances in the UEFA Cup)	0	1	0
Career total		1	0	0	0	1	0	2	0

=== International ===
Appearances and goals by national team and year
National team	Year	Apps	Goals
Guinea	1996	3	0
Total		3	0
