= Velibor Kopunović =

Serbian-Croatian footballer and manager

Personal information
- Date of birth: 25 November 1975 (age 50)
- Place of birth: Subotica, SR Serbia, SFR Yugoslavia
- Height: 1.83 m (6 ft 0 in)
- Position: Forward

Team information
- Current team: Ohod Club (U17 Head Coach)

Senior career*
Years	Team	Apps	(Gls)
1995–1996	Spartak Subotica		
1996	VB Vágur	17	(9)
1997–1998	Čukarički Stankom	13	(1)
1998–1999	Vác FC-Zollner	15	(0)
1999–2000	Dynamo Dresden	25	(1)
2000–2001	Hallescher FC	30	(13)
2001–2003	Sachsen Leipzig	24	(10)
2003	Kapfenberger SV	16	(2)
2005	Tampere United	14	(2)
2006	Chongqing Lifan	13	(4)
2006	Qingdao Zhongneng	8	(0)
2007	Újpest	5	(0)
2007–2008	Zlatibor Voda	16	(9)
2008–2009	Spartak Subotica	11	(0)
2009	Pyrsos Grevena		
2010	Anagennisi Epanomi		

Managerial career
- 2013-2015: BASK (U19)
- 2015-2016: Red Star Belgrade (U15)
- 2016-2018: Red Star Belgrade (U17)
- 2018-2019: Balzan (assistant coach)
- 2019: Smederevo (asst.)
- 2019: OFK Beograd
- 2020: Stepojevac Vaga
- 2021: Ohod Club (U17)
- * Club domestic league appearances and goals

Velibor Kopunović (Serbian Cyrillic: Велибор Копуновић; born 25 November 1975) is a Serbian-Croatian football manager and former player who played as a forward.

During his journeyman career, Kopunović represented numerous clubs from several countries, namely, Serbia (Spartak Subotica, Čukarički Stankom and Zlatibor Voda), the Faroe Islands (VB Vágur), Hungary (Vác FC-Zollner and Újpest), Germany (Dynamo Dresden, Hallescher FC and Sachsen Leipzig), Austria (Kapfenberger SV), Finland (Tampere United), China (Chongqing Lifan and Qingdao Zhongneng) and Greece (Pyrsos Grevena and Anagennisi Epanomi).

After retiring, he started his coaching career. He took charge of FK Stepojevac Vaga of Serbian League Belgrade in 2019–20 season.

He is the younger brother of fellow former footballer Goran Kopunović.
