= Ferenc Babati =

Hungarian footballer

Personal information
- Date of birth: 6 June 1972 (age 54)
- Place of birth: Zalaegerszeg, Hungary
- Height: 1.74 m (5 ft 8 1/2 in)
- Position: Midfielder

Youth career
- Zalaegerszegi TE
- Paksi SE

Senior career*
Years	Team	Apps	(Gls)
1996–1998	Újpest FC	44	(3)
1998–2005	Zalaegerszegi TE	164	(2)
2001	→ Hévíz FC (loan)	?	(?)
2002	→ Hévíz FC (loan)	?	(?)
2005–2006	Szombathelyi Haladás	19	(4)
Total		227	(9)
- * Club domestic league appearances and goals

Ferenc Babati (born 6 June 1972 in Zalaegerszeg) is a retired Hungarian football (midfielder) player who has spent most of his career playing for Zalaegerszegi TE.
