= Precious Monye =

Nigerian footballer

Personal information
- Full name: Precious Monye Onyabor
- Date of birth: December 22, 1974 (age 51)
- Place of birth: Nigeria
- Positions: Defender; midfielder

Senior career*
Years	Team	Apps	(Gls)
- Enyimba International
1992–1993	Udoji United		
1993–1994	Stationery Stores		
1994–1995	Sharks		
1995–1998	Reggiana 1919		
1995–1996	→ Videoton (loan)	23	(1)
1997	→ Cosenza Calcio (loan)	2	(0)
1997	→ Videoton (loan)	10	(2)
1997–1998	→ Újpest (loan)	17	(1)
2000–2001	FC UTA Arad		
2001–2003	Videoton	30	(1)
2004–2007	Birkirkara	74	(3)
2007–2008	Ħamrun Spartans	22	(0)
- Sannat Lions

International career
- Nigeria U17
- Nigeria U20
- Nigeria U23
1992–1994	Nigeria	7	(0)
Medal record
Men's football
Representing Nigeria
All-Africa Games
Bronze medal – third place	1991 Cairo	Team competition
- * Club domestic league appearances and goals

Precious Monye Onyabor (born 22 December 1974) is a Nigerian retired footballer.

== Career ==
Monye signed with Italian side Reggiana 1919, and was loaned out to second division side Cosenza Calcio and Hungarian side Videoton, where he became the club's first ever black player. He was also loaned to Újpest FC, winning a league title with them in 1997–98. He returned to Nigeria to get treatment for an injury before joining UTA Arad in Romania for a season. He then returned to Hungary in 2002 to rejoin Videoton.

From there, he signed for Maltese team Birkirkara in January 2004, where he spent four seasons. He switched to Ħamrun Spartans in 2007, where he played for another year.

== International career ==
At the youth level, he played in the 1989 FIFA U-16 World Championship in Scotland and the 1991 All-Africa Games, where he won a bronze medal with the national under-23 team.

His senior international debut came against Sudan on 16 August 1992 during the 1994 African Cup of Nations qualification. He also played in the 1994 FIFA World Cup qualification.
