= Balázs Kiskapusi =

Hungarian footballer (born 1979)

Personal information
- Date of birth: 12 November 1975 (age 50)
- Place of birth: Hungary
- Position: Defender

Senior career*
Years	Team	Apps	(Gls)
1995–1996	Kecskeméti TE		
1996–199x	Egri FC		
199x–2000	Újpest FC	83	(2)
2000–2002	Fehérvár FC	24	(2)
2002–2003	Nyíregyháza Spartacus FC		
2003–2004	Akademisk Boldklub	11	(3)
2004–2005	Næstved BK		
2005–2006	Nyíregyháza Spartacus FC	18	(0)
2006–2007	Jászapáti VSE	37	(0)
2007–2010	Vecsési FC	74	(3)
2010–2011	Egri FC	28	(1)
2011–2015	Jászapáti VSE	97	(5)
2015–20xx	Csömör KSK		
- * Club domestic league appearances and goals

Balázs Kiskapusi (born 12 November 1975) is a Hungarian former footballer.

== Career ==
Kiskapusi started his senior career with Kecskeméti TE in 1995, after which he also played for Újpest FC and Fehérvár FC. In 2003, he signed for Akademisk Boldklub in the Danish Superliga, where he made eleven league appearances and scored three goals. After that, he played for Danish club Næstved BK and Hungarian clubs Nyíregyháza Spartacus, Jászapáti VSE, Vecsési, Egri, and Csömör KSK before retiring.
