= János Árgyelán =

Hungarian footballer

Personal information
- Date of birth: 26 January 1969 (age 57)
- Place of birth: Gyula
- Position: Midfielder

Senior career*
Years	Team	Apps	(Gls)
1990–1994	Békéscsabai Előre		
1994	Győri ETO FC		
1995	Matáv Sopron		
1996	Kispesti Honvéd FC		
1996	Videoton FC		
1997	Újpest FC		
1998	Békéscsabai Előre		
- * Club domestic league appearances and goals

János Árgyelán (born 26 January 1969) is a retired Hungarian football midfielder.
