= Ferenc Hámori =

Hungarian footballer (born 1972)

Personal information
- Date of birth: 14 October 1972 (age 54)
- Place of birth: Budapest, Hungary
- Position: Forward

Senior career*
| Years | Team | Apps | (Gls) |
| 1990–1994 | MTK Budapest | 90 | (16) |
| 1994–1997 | Győri ETO FC | 58 | (9) |
| 1995–1996 | → Marítimo (loan) | 4 | (0) |
| 1997–1999 | Vasas SC | 58 | (27) |
| 1999–2000 | Maccabi Netanya | 16 | (0) |
| 2000–2002 | Ferencváros | 1 | (0) |
| 2002–2003 | Vasas SC | 17 | (3) |

International career
| 1991–1998 | Hungary | 9 | (1) |
- * Club domestic league appearances and goals

Ferenc Hámori (born 14 October 1972) is a Hungarian former professional footballer who played as a forward.

== Honours ==
Ferencváros

- Nemzeti Bajnokság I: 2000–01
