= Miklós Herczeg =

Hungarian footballer

Personal information
- Full name: Miklós Herczeg
- Date of birth: March 26, 1974 (age 52)
- Place of birth: Hungary
- Position: Forward

Senior career*
Years	Team	Apps	(Gls)
1990–1995	Győri ETO		
1995–1996	Soproni		
1995–1999	Újpest		
1999–2000	Győri ETO		
2000–2002	Újpest		
2002–2003	Győri ETO		
2004	DAC Dunajská Streda		
2004–2005	Budapest Honvéd		
2005–2006	Lombard-Pápa		
2006–2007	Integrál-DAC		
2008–2009	Ebergassing		
2009–2010	TJ Družstevník Okoč – Sokolec		

International career
1996	Hungary Olympic		

Managerial career
- Győri ETO
- * Club domestic league appearances and goals

Miklós Herczeg (born 26 March 1974) is a Hungarian football player.

He was in the Hungary national team at the 1996 Summer Olympics in Atlanta, where Hungary failed to progress from the group stage. He played as an attacker.

== Clubs ==
- 1990–1995 : (Hungary) ETO Győr
- 1995–1996 : (Hungary) Soproni
- 1995–1999 : (Hungary) Újpest
- 1999–2000 : (Hungary) ETO Győr
- 2000–2002 : (Hungary) Újpest
- 2002–2003 : (Hungary) ETO Győr
- 2004 : (Slovakia) DAC Dunajská Streda
- 2004–2005 : (Hungary) Honvéd Budapest
- 2005–2006 : (Hungary) Lombard-Pápa
- 2006–2007 : (Hungary) Integrál-DAC
- 2008–2009 : (Austria) Ebergassing
- 2009–2010 : (Slovakia) TJ Družstevník Okoč – Sokolec
