= Zoltán Szlezák =

Hungarian footballer

Zoltán Szlezák (born 26 December 1967 in Balassagyarmat, Hungary) is a retired Hungarian football player who has spent most of his career playing for Újpest FC.He played as a centre back. He was considered a fan's favourite in Újpest. He played 9 matches between 1994 and 1997 for the Hungary national team.

== Honours ==
=== Club ===
Újpest FC

- Hungarian League: 1990, 1998
  - Runner-up: 1995, 1997
- Hungarian Cup: 1992, 2002
  - Runner-up 1998
