= Flórián Urbán =

Hungarian footballer and manager

Personal information
- Full name: Flórián Urbán
- Date of birth: 29 July 1968 (age 58)
- Place of birth: Budapest, Hungary
- Height: 1.85 m (6 ft 1 in)
- Positions: Centre-back; defensive midfielder

Youth career
- Duna Cipő
- Újpesti Dózsa

Senior career*
Years	Team	Apps	(Gls)
1990–1991	Volán	27	(2)
1991–1992	Győri ETO	26	(6)
1992–1993	Waregem	42	(9)
1994–1995	Mechelen	39	(14)
1995	Újpest	9	(0)
1996	Waregem	13	(4)
1996	Győri ETO	14	(6)
1997	Germinal Ekeren	28	(1)
1997	Anderlecht	2	(0)
1998–1999	Eendracht Aalst	30	(3)
1999	Újpest	15	(2)
1999	Szeged LC	11	(0)
1999	→ Spartak Subotica (loan)	2	(0)
2000	Dunakeszi VSE	10	(2)
2000–2001	Újpest	34	(15)
2001–2003	Zalaegerszeg	56	(4)
2003–2004	Újpest	4	(0)
Total		360	(68)

International career
1991–2003	Hungary	40	(4)

Managerial career
- 2004–2006: REAC
- 2007: FC Felcsút
- 2008: Lombard-Pápa TFC
- 2012: Vasas SC
- * Club domestic league appearances and goals

Flórián Urbán (born 29 July 1968) is a Hungarian football manager and former player. He played primarily as a centre back.

== Career ==
He represented several Hungarian clubs during his career, such as Volán FC, Győri ETO FC, Újpest FC, Szegedi LC, Dunakeszi VSE and Zalaegerszegi TE. During the 1990s he spent most of his career in Belgium playing with K.S.V. Waregem, Mechelen, Germinal Ekeren, RSC Anderlecht and Eendracht Aalst. In late 1999, he had a spell with FK Spartak Subotica in the First League of FR Yugoslavia. He played mostly as defensive midfielder, sweeper or central defender.

== National team ==
Urban made his debut for the Hungary national team in 1991, and got 40 caps and 4 goals until 2003.

=== International goals ===
#	Date	Venue	Opponent	Score	Result	Competition
1.	10 November 1996	Tofiq Bahramov Stadium, Baku, Azerbaijan	Azerbaijan	3–0	3–0	1998 WCQ

== Coaching career ==
After retiring Urbán begin his coaching career in 2004. He has been the manager of REAC, FC Felcsút, Lombard-Pápa TFC and Vasas SC. In 2007, he participated in the reality show Lúzer FC, in which he was the coach of the titular team, consisting of people who very much can't play football.

== Honours ==
Germinal Ekeren

- Belgian Cup: 1996–97

Zalaegerszeg

- Nemzeti Bajnokság I: 2001–02
