= Attila Korsós =

Hungarian footballer (born 1971)

Personal information
- Full name: Attila Korsós
- Date of birth: 25 December 1971 (age 54)
- Place of birth: Győr, Hungary
- Height: 1.82 m (6 ft 0 in)
- Position: Left midfielder

Youth career
- 19??–1990: Győri ETO FC

Senior career*
Years	Team	Apps	(Gls)
1990–1992	Győri ETO FC	5	(0)
1992–1996	Soproni LC		
1996–1998	FC Fehérvár	59	(14)
1998–1999	Újpest FC	43	(17)
1999–2000	SV Austria Salzburg	17	(3)
2000–2001	Újpest FC	9	(3)
2001	FC Fehérvár	16	(4)
2001–2002	SV Austria Salzburg	12	(2)
2002–2003	FC Fehérvár	18	(5)
2003–2006	Gyirmót		
2006–2007	Integrál-DAC	14	(8)

International career
1998–2001	Hungary	11	(3)
- * Club domestic league appearances and goals

Attila Korsós (born 25 December 1971 in Győr) is a Hungarian former football player.

== World Cup 2002 Qualifier ==
From 2000 to 2001, Attila Korsós participated in four World Cup qualifying matches for Hungary.

== Career in NBII ==
In 2003, he left FC Fehérvár (which was playing in the NB1) and went to Gyirmot SE (a football team playing in the Hungarian second division). In the season 2005/06 he managed to score 20 goals in 27 matches with Gyirmót SE in NB II.

== Career honours ==
- Hungarian League: 1998

== Personal life ==
His father, István Korsós, was also a footballer.
