= 1991–92 Nemzeti Bajnokság I =

Nemzeti Bajnokság I
- Season: 1991–92
- Champions: Ferencváros
- Relegated: Haladás; Tatabányai Bányász; Zalaegerszeg
- Champions League: Ferencváros
- UEFA Cup: Vác
- Cup Winners' Cup: Újpest
- Matches: 240
- Goals: 600 (2.5 per match)
- Top goalscorer: Pál Fischer; Ferenc Orosz (16)

Statistics of Nemzeti Bajnokság I in the 1991–92 season.

== Overview ==
It was contested by 16 teams, and Ferencvárosi TC won their 24th national championship, and first under headcoach and player-legend Tibor Nyilasi.

Ferencváros were in a 3-way title-race with defending champions Honvéd and Vác for much of the season. By the time of the winterbreak Vác were leading the table 2 points above Honvéd and 3 points above FTC. On the first matchday of the spring part of the season, Ferencváros defeated Vác 3-1, with Péter Deszatnik scoring a brace within 3 minutes.

Vác would also go on to lose their following leaguegame against Siófok, allowing Ferencváros to take a massive leap towards the trophy. Despite Vác winning all but one of their remaining games from Round 18 onwards, their superb winning streak was not enough to surpass FTC's point-tally, who won 13 of their last 15 fixtures. The fate of the trophy was decided on the last day of the season, with Ferencváros leading the table one point over Vác prior to the matchweek. Ferencváros defeated DVTK 2–0 in Miskolc in front of 30,000 spectators, while Vác also won their fixture against Veszprém.

== League standings ==
Pos	Team	Pld	W	D	L	GF	GA	GD	Pts	Qualification or relegation
1	Ferencváros (C)	30	18	10	2	61	19	+42	46	Qualification for Champions League first round
2	Vác	30	19	7	4	54	27	+27	45	Qualification for UEFA Cup first round
3	Kispest Honvéd	30	19	4	7	61	27	+34	42	
4	Siófoki Bányász	30	15	6	9	46	34	+12	36	
5	MTK Hungária	30	14	7	9	44	34	+10	35	
6	Vasas	30	10	13	7	40	29	+11	33	
7	Videoton	30	10	12	8	45	40	+5	32	
8	Újpest	30	8	13	9	41	38	+3	29	Qualification for Cup Winners' Cup first round
9	Pécs	30	10	9	11	27	34	−7	29	
10	BVSC	30	7	12	11	29	34	−5	26	
11	Győr	30	8	10	12	34	43	−9	26	
12	Veszprém	30	7	10	13	20	42	−22	24	
13	Haladás (R)	30	7	8	15	27	42	−15	22	Qualification for relegation play-offs
14	Diósgyőr (O)	30	6	10	14	24	44	−20	22	Qualification for relegation play-offs
15	Tatabányai Bányász (R)	30	6	8	16	27	53	−26	20	Relegation to Nemzeti Bajnokság II
16	Zalaegerszeg (R)	30	3	7	20	20	60	−40	13	Relegation to Nemzeti Bajnokság II

Source: rsssf.com
(C) Champions; (O) Play-off winners; (R) Relegated

== Results ==
Home \ Away	BVS	DIÓ	FTC	GYŐ	HAL	HON	MTK	PÉC	SIÓ	TAT	UTE	VAS	VÁC	VES	VID	ZTE
BVSC		2–1	0–0	0–0	1–0	1–0	1–1	0–0	1–1	1–1	1–1	3–1	1–0	0–0	1–2	4–0
Diósgyőr	0–0		0–2	2–1	2–1	1–4	1–0	0–1	0–2	0–2	2–2	1–2	0–1	0–0	2–0	1–1
Ferencváros	1–0	3–2		2–1	2–2	0–0	1–2	2–0	5–0	3–1	3–2	1–0	3–1	2–0	2–0	7–0
Győr	2–1	1–1	1–6		3–2	0–3	1–0	2–1	1–2	3–1	2–0	2–2	1–1	0–0	3–0	4–2
Haladás	1–2	2–0	1–1	3–0		0–2	2–1	0–0	1–0	0–2	1–0	0–0	1–1	0–1	2–4	0–1
Kispest Honvéd	1–0	3–0	0–2	2–0	4–0		0–3	2–1	3–0	3–1	2–0	0–1	2–4	2–0	4–1	1–1
MTK Hungária	2–1	1–2	0–2	1–0	1–1	2–2		1–0	0–1	2–1	2–2	3–3	3–1	6–1	0–0	2–1
Pécs	2–1	0–0	1–0	2–0	1–1	0–4	0–0		1–2	3–0	1–0	1–1	1–3	0–0	0–0	3–2
Siófoki Bányász	3–1	1–2	1–1	2–1	3–1	0–1	0–1	3–2		2–0	4–3	1–1	1–2	4–0	0–0	4–1
Tatabánya	1–0	0–0	1–1	0–0	0–2	1–3	0–3	1–2	1–5		2–2	1–0	0–1	1–2	1–1	2–0
Újpest	1–1	2–1	1–1	2–2	3–1	2–2	3–0	3–1	0–0	3–0		1–0	1–2	0–1	1–4	2–0
Vasas	2–0	2–2	1–1	0–0	0–0	1–0	3–1	3–0	1–2	4–1	1–1		1–1	3–1	4–1	0–0
Vác	1–1	5–1	1–1	1–0	2–0	3–1	3–0	2–0	1–2	3–0	0–0	2–1		1–0	1–1	5–2
Veszprém	0–1	0–0	0–2	2–1	2–0	0–2	0–2	1–1	1–0	1–2	0–0	1–1	0–1		4–4	1–0
Videoton	3–3	3–0	0–0	1–1	2–0	2–1	1–3	0–1	0–0	2–2	1–1	1–0	1–2	5–0		3–1
Zalaegerszeg	2–0	0–0	0–4	1–1	1–2	0–3	0–1	0–1	1–0	1–1	0–2	0–1	1–2	1–1	0–2	

Source: rsssf.com
Legend: Blue = home team win; Yellow = draw; Red = away team win.

== Relegation play-offs ==
Team 1	Agg.	Team 2	1st leg	2nd leg
Nyíregyháza (II)	1–1 (5–3 p)	Haladás (I)	1–0	0–1 (a.e.t.)
Diósgyőr (I)	3–1	BKV Előre (II)	2–1	1–0

== Statistical leaders ==
=== Top goalscorers ===
Rank	Scorer	Club	Goals
1	(Hungary) Pál Fischer	Siófoki Bányász	16
1	(Hungary) Ferenc Orosz	Vác FC Samsung	16
3	(Hungary) István Sallói	Videoton SC	14
4	(Hungary) István Vincze	Kispest Honvéd FC	13
5	(Hungary) Dénes Eszenyi	Újpesti TE	12
6	(Hungary) Imre Fodor	Siófoki Bányász / Ferencvárosi TC	11
6	(Romania) Adrian Negrău	Kispest Honvéd FC	11
6	(Hungary) László Wukovics	Ferencvárosi TC	11
9	(Hungary) Kálmán Kovács	Kispest Honvéd FC	10
10	(Hungary) Péter Lipcsei	Ferencvárosi TC	9
10	(Hungary) Lajos Takács	Videoton SC	9

== Attendances ==
Average home league attendance top 3:

#	Club	Average
1	Ferencváros	12,367
2	Diósgyör	11,200
3	Szombathelyi Haladás	8,833
