= 1995–96 Magyar Kupa =

Tournament details
- Country: Hungary

Final positions
- Champions: Kispest Honvéd
- Runners-up: BVSC

The 1995–96 Magyar Kupa (English: Hungarian Cup) was the 56th season of Hungary's annual knock-out cup football competition.

== Quarter-finals ==
Team 1	Agg.	Team 2	1st leg	2nd leg
BVSC	2–2 (a)	Debrecen	0–0	2–2
Újpest	4–3	Paks	2–2	2–1
Vác	3–2	Zalaegerszeg	2–1	1–1
Kispest Honvéd	6–4	Ferencváros	2–2	4–2

== Semi-finals ==
Team 1	Agg.	Team 2	1st leg	2nd leg
BVSC	2–0	Újpest	1–0	2–0
Vác	0–5	Kispest Honvéd	0–3	0–2

== Final ==
8 June 1996
20:00 (UTC+2)

BVSC	1–0	Kispest Honvéd
Csábi 35'	Report

Szőnyi úti Stadion, Budapest
Attendance: 3,000
Referee: László Molnár (Hungary)
20 June 1996
20:00 (UTC+2)

Kispest Honvéd	2–0	BVSC
	Report	Piroska 84'; Árgyelán 86'

Bozsik József Stadion, Budapest
Attendance: 8,000
Referee: Sándor Puhl (Hungary)

== See also ==
- 1995–96 Nemzeti Bajnokság I
