= László Arany =

Hungarian footballer

Personal information
- Date of birth: 9 March 1971 (age 55)
- Place of birth: Tatabánya
- Position: Midfielder

Senior career*
Years	Team	Apps	(Gls)
1989–1992	Tatabánya Banyasz SC		
1992–1994	Keszthelyi Haladás		
1994–1995	Debreceni VSC		
1996–1997	Ferencvárosi TC		
1997	→ Kispesti Honvéd FC		
1997	Debreceni VSC		
1998–1999	Zalaegerszegi TE		
2000	FC Tatabánya		
2000–2001	Nyíregyháza Spartacus FC		
2001–2002	Hajdúdorog Szövetkezetek		

International career
1995–1996	Hungary	3	(0)
- * Club domestic league appearances and goals

László Arany (born 9 March 1971) is a retired Hungarian football midfielder.
