= Attila Kámán =

Hungarian footballer

Personal information
- Full name: Attila Kámán
- Date of birth: 20 November 1969 (age 56)
- Place of birth: Hungary
- Height: 1.80 m (5 ft 11 in)
- Position: Forward

Youth career
- 1983–1987: Zalaegerszegi TE

Senior career*
Years	Team	Apps	(Gls)
1987–1990	Zalaegerszegi TE	53	(18)
1990–1991	Budapest Honvéd	18	(2)
1991–1993	BFC Siófok	58	(16)
1993	Csepel SC	14	(4)
1994–1995	Yukong Elephant	13	(1)
1996	Csepel SC	5	(0)
1996–1999	Zalaegerszegi TE	61	(20)
2000	Hévíz LC	12	(3)
2001–	ASK Wallendorf		

International career
1992	Hungary	1	(0)
- * Club domestic league appearances and goals

Attila Kámán (born November 20, 1969) is a Hungarian footballer, who played as a forward.

== Club career ==
He played for Jeju United of the South Korean K League, then known as Yukong Elephant.
