= 1992–93 Nemzeti Bajnokság I =

Nemzeti Bajnokság I
- Season: 1992–93
- Champions: Kispest Honvéd
- Relegated: Diósgyőr; Nyíregyháza; Veszprém
- Champions League: Kispest Honvéd
- UEFA Cup: Vác; MTK Hungária
- Cup Winners' Cup: Ferencváros
- Matches: 240
- Goals: 597 (2.49 per match)
- Top goalscorer: László Répási (16)

Statistics of Nemzeti Bajnokság I in the 1992–93 season.

== Overview ==
It was contested by 16 teams, and Kispest-Honvéd FC won the championship for the thirteenth time in their history. The Finnish headcoach of the eventual champions, Martii Kuuseal, had never coached a Hungarian club prior to his appointment at the red and blacks in October 1992. An extra slot for the UEFA Cup was awarded to Hungary after the 1993 Polish football scandal.

Similar to previous years, Vác and Kispest were in a title-race for the entire season. runners-up Vác FC started off the season better than their 19th districtian counterparts, as the red and blues lead the table by 3 points by Matchday 10. On Matchday 9, 10-men Vác defeated Honvéd 2–0, which was the deciding factor in Kispest firing headcoach József Verebes. His replacement was Martii Kuuseal, who immediately took Kispest on a 9-game unbeaten streak, 8 of which were consecutive wins. Going in to Matchday 28, Vác's lead over Honvéd had decreased to a single point. Vác lost against defending champions, Ferencváros (who handed Honvéd their only home defeat of the season in August) 1–3, while Honvéd defeated Veszprém 1–2, and took the #1 spot on the table, where they remained until the end of the campaign, 19 June.

== League standings ==
Pos	Team	Pld	W	D	L	GF	GA	GD	Pts	Qualification or relegation
1	Kispest Honvéd (C)	30	19	5	6	59	28	+31	43	Qualification for Champions League first round
2	Vác	30	17	8	5	48	28	+20	42	Qualification for UEFA Cup first round
3	Ferencváros	30	19	3	8	49	28	+21	41	Qualification for Cup Winners' Cup first round
4	MTK Hungária	30	14	8	8	59	37	+22	36	Qualification for UEFA Cup first round
5	Békéscsaba	30	12	12	6	42	31	+11	36	
6	Videoton	30	15	5	10	42	34	+8	35	
7	Csepel	30	12	6	12	29	37	−8	30	
8	Siófoki Bányász	30	11	7	12	36	39	−3	29	
9	Győr	30	10	9	11	38	43	−5	29	
10	Vasas	30	7	13	10	31	33	−2	27	
11	PMSC Fordan	30	10	7	13	35	39	−4	27	
12	BVSC	30	10	6	14	32	37	−5	26	
13	Diósgyőr (R)	30	7	9	14	26	45	−19	23	Qualification for relegation play-offs
14	Újpest (O)	30	4	12	14	29	45	−16	20	Qualification for relegation play-offs
15	Nyíregyháza (R)	30	3	12	15	17	39	−22	18	Relegation to Nemzeti Bajnokság II
16	Veszprém (R)	30	6	6	18	25	54	−29	18	Relegation to Nemzeti Bajnokság II

Source: rsssf.com
(C) Champions; (O) Play-off winners; (R) Relegated

== Results ==
Home \ Away	BÉK	BVS	CSE	DIÓ	FTC	GYŐ	HON	MTK	NYÍ	PÉC	SIÓ	UTE	VAS	VÁC	VES	VID
Békéscsaba		2–0	1–1	2–1	2–1	2–0	2–2	3–1	1–0	1–1	1–2	2–0	0–0	1–1	4–2	2–2
BVSC	1–1		3–1	0–1	0–1	0–1	0–3	1–2	0–0	2–1	1–2	3–2	0–1	0–0	5–2	2–1
Csepel	2–1	1–0		1–1	0–2	1–1	1–2	2–1	3–1	4–1	1–0	2–1	1–1	0–2	0–0	1–0
Diósgyőr	1–1	0–1	1–0		0–4	0–1	1–5	2–2	1–0	1–1	1–0	3–3	1–0	2–1	1–1	0–1
Ferencváros	2–1	0–2	0–1	3–1		2–2	1–0	1–0	1–0	0–2	2–1	3–0	1–1	0–1	1–0	2–0
Győr	0–0	1–2	2–0	1–0	4–2		3–2	1–1	0–0	3–1	2–2	2–1	2–2	1–2	3–0	1–0
Kispest Honvéd	1–0	3–1	5–0	1–0	0–1	1–0		1–0	5–0	3–1	2–1	1–1	2–1	1–1	4–2	3–0
MTK Hungária	2–3	0–0	4–0	3–0	4–3	7–1	2–1		4–0	1–1	3–0	1–0	1–0	2–3	4–1	2–1
Nyíregyháza	0–1	1–1	1–2	0–0	1–2	2–1	0–2	2–2		0–2	3–2	1–1	1–1	1–1	2–1	0–1
PMSC Fordan	2–0	1–0	2–1	1–2	0–1	3–1	3–3	0–0	1–0		1–2	1–0	1–1	0–1	1–0	2–0
Siófoki Bányász	2–2	0–0	1–0	1–1	1–2	1–1	2–1	1–4	0–0	1–0		2–1	1–0	1–1	0–1	2–1
Újpest	1–1	1–3	0–0	2–2	0–0	1–1	0–1	1–2	0–0	1–0	3–1		2–2	0–0	3–2	0–1
Vasas	1–1	1–1	1–0	3–2	0–3	4–1	1–2	1–1	0–0	3–1	0–1	3–1		0–1	0–1	1–1
Vác	2–0	3–1	1–0	2–0	1–3	2–1	2–0	2–0	1–0	4–2	2–1	1–1	0–1		4–0	2–2
Veszprém	0–2	0–1	1–2	1–0	0–3	1–0	1–2	1–1	1–1	1–1	0–4	0–1	0–0	3–2		2–1
Videoton	0–0	2–1	0–1	3–0	3–2	1–0	0–0	4–2	1–0	2–1	2–1	4–1	3–1	4–2	1–0	

Source: rsssf.com
Legend: Blue = home team win; Yellow = draw; Red = away team win.

== Relegation play-offs ==
Team 1	Agg.	Team 2	1st leg	2nd leg
Hatvan (II)	1–2	Újpest (I)	1–2	0–0
Diósgyőr (I)	1–5	EMDSZ Sopron (II)	1–0	0–5

== Statistical leaders ==
=== Top goalscorers ===
Rank	Scorer	Club	Goals
1	(Hungary) László Répási	Vác FC	16
2	(Hungary) Tibor Balog	MTK Hungária	12
2	(Hungary) László Wukovics	Ferencvárosi TC	12
4	(Hungary) István Sallói	Videoton SC	11
5	(Hungary) György Bognár	Budapesti VSC	10
5	(Hungary) Ferenc Horváth	Videoton SC	10
5	(Hungary) József Kovács	Siófoki Bányász	10
8	(Hungary) Antal Füle	Vác FC	9
8	(Hungary) Attila Kámán	Siófoki Bányász	9
8	(Hungary) Gyula Zsivóczky	MTK Hungária	9

== Attendances ==
Average home league attendance top 3:

#	Club	Average
1	Ferencváros	12,258
2	Diósgyör	9,000
3	Nyíregyháza Spartacus	8,267
