= Gázszer FC =

Hungarian football club

- Full name: Gázszer Futball Club
- Founded: 1994
- Dissolved: 2000
- Ground: Stadler Stadium
- Capacity: 10,863 (seated)
Home colours	Away colours

Gázszer Futball Club was a Hungarian football club from the town of Gárdony.

== History ==
Gázszer Futball Club debuted in the 1997–98 season of the Hungarian League and finished eighth.

== Name Changes ==
- 1973–1988: Agárdi MEDOSZ
- 1994–1995: Gázszer Futball Club
- 1995–?: Gázszer Futball Club-Agárd
- ?-1999: Gázszer Futball Club
- 2000: went bankrupt and was replaced by Pécsi MFC in the 1999-2000 Nemzeti Bajnokság I

== Seasons ==
The table below shows the seasons of Gázszer.

Season	Tier	Club's name	Position	Pts
1973–74	7	Agárdi MEDOSZ	4 / 14	33
1974–75	6	Agárdi MEDOSZ	3 / 14	31
1975–76	6	Agárdi MEDOSZ	6 / 14	29
1976–77	6	Agárdi MEDOSZ	5 / 13	28
1977–78	5	Agárdi MEDOSZ	12 / 15	19
1978–79	4	Agárdi MEDOSZ	12 / 16	25
1979–80	4	Agárd	9 / 16	28
1980–81	4	Agárd	14 / 16	14
1981–82	5	Agárd	4 / 15	30
1982–83	5	Agárd	11 / 12	11
1984–85	5	Agárd	11 / 14	17
1985–86	5	Agárd	6 / 10	18
1986–87	6	Agárd	4 / 10	21
1987–88	6	Agárd	11 / 13	16
1988–89	6	Velencetours SC	1 / 10	30
1989–90	5	Velencetours SC	3 / 16	56
1990–91	4	Velencetours SC	3 / 16	41
1991–92	4	Velencetours SC	10 / 16	30
1992–93	4	Velencetours SC	2 / 16	47
1993–94	4	Velencetours SC	3 / 16	34
1994–95	4	Gázszer FC	1 / 16	82
1995–96	3	Gázszer FC (Agárd)	1 / 16	70
1996–97	2	Gázszer FC-Agárd	1 / 16	68
1997–98	1	Gázszer FC	8 / 18	49
1998–99	1	Gázszer FC	11 / 18	44
