= Dénes Eszenyi =

Hungarian footballer

Personal information
- Date of birth: 9 January 1968 (age 58)
- Place of birth: Nyíregyháza, Hungary
- Position: Forward

Youth career
- Nyíregyháza Spartacus

Senior career*
Years	Team	Apps	(Gls)
1986–1992	Újpest	98	(29)
1992–1995	K.V. Mechelen	45	(9)
1995	→ Pécs	11	(2)
1995	→ Kispesti Honved	5	(1)
1996	→ Hapoel Tzafririm Holon	21	(7)
1996–1997	→ Bnei Yehuda	1	(0)
1997	Eintracht Trier	4	(0)
1997–1998	Újpest	25	(8)
1999	Ferencváros	9	(0)
1999	Maccabi Petah Tikva	7	(0)
1999–2000	Hapoel Ramat Gan		(5)
2000–2001	BKV Előre		

International career
1990–1994	Hungary	12	(1)
- * Club domestic league appearances and goals

Dénes Eszenyi (born 9 January 1968) is a retired Hungarian football striker.
