= 1997–98 Magyar Kupa =

Tournament details
- Country: Hungary

Final positions
- Champions: MTK Budapest
- Runners-up: Újpest

The 1997–98 Magyar Kupa (English: Hungarian Cup) was the 59th season of Hungary's annual knock-out cup football competition.

MTK Hungária, Újpest, Ferencváros, Vasas and BVSC joined the tournament in the round of 32 as participants of European competitions.

== Round of 32 ==
Team 1	Score	Team 2
Zalaegerszeg	4–1	Matáv Sopron
Stadler	3–1	Szolnok
Csenger	0–2	Haladás
Szabadegyháza	0–4	Újpest
III. Kerület	3–1	BVSC
Gázszer	4–2	Békéscsaba
Paks	0–2	Szeged-Dorozsma
Salgótarján	3–1	Csepel
Jánossomorja	1–6	Siófok
Győr	3–1	Nagykanizsa
Tiszakécske	0–3	Vác
Videoton	4–0	Nyíregyháza
Dorog	0–2	MTK Hungária
Diósgyőr	2–1	Ferencváros
Százhalombatta	1–1	Vasas
Kispest Honvéd	2–1	Tiszavasvári

== Round of 16 ==
Team 1	Score	Team 2
Zalaegerszeg	2–0	Stadler
Haladás	2–3	Újpest
III. Kerület	0–0; 4–5 (pen.)	Gázszer
Szeged-Dorozsma	1–2	Salgótarján
Siófok	2–1	Győr
Vác	2–0	Videoton
MTK Hungária	1–0	Diósgyőr
Vasas	4–3	Kispest Honvéd

== Quarter-finals ==
Team 1	Score	Team 2
Újpest	2–1	Gázszer
Salgótarján	0–0; 3–1 (pen.)	Siófok
MTK Hungária	4–0	Vác
Vasas	1–0	Zalaegerszeg

== Semi-finals ==
Team 1	Score	Team 2
Vasas	2–2 (a.e.t.); 4–5 (pen.)	MTK Hungária
Újpest	2–0	Salgótarján

== Final ==
13 May 1998
20:00 (UTC+2)

MTK Hungária	1–0	Újpest
Kuttor 73'	Report

Fáy utca, Angyalföld
Attendance: 12,000
Referee: Vencel Tóth (Hungary)

== See also ==
- 1997–98 Nemzeti Bajnokság I
