= 1995–96 Nemzeti Bajnokság I =

Nemzeti Bajnokság I
- Season: 1995–96
- Champions: Ferencváros
- Relegated: None
- Champions League: Ferencváros
- UEFA Cup: Budapesti VSC
- Cup Winners' Cup: Kispest-Honvéd
- Intertoto Cup: Vasas
- Matches: 240
- Goals: 678 (2.83 per match)
- Top goalscorer: Ihor Nichenko (18)
- Biggest home win: MTK 8–2 Győr
- Biggest away win: Haladás 1–5 BVSC
- Highest scoring: MTK 8–2 Győr

The 1995–96 Nemzeti Bajnokság I, also known as NB I, was the 94th season of top-tier football in Hungary. The season started on 4 August 1995 and ended on 24 June 1996.

== Overview ==
It was contested by 16 teams, and Ferencvárosi TC won the championship, becoming the first Hungarian club of the '90's to successfully defend their national title.

Although starting off the season with a shock 2–1 defeat in Debrecen, Ferencváros went on a 4-week winning streak in August, then on a 6-week winning streak between September and November. By the winter break, BVSC were top of the table, 3 points clear of FTC. In fact, BVSC handed the green and whites their second home defeat of the season in November, when they coincidentally ended Ferencváros' 6-game winning streak. BVSC's good form carried over through to the spring, however, the team from Zugló lost 4 games in May and June, including three back-to-back defeats. The third defeat came against Ferencváros in Round 29, which made it mathematically impossible for BVSC to be champions.

Ferencváros won their 26th championship, 5 point clear off BVSC-Zugló.

== League standings ==
Pos	Team	Pld	W	D	L	GF	GA	GD	Pts	Qualification or relegation
1	Ferencváros (C)	30	21	3	6	56	25	+31	66	Qualification for Champions League qualifying round
2	BVSC	30	18	7	5	50	29	+21	61	Qualification for UEFA Cup qualifying round
3	Újpest	30	12	12	6	43	31	+12	48	
4	Debrecen	30	14	6	10	49	40	+9	48	
5	MTK Hungária	30	13	7	10	58	43	+15	46	
6	Kispest Honvéd	30	12	10	8	49	35	+14	46	Qualification for Cup Winners' Cup qualifying round
7	Vasas	30	12	10	8	44	40	+4	46	Qualification for Intertoto Cup group stage
8	Csepel	30	11	9	10	46	45	+1	42	
9	Stadler	30	8	12	10	35	41	−6	36	
10	Zalaegerszeg	30	8	10	12	42	48	−6	34	
11	Vác	30	7	12	11	39	46	−7	33	
12	Haladás	30	8	8	14	30	48	−18	32	
13	Fehérvár (O)	30	8	7	15	38	54	−16	31	Qualification for relegation play-offs
14	Békéscsaba (O)	30	6	11	13	33	46	−13	29	Qualification for relegation play-offs
15	Győr (O)	30	6	9	15	34	54	−20	27	Qualification for relegation play-offs
16	Pécs (Note: 3 points deducted) (O)	30	7	5	18	32	53	−21	23	Qualification for relegation play-offs

Source: rsssf.com
(C) Champions; (O) Play-off winners

== Results ==
Home \ Away	BÉK	BVS	CSE	DEB	FEH	FTC	GYŐ	HAL	HON	MTK	PÉC	STA	VAS	VÁC	UTE	ZTE
Békéscsaba		0–1	2–2	2–2	3–1	1–3	3–1	2–1	1–0	3–1	1–2	0–0	2–3	1–1	2–3	1–1
BVSC	1–1		0–2	2–0	2–1	0–1	2–0	2–1	2–0	0–2	2–0	2–2	2–0	1–0	1–0	3–2
Csepel	1–1	2–3		1–2	2–2	1–2	3–2	0–3	2–1	5–0	2–0	1–0	4–1	1–0	1–1	0–0
Debrecen	1–0	1–1	5–0		2–1	2–1	4–1	3–0	2–1	0–0	1–0	4–1	2–3	2–1	2–0	2–2
Fehérvár	0–0	1–2	1–3	4–1		1–2	0–2	1–1	3–2	3–1	3–1	0–0	0–1	2–1	2–2	1–2
Ferencváros	3–0	1–3	2–1	1–0	2–1		2–0	0–0	3–1	3–1	3–1	3–0	0–2	2–0	2–0	1–1
Győr	0–0	1–1	3–2	1–3	0–0	2–5		3–0	1–2	1–0	1–0	2–2	1–3	2–4	4–0	2–2
Haladás	3–1	1–5	1–2	2–1	1–2	0–3	1–0		1–0	2–2	0–1	1–0	1–1	2–5	1–1	2–1
Kispest Honvéd	1–1	1–1	1–1	0–0	5–0	1–0	0–0	4–0		2–1	2–2	2–1	3–2	2–0	1–1	3–0
MTK Hungária	1–0	2–2	1–2	3–1	5–2	2–1	8–2	3–1	0–1		2–1	3–3	0–0	5–0	1–2	3–0
Pécs	3–1	0–2	3–2	1–0	1–2	1–0	2–2	0–1	2–4	0–3		3–1	1–3	0–0	0–2	3–3
Stadler	3–1	3–1	0–0	3–2	2–0	0–3	1–0	2–1	1–1	0–1	3–1		1–0	1–2	0–0	1–1
Vasas	1–1	1–0	1–1	1–0	2–0	0–1	0–0	1–1	2–4	1–3	2–1	2–2		2–2	2–2	2–0
Vác	1–2	2–3	0–0	1–1	2–2	1–2	0–0	0–0	3–3	2–1	1–1	1–1	3–2		1–0	2–1
Újpest	2–0	0–0	5–1	4–0	4–0	1–1	1–0	2–1	2–1	0–0	1–0	1–1	1–1	2–2		3–2
Zalaegerszeg	3–0	1–3	2–1	2–3	0–2	1–3	3–0	0–0	0–0	3–3	3–1	2–0	1–2	2–1	1–0	

Source: rsssf.com
Legend: Blue = home team win; Yellow = draw; Red = away team win.

== Relegation play-offs ==
Team 1	Agg.	Team 2	1st leg	2nd leg
Fehérvár (I)	4–3	Diósgyőr (II)	2–1	2–2 (a.e.t.)
Rákóczi Kaposcukor (II)	0–5	Békéscsaba (I)	0–0	0–5
Győr (I)	3–2	Sopron (II)	2–0	1–2 (a.e.t.)
Tiszakécske (II)	0–0 (3–5 p)	Pécs (I)	0–0	0–0 (a.e.t.)

== Statistical leaders ==
=== Top goalscorers ===
Rank	Scorer	Club	Goals
1	(Ukraine) Ihor Nichenko	Stadler FC / Ferencvárosi TC	18
2	(Hungary) Ferenc Orosz	Budapesti VSC	15
3	(Hungary) Tamás Sándor	Debreceni VSC-Epona	14
4	(Hungary) Ferenc Horváth	FC Fehérvár	12
4	(Hungary) Béla Illés	MTK Hungária	12
6	(Hungary) Miklós Baranyi	Csepel SC	11
6	(Romania) Nicolae Ilea	Debreceni VSC-Epona	11
6	(Hungary) István Vincze	Budapesti VSC	11
9	(Hungary) László Arany	Debreceni VSC-Epona / Ferencvárosi TC	10
9	(Hungary) Tamás Németh	Zalaegerszegi TE	10
9	(Hungary) János Szarvas	Békéscsabai Előre	10

== Attendances ==
#	Club	Average
1	Ferencváros	10,594
2	Debrecen	7,267
3	Zalaegerszeg	7,000
4	Szombathelyi Haladás	6,933
5	BVSC	6,033
6	Videoton	5,367
7	Békéscsaba	5,067
8	Győr	4,900
9	Újpest	4,433
10	Vasas	4,133
11	Kispest Honvéd	3,600
12	Vác	3,233
13	Pécs	3,153
14	Stadler	2,867
15	MTK	2,867
16	Csepel	2,000

== See also ==
- 1995–96 Magyar Kupa
- 1995–96 Nemzeti Bajnokság II
- 1995–96 Nemzeti Bajnokság III
