= 1997–98 Nemzeti Bajnokság I =

Nemzeti Bajnokság I
- Season: 1997–98
- Champions: Újpest
- Relegated: Tiszakécske; Békéscsaba; Stadler
- Champions League: Újpest
- UEFA Cup: Ferencváros
- Cup Winners' Cup: MTK Budapest
- Intertoto Cup: Debrecen; Diósgyőr
- Matches: 306
- Goals: 850 (2.78 per match)
- Top goalscorer: Krisztián Tiber (20)
- Biggest home win: Videoton 8–0 Tiszakécske; Debrecen 8–0 Békéscsaba
- Biggest away win: Vác 2–6 Vasas; Vasas 2–6 Gázszer
- Highest scoring: Vác 2–6 Vasas; Vasas 2–6 Gázszer; BVSC 5–3 Zalaegerszeg; Videoton 8–0 Tiszakécske; Debrecen 8–0 Békéscsaba

The 1997–98 Nemzeti Bajnokság I, also known as NB I, was the 96th season of top-tier football in Hungary. The league was officially named Raab–Karcher NB1 for sponsoring reasons. The season started on 18 July 1997 and ended on 6 June 1998.

== Overview ==
It was contested by 18 teams, and Újpesti TE won the championship, claiming their twentieth national title. The purple and whites were leading the table by matchday 10, 8 points above Ferencváros, however the club suffered defeats to Budapest-based clubs Vasas and FTC, and by Matyhday 15, Újpest's lead over FTC had been cut to a single point. In the second half of the season, Újpest remained undefeated, bagging 13 wins out of 15 games. Újpest only lost three home games throughout the season, and in a rare achievement went unbeaten away during the campaign. The 4th districtians' championship was confirmed on May 30, after they drew 1-1 at Fehérvár. Ferencváros' 4-1 loss against defending champions MTK meant that FTC's 6 point deficit to their biggest rivals could not be overcome. To this day, this remains Újpest's last national title.

== League table ==
Pos	Team	Pld	W	D	L	GF	GA	GD	Pts	Qualification or relegation
1	Újpest (C)	34	21	10	3	62	26	+36	73	Qualification for Champions League first qualifying round
2	Ferencváros	34	20	7	7	63	43	+20	67	Qualification for UEFA Cup first qualifying round
3	Vasas	34	19	7	8	66	41	+25	64	
4	Győr	34	18	9	7	47	31	+16	63	
5	MTK Hungária	34	17	7	10	60	35	+25	58	Qualification for Cup Winners' Cup qualifying round
6	Vác	34	15	6	13	45	47	−2	51	
7	Zalaegerszeg	34	15	5	14	58	42	+16	50	
8	Gázszer	34	12	13	9	55	45	+10	49	
9	Debrecen	34	13	9	12	46	48	−2	48	Qualification for Intertoto Cup first round
10	BVSC	34	12	10	12	49	43	+6	46	
11	Diósgyőri	34	12	8	14	46	41	+5	44	Qualification for Intertoto Cup first round
12	Siófoki Bányász	34	11	8	15	38	43	−5	41	
13	Haladás	34	9	9	16	38	47	−9	36	
14	Kispest Honvéd	34	10	6	18	41	57	−16	36	
15	Tiszakécske (R)	34	8	8	18	36	75	−39	32	Qualification for relegation play-offs
16	Videoton (O)	34	7	10	17	43	58	−15	31	Qualification for relegation play-offs
17	Békéscsaba (R)	34	7	10	17	28	61	−33	31	Relegation to Nemzeti Bajnokság II
18	Stadler (R)	34	4	10	20	29	67	−38	22	Relegation to Nemzeti Bajnokság II

Source: rsssf.com
(C) Champions; (O) Play-off winners; (R) Relegated

== Results ==
Home \ Away	BÉK	BVS	DEB	DIÓ	FTC	GÁZ	GYŐ	HAL	HON	MTK	SIÓ	STA	TIS	VAS	VÁC	VID	UTE	ZTE
Békéscsaba		0–1	1–1	1–1	1–0	1–2	1–1	1–0	1–0	2–3	2–2	1–0	3–3	0–2	0–2	4–0	1–2	1–1
BVSC	3–0		2–1	0–0	0–1	3–1	1–0	1–1	3–1	1–0	0–2	4–1	5–1	3–3	0–1	2–0	0–1	5–3
Debrecen	8–0	2–1		2–1	1–0	2–0	1–2	1–1	4–1	1–0	1–0	1–1	2–0	1–2	1–1	3–0	1–2	4–3
Diósgyőr	0–0	4–0	2–0		0–2	1–1	1–0	3–2	5–1	1–3	2–2	2–2	4–0	1–1	2–2	4–1	0–2	4–0
Ferencváros	2–1	2–2	3–0	1–0		1–1	1–0	2–1	4–1	1–4	0–2	4–1	3–1	1–0	3–2	4–1	1–1	3–2
Gázszer	1–2	1–1	0–0	1–0	2–2		1–0	1–1	3–0	1–1	3–1	3–3	3–1	2–0	4–0	1–1	1–2	1–1
Győr	1–0	0–0	1–1	1–0	2–3	1–0		3–0	0–0	0–0	2–1	3–0	2–1	0–3	3–0	3–2	1–1	2–1
Haladás	4–0	0–0	0–1	1–2	1–2	1–3	0–0		1–0	0–1	2–2	3–2	1–0	1–1	2–1	3–1	1–1	0–2
Kispest Honvéd	0–0	1–1	5–1	2–1	1–0	2–0	0–1	1–0		1–4	2–0	0–1	5–0	1–2	2–1	2–0	0–2	2–1
MTK Hungária	5–0	4–3	1–1	0–1	2–2	4–2	2–4	0–1	2–0		2–0	5–0	5–2	3–1	2–0	3–1	1–2	0–2
Siófok	0–2	2–1	1–1	1–0	0–1	1–2	1–3	0–1	1–0	2–0		3–0	3–2	1–0	1–2	0–1	1–1	1–0
Stadler	0–0	0–2	2–0	0–1	2–2	1–1	0–1	3–2	2–2	0–1	0–0		1–1	1–3	1–2	1–1	0–3	0–1
Tiszakécske	0–0	3–3	2–0	2–0	1–2	1–1	1–2	4–3	2–1	0–0	1–1	1–0		0–3	1–0	2–1	0–0	1–0
Vasas	4–0	2–0	4–1	2–1	3–1	2–6	1–1	1–2	1–1	1–0	3–2	2–0	3–2		1–2	1–1	0–0	2–0
Vác	2–0	2–0	1–2	2–0	3–2	1–1	1–2	2–0	3–2	1–0	1–1	3–1	1–0	2–6		2–1	0–1	0–0
Videoton	5–1	1–1	0–0	0–1	1–1	4–2	0–0	2–1	2–1	0–0	2–3	1–3	8–0	1–3	1–0		1–1	1–1
Újpest	4–1	1–0	5–0	2–0	1–2	2–1	2–3	3–1	2–2	1–1	2–0	4–0	3–0	1–2	2–2	2–1		1–0
Zalaegerszeg	1–0	1–0	3–0	4–1	2–4	1–2	4–2	0–0	6–1	0–1	1–0	4–0	6–0	2–1	2–0	2–0	1–2	

Source: rsssf.com
Legend: Blue = home team win; Yellow = draw; Red = away team win.

== Relegation play-offs ==
Team 1	Agg.	Team 2	1st leg	2nd leg
Tiszakécske (I)	2–3	III. Kerület (II)	1–2	1–1
Videoton (I)	5–1	Sopron (II)	2–1	3–0

== Statistical leaders ==
=== Top goalscorers ===
Rank	Scorer	Club	Goals
1	(Hungary) Krisztián Tiber	Gázszer FC	20
2	(Hungary) Ferenc Hámori	Vasas SC	17
2	(Hungary) Zoltán Váczi	Vasas SC	17
4	(Hungary) Ferenc Orosz	MTK Hungária	16
5	(Romania) Nicolae Ilea	Debreceni VSC-Epona	15
6	(Romania) Sándor Kulcsár	Diósgyőri FC	13
6	(Hungary) Ferenc Horváth	Ferencvárosi TC	13
6	(Hungary) Miklós Fehér	Győri ETO FC	13
9	(Hungary) Ottó Vincze	Ferencvárosi TC	12
9	(Hungary) Krisztián Kenesei	MTK Hungária	12
9	(Hungary) Miklós Herczeg	Újpesti TE	12
9	(Hungary) Attila Kámán	Zalaegerszegi TE	12

== Attendances ==
No.	Club	Average
1	Diósgyör	12,647
2	Ferencváros	10,039
3	Győr	9,588
4	Zalaegerszeg	9,118
5	Debrecen	6,971
6	Haladás	6,824
7	Újpest	6,559
8	Videoton	5,206
9	Vasas	5,147
10	Békéscsaba	4,971
11	Siófok	4,529
12	Tiszakécske	4,388
13	Gázszer	3,382
14	Honvéd	3,250
15	Stadler	3,206
16	MTK	3,118
17	Vác	2,676
18	BVSC	2,182

== See also ==
- 1997–98 Magyar Kupa
- 1997–98 Nemzeti Bajnokság II
- 1997–98 Nemzeti Bajnokság III
