= Róbert Pálfi =

Hungarian footballer (born 1974)

Personal information
- Date of birth: 17 September 1974 (age 52)
- Place of birth: Ajka, Hungary
- Height: 1.80 m (5 ft 11 in)
- Position: Defender

Senior career*
Years	Team	Apps	(Gls)
1994–1996	Veszprém	67	(0)
1996–1997	Videoton	0	(0)
1997	→ Soproni FAC (loan)	15	(0)
1997–2001	Nagykanizsa	131	(1)
2001–2003	Siófok	16	(0)
2002	→ Balatonlelle (loan)	4	(0)
2003	Ajka	14	(5)
2003–2004	Tatabánya	19	(3)
2004–2007	Ajka	30	(5)
2007	→ Márkó (loan)		
2007–2008	Márkó	15	(0)
2008–2012	Veszprém	88	(4)
2012–2015	Alsóörs	72	(11)
2015–2016	Veszprém	21	(0)
2016–2017	Zirc	14	(1)
2017–2018	Balatonfüred	40	(5)
2018–2019	Fűzfő	26	(0)
2019–2024	Pét	109	(3)
Total		681	(38)
- * Club domestic league appearances and goals

Róbert Pálfi (born 17 September 1974) is a Hungarian former professional footballer who played as a defender.

== Career ==
On 31 July 1996, Pálfi signed with Nemzeti Bajnokság I club Videoton.

On 30 January 2003, he left Siófok following the financial difficulties of the club.

== Career statistics ==
Appearances and goals by club, season and competition
Club	Season	League			Magyar Kupa		Other		Total	
Club	Season	Division	Apps	Goals	Apps	Goals	Apps	Goals	Apps	Goals
Veszprém	1993–94	Nemzeti Bajnokság II	22	0	2	0	—		24	0
Veszprém	1994–95	Nemzeti Bajnokság II	19	0	—		—		19	0
Veszprém	1995–96	Nemzeti Bajnokság II	26	0	3	0	—		29	0
Veszprém	Total		67	0	5	0	—		72	0
Soproni FAC	1996–97	Nemzeti Bajnokság II	15	0	—		—		15	0
Nagykanizsa	1997–98	Nemzeti Bajnokság II	34	1	4	0	—		38	1
Nagykanizsa	1998–99	Nemzeti Bajnokság II	35	0	—		—		35	0
Nagykanizsa	1999–2000	Nemzeti Bajnokság I	31	0	—		—		31	0
Nagykanizsa	2000–01	Nemzeti Bajnokság I	12	0	2	0	—		33	0
Nagykanizsa	2000–01	Nemzeti Bajnokság II	19	0	2	0	—		33	0
Nagykanizsa	Total		131	1	6	0	—		137	1
Siófok	2001–02	Nemzeti Bajnokság II	16	0	3	0	—		19	0
Siófok	2002–03	Nemzeti Bajnokság I	0	0	—		—		0	0
Siófok	Total		16	0	3	0	—		19	0
Balatonlelle (loan)	2001–02	Nemzeti Bajnokság III	4	0	—		—		4	0
Ajka	2002–03	Nemzeti Bajnokság III	14	5	—		—		14	5
Tatabánya	2003–04	Nemzeti Bajnokság II	19	3	3	0	—		22	3
Ajka	2004–05	Nemzeti Bajnokság III			3	1	1 (Note: Appearance in Nemzeti Bajnokság III promotion play-offs)	0	4	1
Ajka	2005–06	Nemzeti Bajnokság II	27	5	2	0	—		29	5
Ajka	2006–07	Nemzeti Bajnokság III	3	0	1	0	—		4	0
Ajka	Total		30	5	6	1	1	0	37	6
Márkó	2007–08	Nemzeti Bajnokság III	15	0	—		—		15	0
Veszprém	2007–08	Nemzeti Bajnokság III	12	1	—		—		12	1
Veszprém	2008–09	Nemzeti Bajnokság III	28	1	3	0	—		31	1
Veszprém	2009–10	Nemzeti Bajnokság III	24	2	1	0	—		25	2
Veszprém	2010–11	Nemzeti Bajnokság II	16	0	—		—		16	0
Veszprém	2011–12	Nemzeti Bajnokság II	8	0	2	1	—		10	1
Veszprém	Total		88	4	6	1	—		94	5
Alsóörs	2012–13	Megyei Bajnokság I	23	4	—		—		23	4
Alsóörs	2013–14	Megyei Bajnokság I	23	1	—		1 (Note: Appearances in Magyar Kupa qualifying rounds)	0	24	1
Alsóörs	2014–15	Megyei Bajnokság I	26	6	—		1	0	27	6
Alsóörs	Total		72	11	—		2	0	74	11
Veszprém	2015–16	Megyei Bajnokság I	21	0	—		4 (Note: Two appearances in Magyar Kupa qualifying rounds, two appearances in Megyei Bajnokság I promotion play-offs)	0	25	0
Zirc	2016–17	Megyei Bajnokság I	14	1	1	1	—		15	2
Balatonfüred	2016–17	Megyei Bajnokság I	15	2	—		2 (Note: Appearances in Veszprém Megyei Kupa)	1	17	3
Balatonfüred	2017–18	Megyei Bajnokság I	25	3	1	0	5 (Note: Two appearances in Magyar Kupa qualifying rounds, two appearances in Veszprém Megyei Kupa, one appearance in promotion play-offs)	0	31	3
Balatonfüred	Total		40	5	1	0	7	1	48	6
Fűzfő	2018–19	Megyei Bajnokság I	26	0	1	0	4 (Note: Three appearances in Magyar Kupa qualifying rounds, one appearance in Veszprém Megyei Kupa)	0	31	0
Pét	2019–20	Megyei Bajnokság I	18	0	—		2	0	20	0
Pét	2020–21	Megyei Bajnokság I	28	2	—		2 (Note: One appearance in Magyar Kupa qualifying rounds, one appearance in Veszprém Megyei Kupa)	0	30	2
Pét	2021–22	Megyei Bajnokság I	28	1	—		5	0	33	1
Pét	2022–23	Megyei Bajnokság I	25	0	1	1	2	0	28	1
Pét	2023–24	Megyei Bajnokság I	10	0	—		—		10	0
Pét	Total		109	3	1	1	11	0	121	4
Career total			681	38	33	4	29	1	743	43

== Honours ==
Siófok

- Nemzeti Bajnokság II – West: 2001–02

Ajka

- Nemzeti Bajnokság III – Bakony: 2003–04
- Nemzeti Bajnokság III – Bakony: 2006–07

Márkó

- Megyei Bajnokság I – Veszprém: 2006–07

Veszprém

- Nemzeti Bajnokság III – Bakony: 2009–10
- Megyei Bajnokság I – Veszprém: 2015–16

Balatonfüred

- Megyei Bajnokság I – Veszprém: 2017–18

Pét

- Veszprém Megyei Kupa: 2021–22
