= József Farkas (footballer, born 1970) =

Hungarian footballer (born 1970)

Personal information
- Date of birth: 13 February 1970 (age 56)
- Height: 1.71 m (5 ft 7 in)
- Position: Midfielder

Senior career*
Years	Team	Apps	(Gls)
- Nagykanizsa TE
- Kaposvári Honvéd
1992–2002	Nagykanizsa FC	262	(14)
2003–2005	Zalakaros		
2005–2011	Nagykanizsa TE	84	(0)
2011–2014	Szepetnek	77	(0)
Total		423	(14)
- * Club domestic league appearances and goals

József Farkas (born 13 February 1970) is a Hungarian former professional footballer who played as a midfielder.

== Career ==
Farkas won the Nemzeti Bajnokság II West group with Nagykanizsa Olajbányász in the 1993–94 season, securing promotion to the top flight.

== Career statistics ==
Appearances and goals by club, season and competition
Club	Season	League			Magyar Kupa		Other		Total	
Club	Season	Division	Apps	Goals	Apps	Goals	Apps	Goals	Apps	Goals
Nagykanizsa FC	1992–93	Nemzeti Bajnokság II	21	3	—		—		21	3
Nagykanizsa FC	1993–94	Nemzeti Bajnokság II	29	5			—		29	5
Nagykanizsa FC	1994–95	Nemzeti Bajnokság I	23	0	1	0	—		24	0
Nagykanizsa FC	1995–96	Nemzeti Bajnokság II	14	0	5	0	—		19	0
Nagykanizsa FC	1996–97	Nemzeti Bajnokság II	25	0	1	0	—		26	0
Nagykanizsa FC	1997–98	Nemzeti Bajnokság II	36	2	4	0	—		40	2
Nagykanizsa FC	1998–99	Nemzeti Bajnokság II	30	2	—		—		30	2
Nagykanizsa FC	1999–2000	Nemzeti Bajnokság I	27	1	—		—		27	1
Nagykanizsa FC	2000–01	Nemzeti Bajnokság I	14	0	2	0	—		33	0
Nagykanizsa FC	2000–01	Nemzeti Bajnokság II	17	0	2	0	—		33	0
Nagykanizsa FC	2001–02	Nemzeti Bajnokság II	26	1	1	0	—		27	1
Nagykanizsa FC	Total		262	14	14	0	—		276	14
Nagykanizsai TE	2007–08	Nemzeti Bajnokság III	28	0	—		—		28	0
Nagykanizsai TE	2008–09	Nemzeti Bajnokság III	25	0	3	0	—		28	0
Nagykanizsai TE	2009–10	Nemzeti Bajnokság III	24	0	1	0	1 (Note: Appearances in Magyar Kupa qualifying rounds)	0	26	0
Nagykanizsai TE	2010–11	Nemzeti Bajnokság III	7	0	0	0	1	0	8	0
Nagykanizsai TE	Total		84	0	4	0	2	0	90	0
Szepetnek	2011–12	Megyei Bajnokság I	27	0	—		—		27	0
Szepetnek	2012–13	Megyei Bajnokság I	24	0	—		—		24	0
Szepetnek	2013–14	Megyei Bajnokság I	13	0	—		—		13	0
Szepetnek	2014–15	Megyei Bajnokság I	13	0	—		—		13	0
Szepetnek	Total		77	0	—		—		77	0
Career total			423	14	18	0	2	0	443	14

== Honours ==
Nagykanizsa

- Nemzeti Bajnokság II – West: 1993–94
