= Gyula Horváth =

Hungarian footballer (born 1975)

Personal information
- Date of birth: 4 August 1975 (age 51)
- Place of birth: Körmend, Hungary
- Height: 1.85 m (6 ft 1 in)
- Position: Striker

Senior career*
Years	Team	Apps	(Gls)
–1996	Körmend	42	(16)
1996–1997	Zalaegerszeg	9	(1)
1997–2000	Nagykanizsa	94	(37)
2000	Kispest-Honvéd	27	(7)
2000–2004	Pécs	100	(32)
2004	Xi'an Anxinyuan	11	
2004–2006	Pécs	39	(9)
2006–2008	Kaposvölgye	56	(19)
2008	→ Pogány (loan)	13	(14)
2008–2009	KA		
2009	Hévíz	15	(14)
2009–2011	Kaposvölgye	24	(7)
2010–2011	→ Hévíz (loan)	30	(12)
2011–2012	Hévíz	21	(8)
2011–2012	Hévíz II	3	(0)
Total		484	(176)
- * Club domestic league appearances and goals

Gyula Horváth (born 4 August 1975) is a Hungarian former professional footballer who played as a striker.

== Career ==
=== Xi'an Anxinyuan ===
In March 2004, he joined Chinese second-tier club Xi'an Anxinyuan from Pécs, where he made 11 appearances during the 2004 season. The contract was terminated by mutual agreement in early July, leaving him a free agent until 30 November.

== Career statistics ==
Appearances and goals by club, season and competition
Club	Season	League			National cup (Note: Includes Magyar Kupa)		Other		Total	
Club	Season	Division	Apps	Goals	Apps	Goals	Apps	Goals	Apps	Goals
Körmend	1993–94	Nemzeti Bajnokság III			1	1	—		1	1
Körmend	1994–95	Nemzeti Bajnokság III	29	5	—		—		29	5
Körmend	1995–96	Nemzeti Bajnokság III	13	11	—		—		13	11
Körmend	Total		42	16	1	1	—		43	17
Zalaegerszeg	1995–96	Nemzeti Bajnokság I	6	1	2	0	—		8	1
Zalaegerszeg	1996–97	Nemzeti Bajnokság I	3	0	5	2	—		8	2
Zalaegerszeg	Total		9	1	7	2	—		16	3
Nagykanizsa	1996–97	Nemzeti Bajnokság II	9	2	—		—		9	2
Nagykanizsa	1997–98	Nemzeti Bajnokság II	32	13	1	0	—		33	13
Nagykanizsa	1998–99	Nemzeti Bajnokság II	38	17	—		—		38	17
Nagykanizsa	1999–2000	Nemzeti Bajnokság I	15	5	—		—		15	5
Nagykanizsa	Total		94	37	1	0	—		95	37
Kispest-Honvéd	1999–2000	Nemzeti Bajnokság I	16	6	—		—		16	6
Kispest-Honvéd	2000–01	Nemzeti Bajnokság I	11	1	3	1	—		14	2
Kispest-Honvéd	Total		27	7	3	1	—		30	8
Pécs	2000–01	Nemzeti Bajnokság II	22	5	—		—		22	5
Pécs	2001–02	Nemzeti Bajnokság II	30	8	1	1	—		31	9
Pécs	2002–03	Nemzeti Bajnokság II	34	14	1	1	—		35	15
Pécs	2003–04	Nemzeti Bajnokság I	14	5	3	0	—		17	5
Pécs	Total		100	32	5	2	—		105	34
Xi'an Anxinyuan	2004	China League One					—			
Pécs	2004–05	Nemzeti Bajnokság I	29	8	2	0	—		31	8
Pécs	2005–06	Nemzeti Bajnokság I	10	1	4	2	—		14	3
Pécs	Total		39	9	6	2	—		45	11
Kaposvölgye	2005–06	Nemzeti Bajnokság II	15	6	—		—		15	6
Kaposvölgye	2006–07	Nemzeti Bajnokság II	27	8	1	1	—		28	9
Kaposvölgye	2007–08	Nemzeti Bajnokság II	14	5	4	1	—		18	6
Kaposvölgye	Total		56	19	5	2	—		61	21
Pogány (loan)	2007–08	Megyei Bajnokság I	13	14	—		—		13	14
KA	2008	1. deild karla					—			
Hévíz	2008–09	Nemzeti Bajnokság III	15	14	—		0	0	15	14
Kaposvölgye	2009–10	Nemzeti Bajnokság II	24	7	4	2	—		28	9
Hévíz (loan)	2010–11	Nemzeti Bajnokság III	30	12	1	0	3 (Note: Appearances in Magyar Kupa qualifying rounds)	4	34	16
Hévíz	2011–12	Nemzeti Bajnokság III	21	8	—		—		21	8
Hévíz II	2011–12	Megyei Bajnokság III	3	0	—		—		3	0
Career total			484	176	33	12	3	4	520	192

== Honours ==
Körmend

- Nemzeti Bajnokság III – Bakony: 1995–96

Pécs

- Nemzeti Bajnokság II: 2002–03

Pogány

- Megyei Bajnokság I – Baranya: 2007–08

Hévíz

- Nemzeti Bajnokság III – Bakony: 2008–09

Hévíz II

- Megyei Bajnokság III – Zala East group: 2011–12
