= László Kovács (footballer, born 1967) =

Hungarian footballer

Personal information
- Date of birth: 25 July 1967 (age 59)
- Place of birth: Zalaegerszeg, Hungary
- Height: 1.82 m (6 ft 0 in)
- Position: Midfielder

Senior career*
Years	Team	Apps	(Gls)
1987–1993	Zalaegerszeg	85	(8)
1993–1997	Soproni FAC	87	(2)
1997–2001	Nagykanizsa	82	(4)
2001–2003	Keszthely		
2003–2006	Ságod		
2006–2018	Felsőrajk	47	(3)
Total		301	(17)

Managerial career
- 2016–2018: Sárvár
- * Club domestic league appearances and goals

László Kovács (born 25 July 1967) is a Hungarian football manager and former professional player who played as a midfielder.

== Managerial career ==
On 1 September 2016, Kovács took charge of Nemzeti Bajnokság III club Sárvár. On 14 May 2018, the club were crowned champions of the Vas Megyei Bajnokság I following a 3–1 away victory against Egyházasrádóc. In the Megyei Bajnokság I promotion play-offs, Sárvár defeated Rákospalota 1–0 after extra time, securing promotion to the NB III with a 1–0 aggregate victory. On 25 September, the club terminated Kovács's contract by mutual consent.

== Career statistics ==
=== Club ===
Appearances and goals by club, season and competition
Club	Season	League			Magyar Kupa		Total	
Club	Season	Division	Apps	Goals	Apps	Goals	Apps	Goals
Zalaegerszeg	1987–88	Nemzeti Bajnokság I	8	0			8	0
Zalaegerszeg	1988–89	Nemzeti Bajnokság I	23	1			23	1
Zalaegerszeg	1991–92	Nemzeti Bajnokság I	25	2			25	2
Zalaegerszeg	1992–93	Nemzeti Bajnokság II	29	5	1	0	30	5
Zalaegerszeg	Total		85	8	1	0	86	8
Soproni FAC	1993–94	Nemzeti Bajnokság I	23	2	2	0	25	2
Soproni FAC	1994–95	Nemzeti Bajnokság I	13	0	3	0	16	0
Soproni FAC	1995–96	Nemzeti Bajnokság II	25	0	5	0	30	0
Soproni FAC	1996–97	Nemzeti Bajnokság II	26	0	4	1	30	1
Soproni FAC	Total		87	2	14	1	101	3
Nagykanizsa	1997–98	Nemzeti Bajnokság II	28	3	2	0	30	3
Nagykanizsa	1998–99	Nemzeti Bajnokság II	19	1	—		19	1
Nagykanizsa	1999–2000	Nemzeti Bajnokság I	21	0	—		21	0
Nagykanizsa	2000–01	Nemzeti Bajnokság I	12	0	1	0	15	0
Nagykanizsa	2000–01	Nemzeti Bajnokság II	2	0	1	0	15	0
Nagykanizsa	Total		82	4	3	0	85	4
Felsőrajk	2010–11	Megyei Bajnokság II	16	3	—		16	3
Felsőrajk	2011–12	Megyei Bajnokság II	10	0	—		10	0
Felsőrajk	2012–13	Megyei Bajnokság II	1	0	—		1	0
Felsőrajk	2013–14	Megyei Bajnokság II	1	0	—		1	0
Felsőrajk	2014–15	Megyei Bajnokság II	6	0	—		6	0
Felsőrajk	2015–16	Megyei Bajnokság II	10	0	—		10	0
Felsőrajk	2016–17	Megyei Bajnokság II	2	0	—		2	0
Felsőrajk	2018–19	Megyei Bajnokság II	1	0	—		1	0
Felsőrajk	Total		47	3	—		47	3
Career total			301	17	18	1	319	18

== Honours ==
=== Manager ===
Sárvár

- Megyei Bajnokság I – Vas: 2017–18
