= Godian Ofoegbu =

Nigerian footballer (born 1975)

Personal information
- Full name: Godian Ugochukwu Ofoegbu
- Date of birth: 8 August 1975 (age 51)
- Height: 1.75 m (5 ft 9 in)
- Position: Striker

Senior career*
Years	Team	Apps	(Gls)
–1995	Iwuanyanwu Nationale		
1995–1996	Kistarcsa	27	(5)
1996–2002	Nagykanizsa	153	(20)
2002–2003	Pápa	14	(2)
2003–2006	Mosonmagyaróvár	80	(9)
2006–2008	Rajka	9	(8)
2008	Jánossomorja	9	(0)
Total		292	(44)
- * Club domestic league appearances and goals

Godian Ugochukwu Ofoegbu (born 8 August 1975) is a Nigerian former professional footballer who played as a striker.

== Career ==
In August 1996, it was reported that Ofoegbu had reached an agreement on a contract with Hungarian Nemzeti Bajnokság II club Nagykanizsa.

== Career statistics ==
Appearances and goals by club, season and competition
Club	Season	League			National cup (Note: Includes Magyar Kupa)		Other		Total	
Club	Season	Division	Apps	Goals	Apps	Goals	Apps	Goals	Apps	Goals
Kistarcsa	1995–96	Nemzeti Bajnokság III	27	5	—		—		27	5
Nagykanizsa	1996–97	Nemzeti Bajnokság II	29	9	—		—		29	9
Nagykanizsa	1997–98	Nemzeti Bajnokság II	31	5	4	0	—		35	5
Nagykanizsa	1998–99	Nemzeti Bajnokság II	29	4	—		—		29	4
Nagykanizsa	1999–2000	Nemzeti Bajnokság I	24	2	—		—		24	2
Nagykanizsa	2000–01	Nemzeti Bajnokság I	10	0	1	1	2 (Note: Appearances in Nemzeti Bajnokság II relegation play-offs)	0	32	1
Nagykanizsa	2000–01	Nemzeti Bajnokság II	19	0	1	1	2	0	32	1
Nagykanizsa	2001–02	Nemzeti Bajnokság II	11	0	2	0	—		13	0
Nagykanizsa	Total		153	20	7	1	2	0	162	21
Pápa	2001–02	Nemzeti Bajnokság II	9	2	—		—		9	2
Pápa	2002–03	Nemzeti Bajnokság II	5	0	2	1	—		7	1
Pápa	Total		14	2	2	1	—		16	3
Mosonmagyaróvár	2002–03	Nemzeti Bajnokság III	15	5	—		—		15	5
Mosonmagyaróvár	2003–04	Nemzeti Bajnokság III	30	3	—		—		30	3
Mosonmagyaróvár	2004–05	Nemzeti Bajnokság II	18	0	—		—		18	0
Mosonmagyaróvár	2005–06	Nemzeti Bajnokság II	17	1	2	2	—		19	3
Mosonmagyaróvár	Total		80	9	2	2	—		82	11
Rajka	2006–07	Megyei Bajnokság II	9	8	—		—		9	8
Jánossomorja	2008–09	Megyei Bajnokság I	9	0	—		—		9	0
Career total			292	44	11	4	2	0	305	48

== Honours ==
Mosonmagyaróvár

- Nemzeti Bajnokság III – West: 2003–04
