= Sabahudin Agić =

Bosnian footballer (born 1969)

Personal information
- Full name: Sabahudin Mustafa Agić
- Date of birth: 25 July 1969 (age 57)
- Height: 1.86 m (6 ft 1 in)
- Position: Defender

Senior career*
Years	Team	Apps	(Gls)
- Borac Banja Luka
- Čoka
1994–1995	Nagykanizsa	27	(1)
1995–1996	Győr	25	(0)
1996–2002	Nagykanizsa	148	(11)
2002	Kraljevcan 38		
2002–2003	Nagyatád	12	(1)
Total		212	(13)
- * Club domestic league appearances and goals

Sabahudin Mustafa Agić (born 25 July 1969) is a Bosnian former professional footballer who played as a defender.

== Career ==
On 19 July 1995, Agić signed a one-year contract with Nemzeti Bajnokság I club Győr.

== Career statistics ==
Appearances and goals by club, season and competition
Club	Season	League			National cup (Note: Includes Magyar Kupa)		Total	
Club	Season	Division	Apps	Goals	Apps	Goals	Apps	Goals
Nagykanizsa	1994–95	Nemzeti Bajnokság I	27	1	—		27	1
Győr	1995–96	Nemzeti Bajnokság I	25	0	3	0	28	0
Nagykanizsa	1996–97	Nemzeti Bajnokság II	22	2	—		22	2
Nagykanizsa	1997–98	Nemzeti Bajnokság II	36	1	2	0	38	1
Nagykanizsa	1998–99	Nemzeti Bajnokság II	35	6	—		35	6
Nagykanizsa	1999–2000	Nemzeti Bajnokság I	33	2	—		33	2
Nagykanizsa	2000–01	Nemzeti Bajnokság I	2	0	1	0	8	0
Nagykanizsa	2000–01	Nemzeti Bajnokság II	5	0	1	0	8	0
Nagykanizsa	2001–02	Nemzeti Bajnokság II	15	0	2	0	17	0
Nagykanizsa	Total		148	11	5	0	153	11
Nagyatád	2002–03	Nemzeti Bajnokság III	12	1	1	0	13	1
Career total			212	13	9	0	221	13
