= Árpád Kovácsevics =

Hungarian footballer (born 1968)

Personal information
- Date of birth: 4 October 1968 (age 58)
- Place of birth: Pécs, Hungary
- Height: 1.85 m (6 ft 1 in)
- Position: Goalkeeper

Senior career*
Years	Team	Apps	(Gls)
–1993	Pécs	25	(0)
1993–1994	Kiskőrös	12	(0)
1994–1995	Mohácsi FC	41	(0)
1995–1996	Pécs	18	(0)
1996–1998	Paksi ASE	66	(0)
1998–1999	Dunaferr	15	(0)
1999–2000	Nagykanizsa	17	(0)
2000	Paksi SE	2	(0)
2000–2001	Abony	16	(0)
2001–2002	Mohácsi TE	20	(0)
2002–2004	Barcs	28	(0)
2004–2005	Beremend		
2005–2006	Mohácsi TE	4	(0)
2006–2007	Bogád		
2007–2008	Komló	27	(0)
2008–2009	Beremend		
2009–2011	Pogány	34	(0)
2010–2011	→ Híd (loan)	16	(0)
Total		341	(0)
- * Club domestic league appearances and goals

Árpád Kovácsevics (born 4 October 1968) is a Hungarian former professional footballer who played as a goalkeeper.

== Career ==
Kovácsevics won the Nemzeti Bajnokság II East group with Kiskőrös in the 1993–94 season, securing promotion to the top flight, making 12 appearances in the first half of the campaign before transferring to Mohácsi FC during the second half of the season.

== Career statistics ==
Appearances and goals by club, season and competition
Club	Season	League			Magyar Kupa		Total	
Club	Season	Division	Apps	Goals	Apps	Goals	Apps	Goals
Pécs	1989–90	Nemzeti Bajnokság I	3	0			3	0
Pécs	1990–91	Nemzeti Bajnokság I	4	0			4	0
Pécs	1991–92	Nemzeti Bajnokság I	18	0			18	0
Pécs	Total		25	0			25	0
Kiskőrös	1993–94	Nemzeti Bajnokság II	12	0	1	0	13	0
Mohácsi FC	1993–94	Nemzeti Bajnokság II	13	0	—		13	0
Mohácsi FC	1994–95	Nemzeti Bajnokság II	28	0	—		28	0
Mohácsi FC	Total		41	0	—		41	0
Pécs	1995–96	Nemzeti Bajnokság I	18	0	4	0	22	0
Paksi ASE	1996–97	Nemzeti Bajnokság II	30	0	3	0	33	0
Paksi ASE	1997–98	Nemzeti Bajnokság II	36	0	2	0	38	0
Paksi ASE	Total		66	0	5	0	71	0
Dunaferr	1998–99	Nemzeti Bajnokság I	15	0	3	0	18	0
Nagykanizsa	1999–2000	Nemzeti Bajnokság I	17	0	—		17	0
Paksi SE	1999–2000	Nemzeti Bajnokság III	2	0	—		2	0
Abony	2000–01	Nemzeti Bajnokság III	16	0	—		16	0
Mohácsi TE	2001–02	Nemzeti Bajnokság III	20	0	—		20	0
Barcs	2002–03	Nemzeti Bajnokság III	28	0	1	0	29	0
Barcs	2003–04	Nemzeti Bajnokság III			3	0	3	0
Barcs	Total		28	0	4	0	32	0
Mohácsi TE	2005–06	Nemzeti Bajnokság III	4	0	—		4	0
Komló	2007–08	Nemzeti Bajnokság II	27	0	1	0	28	0
Pogány	2008–09	Megyei Bajnokság I	15	0	—		15	0
Pogány	2009–10	Nemzeti Bajnokság III	19	0	1	0	20	0
Pogány	Total		34	0	1	0	35	0
Híd (loan)	2010–11	Megyei Bajnokság I	16	0	—		16	0
Career total			341	0	19	0	360	0

== Honours ==
Kiskőrös

- Nemzeti Bajnokság II – East: 1993–94

Barcs

- Nemzeti Bajnokság III – Dráva: 2002–03
