= 1999–2000 Nagykanizsa FC season =

Nagykanizsa
1999–2000 season
- Manager: Ferenc Keszei (until 10 January 2000); Lajos Németh (from 13 January 2000)
- Stadium: Olajbányász Stadion
- Nemzeti Bajnokság I: 14th
- Top goalscorer: League: Gyula Horváth (5); All: Gyula Horváth (5)
- Highest home attendance: 12,000 v Zalaegerszeg (8 August 1999, Nemzeti Bajnokság I)
- Lowest home attendance: 2,500 (multiple Nemzeti Bajnokság I matches)
- Average home league attendance: 4,688
- Biggest win: 4–1 v Vasas (Away, 20 May 2000, Nemzeti Bajnokság I)
- Biggest defeat: 0–4 v Győr (Away, 15 April 2000, Nemzeti Bajnokság I)

The 1999–2000 was Nagykanizsa Futball Club's 3rd competitive season, 56th season in existence as a football club and first season in the Nemzeti Bajnokság I after finishing second in the second division in the previous season.

== Squad ==
Note: Flags indicate national team as defined under FIFA eligibility rules; some limited exceptions apply. Players may hold more than one non-FIFA nationality.

No.	Pos.	Nation	Player
—	GK	HUN	Csaba Gelencsér
—	GK	HUN	Gábor Horváth
—	GK	HUN	Árpád Kovácsevics
–	DF	BIH	Sabahudin Agić
–	DF	HUN	Zoltán Balog
–	DF	YUG	Dragan Crnomarković
–	DF	HUN	Szabolcs Kenéz
–	DF	HUN	István Kiss
–	DF	HUN	László Kónya
–	DF	HUN	Róbert Pálfi
–	MF	HUN	Gergely Panghy
–	MF	HUN	Attila Balogh
–	MF	HUN	József Farkas
–	MF	HUN	Viktor Himics

No.	Pos.	Nation	Player
–	MF	HUN	Zoltán Horváth
–	MF	HUN	László Kovács
–	MF	YUG	Dejan Marinković
–	MF	HUN	Géza Pulai
–	MF	HUN	László Svélecz
–	MF	HUN	László Visnovics
–	FW	HUN	Krisztián Zahorecz
–	FW	HUN	Norbert Borda
–	FW	NGA	Godian Ofoegbu
–	FW	HUN	Gyula Horváth
–	FW	YUG	Zsombor Kerekes
–	FW	HUN	Gábor Papp
–	FW	HUN	Csaba Szőcse

== Competitions ==
=== Overview ===
Competition	First match	Last match	Starting round	Final position	Record							
Competition	First match	Last match	Starting round	Final position	Pld	W	D	L	GF	GA	GD	Win %
Nemzeti Bajnokság I	8 August 1999	27 May 2000	Matchday 1	14th	32	7	10	15	27	44	−17	21.88
Total					32	7	10	15	27	44	−17	21.88

Source: Competitions

=== Nemzeti Bajnokság I ===
==== League table ====
Pos	Team	Pld	W	D	L	GF	GA	GD	Pts	Qualification or relegation
12	Kispest Honvéd	32	10	9	13	27	39	−12	39	
13	Haladás	32	8	8	16	37	53	−16	32	
14	Nagykanizsa	32	7	10	15	27	44	−17	31	
15	Siófok (R)	32	7	7	18	26	51	−25	28	Relegation to Nemzeti Bajnokság II
16	Diósgyőr (R)	32	5	9	18	26	56	−30	24	Relegation to Nemzeti Bajnokság II

Source: rsssf.com
(R) Relegated

==== Results summary ====
Overall								Home						Away					
Pld	W	D	L	GF	GA	GD	Pts	W	D	L	GF	GA	GD	W	D	L	GF	GA	GD
32	7	10	15	27	44	−17	31	5	7	4	15	13	+2	2	3	11	12	31	−19

==== Results by round ====
Round	1	2	3	4	5	6	7	8	9	10	11	12	13	14	15	16	17	18	19	20	21	22	23	24	25	26	27	28	29	30	31	32	33	34
Ground	H	A	H	A	H	A	H	A	H	H	A	H	A	H	A	H	A	A	H	A	H	A	H	A	H	A	A	H	A	H	A	H	A	H
Result	D	W	D	L	W	D	D	L	D	W	L	L	D	V	L	L	L	D	W	L	L	L	W	L	D	L	L	W	L	L	V	D	W	D
Position	12	6	7	8	8	8	9	12	12	8	10	13	12	14	14	15	15	15	14	15	14	14	13	13	13	13	13	13	14	14	14	14	13	14
Points	1	4	5	5	8	9	10	10	11	14	14	14	15	15	15	15	15	16	19	19	19	19	22	22	23	23	23	26	26	26	26	27	30	31

A = Away; H = Home; W = Win; D = Draw; L = Loss; V = Void

==== Matches ====
8 August 1999 1	Nagykanizsa	0–0	Zalaegerszeg	Nagykanizsa
17:00 CEST (UTC+2)	Agić (yellow card) 42'	Report	Filó (yellow card) 82'	Stadium: Olajbányász Stadion; Attendance: 12,000; Referee: Zoltán Szarka; Assistant referees: Boda, Dr. P. Szabó

14 August 1999 2	Vác	3–4	Nagykanizsa	Vác
19:00 CEST (UTC+2)	Kasza 33'; Rob 44', 84'; T. Nagy (yellow card) 87'	Report	Gy. Horváth 37', 75'; Z. Horváth 64'; Panghy 77'	Stadium: Ligeti Stadion; Attendance: 2,000; Referee: Viktor Kassai; Assistant referees: Tompos, Répássy

20 August 1999 3	Nagykanizsa	1–1	MTK	Nagykanizsa
17:00 CEST (UTC+2)	Zahorecz (yellow card) 13'; Gy. Horváth 39'; Panghy (yellow card) 58'	Report	Szamosi (yellow card) 16'; Illés 37'; Helder (yellow card) 72'; Komlósi (yellow card) 79'	Stadium: Olajbányász Stadion; Attendance: 8,000; Referee: Béla Kiss; Assistant referees: Mező, Puskás

28 August 1999 4	Dunaferr	2–1	Nagykanizsa	Dunaújváros
17:00 CEST (UTC+2)	Tököli 66'; Nychenko 70'	Report	Kerekes (yellow card) 60'; Gy. Horváth 63'	Stadium: Dunaújvárosi Stadion; Attendance: 2,000; Referee: Attila Juhos; Assistant referees: Hrabovszky, Georgiu

12 September 1999 5	Nagykanizsa	1–0	Nyírség-Spartacus	Nagykanizsa
16:30 CEST (UTC+2)	Panghy (yellow card) 48'; Crnomarković (yellow card) 62'; Gy. Horváth 73'	Report	Dican (yellow card) 4'; Novák (yellow card) 15'	Stadium: Olajbányász Stadion; Attendance: 5,000; Referee: Tamás Arany; Assistant referees: Mező, Puskás

18 September 1999 6	Diósgyőr	1–1	Nagykanizsa	Miskolc
16:00 CEST (UTC+2)	Radu (yellow card) 25'; Timko 73'; Kunzo (yellow card) 77'; Raican (yellow card) 84'	Report	Zahorecz 5'; Marinković (yellow card) 29'; Panghy (yellow card) 85'	Stadium: Diósgyőri Stadion; Attendance: 3,500; Referee: Zsolt Szabó; Assistant referees: Nyilas, Z. Szabó

24 September 1999 7	Nagykanizsa	1–1	Debrecen	Nagykanizsa
16:00 CEST (UTC+2)	Kerekes 35', (yellow card) 36'; Pálfi (yellow card) 55'	Report	Goian (yellow card) 15'; Bernáth (yellow card) 57'; Siklósi 72'; Böőr (yellow card) 81'	Stadium: Olajbányász Stadion; Attendance: 4,000; Referee: Viktor Kassai; Assistant referees: Dr. Répássy, I. Horváth

1 October 1999 8	Újpest	3–1	Nagykanizsa	Budapest
20:00 CEST (UTC+2)	Tamási 17'; Kopunović 21' (pen.); Csillag (yellow card) 73'; Terjék 79'	Report	Svélecz 11'; Kovácsevics (yellow card) 21'; Pálfi (yellow card) 23'; Panghy (yellow card) 60'	Stadium: Megyeri úti stadion Attendance: 3,000; Referee: Tamás Arany; Assistant referees: Radvánszky, László

17 October 1999 9	Nagykanizsa	0–0	Tatabánya	Nagykanizsa
14:30 CEST (UTC+2)	Zahorecz (yellow card) 66'; Kerekes (yellow card) 75'	Report		Stadium: Olajbányász Stadion; Attendance: 4,000; Referee: Ferenc Bede; Assistant referees: Vámos, Georgiu

24 October 1999 10	Nagykanizsa	2–0	Győr	Nagykanizsa
14:30 CEST (UTC+2)	Pálfi (yellow card) 48'; Crnomarković 52'; Marinković 66'	Report	L. Nagy (yellow card) 37'; Posza (yellow card) 39'; Csiszár (yellow card) 53'; Győri (yellow card) 76'	Stadium: Olajbányász Stadion; Attendance: 4,000; Referee: János Megyebíró; Assistant referees: Kassai, Dr. Répássy

30 October 1999 11	Siófok	2–0	Nagykanizsa	Siófok
14:30 CEST (UTC+2)	Zabundu 20'; Juhász (yellow card) 24'; Grósz (red card) 33'; Bé. Kovács (yellow card) 44', (goal) 54' (pen.); Pest (yellow card) 90'	Report	Agić (yellow card) 54'; Gy. Horváth (red card) 90+2'	Stadium: Révész Géza utcai Stadion; Attendance: 1,500; Referee: Attila Dubraviczky; Assistant referees: Cserna, Tamássy

7 November 1999 12	Nagykanizsa	0–2	Ferencváros	Nagykanizsa
13:00 CET (UTC+1)	Farkas (yellow card) 17'	Report	P. Horváth 6'; Bócz (yellow card) 41'; Bárányos 90+2'	Stadium: Olajbányász Stadion; Attendance: 10,000; Referee: Attila Ábrahám; Assistant referees: Balajti, Georgiu

12 November 1999 13	Kispest-Honvéd	0–0	Nagykanizsa	Budapest
18:00 CET (UTC+1)	Borgulya (yellow card) 61'	Report	Crnomarković (yellow card) 40'; Z. Horváth (yellow card) 42'	Stadium: Bozsik József Stadion; Attendance: 1,500; Referee: Csaba Sápi; Assistant referees: J. Szabó, Koch

27 November 1999 15	Haladás	2–0	Nagykanizsa	Szombathely
17:00 CET (UTC+1)	Balassa 68', (yellow card) 68'; I. Balogh 76', (yellow card) 79'; B. Takács (yellow card) 78'	Report	Kerekes (yellow card) 44'; Pálfi (yellow card) 60'	Stadium: Rohonci út Attendance: 1,300; Referee: Attila Hanacsek; Assistant referees: Dubraviczky, P. Kovács

1 December 1999 14	Nagykanizsa	1–2	Szeged	Nagykanizsa
13:00 CET (UTC+1)	Agić 55' (pen.)	Report	Bašić (yellow card) 5'; Faragó 14'; Kurucsai (yellow card) 88'; Eremeev 90+2'	Stadium: Olajbányász Stadion; Attendance: 1,500; Referee: Viktor Kassai; Assistant referees: Makai, I. Horváth
Note: On 14 March 2000, the Disciplinary Committee of the HFF expelled Szeged from the league, and in accordance with the regulations, all results previously achieved by the Szeged team were annulled.

5 December 1999 16	Nagykanizsa	1–2	Vasas	Nagykanizsa
13:00 CET (UTC+1)	Pálfi (yellow card) 31'; Kerekes 69'; Kenéz (yellow card) 90'	Report	A. Tóth (yellow card) 6'; Aranyos (yellow card) 19'; Szili 55'; Szilveszter (yellow card) 80'; Tiber 86'	Stadium: Olajbányász Stadion; Attendance: 3,000; Referee: László Cserna; Assistant referees: J. Szabó, Mező

13 December 1999 17	Gázszer	1–0	Nagykanizsa	Székesfehérvár
19:00 CET (UTC+1)	Dulić 65'; Schindler (yellow card) 76'	Report	Gy. Horváth (yellow card) 55'	Stadium: Sóstói Stadion; Attendance: 300; Referee: Géza Kiss; Assistant referees: Tumó, Egedy

26 February 2000 18	Zalaegerszeg	0–0	Nagykanizsa	Zalaegerszeg
15:00 CET (UTC+1)	Filó (yellow card) 43'; Kocsárdi (yellow card) 74'	Report	L. Kovács (yellow card) 44'; Kónya (yellow card) 54'	Stadium: ZTE Stadion; Attendance: 12,000; Referee: Attila Hanacsek; Assistant referees: P. Kovács, Egedy

5 March 2000 19	Nagykanizsa	3–1	Vác	Nagykanizsa
14:30 CET (UTC+1)	Azoiței 36'; Zo. Szabó 52'; A. Balogh (yellow card) 75'; Szalai 85'	Report	Sováb 12', (yellow card) 23'; Koller (yellow card) 32'; Bucsi (yellow card) 63'	Stadium: Olajbányász Stadion; Attendance: 3,500; Referee: András Sóthy; Assistant referees: Makai, I. Molnár

8 March 2000 20	MTK	3–1	Nagykanizsa	Budapest
17:00 CET (UTC+1)	Kenesei 18'; Gușatu 26'; Elek 81'	Report	Popovics 60'; Kónya (yellow card) 78'	Stadium: Hungária körúti Stadion; Attendance: 2,500; Referee: Zsolt Szabó; Assistant referees: Vámos, Radvánszky

12 March 2000 21	Nagykanizsa	0–1	Dunaferr	Nagykanizsa
14:30 CET (UTC+1)		Report	Orosz 44'	Stadium: Olajbányász Stadion; Attendance: 4,000; Referee: Attila Ábrahám; Assistant referees: J. Molnár, Balajti

18 March 2000 22	Nyírség-Spartacus	2–0	Nagykanizsa	Nyíregyháza
15:00 CET (UTC+1)	Szatke 53'; Cherniyenko 84'	Report	Kónya (red card) 75'	Stadium: Városi Stadion; Attendance: 2,500; Referee: Sándor Puhl; Assistant referees: Hanyecz, Hrabovszky

25 March 2000 23	Nagykanizsa	2–1	Diósgyőr	Nagykanizsa
15:00 CET (UTC+1)	Farkas (yellow card) 9'; Agić 40'; Papp 86'; Svélecz (yellow card) 90'	Report	Lipták (yellow card) 16'; Kunzo (yellow card) 40'; Raican (yellow card) 45'; Kákóczki (yellow card) 65'; Hompoth (yellow card) 68'; Radu 89'	Stadium: Olajbányász Stadion; Attendance: 2,500; Referee: József Szabó; Assistant referees: B. Kiss, Kispál

1 April 2000 24	Debrecen	3–0	Nagykanizsa	Debrecen
16:30 CEST (UTC+2)	Kerekes 20', 29', 75'; Vadicska (yellow card) 63'	Report	Szalai (yellow card) 27' (yellow-red card) 41'; Farkas (yellow card) 39'; Visnovics (yellow card) 70'	Stadium: Oláh Gábor utcai Stadion; Attendance: 2,500; Referee: István Hanyecz; Assistant referees: Hrabovszky, Bócsik

5 April 2000 25	Nagykanizsa	1–1	Újpest	Nagykanizsa
16:30 CEST (UTC+2)	Visnovics (yellow card) 9'; Gá. Horváth 55'; Purt (yellow card) 76'	Report	N. Tóth 60'; Ba. Kovács (yellow card) 80'; Kiskapusi (yellow card) 90+1'	Stadium: Olajbányász Stadion; Attendance: 3,000; Referee: Zoltán Szarka; Assistant referees: Boda, Dr. Szabó

8 April 2000 26	Tatabánya	1–0	Nagykanizsa	Tatabánya
16:30 CEST (UTC+2)	Gonçalves (yellow card) 54'; Vincze 74'	Report		Stadium: Városi Stadion; Attendance: 4,000; Referee: János Megyebíró; Assistant referees: Sóthy, Mező

15 April 2000 27	Győr	4–0	Nagykanizsa	Győr
19:00 CEST (UTC+2)	Herczeg 35'; Ferenczi 36'; Baumgartner 40'; L. Nagy 80'	Report	Zo. Szabó (yellow card) 11'	Stadium: Stadion ETO; Attendance: 2,500; Referee: Béla Kiss; Assistant referees: Koch, Székely

23 April 2000 28	Nagykanizsa	1–0	Siófok	Nagykanizsa
17:00 CEST (UTC+2)	Zo. Szabó 13'; Azoiței (yellow card) 30'; Pálfi (yellow card) 65'; Mikler (yellow card) 70'; Svélecz (yellow card) 80'	Report	Juhász (yellow card) 45'	Stadium: Olajbányász Stadion; Attendance: 3,500; Referee: Zsolt Szabó; Assistant referees: T. Vámos, Gy. Kiss

29 April 2000 29	Ferencváros	3–0	Nagykanizsa	Budapest
17:00 CEST (UTC+2)	Bárányos 13'; M. Tóth 45', 80'	Report		Stadium: Üllői úti Stadion; Attendance: 2,500; Referee: Sándor Puhl; Assistant referees: Sápi, Tumó

7 May 2000 30	Nagykanizsa	0–1	Kispest-Honvéd	Nagykanizsa
17:00 CEST (UTC+2)	Svélecz (yellow card) 34'	Report	Dubecz (yellow card) 14'; Gy. Horváth 34'; T. Szabó (yellow card) 61'; Fehér (yellow card) 90'	Stadium: Olajbányász Stadion; Attendance: 3,500; Referee: Béla Kiss; Assistant referees: Dubraviczky, Tompos

13 May 2000 31	Szeged	–	Nagykanizsa	Szeged
				Stadium: Felső Tisza-parti Stadion
Note: On 14 March 2000, the Disciplinary Committee of the HFF expelled Szeged from the league, and as a result, Szeged's scheduled opponents in the remaining rounds were awarded byes.

17 May 2000 32	Nagykanizsa	1–1	Haladás	Nagykanizsa
17:00 CEST (UTC+2)	Szalai (yellow card) 26'; Ofoegbu 83'	Report	Némethy 45'; A. Horváth (yellow card) 61'	Stadium: Olajbányász Stadion; Attendance: 2,500; Referee: Attila Juhos; Assistant referees: Ring, Kispál

20 May 2000 33	Vasas	1–4	Nagykanizsa	Budapest
17:00 CEST (UTC+2)	Galaschek (yellow card) 72'; Kabát 73'	Report	Ofoegbu 14'; Zo. Szabó 20'; Farkas 26'; Pálfi (yellow card) 51'; Popovics 74'	Stadium: Fáy utcai Stadion; Attendance: 2,000; Referee: József Szabó; Assistant referees: Sápi, Tompos

27 May 2000 34	Nagykanizsa	1–1	Pécs	Nagykanizsa
17:00 CEST (UTC+2)	Zo. Szabó 5'; Pálfi (yellow card) 17'	Report	Kutas (yellow card) 20'; Földvári (yellow card) 64'; Toldi (red card) 64'; Gera 90+1'	Stadium: Olajbányász Stadion; Attendance: 2,500; Referee: János Makai; Assistant referees: Arany, Mező

== Statistics ==
=== Overall ===
Appearances (Apps) numbers are for appearances in competitive games only, including sub appearances.

Player	Pos.	Nemzeti Bajnokság I			
Player	Pos.	Apps	Goal	Booked	Sent off (straight red)
(Bosnia and Herzegovina) Sabahudin Agić	DF	33	2	2	
(Romania) Cătălin Azoiței	FW	8	1	1	
(Hungary) Attila Balogh	MF	9		1	
(Socialist Federal Republic of Yugoslavia) Dragan Crnomarković	DF	17	1	2	
(Hungary) Gábor Horváth	FW	7	1		
(Hungary) József Farkas	MF	27	1	3	
(Hungary) Csaba Gelencsér	GK	10			
(Nigeria) Godian Ofoegbu	FW	24	2		
(Hungary) Viktor Himics	MF	2			
(Hungary) Gyula Horváth	FW	15	5	1	1
(Hungary) Zoltán Horváth	MF	11	1	1	
(Hungary) Szabolcs Kenéz	DF	6		1	
(Socialist Federal Republic of Yugoslavia) Zsombor Kerekes	FW	16	2	4	
(Hungary) István Kiss	DF	9			
(Hungary) László Kónya	DF	21		2	1
(Hungary) László Kovács	MF	21		1	
(Hungary) Zoltán Kovács	GK	7			
(Hungary) Árpád Kovácsevics	GK	17		1	
(Hungary) István Lukács	MF	1			
(Socialist Federal Republic of Yugoslavia) Dejan Marinković	MF	14	1	1	
(Hungary) Lajos Mikler	MF	15		1	
(Hungary) Róbert Pálfi	DF	31		8	
(Hungary) Gergely Panghy	DF	10	1	4	
(Hungary) Gábor Papp	FW	5	1		
(Hungary) László Pongrácz	MF	2			
(Hungary) Lajos Popovics	MF	14	2		
(Hungary) Géza Pulai	MF	7			
(Hungary) Tibor Purt	FW	8		1	
(Hungary) László Svélecz	MF	22	1	3	
(Hungary) Zoltán Szabó	FW	13	4	1	
(Hungary) Csaba Szalai	DF	14	1	2	1
(Hungary) Csaba Szőcse	FW	16			
(Hungary) László Visnovics	MF	11		3	
(Hungary) Krisztián Zahorecz	MF	16	1	2	
Own goals					
Totals			28	46	3

=== Clean sheets ===
		Clean sheets
Player	Games Played	Nemzeti Bajnokság I
(Hungary) Árpád Kovácsevics	17	6
(Hungary) Zoltán Kovács	7	2
(Hungary) Csaba Gelencsér	10	1
Totals		9

Source: Competitions
