= Ofoegbu =

Ofoegbu is a Nigerian surname. Notable people with the name include:

- Gloria Ofoegbu (born 1992), Nigerian footballer
- Godian Ofoegbu (born 1975), Nigerian footballer
- Ify Ofoegbu (born 2000), Nigerian footballer
- Ike Ofoegbu (born 1984), American-Nigerian basketball player
