= Kovácsevics =

Kovácsevics or Kovacsevics is a Hungarian surname, a Hungarian-language transliteration of the Slavic surname Kovačevič. Notable people with the name include:

- Árpád Kovácsevics (born 1968), Hungarian footballer
- Róbert Kovácsevics (born 1979), Hungarian footballer
