= 1999–2000 Nemzeti Bajnokság I =

Nemzeti Bajnokság I
- Season: 1999–2000
- Champions: Dunaferr
- Relegated: Siófok; Diósgyőr; Vác; Szeged LC
- Champions League: Dunaferr
- UEFA Cup: MTK Budapest; Vasas
- Intertoto Cup: Tatabánya
- Matches: 289
- Goals: 721 (2.49 per match)
- Top goalscorer: Attila Tököli (22)
- Biggest home win: Ferencváros 8–0 Vác
- Biggest away win: Vác 0–5 MTK; Vác 0–5 Debrecen
- Highest scoring: Ferencváros 8–0 Vác

The 1999–2000 Nemzeti Bajnokság I, also known as NB I, was the 98th season of top-tier football in Hungary. The league was officially named Professzionális Nemzeti Bajnokság (PNB) for sponsorship reasons. The season started on 7 August 1999 and ended on 27 May 2000.

== Overview ==
It was contested by 18 teams, and Dunaferr FC won the championship under coach Sándor Egervári. The team from Dunaújváros claimed their first ever national title. Dunaferr finished an astounding 15 points above runners-up and defending champions MTK and lost only one game throughout the entire campaign. Dunaújváros' Központi Sporttelep served as a true fortress, as the team went unbeaten at home for the entire season, and won all but one home encounters, which was a 1–1 draw against MTK.

== League standings ==
Pos	Team	Pld	W	D	L	GF	GA	GD	Pts	Qualification or relegation
1	Dunaferr (C)	32	24	7	1	79	23	+56	79	Qualification for Champions League second qualifying round
2	MTK Hungária	32	18	9	5	64	28	+36	63	Qualification for UEFA Cup qualifying round
3	Vasas	32	19	4	9	58	32	+26	61	Qualification for UEFA Cup qualifying round
4	Tatabánya	32	14	13	5	37	34	+3	55	Qualification for Intertoto Cup first round
5	Ferencváros	32	14	8	10	61	39	+22	50	
6	Debrecen	32	14	8	10	52	41	+11	50	
7	Pécs	32	11	12	9	41	47	−6	45	
8	Győr	32	12	8	12	52	36	+16	44	
9	Nyíregyháza	32	12	8	12	32	42	−10	44	
10	Újpest	32	10	11	11	46	42	+4	41	
11	Zalaegerszeg	32	8	15	9	34	31	+3	39	
12	Kispest Honvéd	32	10	9	13	27	39	−12	39	
13	Haladás	32	8	8	16	37	53	−16	32	
14	Nagykanizsa	32	7	10	15	27	44	−17	31	
15	Siófok (R)	32	7	7	18	26	51	−25	28	Relegation to Nemzeti Bajnokság II
16	Diósgyőr (R)	32	5	9	18	26	56	−30	24	Relegation to Nemzeti Bajnokság II
17	Vác (R)	32	3	6	23	24	85	−61	15	Relegation to Nemzeti Bajnokság II
–	Szeged LC (R)	0	0	0	0	0	0	0	0	Relegation to Nemzeti Bajnokság II

Source: rsssf.com
(C) Champions; (R) Relegated

Note: Gázszer FC completed the autumn season, Pecs played in the spring.

== Results ==
Home \ Away	DEB	DIÓ	DUN	MTK	FTC	GYŐ	HAL	HON	NAG	NYÍ	PÉC	SIÓ	SZE	TAT	VAS	VÁC	UTE	ZTE
Debrecen		2–0	2–1	3–1	3–0	1–0	1–1	1–1	3–0	2–0	1–1	1–0		1–3	4–2	4–1	2–3	2–2
Diósgyőr	0–1		0–3	0–2	0–0	0–1	1–1	1–3	1–1	2–2	1–2	0–0	0–0 (Note: Due to the exclusion of Szeged LC, the results against him did not count towards the final table of the championship.)	1–2	1–1	1–1	4–1	2–1
Dunaferr	3–2	6–0		1–1	1–0	1–0	2–1	2–0	2–1	2–0	3–1	3–0	9–0	2–0	1–0	7–0	4–0	4–0
MTK Hungária	1–2	3–1	1–4		2–3	4–0	2–2	4–0	2–1	2–0	1–1	3–1		3–0	0–0	3–0	1–0	3–1
Ferencváros	0–1	2–0	2–2	1–0		2–2	6–2	1–0	3–0	4–0	4–1	1–2	4–0	0–1	1–2	8–0	0–0	1–1
Győr	1–1	4–0	2–4	2–3	2–1		4–1	4–0	4–0	4–0	0–1	1–1	3–0	0–1	2–0	1–1	3–1	0–0
Haladás	3–1	1–0	0–1	0–4	0–2	0–3		1–2	2–0	1–1	1–3	0–1	2–1	1–1	1–2	2–3	3–0	0–1
Kispest Honvéd	1–0	2–0	2–2	0–2	2–3	0–3	2–0		0–0	0–1	0–0	1–1		0–0	0–4	5–1	1–1	1–0
Nagykanizsa	1–1	2–1	0–1	1–1	0–2	2–0	1–1	0–1		1–0	1–1	1–0	1–2	0–0	1–2	3–1	1–1	0–0
Nyíregyháza	2–1	2–0	1–1	0–0	3–0	2–1	1–0	1–0	2–0		1–1	3–0		1–1	0–2	2–2	2–1	0–0
Pécs	2–0	2–2	1–2	0–1	3–2	1–1	1–2	1–2	1–0	3–0		1–1	4–1	2–2	3–2	0–0	1–4	2–2
Siófok	4–1	0–2	1–1	2–2	2–4	0–1	2–4	1–0	2–0	0–2	0–1			1–3	0–1	1–0	1–0	1–1
Szeged LC	0–4			1–2		1–1	0–3	1–1		2–1		1–1		1–4	0–2			1–0
Tatabánya	1–1	2–1	3–3	0–4	2–1	1–1	1–1	0–0	1–0	2–1	0–0	2–1			2–0	1–0	0–2	2–1
Vasas	2–0	2–0	0–2	1–2	3–3	1–0	2–0	2–0	1–4	4–0	4–0	4–0		3–0		3–0	3–0	1–0
Vác	0–5	0–2	1–1	0–5	0–2	1–4	2–4	0–1	3–4	0–1	1–2	1–0	1–1	1–1	1–3		0–4	1–3
Újpest	2–2	5–0	0–3	1–1	2–2	1–1	0–0	0–0	3–1	4–0	1–2	2–0	1–0	0–1	4–1	1–0		1–1
Zalaegerszeg	2–0	0–0	1–4	0–0	0–0	2–1	0–1	2–0	0–0	1–0	5–0	4–0		1–1	0–0	1–2	1–1	

Source: rsssf.com
Legend: Blue = home team win; Yellow = draw; Red = away team win.

== Statistical leaders ==
=== Top goalscorers ===
Rank	Scorer	Club	Goals
1	(Hungary) Attila Tököli	Dunaferr SE	22
2	(Hungary) Péter Horváth	Ferencvárosi TC	19
3	(Hungary) Mihály Tóth	Ferencvárosi TC	18
4	(Hungary) Gábor Zavadszky	Dunaferr SE	14
5	(Hungary) Béla Illés	MTK Hungária	13
5	(Hungary) Péter Kabát	Vasas SC	13
5	(Hungary) Krisztián Kenesei	MTK Hungária	13
8	(Hungary) Gyula Horváth	Nagykanizsai Olajbányász	11
8	(Hungary) Zoltán Kovács	Újpest FC	11
8	(Hungary) Norbert Tóth	Újpest FC	11

== Attendances ==
#	Club	Average
1	Zalaegerszeg	6,313
2	Nyíregyháza Spartacus	5,125
3	Ferencváros	4,903
4	Diósgyőr	4,571
5	Nagykanizsa	4,500
6	Győr	4,438
7	Vasas	4,181
8	Dunaújváros	4,176
9	Tatabánya Bányász	3,844
10	Pécs	3,611
11	Debrecen	3,375
12	Újpest	2,905
13	Szombathelyi Haladás	2,871
14	MTK	2,701
15	Kispest Honvéd	2,231
16	Vác	1,447
17	Siófok	1,404

== See also ==
- 1999–2000 Magyar Kupa
- 1999–2000 Nemzeti Bajnokság II
- 1999–2000 Nemzeti Bajnokság III
