= 1993–94 Magyar Kupa =

Tournament details
- Country: Hungary

Final positions
- Champions: Ferencváros
- Runners-up: Kispest Honvéd

The 1993–94 Magyar Kupa (English: Hungarian Cup) was the 54th season of Hungary's annual knock-out cup football competition.

== Quarter-finals ==
Team 1	Agg.	Team 2	1st leg	2nd leg
Ferencváros	3–0	Győri ETO	3–0	0–0
Debrecen	0–4	Kispest Honvéd	0–1	0–3
MTK Budapest	1–3	Vasas	0–1	1–2
ESMTK	1–2	Siófok	0–0	1–2

== Semi-finals ==
Team 1	Agg.	Team 2	1st leg	2nd leg
Siófok	2–5	Kispest Honvéd	1–3	1–2
Ferencváros	4–1	Vasas	2–0	2–1

== Final ==
25 May 1994
20:00 (UTC+2)

Ferencváros	3–0	Kispest Honvéd
Wukovics 18'; Lipcsei 33'; Páling 45'	Report

Üllői úti stadion, Budapest
Attendance: 15,000
Referee: Sándor Piller (Hungary)
15 June 1994
20:00 (UTC+2)

Kispest Honvéd	1–2	Ferencváros
Vincze 46'	Report	Christiansen 39'; Wukovics 81'

Bozsik József Stadion, Budapest
Attendance: 12,000
Referee: Lajos Hartmann (Hungary)

== See also ==
- 1993–94 Nemzeti Bajnokság I
