= 1993–94 Nemzeti Bajnokság II =

Nemzeti Bajnokság II
- Season: 1993–94
- Champions: Nagykanizsai Olajbányász SE (West); Kiskörös (East)
- Promoted: Nagykanizsai Olajbányász SE (West) Zalaegerszeg (West); Kiskörös (East)
- Relegated: Dorog (West); Pénzügyőr (West); Szekszárd (West); Szeged FC (East); Eger (East); Rákospalota (East)

The 1993–94 Nemzeti Bajnokság II was the 96th season of the Nemzeti Bajnokság II, the second tier of the Hungarian football league.

== League table ==
=== Western group ===
Pos	Team	Pld	W	D	L	GF	GA	GD	Pts	Promotion or relegation
1	Nagykanizsai Olajbányász SE	30	21	5	4	60	16	+44	47	Promotion to Nemzeti Bajnokság I
2	Zalaegerszegi TE	30	19	4	7	59	29	+30	42	Promotion to Nemzeti Bajnokság I
3	Dunaferr SE	30	18	6	6	44	20	+24	42	
4	Százhalombattai FC	30	15	4	11	46	38	+8	34	
5	Keszthelyi Honvéd Haladás SE	30	14	6	10	35	32	+3	34	
6	BKV Előre SC	30	13	7	10	41	29	+12	33	
7	Budafoki MTE	30	11	7	12	42	40	+2	29	
8	ESMTK-Hungaplast	30	11	7	12	31	31	0	29	
9	Paksi SE-Atomerőmű SE	30	10	7	13	28	35	−7	27	
10	Mohácsi FC	30	9	9	12	40	51	−11	27	
11	Beremendi Építők SK	30	10	6	14	39	37	+2	26	
12	Veszprémi FC	30	10	6	14	38	44	−6	26	
13	Bajai FC	30	10	6	14	25	35	−10	26	
14	Dorogi Bányász SC	30	8	9	13	19	32	−13	25	Relegation
15	Pénzügyőr SE	30	4	12	14	26	53	−27	20	Relegation
16	Szekszárdi Polgári SE	30	5	3	22	17	68	−51	13	Relegation

=== Eastern group ===
Pos	Team	Pld	W	D	L	GF	GA	GD	Pts	Promotion or relegation
1	Kiskörős-Stadler FC	30	15	10	5	55	32	+23	40	Promotion to Nemzeti Bajnokság I
2	FC Hatvan	30	16	6	8	40	33	+7	38	
3	III. Kerületi TVE	30	13	8	9	40	31	+9	34	
4	Diósgyőri FC	30	13	8	9	44	39	+5	34	
5	Tiszakécskei FC	30	13	8	9	41	37	+4	34	
6	Szarvasi Vasas SE	30	12	10	8	37	39	−2	34	
7	Tiszavasvári Alkaloida SE	30	11	11	8	47	37	+10	33	
8	Nyíregyházi FC	30	12	8	10	33	24	+9	32	
9	Hajdúnánási FC	30	11	9	10	40	36	+4	31	
10	Kabai Cukor FC	30	12	7	11	35	36	−1	31	
11	Gödöllői FC	30	9	8	13	38	44	−6	26	
12	Balmazújvárosi SC	30	8	9	13	35	45	−10	25	
13	Kazincbarcikai SC	30	7	10	13	35	43	−8	24	
14	Szeged FC	30	6	10	14	26	42	−16	22	Relegation
15	FC Eger	30	7	7	16	36	45	−9	21	Relegation
16	Rákospalotai EAC	30	7	7	16	33	52	−19	19 (Note: 2 points deducted)	Relegation

== Promotion playoffs ==
Siófoki Bányász FC 4–3 Zalaegerszegi TE

Zalaegerszegi TE 6–0 Siófoki Bányász FC

== See also ==
- 1993–94 Magyar Kupa
- 1993–94 Nemzeti Bajnokság I
