= Makói FC =

Hungarian football club

- Founded: 1989; 37 years ago 2011; 15 years ago
- Ground: Stadium Erdei Ferenc tér, Makó, Hungary
- Capacity: 2,500
- Chairman: Kolozsvári János
- Manager: Ménesi Gábor
- Coach: Zsolt Siha
- League: NB III
- 2023-24: 6th
Home colours	Away colours

Makói FC is a Hungarian football club located in Makó, Hungary. Following a series of relegations and the closure of their stadium, the team currently plays in the Csongrád-Csanád County I. Division. The team's colors are yellow and green.

== Honours ==
- Nemzeti Bajnokság III:
  - Winners (1): 2003–04
