= 1996–97 Nemzeti Bajnokság I =

Nemzeti Bajnokság I
- Season: 1996–97
- Champions: MTK Budapest
- Relegated: Tiszakécske; Békéscsaba; Stadler
- Champions League: MTK Budapest
- UEFA Cup: Újpest; Ferencváros
- Cup Winners' Cup: Budapesti VSC
- Intertoto Cup: Vasas
- Matches: 306
- Goals: 842 (2.75 per match)
- Top goalscorer: Béla Illés (23)
- Biggest home win: Csepel 9–1 Békéscsaba
- Biggest away win: III. Kerület 2–7 MTK
- Highest scoring: III. Kerület 2–7 MTK; Csepel 9–1 Békéscsaba

The 1996–97 Nemzeti Bajnokság I, also known as NB I, was the 95th season of top-tier football in Hungary. The season started on 10 August 1996 and ended on 28 May 1997.

== Overview ==
It was contested by 18 teams, and MTK Hungária FC won their twentieth championship. MTK won all of their first 15 games, and suffered a single loss throughout the season, against BVSC-Zugló. The team won the championship on matchday 32, after defeating Ecker-Stadler FC 5–3 in an 8-goal classic. MTK eventually finished 9 points ahead of runners-up Újpest. The point tally achieved by champions MTK (85) is the highest ever achieved by any Hungarian champion. MTK also won the 1997 Hungarian Cup, defeating BVSC 8–0 on aggregate.

MTK's point tally of 85 is the highest ever achieved in a single season in the history of the Hungarian league. They also won the most number of games in a single season, leaving the pitch as victors 26 times, breaking Vasas' record of 25 set in 1977.

== League standings ==
Pos	Team	Pld	W	D	L	GF	GA	GD	Pts	Qualification or relegation
1	MTK Hungária (C)	34	26	7	1	87	25	+62	85	Qualification for Champions League first qualifying round
2	Újpest	34	23	7	4	75	35	+40	76	Qualification for UEFA Cup first qualifying round
3	Ferencváros	34	22	8	4	69	37	+32	74	Qualification for UEFA Cup first qualifying round
4	Vasas	34	19	7	8	50	33	+17	64	Qualification for Intertoto Cup group stage
5	Debrecen	34	14	10	10	55	38	+17	52	
6	BVSC	34	14	7	13	43	36	+7	49	Qualification for Cup Winners' Cup qualifying round
7	Kispest Honvéd	34	12	9	13	42	44	−2	45	
8	Videoton	34	10	12	12	45	44	+1	42	
9	Győr	34	10	12	12	44	51	−7	42	
10	Haladás	34	10	10	14	39	42	−3	40	
11	Vác	34	10	10	14	40	48	−8	40	
12	Siófok	34	10	10	14	36	53	−17	40	
13	Zalaegerszeg	34	11	7	16	34	51	−17	40	
14	Békéscsaba	34	10	6	18	37	62	−25	36	
15	III. Kerület (R)	34	8	11	15	45	55	−10	35	Qualification for relegation play-offs
16	Stadler (O)	34	7	7	20	27	50	−23	28	Qualification for relegation play-offs
17	Pécs (R)	34	6	8	20	31	68	−37	26	Relegation to Nemzeti Bajnokság II
18	Csepel (R)	34	5	10	19	43	70	−27	25	Relegation to Nemzeti Bajnokság II

Source: rsssf.com
(C) Champions; (O) Play-off winners; (R) Relegated

== Results ==
Home \ Away	BÉK	BVS	CSE	DEB	FTC	GYŐ	HAL	KER	HON	MTK	PÉC	SIÓ	STA	VAS	VÁC	VID	UTE	ZTE
Békéscsaba		0–1	2–1	0–3	0–1	5–0	1–3	2–1	2–2	0–0	3–0	1–1	1–2	3–3	3–2	0–0	1–3	3–1
BVSC	1–0		2–1	2–0	1–2	3–1	3–2	1–2	0–1	0–2	1–0	4–1	4–1	0–1	0–1	0–0	1–2	2–0
Csepel	9–1	1–1		0–0	1–1	1–2	2–1	2–1	0–1	0–3	0–1	1–0	2–2	2–3	1–1	1–1	1–4	1–2
Debrecen	4–0	1–4	3–0		2–2	0–0	3–1	4–0	0–0	1–4	3–1	2–0	3–1	2–1	1–2	2–2	0–1	1–0
Ferencváros	4–0	2–1	4–2	3–1		3–2	2–0	1–0	5–2	1–1	2–1	3–2	1–0	1–0	3–1	2–2	3–1	5–0
Győr	1–2	2–1	5–0	3–1	1–1		1–2	2–2	2–1	0–3	2–1	1–1	2–0	2–3	0–0	2–2	1–1	1–0
Haladás	2–0	2–1	1–1	0–2	1–0	1–1		1–1	2–1	0–0	6–0	2–3	1–0	0–1	1–1	0–0	1–2	0–0
III. Kerület	1–0	0–0	5–3	0–0	4–3	0–0	2–3		1–2	2–7	3–1	3–0	0–0	2–0	1–2	0–0	1–1	2–1
Kispest Honvéd	0–1	1–1	3–0	1–1	0–2	1–1	2–0	2–0		2–2	3–1	4–0	2–1	1–1	1–1	3–0	0–2	0–1
MTK Hungária	3–1	0–1	5–2	1–0	3–0	4–0	2–2	2–1	2–0		6–0	0–0	5–3	2–0	3–0	2–0	2–1	1–0
Pécs	0–1	1–2	1–1	1–1	1–2	2–2	1–0	2–2	1–1	1–3		2–0	2–0	3–3	2–0	1–1	1–2	1–0
Siófok	0–0	1–1	0–1	0–0	2–3	1–0	4–1	2–1	1–0	0–3	1–1		1–1	3–1	0–0	2–1	0–2	0–2
Stadler	1–2	2–1	1–1	1–3	0–0	0–1	0–0	1–0	2–0	1–2	1–0	1–2		0–3	2–0	0–1	1–3	1–0
Vasas	1–0	2–0	1–0	1–0	1–1	2–0	1–0	1–0	3–0	1–2	1–0	2–0	2–1		0–0	1–0	2–3	0–0
Vác	2–0	0–1	3–3	0–2	1–1	3–1	0–1	3–2	2–0	1–4	5–0	2–2	2–0	0–1		1–0	0–1	1–1
Videoton	1–0	2–0	1–0	3–2	0–2	1–2	2–1	2–2	2–3	1–3	5–0	2–3	2–0	2–2	6–2		1–3	1–0
Újpest	4–1	0–0	6–1	2–2	1–2	2–2	1–1	3–2	3–0	0–2	3–1	4–1	0–0	2–1	3–1	2–1		5–0
Zalaegerszeg	4–2	2–2	2–1	1–5	2–1	2–1	1–0	1–1	1–2	3–3	2–0	1–2	1–0	1–4	1–0	0–0	1–2	

Source: rsssf.com
Legend: Blue = home team win; Yellow = draw; Red = away team win.

== Relegation play-offs ==
Team 1	Agg.	Team 2	1st leg	2nd leg
III. Kerület (I)	1–2	Diósgyőr (II)	1–0	0–2
Dunaferr (II)	3–4	Stadler (I)	2–2	1–2

== Statistical leaders ==
=== Top goalscorers ===
Rank	Scorer	Club	Goals
1	(Hungary) Béla Illés	MTK Hungária	23
2	(Hungary) Tamás Sándor	Debreceni VSC-Epona	20
3	(Hungary) Zoltán Kovács	Újpesti TE	18
4	(Romania) Nicolae Ilea	Debreceni VSC-Epona	16
5	(Ukraine) Ihor Nichenko	Ferencvárosi TC	15
6	(Hungary) Tibor Fodor	Újpest FC	14
6	(Hungary) Ferenc Horváth	Ferencvárosi TC	14
6	(Hungary) Krisztián Kenesei	MTK Hungária	14
9	(Hungary) Károly Szanyó	Újpesti TE	12
10	(Hungary) Mihály Tóth	Kispest Honvéd FC	11

== Attendances ==
#	Club	Average
1	Ferencváros	9,951
2	Debrecen	7,059
3	Zalaegerszeg	6,794
4	Szombathelyi Haladás	6,206
5	Videoton	6,147
6	Újpest	5,588
7	Békéscsaba	4,618
8	Győr	4,429
9	Vasas	4,353
10	III. kerület	4,235
11	Pécs	4,176
12	Kispest Honvéd	3,029
13	Siófok	3,029
14	MTK	2,981
15	Vác	2,353
16	Stadler	1,876
17	BVSC	1,582
18	Csepel	1,571

== See also ==
- 1996–97 Magyar Kupa
- 1996–97 Nemzeti Bajnokság II
- 1996–97 Nemzeti Bajnokság III
