= Kiskundorozsmai ESK =

Hungarian football club

- Full name: Kiskundorozsmai Egységes Sportkör
- Founded: 1925
- Ground: Kiskundorozsmai Sportpálya
- League: Megyei Bajnokság I
- Website: https://www.dorozsmaesk.hu/
Home colours

Kiskundorozsmai Egységes Sportkör is a semi-professional football club based in Kiskundorozsma, Csongrád-Csanád County, Hungary, that competes in the Megyei Bajnokság I, the fourth tier of Hungarian football.

== History ==
The football club was founded in 1925 in Kiskundorozsma—which has a population of 12,000 today and is administratively part of Szeged—under the name Kiskundorozsmai Egységes Sportkör, and the team’s official colors became green and white.

Throughout its history, the club has mostly competed in the first division of the Csongrád County regional league i.e. Megyei Bajnokság I. The team enjoyed its heyday in the mid- to late 1990s.

The beginning of its major rise came in the 1993–94 season, when the team won the gold medal in Csongrád County, thereby earning the right to compete in the Alföld group of NBIII for the 1994–95 season. During the fall season of NB III, the team’s performance was still modest; with 18 points, they were in 12th place. However, they improved by spring and added another 26 points to their total. With this, the rookie squad confidently secured its place in NB III (10th place, 44 points). The following season (1995–96), the Kiskundorozsma team finished first in the NB III league, leaving everyone else behind (20 wins, 4 draws, 6 losses), thereby earning the right to compete in Nemzeti Bajnokság II. But the success story didn't end there, as thanks to the reorganization and expansion introduced by the MLSZ, the top eight teams from the two-group NBII season of 1996–97 were able to advance to the second tier of Hungarian soccer. The significantly strengthened KESK ultimately succeeded in doing so, and thus, within a few years, the small club found itself in the second division after starting out in the regional league. Since local business owners and sponsors could no longer support a second-division team, the club had to expand its reach to Szeged as well, which led to a change in the team’s name; the club began the 1997–98 second-division season (NB I/B) under the name Szeged-Dorozsma, and its home games were held at the Felső-Tisza Stadium, home of the historic SZEAC (founded in 1899 by immigrants from Jögelő), which was already in its death throes at that time. The further-strengthened team held its own here as well, remaining in contention for promotion to the top division for a long time, but ultimately managed only a 5th-place finish (13 wins, 9 draws, 6 losses), falling 4 points short of the 2nd-place spot that would have secured a promotion playoff berth.

== Name changes ==
- 1925–?: Kiskundorozsmai Egységes Sportkör
- ?–1948: Dorozsmai FC
- 1946– merger with Dorozsmai Lemezgyár
- 1948–1951: Dorozsmai Kunsági MTE
- 1951: Dorozsmai Vörös Lobogó
- 1951-1952: Dorozsmai Kunsági MTE
- 1952: fusion with Szegedi Postás
- 1953: left Szegedi Postás
- 1953–1954: Dorozsmai Vörös Lobogó
- 1954–1955: Dorozsmai Előre
- 1955–1959: Dorozsmai SK
- 1959–?: Dorozsmai MEDOSZ
- ?–?: Dorozsmai KSK
- ?–?: Szegedi Egységes SE
- ?–1997: Kiskundorozsmai Egységes Sport Kör
- 1997–1998: Szeged-Dorozsma FC
- 1998–2025: Kiskundorozsmai Egységes Sport Kör
- 2025–present: Clean Star Complex Dorozsma

== Honours ==
=== League ===
- Nemzeti Bajnokság III:
  - Winners (1): 1995–96
