= 1993–94 Nemzeti Bajnokság I =

Nemzeti Bajnokság I
- Season: 1993–94
- Champions: Vác
- Relegated: Siófoki Bányász; Haladás; MTK Hungária
- Champions League: Vác
- UEFA Cup: Kispest Honvéd; Békéscsaba
- Cup Winners' Cup: Ferencváros
- Matches: 240
- Goals: 659 (2.75 per match)
- Top goalscorer: Béla Illés (17)

Statistics of Nemzeti Bajnokság I in the 1993–94 season.

== Overview ==
It was contested by 16 teams, and Vác FC won the championship for the first time in the club's history under headcoach János Csank.

Vác won 8 of their last 11 games, and suffered their last defeat of the campaign in March, against Békéscsaba. The pest-county city's championship was confirmed on 4 June 1994, after Vác drew 2–2 against Vasas in front of 10,000 spectators, becoming the third team outside of Budapest to win a national championship.

The defending champions Kispest finished second, three points below Vác, and remained undefeated in their last 12 games. Due to their earlier league defeats suffered against Vác, Ferencváros, Győr and Debrecen, meant the undefeated streak was all in vain, as it was still only enough for a silver-medal.

== League standings ==
Pos	Team	Pld	W	D	L	GF	GA	GD	Pts	Qualification or relegation
1	Vác (C)	30	19	8	3	58	29	+29	46	Qualification for Champions League qualifying round
2	Kispest Honvéd	30	18	7	5	66	33	+33	43	Qualification for UEFA Cup preliminary round
3	Békéscsaba	30	19	3	8	68	29	+39	41	Qualification for UEFA Cup preliminary round
4	Ferencváros	30	16	5	9	50	32	+18	37	Qualification for Cup Winners' Cup qualifying round
5	Győr	30	15	7	8	51	37	+14	37	
6	Újpest	30	13	8	9	44	35	+9	34	
7	Debrecen	30	12	9	9	40	33	+7	33	
8	Csepel	30	12	8	10	36	44	−8	32	
9	Parmalat	30	8	9	13	33	46	−13	25	
10	Vasas	30	8	8	14	36	43	−7	24	
11	PMSC Fordan	30	7	10	13	23	39	−16	24	
12	BVSC	30	7	10	13	32	52	−20	24	
13	Siófoki Bányász (R)	30	6	10	14	33	49	−16	22	Qualification for relegation play-offs
14	EMDSZ Sopron (O)	30	8	6	16	31	52	−21	22	Qualification for relegation play-offs
15	Haladás (R)	30	5	9	16	28	48	−20	19	Relegation to Nemzeti Bajnokság II
16	MTK Hungária (R)	30	4	9	17	30	58	−28	17	Relegation to Nemzeti Bajnokság II

Source: rsssf.com
(C) Champions; (O) Play-off winners; (R) Relegated

== Results ==
Home \ Away	BÉK	BVS	CSE	DEB	SOP	FTC	GYŐ	HAL	HON	MTK	PAR	PÉC	SIÓ	VAS	VÁC	UTE
Békéscsaba		3–0	6–1	1–2	5–2	1–0	0–2	5–1	0–1	2–0	5–0	5–0	1–1	2–1	1–1	2–2
BVSC	0–4		1–1	1–2	0–0	1–5	3–0	1–0	1–4	3–2	3–0	1–1	0–0	2–1	0–0	2–3
Csepel	2–0	2–0		1–3	3–1	1–2	1–2	2–0	0–2	1–1	2–1	2–1	2–2	2–0	1–1	1–0
Debrecen	0–2	1–1	1–1		0–0	2–0	1–0	1–0	2–1	2–0	2–1	1–1	2–1	3–1	0–1	2–2
EMDSZ Sopron	2–3	1–0	0–1	1–1		0–1	0–1	2–2	0–3	1–1	1–0	2–0	6–1	1–3	0–2	2–0
Ferencváros	4–2	4–2	3–0	1–0	1–0		2–1	2–1	2–1	0–0	3–0	3–0	1–3	5–1	0–0	0–1
Győr	2–5	5–1	0–0	1–1	2–1	3–1		2–1	5–1	3–1	1–1	1–2	3–1	3–2	0–1	2–1
Haladás	0–2	0–1	0–2	0–0	3–1	1–1	1–2		1–1	1–1	2–1	0–0	0–1	3–2	1–3	3–2
Kispest Honvéd	0–2	0–0	8–1	2–1	3–1	1–0	2–0	0–0		3–1	1–1	1–0	4–2	0–0	1–2	1–1
MTK Hungária	0–3	0–2	0–1	2–4	1–2	1–1	2–1	3–2	1–4		1–1	1–1	2–0	0–3	2–3	0–2
Parmalat	1–0	1–1	3–0	2–1	4–1	3–1	1–1	1–1	1–5	1–1		1–0	2–2	1–1	0–1	1–0
PMSC Fordan	0–2	0–0	1–0	2–1	2–0	0–0	0–0	2–0	1–4	2–3	1–0		1–0	0–0	2–2	1–1
Siófoki Bányász	1–2	1–1	1–1	1–0	0–1	2–4	1–3	1–1	2–2	1–1	1–3	2–0		2–1	0–1	1–0
Vasas	1–0	5–1	0–2	1–0	1–2	0–1	1–1	0–2	1–2	2–1	1–0	2–1	1–1		1–1	1–1
Vác	1–2	3–2	3–1	2–1	7–0	3–2	2–2	2–1	2–4	4–0	4–0	1–0	1–0	2–2		2–0
Újpest	1–0	3–1	1–1	3–3	0–0	1–0	0–2	4–0	2–4	2–1	2–1	3–0	2–1	1–0	3–0	

Source: rsssf.com
Legend: Blue = home team win; Yellow = draw; Red = away team win.

== Relegation play-offs ==
Team 1	Agg.	Team 2	1st leg	2nd leg
EMDSZ Sopron (I)	2–2 (4–2 p)	Hatvan (II)	2–0	0–2 (a.e.t.)
Siófoki Bányász (I)	4–9	Zalaegerszeg (II)	4–3	0–6

== Statistical leaders ==
=== Top goalscorers ===
Rank	Scorer	Club	Goals
1	(Hungary) Béla Illés	Kispest Honvéd FC	17
2	(Hungary) János Szarvas	Békéscsabai Előre	16
3	(Hungary) Antal Füle	Vác FC	15
4	(Hungary) Tamás Sándor	Debreceni VSC	14
4	(Hungary) László Wukovics	Ferencvárosi TC	14
6	(Hungary) Ferenc Horváth	Parmalat FC	13
6	(Romania) Sándor Kulcsár	Békéscsabai Előre	13
8	(Romania) Cătălin Azoiței	PMSC-Fordan	10
8	(Hungary) György Bognár	Budapesti VSC	10

== Attendances ==
Average home league attendance top 3:

#	Club	Average
1	Ferencváros	12,000
2	Békéscsaba	8,267
3	Sopron	7,100

== See also ==
- 1993–94 Magyar Kupa
