= Kiskőrösi FC =

Hungarian football club

- Full name: Kiskőrösi Futball Club
- Founded: 1912
- Ground: Kiskőrösi Sportpálya
- Capacity: 5,000 (2,800 seated)
- League: Bács-Kiskun megye I.
- 2022/2023: 14th
Home colours

Kiskőrösi Futball Club is a Hungarian football club from the town of Kiskőrös.

== History ==
Kiskőrösi FC debuted in the 1994–95 season of the Hungarian League and finished ninth.

== Honours ==
- Nemzeti Bajnokság II:
  - Winners (1): 1993–94
- Nemzeti Bajnokság III:
  - Winners (3): 1991–92, 1996–97, 1999–2000

== Name changes ==
- ?-1930: Kiskőrösi Football Club
- 1930: merger with Kiskőrösi MOVE SE
- 1930–?: Kiskőrösi Petőfi Testedző Egyesület
- ?-?: Kiskőrösi Levente Egyesület
- ?-?: Kiskőrösi SC
- 1947–1955: Kiskőrösi Petőfi SE
- 1948: merger with Kiskőrösi Barátság
- 1955–1957: Kiskőrösi Bástya
- 1957–?: Kiskőrösi Petőfi
- ?-1968: Kiskőrösi MEDOSZ
- 1968–1971: Kiskőrösi Gépjavító
- 1971: merger with Kiskőrösi Spartacusszal
- 1971–?: Kiskőrösi Petőfi Spartacus
- ?-1993: Kiskőrösi Petőfi LC
- 1993–1994 Kiskőrös-Stadler FC
- 1994: moved to Akasztó as Stadler FC
- 1994: Akasztó FC
- 1994–2003: Kiskőrösi FC
- ?-present: Kiskőrösi LC

== Seasons ==
The table below shows the seasons of Kiskőrös LC.

Season	Tier	Club's name	Position	Pts
1920–21	2	Kiskőrösi FC	4 / 6	
1921–22	2	Kiskőrösi FC	4 / 10	12
1922–23	2	Kiskőrösi FC	8 / 10	5
1923–24	2	Kiskőrösi FC	0 / 4	-
1928–29	3	Kiskőrösi FC	4 / 8	5
1929–30	3	Kiskőrösi FC	3 / 6	11
1930–31	3	Kiskőrösi Petőfi TE	4 / 4	
1932–33	2	Kiskőrösi Petőfi TE	8 / 11	14
1933–34	2	Kiskőrösi Petőfi TE	9 / 10	0
1939–40	3	Kiskőrösi LE	9 / 12	14
1940–41	4	Kiskőrösi LE	6 / 9	2
1941–42	5	Kiskőrösi MOVE	2 / 11	8
1943–44	4	Kiskőrösi MOVE	7 / 8	8
1945	3	Kiskőrösi Petőfi SE	0 / 7	
1945–46	3	Kiskőrösi Petőfi	3 / 7	15
1946–47	4	Kiskőrösi Petőfi	0 / 12	
1947–48	5	Kiskörösi Petőfi	0 / 14	
1948–49	4	Kiskőrösi Petőfi	1 / 14	42
1949–50	3	Kiskőrösi Petőfi	8 / 16	29
1950	3	Kiskőrösi Petőfi	14 / 16	10
1951	3	Kiskőrösi Petőfi	11 / 12	14
1952	4	Kiskőrösi Petőfi	1 / 14	47
1953	3	Kiskőrösi Petőfi	6 / 12	20
1954	3	Kiskőrösi Petőfi	9 / 14	22
1955	3	Kiskőrösi Bástya	6 / 14	28
1956	3	Kiskőrösi Bástya	14 / 16	20
1957	3	Kiskőrösi Petőfi	7 / 10	13
1957–58	4	Kiskőrös	9 / 16	29
1958–59	4	Kiskőrös	4 / 16	35
1959–60	4	Kiskőrösi Petőfi	9 / 16	26
1960–61	4	Kiskőrös	8 / 16	30
1961–62	4	Kiskőrösi Petőfi	11 / 17	28
1962–63	4	Kiskőrösi Petőfi	7 / 16	27
1963	5	Kiskőrösi MEDOSZ SK	5 / 14	18
1964	5	Kiskőrösi MEDOSZ SK	2 / 16	39
1965	5	Kiskőrösi MEDOSZ SK	1 / 14	44
1966	5	Kiskőrösi MEDOSZ SK	3 / 16	38
1967	5	Kiskőrösi MEDOSZ SK	1 / 16	49
1968	4	Kiskőrösi Gépjavító	10 / 16	28
1969	4	Kiskőrösi Gépjavító	9 / 16	30
1970	4	Kiskőrösi Gépjavító	6 / 16	17
1970–71	4	Kiskőrösi Gépjavító SE	9 / 16	28
1971–72	4	Kiskőrösi Petőfi Spartacus	11 / 16	25
1972–73	4	Kiskőrősi Petőfi Spartacus	10 / 16	26
1973–74	4	Kiskőrösi Petőfi Spartacus	9 / 16	31
1974–75	4	Kiskőrös	4 / 18	42
1975–76	4	Kiskőrösi Petőfi Spartacus	7 / 18	37
1976–77	4	Kiskőrösi Petőfi Spartacus SE	18 / 20	28
1977–78	5	Kiskőrösi Petőfi Spartacus SE	1 / 14	32
1978–79	3	Kiskőrösi Petőfi Spartacus SE	15 / 20	28
1979–80	3	Kiskőrösi Petőfi Spartacus SE	13 / 18	27
1980–81	3	Kiskőrösi Petőfi Spartacus SE	15 / 18	25
1981–82	4	Kiskőrösi Petőfi Spartacus SE	2 / 16	43
1982–83	4	Kiskőrösi Petőfi Spartacus	7 / 16	33
1983–84	4	Kiskőrösi Petőfi Spartacus	13 / 16	22
1984–85	4	Kiskőrösi Petőfi Spartacus	3 / 16	41
1985–86	4	Kiskőrösi Petőfi Spartacus	14 / 16	25
1986–87	4	Kiskőrösi Petőfi Spartacus	11 / 17	29
1987–88	4	Kiskőrösi Petőfi Spartacus	1 / 16	45
1988–89	3	Kiskőrös	8 / 16	42
1989–90	3	Kiskőrösi Petőfi SK	5 / 16	47
1990–91	3	Kiskőrösi Petőfi LC	2 / 16	43
1991–92	3	Kiskőrösi Petőfi LC	1 / 16	48
1992–93	2	Kiskőrös FC	4 / 16	33
1993–94	2	Kiskörős-Stadler FC	1 / 16	40
1994–95	3	Kiskőrös FC	2 / 16	56
1995–96	3	Kiskőrös FC	7 / 16	46
1996–97	3	Kiskőrös FC	1 / 16	60
1997–98	3	Kiskőrös	4 / 16	47
1998–99	3	Kiskőrösi FC	11 / 16	27
1999–00	3	Kiskőrös	1 / 16	63
2000	2	Kiskőrös FC	7 / 7	7
2000–01	3	Kiskőrös FC	8 / 12	23
2001–02	4	Kiskőrös FC	2 / 13	43
2002–03	7	Kiskőrös FC	4 / 13	46
2003–04	7	Kiskőrös FC	1 / 13	62
2004–05	6	Kiskőrös	1 / 16	80
2005–06	4	Kiskőrös LC	5 / 16	54
2006–07	4	Kiskőrös LC	4 / 16	57
2007–08	4	Kiskőrösi LC	3 / 16	61
2008–09	4	Kiskőrösi LC	3 / 15	54
2009–10	4	Kiskőrös LC	5 / 16	49
2010–11	4	Kiskőrös LC	8 / 16	43
2011–12	4	Kiskőrös LC	7 / 13	34
2012–13	4	Kiskőrös LC	8 / 13	27
2013–14	4	Kiskőrös LC	6 / 16	52
2014–15	4	Kiskőrösi LC	8 / 15	33
2015–16	4	Kiskőrös LC	8 / 15	39
2016–17	4	Kiskőrösi LC	8 / 15	35
2017–18	4	Kiskőrösi LC	8 / 13	29
2018–19	4	Kiskőrösi LC	3 / 14	54
2019–20	4	Kiskőrös LC	10 / 15	20
2020–21	4	Kiskőrösi LC	4 / 15	50
2021–22	4	Kiskőrösi LC	2 / 13	48
2022–23	4	Kiskőrösi LC	14 / 14	21
2023–24	4	Kiskőrösi LC	10 / 15	36
2024–25	4	Kiskőrösi LC	12 / 16	40
2025–26	4	Kiskőrösi LC	13 / 16	29
