= 2003–04 Nemzeti Bajnokság III =

Nemzeti Bajnokság III
- Season: 2003–04
- Champions: Mosonmagyaróvári TE (West); Makói FC (East)
- Promoted: Mosonmagyaróvári TE (West); Makói FC (East); Orosháza FC (East)

The 2003–04 Nemzeti Bajnokság III season was the 22nd edition of the Nemzeti Bajnokság III.

== League table ==
=== Western group ===
Pos	Team	Pld	W	D	L	GF	GA	GD	Pts	Promotion or relegation
1	Mosonmagyaróvári TE	30	21	2	7	69	36	+33	65	Promotion to Nemzeti Bajnokság II
2	Komlói Bányász SK	30	18	8	4	53	19	+34	62	
3	Paksi SE	30	16	9	5	47	31	+16	57	
4	Veszprém LC	30	14	11	5	47	34	+13	53	
5	Barcs SC	30	14	4	12	44	41	+3	46	
6	Tatai HAC	30	11	9	10	47	38	+9	42	Relegation to Megyei Bajnokság I
7	Sárvári FC	30	8	16	6	41	37	+4	40	Relegation to Megyei Bajnokság I
8	Kaposvölgye VSC	30	11	6	13	46	43	+3	39	
9	Budakalászi MSE	30	9	9	12	33	48	−15	36	
10	Balatonlelle SE	30	8	10	12	31	41	−10	34	
11	Mezőfalva MSE	30	9	6	15	37	56	−19	33	
12	Erzsébeti SMTK	30	8	8	14	36	47	−11	32	
13	Celldömölki VSE	30	9	5	16	46	48	−2	32	
14	Budafoki FC	30	8	6	16	27	48	−21	30	
15	Pénzügyőr SE	30	6	10	14	27	42	−15	22 (Note: 6 points deducted?)	
16	Szigetszentmiklósi TK	30	7	7	16	29	51	−22	22 (Note: 6 points deducted?)	Relegation to Megyei Bajnokság I

=== Eastern group ===
Pos	Team	Pld	W	D	L	GF	GA	GD	Pts	Promotion or relegation
1	Makói FC	30	19	7	4	70	18	+52	64	Promotion to Nemzeti Bajnokság II
2	Orosháza FC	30	19	7	4	53	25	+28	64	Promotion to Nemzeti Bajnokság II
3	Gyulai TFC	30	17	8	5	55	29	+26	59	
4	Baktalórántháza VSE	30	17	6	7	57	25	+32	57	
5	Szentesi TE	30	13	8	9	61	39	+22	47	
6	Kazincbarcikai SC	30	12	9	9	59	57	+2	45	
7	Soroksár SC	30	11	10	9	50	31	+19	43	
8	Mátészalkai MTK	30	12	6	12	58	56	+2	42	
9	Karcagi SE	30	9	14	7	44	36	+8	41	
10	Putnok VSE	30	11	5	14	49	56	−7	38	
11	Kistarcsai VSC	30	11	4	15	41	58	−17	37	
12	Salgótarjáni BTC	30	10	3	17	30	48	−18	33	
13	Kiskunhalasi FC	30	8	7	15	36	56	−20	31	
14	Vecsési FC	30	8	3	19	37	75	−38	27	
15	Budapesti VSC	30	4	9	17	35	65	−30	21	Relegation to Megyei Bajnokság I
16	Sátoraljaújhelyi TKSE	30	4	4	22	36	97	−61	16	Relegation to Megyei Bajnokság I

== See also ==
- 2003–04 Magyar Kupa
- 2003–04 Nemzeti Bajnokság I
- 2003–04 Nemzeti Bajnokság II
