= 2005–06 Nemzeti Bajnokság II =

Nemzeti Bajnokság II
- Season: 2005–06
- Champions: Paks (West); Vác (East)
- Promoted: Paks (West); Vác (East)
- Relegated: Mosonmagyaróvár (West); Kaposvölgye (West); Ajka (West); Budafok (East); ESMTK (East); Szentes (East)
- Top goalscorer: Gábor Földes (Felcsút) (21 goals)
- All statistics correct as of 15 July 2006.

The 2005–06 Nemzeti Bajnokság II was Hungary's 108th season of the Nemzeti Bajnokság II, the second tier of the Hungarian football league system.

== League table ==
=== Western group ===
Pos	Team	Pld	W	D	L	GF	GA	GD	Pts	Promotion or relegation
1	Paks (P)	30	25	1	4	66	22	+44	76	Promotion to Nemzeti Bajnokság I
2	Felcsút	30	20	3	7	72	41	+31	63	
3	Gyirmót	30	15	12	3	53	25	+28	57	
4	Integrál-DAC	30	15	6	9	52	38	+14	51	
5	Barcs	30	13	3	14	42	47	−5	42	
6	Haladás	30	12	6	12	38	37	+1	42	
7	Siófok	30	11	7	12	39	40	−1	40	
8	Celldömölk	30	10	8	12	31	35	−4	38	
9	Budakalász	30	9	9	12	39	43	−4	36	
10	Hévíz	30	7	14	9	32	34	−2	35	
11	Balatonlelle	30	8	9	13	30	49	−19	33	
12	BKV Előre	30	7	10	13	32	41	−9	31	
13	Dunaújváros	30	7	10	13	36	53	−17	31	
14	Mosonmagyaróvár (R)	30	7	9	14	35	47	−12	30	Relegation to Nemzeti Bajnokság III
15	Kaposvölgye (R)	30	6	9	15	40	59	−19	27	Relegation to Nemzeti Bajnokság III
16	Ajka (R)	30	5	10	15	27	53	−26	25	Relegation to Nemzeti Bajnokság III

Source: Hungarian Football Federation (in Hungarian), Soccerway
Rules for classification: 1) Points; 2) Matches won; 3) Goal difference; 4) Goals scored; 5) Head-to-head points; 6) Head-to-head goal difference; 7) Head-to-head away goals scored; 8) Fair play ranking; 9) Drawing of lots.
(P) Promoted; (R) Relegated

=== Eastern group ===
Pos	Team	Pld	W	D	L	GF	GA	GD	Pts	Promotion or relegation
1	Vác (P)	28	18	7	3	61	25	+36	61	Promotion to Nemzeti Bajnokság I
2	Szolnok	28	12	13	3	45	23	+22	49	
3	Jászapáti	28	15	3	10	54	34	+20	48	
4	Makó	28	13	8	7	44	34	+10	44 (Note: 3 points deducted)	
5	Soroksár	28	13	6	9	44	34	+10	45	
6	Nyíregyháza	28	12	9	7	48	30	+18	45	
7	Bőcs	28	13	5	10	39	40	−1	44	
8	Kazincbarcika	28	12	5	11	47	42	+5	41	
9	Kecskemét	28	9	11	8	46	49	−3	38	
10	Orosháza	28	9	9	10	51	46	+5	36	
11	Baktalórántháza	28	9	8	11	41	37	+4	35	
12	Vecsés	28	8	4	16	34	54	−20	28	
13	Karcag	28	8	4	16	36	63	−27	28	
14	Budafok (R)	28	6	6	16	29	51	−22	24	Relegation to Nemzeti Bajnokság III
15	Erzsébeti Spartacus (R)	28	3	2	23	19	76	−57	11	Relegation to Nemzeti Bajnokság III
16	Szentes (R)	0	0	0	0	0	0	0	0	Relegation to Nemzeti Bajnokság III

Source: Hungarian Football Federation (in Hungarian), Soccerway
Rules for classification: 1) Points; 2) Matches won; 3) Goal difference; 4) Goals scored; 5) Head-to-head points; 6) Head-to-head goal difference; 7) Head-to-head away goals scored; 8) Fair play ranking; 9) Drawing of lots.
(P) Promoted; (R) Relegated

== Top scorer ==
=== West ===
- 21 goals: Gábor Földes (Felcsút)
- 20 goals: Attila Korsós (Gyirmót)
- 17 goals: Károly Kovacsics (Felcsút)

=== East ===
- 17 goals: Norbert Palászhy (Vác)
- 14 goals: Roland Lengyel (Nyíregyháza)
- 13 goals: Attila Hadár (Makó)

== See also ==
- 2005–06 Magyar Kupa
- 2005–06 Nemzeti Bajnokság I
- 2005–06 Nemzeti Bajnokság III
