= László Wukovics =

Hungarian footballer

Personal information
- Full name: László Wukovics
- Date of birth: 22 January 1970 (age 56)
- Place of birth: Budapest, Hungary
- Height: 1.77 m (5 ft 10 in)
- Position: Striker

Youth career
- 1978: Úttörő Stadion
- 1978–1988: Ferencvárosi

Senior career*
Years	Team	Apps	(Gls)
1988–1994	Ferencvárosi	105	(46)
1994–1996	Újpest	47	(12)
1996–1997	Dunaújváros	19	(7)
1997–1999	III. Kerületi TVE	62	(20)
1999	Budapest Honvéd	12	(3)
2000	KF Tirana		
2000–2001	Csepel FC	15	(2)
2001–2002	Dabas FC	7	(0)
2004	Aszód FC		
2004	Gárdonyi VSC		
2005–2007	Mezöszilas		
2007–2008	Viadukt Biatorbágy	26	(40)
20xx–2013	Unione FC Budapest		
2013–	Balassagyarmat VSE		

International career
1991	Hungary U21	1	(0)
1992–1995	Hungary	3	(0)

Managerial career
- 2001–2002: Dabas FC
- 2005–20xx: Hegyvidék Focisuli
- Újbuda TC (youth)
- Ferencvárosi (youth)
- * Club domestic league appearances and goals

László Wukovics (born 22 January 1970) is a former Hungarian international footballer.
