= Cătălin Azoiței =

Romanian footballer (born 1968)

Personal information
- Full name: Cătălin Marian Azoiței
- Date of birth: 11 June 1968 (age 58)
- Place of birth: Baia Mare, Romania
- Height: 1.82 m (6 ft 0 in)
- Position: Midfielder

Youth career
- 1985–1992: FC Baia Mare

Senior career*
Years	Team	Apps	(Gls)
1992–1994	Pécsi MFC	45	(13)
1994–1995	Csepel SC	16	(1)
1995–1996	Győr	17	(4)
1996	Royal Antwerp	1	(0)
1996–1997	Pécsi MFC	32	(8)
1997–1998	Budapest Honvéd	11	(2)
1999	Nyíregyháza Spartacus	15	(1)
2000	Nagykanizsa	8	(1)
2003–2004	SV Stegersbach		
2006–2008	Semjénháza SE	26	(15)
2010	Tanakajd TC	28	(11)
- * Club domestic league appearances and goals

Cătălin Marian Azoiței (born 11 June 1968) is a Romanian former professional footballer who played as a midfielder.

== Early life ==
Azoiței was born in 1968 in Romania. He debuted for Romanian side CS Minaur Baia Mare at the age of eighteen.

== Career ==
In 1992, Azoiței signed for Hungarian side Pécsi MFC. In 1994, he signed for Hungarian side Csepel SC. In 1995, he signed for Hungarian side ETO FC Győr. In 1996, he signed for Belgian side Royal Antwerp. After that, he returned to Hungarian side Pécsi MFC. In 1997, he signed for Hungarian side Budapest Honvéd. In 1999, he signed for Hungarian side Nyíregyháza Spartacus FC. In 2000, he signed for Hungarian side Nagykanizsa FC. In 2003, he signed for Austrian side SV Stegersbach. In 2006, he signed for Hungarian side Semjénháza SE. In 2010, he signed for Hungarian side Tanakajd TC.

== Style of play ==
Azoiței mainly operated as a central midfielder. He also operated as a striker.

== Personal life ==
Azoiței has been married. He has a daughter.
