= 1994–95 Nemzeti Bajnokság I =

Nemzeti Bajnokság I
- Season: 1994–95
- Champions: Ferencváros
- Relegated: Nagykanizsa; EMDSZ Sopron
- Champions League: Ferencváros
- UEFA Cup: Újpest
- Cup Winners' Cup: Vác
- Intertoto Cup: Békéscsaba
- Matches: 240
- Goals: 683 (2.85 per match)
- Top goalscorer: Sándor Preisinger (21)

Statistics of Nemzeti Bajnokság I in the 1994–95 season.

== Overview ==
It was contested by 16 teams, and Ferencvárosi TC won the championship under coach Dezső Novák.

FTC won the campaign in the 28th round, after drawing 3–3 against Debreceni VSC at Üllői Út. The green and whites finished 7 points above their great rivals, Újpest.

Despite starting off the season better than FTC, even defeating them 3–0 at Üllői Út in Round 4, and managing to remain undefeated until Matchday 11, Újpest had a slip of form as they went on a 3-game losing streak in March, and suffered shock defeats in the last third of the season against DVSC, Kispest and Vác, thus enabling Ferencváros, who were undefeated between Matchday 20 and 29 to win their 25th national championship.

== League standings ==
Pos	Team	Pld	W	D	L	GF	GA	GD	Pts	Qualification or relegation
1	Ferencváros (C)	30	17	8	5	62	41	+21	59	Qualification for Champions League qualifying round
2	Újpest	30	15	7	8	57	34	+23	52	Qualification for UEFA Cup preliminary round
3	Debrecen	30	14	7	9	45	37	+8	49	
4	Kispest Honvéd	30	14	6	10	60	42	+18	48	
5	Békéscsaba	30	11	15	4	47	32	+15	48	Qualification for Intertoto Cup group stage
6	BVSC	30	14	4	12	51	46	+5	46	
7	Pécsi	30	12	6	12	38	43	−5	42	
8	Zalaegerszeg	30	12	6	12	49	56	−7	42	
9	Stadler	30	9	10	11	30	34	−4	37	
10	Vasas	30	10	7	13	38	45	−7	37	
11	Győr (Note: 3 points deducted)	30	11	5	14	42	40	+2	35	
12	Csepel	30	8	11	11	23	26	−3	35	
13	Vác (O)	30	8	11	11	37	44	−7	35	Cup Winners' Cup qualifying round and relegation play-offs
14	Parmalat (O)	30	9	7	14	44	50	−6	34	Qualification for relegation play-offs
15	Nagykanizsai Olajbányász SE (R)	30	7	6	17	24	57	−33	27	Relegation to Nemzeti Bajnokság II
16	EMDSZ Sopron (R)	30	6	10	14	36	56	−20	28	Relegation to Nemzeti Bajnokság II

Source: rsssf.com
(C) Champions; (O) Play-off winners; (R) Relegated

== Results ==
Home \ Away	BÉK	BVS	CSE	DEB	SOP	FTC	GYŐ	HON	NAG	PAR	PÉC	STA	VAS	VÁC	UTE	ZTE
Békéscsaba		1–0	1–1	3–3	1–1	5–2	3–1	3–3	1–0	1–0	4–2	0–2	2–1	0–0	0–0	0–0
BVSC	1–0		1–1	5–1	3–1	0–1	1–1	2–3	1–0	1–1	3–0	2–0	1–3	3–0	2–4	3–0
Csepel	1–1	2–4		0–1	0–0	1–2	1–0	1–2	2–0	1–0	0–1	0–1	2–0	1–0	1–1	2–1
Debrecen	1–1	3–0	1–0		1–0	2–0	1–2	2–1	3–1	1–2	0–0	1–0	0–3	2–1	1–0	3–1
EMDSZ Sopron	2–2	2–1	0–2	1–1		1–1	1–2	1–0	7–2	3–0	0–0	2–2	3–0	1–1	1–0	0–1
Ferencváros	1–1	4–1	1–0	3–3	2–2		1–4	3–2	2–1	2–3	3–0	2–0	1–1	5–0	0–3	3–0
Győr	2–2	1–3	0–0	1–3	4–0	1–1		1–1	1–2	4–1	1–2	4–0	1–3	1–0	2–0	0–3
Kispest Honvéd	2–1	2–0	1–1	0–1	2–0	3–4	1–2		3–1	3–1	0–0	2–0	2–0	4–0	4–0	5–1
Nagykanizsa	0–3	2–1	1–0	3–1	2–0	0–2	1–0	1–5		1–4	0–0	1–5	2–1	0–0	1–1	1–1
Parmalat	1–2	1–4	0–0	2–1	5–0	0–2	0–1	4–1	1–1		1–1	3–0	0–0	6–3	1–0	4–4
Pécs	2–1	4–2	0–1	2–1	4–3	1–2	1–0	2–0	3–0	2–0		0–1	1–2	0–2	0–2	3–0
Stadler	0–0	0–1	0–0	0–4	4–0	1–1	3–2	2–0	0–0	0–0	2–0		1–1	2–2	1–2	2–1
Vasas	0–4	1–2	3–0	1–1	2–1	2–4	0–2	2–2	2–0	1–0	3–0	0–0		0–2	3–5	1–0
Vác	0–1	0–2	0–0	0–0	1–1	1–1	1–0	1–3	3–0	4–0	2–2	1–1	1–1		2–0	5–2
Újpest	2–2	1–1	0–0	2–1	7–1	1–3	3–1	3–1	1–0	3–1	6–1	1–0	3–0	1–2		4–0
Zalaegerszeg	1–1	6–0	3–2	2–1	3–1	1–3	1–0	2–2	3–0	3–2	1–4	1–0	2–1	4–2	1–1	

Source: rsssf.com
Legend: Blue = home team win; Yellow = draw; Red = away team win.

== Relegation play-offs ==
Team 1	Agg.	Team 2	1st leg	2nd leg
Vác (I)	5–1	BKV Előre (II)	4–0	1–1
Salgótarján (II)	1–3	Parmalat (I)	0–1	1–2

== Statistical leaders ==
=== Top goalscorers ===
Rank	Scorer	Club	Goals
1	(Hungary) Sándor Preisinger	Zalaegerszegi TE	21
2	(Hungary) Kálmán Kovács	Kispest Honvéd FC	19
3	(Hungary) Antal Füle	Vác FC	15
3	(Hungary) Tamás Sándor	Debreceni VSC-Epona	15
5	(Hungary) Péter Lipcsei	Ferencvárosi TC	14
6	(Hungary) László Arany	Debreceni VSC-Epona	13
6	(Hungary) György Bognár	Budapesti VSC	13
8	(Hungary) Zoltán Bükszegi	Budapesti VSC	12
8	(Hungary) Gábor Egressy	Újpesti TE	12
8	(Romania) Sándor Kulcsár	Békéscsabai Előre	12

== Attendances ==
Average home league attendance top 3:

#	Club	Average
1	Ferencváros	11,133
2	Újpest	8,100
3	Nagykanizsa	7,500

== See also ==
- 1994–95 Magyar Kupa
