= Nagykanizsai Olajbányász SE =

Hungarian football club

- Full name: Nagykanizsai Olajbányász Sportegyesület
- Founded: 1945
- Dissolved: 2002
Home colours

Nagykanizsai Olajbányász SE is a defunct football club based in Nagykanizsa, Somogy County, Hungary.

== History ==
Nagykanizsai Olajbányász SE won the 1948–49 Nemzeti Bajnokság II season, as Nagykanizsai MAORT MSE, and gained promotion to the first division.

== Name changes ==
- Nagykanizsai MAORT Munkás SE: 1945 – 1949
- Zalai Olajmunkás Sport Egyesület: 1949 – 1951
- Nagykanizsai Bányász SK: 1951 – 1957
- Nagykanizsai Zrinyi Olajbánybányász SC: 1957 – 1959
- Nagykanizsai Bányász: 1959 – 1966
- Nagykanizsai Olajbányász SE: 1966 – 1997
- Nagykanizsai Olajbányász FC: 1997 – 2000
- Nagykanizsa-LinAir FC: 2000
- Nagykanizsa FC: 2000 – 2002
- Kögáz-Nagykanizsa FC: 2002

== Honours ==
- Nemzeti Bajnokság II:
  - Winners (3): 1948–49, 1981–82, 1993–94
- Nemzeti Bajnokság III:
  - Winners (2): 1943–44, 1972–73

== Seasons ==
The table below shows the seasons of Nagykanizsai Olajbányász SE.

Season	Tier	Club's name	Position	Pts
1945–46	2	Nagykanizsai MAORT SE	0 / 12	
1946–47	3	Nagykanizsai MAORT MSE	2 / 12	34
1947–48	3	Nagykanizsai MAORT MSE	1 / 14	44
1948–49	2	Nagykanizsai MAORT MSE	1 / 16	43
1949–50	1	Zalai Olajmunkás SE	14 / 16	15
1950	2	Olajmunkás SE (Nagykanizsa)	4 / 16	17
1951	2	Nagykanizsai Bányász	7 / 14	24
1952	2	Nagykanizsai Bányász	7 / 18	36
1953	2	Nagykanizsai Bányász	10 / 16	28
1954	2	Nagykanizsai Bányász	4 / 16	34
1955	2	Nagykanizsai Bányász	10 / 16	27
1956	2	Nagykanizsai Zrinyi Olajbánybányász SC (Nagykanizsai Bányász)	7 / 16	30
1957–58	2	Nagykanizsai Bányász SC	17 / 19	23
1958–59	3	Nagykanizsai Bányász	8 / 16	30
1959–60	3	Nagykanizsai Bányász SK	10 / 17	27
1960–61	3	Nagykanizsai Bányász	4 / 16	37
1961–62	3	Nagykanizsai Bányász	11 / 16	26
1962–63	3	Nagykanizsai Bányász	6 / 16	30
1963	4	Nagykanizsai Bányász	1 / 16	21
1964	4	Nagykanizsai Bányász	7 / 16	32
1965	4	Nagykanizsai Bányász	5 / 16	34
1966	4	Nagykanizsai Bányász	1 / 16	44
1967	3	Nagykanizsai Bányász SK	6 / 16	33
1968	3	Nagykanizsai Bányász	10 / 16	28
1969	3	Nagykanizsai Olajbányász SE	16 / 16	18
1970	4	Olajbányász SE	1 / 16	24
1970–71	4	Olajbányász SE Nagykanizsa	1 / 16	46
1971–72	3	Nagykanizsai Olajbányász SE	12 / 16	27
1972–73	3	Olajbányász SE	1 / 16	41
1973–74	2	Nagykanizsai Olajbányász SE	7 / 18	34
1974–75	2	Nagykanizsai Olajbányász	13 / 20	35
1975–76	2	Nagykanizsai Olajbányász SE	16 / 20	33
1976–77	2	Nagykanizsai Olajbányász	10 / 20	38
1977–78	2	Nagykanizsai Olajbányász SE	9 / 20	37
1978–79	2	Nagykanizsai Olajbányász	8 / 20	39
1979–80	2	Nagykanizsai Olajbányász SE	3 / 20	46
1980–81	2	Nagykanizsai Olajbányász SE	2 / 20	50
1981–82	2	Nagykanizsai Olajbányász SE	1 / 16	46
1982–83	2	Nagykanizsai Olajbányász SE	16 / 20	35
1983–84	2	Nagykanizsai Olajbányász SE	8 / 20	38
1984–85	2	Nagykanizsai Olajbányász	16 / 20	32
1985–86	2	Nagykanizsai Olajbányász	11 / 20	36
1986–87	2	Nagykanizsai Olajbányász SE	14 / 20	34
1987–88	2	Nagykanizsai Olajbányász	14 / 20	34
1988–89	2	Nagykanizsai Olajbányász SE	3 / 16	60
1989–90	2	Nagykanizsai Olajbányász SE	11 / 16	38
1990–91	2	Nagykanizsai Olajbányász SE	5 / 16	32
1991–92	2	Nagykanizsai Olajbányász SE	9 / 16	30
1992–93	2	Nagykanizsai Olajbányász SE	9 / 16	32
1993–94	2	Nagykanizsai Olajbányász SE	1 / 16	47
1994–95	1	Nagykanizsai Olajbányász SE	15 / 16	27
1995–96	2	Nagykanizsai Olajbányász SE	4 / 16	54
1996–97	2	Nagykanizsai Olajbányász SE	4 / 16	50
1997–98	2	Olajbányász FC Nagykanizsa	7 / 20	52
1998–99	2	Nagykanizsai Olajbányász FC	2 / 20	71
1999–2000	1	Nagykanizsa-LinAir FC	14 / 18	31
2000	1	Nagykanizsa FC	8 / 8	8
2000–01	2	Nagykanizsa FC	11 / 12	16
2001–02	2	Nagykanizsa FC	12 / 12	14
2001–02	2	Nagykanizsa FC	11 / 12	13

== Notable players ==
- (Bosnia and Herzegovina) Almir Filipovic
- (North Macedonia) Stefan Toleski
- (Romania) Cătălin Azoiței
- (Romania) Daniel Usvat
- (Serbia) Dragan Crnomarkovic
- (Hungary) József Farkas
- (Hungary) György Józsi
- (Hungary) György Kajdy
- (Hungary) Zsombor Kerekes
- (Hungary) István Szedlacsek
- (Hungary) István Tamás
- (Hungary) Géza Vlaszák
- (Hungary) Krisztián Zahorecz
