= Soproni FAC 1900 SE =

Hungarian football club

Soproni FAC 1900 Sportegyesület
- Founded: 1900
- Ground: Anger réti sporttelep
- Capacity: 1,000
- League: Győr-Moson-Sopron County Division I.
- Website: http://www.sfac1900.hu/

Soproni FAC 1900 SE is a Hungarian football club from the town of Sopron.

== History ==
Under the name EMDSZ Soproni LC, Anger réti SFAC debuted in the 1993–94 season of the Hungarian League and finished fourteenth.

On 7 June 2025, a derby took place in Sopron between Soproni FAC 1900 SE and SVSE-GYSEV in the 2024–25 Megyei Bajnokság II season. The match ended with a 2-1 victory for SVSE. Attila Barcza, Hungarian MEP, also entered the pitch wearing the FAC shirt.

== Name Changes ==
- 1900–1908: Soproni FC
- 1908–1930: Soproni Football és Athletikai Club
- 1930–1932: Soproni Football Club 1900
- 1932–1949: Soproni Football és Athletikai Club
- 1949–1950: Soproni Szakmaközi SFAC
- 1950–1951: Soproni Dolgozók Sport Egylete
- 1951–1957: Soproni Vörös Lobogó Selyemipar
- 1957–1978: Soproni FAC
- 1978–1991: Soproni SE
- 1991–1992: Soproni LC
- 1992–1996: EMDSZ-Soproni Labdarúgó Club
- 1996–1998: Soproni Futball és Atlétikai Club
- 1998–1999: Soproni Dreher FAC
- 1999–2006: Soproni FAC
- 2006–2017: Anger réti SFAC 1900 Sport Egyesület
- 2017– : Soproni FAC 1900 Sport Egyesület

== Honours ==
- Nemzeti Bajnokság II:
  - Runners-up (1): 1945
- Nemzeti Bajnokság III:
  - Winners (2): 1948–49, 1987–88

== Seasons ==
The table below shows the seasons of Soproni FAC 1900 SE.

Season	Tier	Club's name	Position	Pts
1908–09	2	Soproni FAC	4 / 5	4
1909–10	2	Soproni FAC	5 / 5	0
1910–11	2	Soproni FAC	2 / 4	5
1912–13	2	Soproni FAC	5 / 5	2
1918–19	2	Soproni FAC	6 / 6	0
1919–20	2	Soproni FAC	2 / 8	11
1920–21	2	Soproni FAC	4 / 8	16
1921–22	2	Soproni FAC	2 / 9	12
1922–23	2	Soproni FAC	7 / 10	15
1923–24	2	Soproni FAC	8 / 10	8
1924–25	2	Soproni FAC	10 / 11	10
1925–26	3	Soproni FAC	3 / 11	30
1926–27	3	Soproni FAC	1 / 6	20
1927–28	3	Soproni FAC	3 / 12	33
1928–29	3	Soproni FAC	2 / 9	26
1929–30	3	Soproni FAC	2 / 8	24
1930–31	3	Soproni FC 1900	1 / 8	24
1931–32	2	Soproni FC 1900	7 / 11	17
1932–33	2	Soproni FAC	8 / 12	21
1933–34	2	Soproni FAC	6 / 12	22
1934–35	2	Soproni FAC	10 / 12	19
1935–36	2	Soproni FAC	2 / 14	41
1936–37	2	Soproni FAC	7 / 13	23
1937–38	2	Soproni FAC	2 / 14	39
1938–39	2	Soproni FAC	3 / 14	35
1939–40	2	Soproni FAC	2 / 14	34
1940–41	2	Soproni FAC	10 / 14	23
1941–42	2	Soproni FAC	9 / 14	25
1942–43	2	Soproni FAC	12 / 12	12
1943–44	3	Soproni FAC	5 / 14	31
1944–45	2	Soproni FAC	7 / 14	10
1944–45	2	Soproni FAC	0 / 11	
1945	2	Soproni FAC	2 / 7	9
1945–46	2	Soproni FAC	13 / 14	11
1946–47	3	MÁV Soproni FAC	4 / 12	27
1947–48	3	Soproni FAC	9 / 16	29
1948–49	3	Soproni FAC	1 / 16	46
1949–50	2	Szakmaközi Soproni FAC	16 / 16	18
1950	3	Soproni DSE	5 / 17	20
1951	3	Soproni Vörös Lobogó Selyem	9 / 12	19
1952	3	Soproni Vörös Lobogó Selyemipar	10 / 14	21
1957	4	Soproni FAC	0 / 7	
1957–58	4	Soproni FAC	13 / 16	21
1958–59	4	Soproni FAC	12 / 16	23
1959–60	4	Soproni FAC	3 / 17	34
1960–61	4	Soproni FAC	6 / 17	33
1961–62	4	Soproni FAC	13 / 17	21
1962–63	4	Soproni FAC	12 / 17	20
1963	5	Soproni FAC	8 / 8	9
1964	5	Soproni FAC	14 / 16	21
1965	5	Soproni FAC	14 / 16	21
1966	5	Soproni FAC	10 / 16	25
1967	5	Soproni FAC	4 / 16	41
1968	5	Soproni FAC	4 / 16	38
1969	5	Soproni FAC	12 / 16	23
1970	5	Soproni FAC	11 / 16	11
1970–71	5	Soproni FAC	14 / 16	21
1971–72	5	Soproni FAC	14 / 16	20
1972–73	5	Soproni FAC	8 / 14	25
1973–74	5	Soproni FAC	12 / 14	18
1974–75	4	Soproni FAC	14 / 16	17
1978–79	2	Soproni SE	14 / 20	35
1979–80	2	Sopron SE	5 / 20	44
1980–81	2	Sopron SE	11 / 20	36
1981–82	2	Sopron SE	5 / 16	38
1982–83	2	Soproni SE	13 / 20	37
1983–84	2	Soproni SE	14 / 20	34
1984–85	2	Soproni SE	7 / 20	42
1985–86	2	Soproni SE	18 / 20	32
1986–87	3	Soproni SE	3 / 18	46
1987–88	3	Soproni SE	1 / 18	56
1988–89	2	Soproni SE	9 / 16	43
1989–90	2	Soproni SE	7 / 16	43
1990–91	2	Soproni LC	12 / 16	26
1991–92	2	Soproni LC	6 / 16	32
1992–93	2	EMDSZ-Soproni LC	2 / 16	37
1993–94	1	EMDSZ-Soproni LC	14 / 16	22
1994–95	1	EMDSZ-Soproni LC	16 / 16	25
1995–96	2	EMDSZ-Soproni LC	8 / 16	48
1996–97	2	Soproni FAC	8 / 16	45
1997–98	2	Soproni FAC	8 / 20	52
1998–99	2	Soproni Dreher FAC	20 / 20	9
1999–00	6	Soproni FAC	10 / 16	39
2000–01	6	Soproni FAC	16 / 16	12
2001–02	7	Soproni FAC	12 / 12	1
2002–03	7	Soproni FAC	6 / 14	45
2003–04	7	Soproni FAC	1 / 15	64
2004–05	7	Soproni FAC	1 / 12	58
2005–06	6	Soproni FAC	1 / 16	74
2006–07	6	Anger réti SFAC 1900 SE	5 / 16	48
2007–08	6	Anger réti SFAC 1900 SE	5 / 18	60
2008–09	6	Anger réti SFAC 1900 SE	7 / 15	49
2009–10	6	Anger réti SFAC 1900 SE	1 / 10	45
2010–11	6	Anger réti SFAC 1900 SE	1 / 8	66
2011–12	6	Anger réti SFAC 1900 SE	7 / 16	46
2012–13	6	Soproni FAC	13 / 16	27
2013–14	6	Soproni FAC	3 / 8	46
2014–15	6	Soproni FAC 1900	8 / 16	40
2015–16	6	Anger réti SFAC 1900 SE	1 / 16	88
2016–17	5	Soproni FAC 1900 SE	1 / 15	74
2017–18	4	Soproni FAC 1900 SE	7 / 16	41
2018–19	4	Soproni FAC 1900 SE	15 / 16	4
2019–20	4	Soproni FAC 1900 SE	16 / 16	3
2020–21	4	Soproni FAC 1900 SE	12 / 16	32
2021–22	4	Soproni FAC 1900 SE	9 / 16	38
2022–23	4	Soproni FAC 1900 SE	9 / 15	32
2023–24	5	Soproni FAC 1900 SE	11 / 13	10
2024–25	5	Soproni FAC 1900 SE	8 / 10	24
2025–26	5	Soproni FAC 1900 SE	11 / 12	26
