= 1997–98 Nemzeti Bajnokság II =

Nemzeti Bajnokság II
- Season: 1997–98
- Champions: Nyíregyháza
- Promoted: Nyíregyháza; Dunaferr; III. Kerület
- Relegated: Szeged-Dorozsma; Paks; Dorog; Csepel SC

The 1997–98 Nemzeti Bajnokság II was the 100th season of the Nemzeti Bajnokság II, the second tier of the Hungarian football league.

== Teams ==
The following teams have changed division since the 1996–97 season.

=== Team changes ===
==== To NB II ====
Relegated from 1996–97 Nemzeti Bajnokság I	Promoted from 1996–97 Nemzeti Bajnokság III
▼III. Kerület ▼ Pécs ▼ Csepel	▲ Komló (Dráva) ▲ Dorog (Duna) ▲ Tiszaújváros (Tisza)

==== From NB II ====
Promoted to 1997–98 Nemzeti Bajnokság I	Relegated to 1997–98 Nemzeti Bajnokság III
▲ Gázszer (West) ▲ Tiszakécske (East) ▲ Diósgyőr (East)	▼ Eger (East) ▼ Tiszafüred (East) ▼ Hajdúnánás (East) ▼ Kazincbarcika (East) ▼ Hatvan (East) ▼ Tatabánya (East) ▼ Veszprém (West) ▼ Soroksári TE (West) ▼ Budafok (West) ▼BKV Előre (West) ▼ Százhalombatta (West)

=== Stadium and locations ===
Location of teams in 1997–98 Nemzeti Bajnokság II

Following is the list of clubs competing in the league, with their location, stadium and stadium capacity.

Team	Location	Stadium	Capacity
III. Kerület	Budapest (Óbuda)	Hévízi úti Stadion	914
Csepel	Budapest (Csepel)	Béke téri Stadion	12,000
Dorog	Dorog	Buzánszky Jenő Stadion	5,000
Dunaferr	Dunaújváros	Kohász Stadion	TBA
Érd	Érd	Ercsi úti pálya	3,500
Hajdúszoboszló	Hajdúszoboszló	Bocskai Stadion	3,500
Kaposvár	Kaposvár	Rákóczi Stadion	7,000
Kecskemét	Kecskemét	Széktói Stadion	6,320
Komló	Komló	Bányász Stadion	10,000
Nagykanizsa	Nagykanizsa	Olajbányász Sporttelep	7,000
Nyíregyháza	Nyíregyháza	Városi Stadion	10,300
Paks	Paks	Atomerőmű Sporttelep	3,500
Pécs	Pécs	Stadion PMFC	7,000
Salgótarján	Salgótarján	Tó-strandi Sporttelep	TBA
Matáv Sopron	Sopron	Matáv Stadion	3,000
Soproni FAC	Sopron	Anger réti Sprottelep	1,000
Szeged-Dorozsma	Szeged	Felső Tisza-parti Stadion	15,000
Szolnok	Szolnok	Véső utcai Sportpálya	6,000
Tiszaújváros	Tiszaújváros	Városi Sport Park	4,000
Tiszavasvári	Tiszavasvári	Városi Sporttelep	TBA

== League table ==
Pos	Team	Pld	W	D	L	GF	GA	GD	Pts	Promotion or relegation
1	Nyíregyháza (C, P)	38	24	10	4	66	24	+42	82	Promotion to Nemzeti Bajnokság I
2	Dunaferr (P)	38	24	8	6	61	30	+31	80	Promotion to Nemzeti Bajnokság I
3	III. Kerület (O, P)	38	22	8	8	79	37	+42	74	Qualification to promotion play-offs
4	Matáv Sopron	38	20	7	11	66	37	+29	67	Qualification to promotion play-offs
5	Érd	38	16	12	10	65	47	+18	60	
6	Kaposvár	38	15	10	13	45	54	−9	55	
7	Nagykanizsa	38	16	4	18	51	52	−1	52	
8	Soproni FAC	38	13	13	12	40	44	−4	52	
9	Salgótarján	38	15	7	16	40	45	−5	52	
10	Hajdúszoboszló	38	13	12	13	44	35	+9	51	
11	Szeged-Dorozsma (R)	38	13	11	14	56	63	−7	50	Relegation to Csongrád county Football League III
12	Tiszavasvári	38	12	12	14	35	44	−9	48	
13	Pécs	38	11	13	14	33	31	+2	46	
14	Kecskemét	38	13	7	18	36	50	−14	46	
15	Paks (Note: Paks was deducted 2 points due to Miklós Kiss played after getting three yellow cards.) (R)	38	11	14	13	38	37	+1	45	Withdrawn - Relegation to Nemzeti Bajnokság III
16	Komló	38	12	7	19	38	63	−25	43	
17	Szolnok	38	10	12	16	42	59	−17	42	Qualification to relegation play-offs
18	Tiszaújváros	38	10	6	22	43	71	−28	36	Qualification to relegation play-offs
19	Dorog (R)	38	8	10	20	37	52	−15	34	Relegation to Nemzeti Bajnokság III
20	Csepel (R)	38	6	9	23	27	67	−40	27	Relegation to Nemzeti Bajnokság III

Source: (in Hungarian)
Rules for classification: 1st points; 2nd overall wins; 3rd goal difference; 4th head-to-head points; 5th head-to-head goal difference; 6th head-to-head away goals scored; 7th fair-play points; 8th drawing of lots
(C) Champions; (O) Play-off winners; (P) Promoted; (R) Relegated

== Relegation play-offs ==
=== Overview ===
Team 1	Agg.	Team 2	1st leg	2nd leg
Szolnok	2–2	Soroksár	1–0	1–2
Tatabánya	5–2	Tiszaújváros	2–0	3–2

== See also ==
- 1997–98 Magyar Kupa
- 1997–98 Nemzeti Bajnokság I
- 1997–98 Nemzeti Bajnokság III
