= 1996–97 Nemzeti Bajnokság II =

Nemzeti Bajnokság II
- Season: 1996–97
- Champions: Gázszer FC, Tiszakécske FC
- Promoted: Gázszer FC, Tiszakécske FC
- Relegated: Százhalombatta (West); Pécs (West); BKV Előre (West); Budafok (West); Soroksár (West); Veszprém (West); Balatonfüred (West); Tatabánya (West); Hatvan (East); Kazinbarcika (East); Kecskemét SC(East); Hajdúnánás (East); Tiszafüred (East); Eger (East); Sényő (East)

The 1996–97 Nemzeti Bajnokság II was the 99th season of the Nemzeti Bajnokság II, the second tier of the Hungarian football league.

== League table ==
=== Western group ===
Pos	Team	Pld	W	D	L	GF	GA	GD	Pts	Promotion or relegation
1	Gázszer FC-Agárd	30	20	8	2	61	19	+42	68	Promotion to Nemzeti Bajnokság I
2	Dunaferr SE	30	17	10	3	54	21	+33	61	
3	Érdi VSE	30	14	9	7	46	32	+14	51	
4	Nagykanizsai Olajbányász SE	30	14	8	8	47	36	+11	50	
5	Rákóczi-Kaposcukor FC	30	12	13	5	39	28	+11	49	
6	Matáv SC Sopron	30	13	9	8	40	27	+13	48	
7	Paksi ASE	30	12	10	8	46	28	+18	46	
8	Soproni FAC	30	12	9	9	40	33	+7	45	
9	Százhalombattai FC	30	11	11	8	39	35	+4	44	Relegation
10	Pécsi '96 FC	30	11	8	11	29	30	−1	41	Relegation
11	BKV Előre SC	30	11	8	11	40	45	−5	41	Relegation
12	Budafoki LC	30	6	14	10	29	32	−3	32	Relegation
13	Soroksári TE	30	5	8	17	39	64	−25	20 (Note: 3 points deducted due to illegal play of János Nagy)	Relegation
14	Jutas Veszprém HFK	30	3	9	18	28	55	−27	18	Relegation
15	Balatonfüredi SC	30	4	4	22	20	68	−48	16	Relegation
16	Lombard FC Tatabánya	30	3	6	21	24	68	−44	15	Relegation

=== Eastern group ===
Pos	Team	Pld	W	D	L	GF	GA	GD	Pts	Promotion or relegation
1	Tiszakécske FC-Eurobusz	28	18	2	8	53	24	+29	56	Promotion to Nemzeti Bajnokság I
2	Diósgyőri FC	28	15	7	6	35	23	+12	52	
3	Nyíregyházi FC	28	14	9	5	39	19	+20	51	
4	Kabai Cukor FC Hajdúszoboszló	28	13	10	5	40	23	+17	49	
5	Szeged-Dorozsma FC	28	13	9	6	36	26	+10	48	
6	Szolnoki MÁV-Neusiedler	28	13	6	9	38	31	+7	45	
7	Tiszavasvári Alkaloida SE	28	12	8	8	34	27	+7	44	
8	Salgótarjáni BTC	28	10	10	8	29	28	+1	40	
9	Kecskeméti TE	28	11	6	11	31	32	−1	39	
10	FC Hatvan	28	9	9	10	37	32	+5	36	Relegation
11	Kazincbarcikai SC	28	8	7	13	32	41	−9	31	Relegation
12	Kecskeméti SC-RSC	28	6	10	12	27	33	−6	28	Relegation
13	Hajdúnánási FC-Tedej	28	6	5	17	18	50	−32	23	Relegation
14	Tiszafüredi VSE-CityGas	28	6	4	18	23	47	−24	22	Relegation
15	FC Eger-Egertej	28	3	4	21	14	50	−36	13	Relegation
16	Sényő-PA-NA Bt. (Note: Withdrew)	0	0	0	0	0	0	0	0	Relegation

== Play-offs ==
=== Relegation play-off ===
III. ker. TVE - Diósgyőri FC 1–0, 0–2

Dunaferr SE - Ecker-Stadler 2–2, 1–2

=== Promotion play-off ===
Százhalombatta - Kecskeméti TE 0–1, 1–4

== See also ==
- 1996–97 Magyar Kupa
- 1996–97 Nemzeti Bajnokság I
- 1996–97 Nemzeti Bajnokság III
