= 2001–02 Nemzeti Bajnokság II =

Nemzeti Bajnokság II
- Season: 2001–02
- Champions: BFC Siófok; Békéscsaba 1912 Előre
- Promoted: BFC Siófok (West); Békéscsaba 1912 Előre (East)
- Relegated: Dorogi FC (West); Nagykanizsa FC (West); Erzsébeti Spartacus MTK LE (East)

The 2001–02 Nemzeti Bajnokság II was the 104th season of the Nemzeti Bajnokság II, the second tier of the Hungarian football league.

== League table ==
=== First round ===
==== Western group ====
| Pos | Team | Pld | W | D | L | GF | GA | GD | Pts | Promotion or relegation |
|---|---|---|---|---|---|---|---|---|---|---|
| 1 | Celldömölki VSE | 22 | 15 | 3 | 4 | 47 | 19 | +28 | 48 | Promotion to Nemzeti Bajnokság I |
| 2 | Siófok FC | 22 | 13 | 1 | 8 | 37 | 21 | +16 | 40 | |
| 3 | Marcali IFC | 22 | 11 | 6 | 5 | 48 | 29 | +19 | 39 | |
| 4 | Kaposvári Rákóczi | 22 | 11 | 5 | 6 | 41 | 25 | +16 | 38 | |
| 5 | Pécsi Mecsek FC | 22 | 11 | 5 | 6 | 37 | 31 | +6 | 38 | |
| 6 | Lombard FC Tatabánya | 22 | 11 | 4 | 7 | 37 | 21 | +16 | 37 | |
| 7 | BTK Bükfürdő (Note: 4 points deducted from Bükfürdő) | 22 | 8 | 6 | 8 | 21 | 32 | −11 | 30 | |
| 8 | Hévíz | 22 | 8 | 5 | 9 | 40 | 42 | −2 | 29 | |
| 9 | Százhalombattai FC | 22 | 8 | 5 | 9 | 30 | 32 | −2 | 29 | |
| 10 | Pápai ELC | 22 | 6 | 7 | 9 | 29 | 36 | −7 | 25 | |
| 11 | Nagykanizsa FC | 22 | 3 | 4 | 15 | 22 | 54 | −32 | 13 | Relegation |
| 12 | Dorogi FC | 22 | 1 | 1 | 20 | 14 | 61 | −47 | 4 | Relegation |

==== Eastern group ====
| Pos | Team | Pld | W | D | L | GF | GA | GD | Pts |
|---|---|---|---|---|---|---|---|---|---|
| 1 | Békéscsabai Előre FC | 22 | 14 | 5 | 3 | 49 | 23 | +26 | 47 |
| 2 | Rákospalotai EAC | 22 | 10 | 7 | 5 | 41 | 23 | +18 | 37 |
| 3 | Szolnoki MÁV FC | 22 | 10 | 6 | 6 | 39 | 27 | +12 | 36 |
| 4 | Diósgyőri VTK | 22 | 11 | 3 | 8 | 35 | 25 | +10 | 36 |
| 5 | Csepel SC | 22 | 10 | 4 | 8 | 46 | 38 | +8 | 34 |
| 6 | BKV Előre SC | 22 | 8 | 7 | 7 | 36 | 33 | +3 | 31 |
| 7 | FC Eger | 22 | 8 | 6 | 8 | 32 | 37 | −5 | 30 |
| 8 | Nyírség-Spartacus FC | 22 | 8 | 3 | 11 | 40 | 42 | −2 | 27 |
| 9 | Fóti SE | 22 | 6 | 9 | 7 | 33 | 37 | −4 | 27 |
| 10 | Kecskeméti FC | 22 | 6 | 7 | 9 | 35 | 43 | −8 | 25 |
| 11 | Monor SE | 22 | 6 | 3 | 13 | 29 | 57 | −28 | 21 |
| 12 | Erzsébeti SMTK | 22 | 2 | 6 | 14 | 28 | 58 | −30 | 12 |

=== Main round ===
==== Western group ====
| Pos | Team | Pld | W | D | L | GF | GA | GD | Pts | Promotion or relegation |
|---|---|---|---|---|---|---|---|---|---|---|
| 1 | Siófok FC | 32 | 21 | 2 | 9 | 63 | 33 | +30 | 65 | Promotion to Nemzeti Bajnokság I |
| 2 | Celldömölki VSE | 32 | 20 | 5 | 7 | 69 | 34 | +35 | 65 | |
| 3 | Kaposvári Rákóczi | 32 | 16 | 8 | 8 | 60 | 36 | +24 | 56 | |
| 4 | Pécsi Mecsek FC | 32 | 16 | 7 | 9 | 48 | 42 | +6 | 55 | |
| 5 | Marcali IFC | 32 | 13 | 6 | 13 | 59 | 57 | +2 | 45 | |
| 6 | Lombard FC Tatabánya | 32 | 12 | 4 | 16 | 50 | 46 | +4 | 40 | |
| 7 | Hévíz | 32 | 13 | 7 | 12 | 58 | 55 | +3 | 46 | |
| 8 | Pápai ELC | 32 | 12 | 10 | 10 | 54 | 45 | +9 | 46 | |
| 9 | Százhalombatta | 32 | 12 | 9 | 11 | 42 | 42 | 0 | 45 | |
| 10 | Büki TK-Bükfürdő | 32 | 13 | 9 | 10 | 41 | 46 | −5 | 44 (Note: 4 ponts deducted from Büki TK because Olivér Pusztai played illegally in the relegation play-off against Monor.) | |
| 11 | Dorogi FC | 32 | 4 | 2 | 26 | 20 | 79 | −59 | 14 | Relegation to Nemzeti Bajnokság III |
| 12 | Nagykanizsa FC | 32 | 3 | 5 | 24 | 32 | 81 | −49 | 14 | Relegation to Nemzeti Bajnokság III |

==== Eastern group ====
| Pos | Team | Pld | W | D | L | GF | GA | GD | Pts | Promotion or relegation |
|---|---|---|---|---|---|---|---|---|---|---|
| 1 | Békéscsabai Előre FC | 32 | 18 | 7 | 7 | 65 | 40 | +25 | 61 | Promotion to Nemzeti Bajnokság I |
| 2 | Diósgyőri VTK | 32 | 16 | 6 | 10 | 57 | 37 | +20 | 54 | |
| 3 | Szolnoki MÁV FC | 32 | 15 | 9 | 8 | 61 | 38 | +23 | 54 | |
| 4 | Csepel-AT. | 32 | 15 | 6 | 11 | 63 | 53 | +10 | 51 | |
| 5 | Rákospalotai EAC | 32 | 13 | 8 | 11 | 53 | 40 | +13 | 47 | |
| 6 | BKV Előre | 32 | 10 | 8 | 14 | 51 | 65 | −14 | 38 | |
| 7 | Nyírség-Spartacus FC | 32 | 15 | 6 | 11 | 60 | 50 | +10 | 51 | |
| 8 | Fóti SE | 32 | 11 | 12 | 9 | 59 | 48 | +11 | 45 | |
| 9 | Eger | 32 | 11 | 8 | 13 | 53 | 60 | −7 | 41 | |
| 10 | Kecskeméti FC | 32 | 10 | 9 | 13 | 55 | 60 | −5 | 39 | |
| 11 | Monor-Sáma SE | 32 | 9 | 5 | 18 | 40 | 74 | −34 | 32 | |
| 12 | ESMTK | 32 | 2 | 10 | 20 | 42 | 94 | −52 | 16 | Relegation to Nemzeti Bajnokság II |

== Relegation play-off ==
Dorogi FC (West) - Monor Sáma SE (East) 0–1, 2–2

== See also ==
- 2001–02 Magyar Kupa
- 2001–02 Nemzeti Bajnokság I
- 2001–02 Nemzeti Bajnokság III
