= FC Nagykanizsa =

Hungarian football club

- Full name: Nagykanizsa Futball Club
- Founded: 1866; 160 years ago 1912; football department
- Ground: Olajbányász Sporttelep
- Capacity: 7,000
- Manager: Jeney Gyula
- League: NB II
- 2025–26: NB III; Southwest, 1st of 16
- Website: fcnagykanizsa.hu
Home colours	Away colours

FC Nagykanizsa, a team from Nagykanizsa, is Hungary's oldest sports club, founded in 1866. The football department was established in 1912.

== Name changes ==
- 1945 – 1949: Nagykanizsai MAORT Munkás SE
- 1945 – 1949: Olajmunkás SE
- 1949 – 1951: Nagykanizsai Bányász SK
- 1951 – 1957: Nagykanizsai Zrinyi Olajbánybányász SC
- 1957 – 1959: Nagykanizsai Bányász
- 1959 – 1966: Nagykanizsai Olajbányász SE
- 1966 – 1996: Olajbányász Futball Club Nagykanizsa
- 1996 – 1998: 1. Futball Club Nagykanizsa
- 1998 – 2000: Nagykanizsa-LinAir FC
- 2000: Nagykanizsa FC
- 2000 – 2002: Kögáz-Nagykanizsa FC

== History ==
Nagykanizsa FC debuted in the 1994–95 season of the Hungarian First League and finished fifteenth. At the end of the 2025–26 season, FC Nagykanizsa secured promotion to NB II.

== Honours ==
- Nemzeti Bajnokság III:
  - Winners (2): 2024–25, 2025–26
- Megyei Bajnokság I:
  - Winners (1): 2017–18

== Current squad ==
Note: Flags indicate national team as defined under FIFA eligibility rules; some limited exceptions apply. Players may hold more than one non-FIFA nationality.

No.	Pos.	Nation	Player
2	DF	HUN	Miklós Magyar
4	DF	HUN	Zsombor Puskás
5	MF	HUN	Bertalan Kapornai
6	MF	HUN	Rabil Godzsajev-Telmán
7	DF	HUN	Dominik Varga
8	MF	HUN	Attila Lőrincz
9	FW	HUN	Richárd Zsolnai
11	FW	HUN	Vilmos Jován
12	MF	HUN	Péter Kovács
16	FW	HUN	Milán Ekker
17	FW	HUN	Bence Lőrincz
18	MF	HUN	Máté Pintér
19	DF	HUN	Krisztián Szanyi
20	MF	SVK	Bence Kovács

No.	Pos.	Nation	Player
21	MF	HUN	Péter Varga
27	MF	SVK	Matúš Kucman
30	DF	HUN	Zétény Garai
31	FW	HUN	Patrik Varga
44	DF	HUN	Raúl Stefan
55	DF	HUN	Milán Horváth
63	GK	HUN	Dániel Mikler
75	FW	HUN	Máté Kiss
77	MF	HUN	Máté Szabó
80	MF	HUN	Marcell Major
83	GK	HUN	Dominik Gaál
97	FW	UKR	Yaroslav Gelesh
99	GK	HUN	Dávid Mészáros
—	DF	HUN	Levente Márta
—	MF	HUN	Martin Ebot

== Seasons ==
The table below shows the seasons of FC Nagykanizsa.

Season	Tier	Club's name	Position	Pts
1919–20	2	Nagykanizsai TE	1 / 5	6
1920–21	2	Nagykanizsai TE	3 / 8	20
1921–22	2	Nagykanizsai TE	2 / 8	14
1922–23	2	Nagykanizsai TE	3 / 10	20
1923–24	2	Nagykanizsai TE	10 / 10	-
1924–25	2	Nagykanizsai TE	2 / 6	13
1925–26	2	Nagykanizsai TE	1 / 9	27
1926–27	2	Nagykanizsai TE	6 / 12	25
1927–28	2	Nagykanizsai TE	6 / 9	14
1928–29	2	Nagykanizsai TE	6 / 10	17
1929–30	2	Nagykanizsai TE	4 / 12	28
1930–31	2	Nagykanizsai TE	4 / 12	30
1931–32	2	Nagykanizsai TE	2 / 12	31
1932–33	2	Nagykanizsai TE	1 / 10	
1933–34	2	Nagykanizsai TE	3 / 11	28
1934–35	2	Nagykanizsai TE	5 / 12	25
1935–36	2	Nagykanizsai TE	4 / 12	29
1936–37	2	Nagykanizsai TE	6 / 12	23
1937–38	2	Nagykanizsai TE	8 / 12	18
1938–39	3	Nagykanizsai TE	6 / 12	25
1939–40	3	Zrinyi MNTE	2 / 12	31
1940–41	4	Zrinyi MNTE	9 / 14	22
1941–42	4	Zrínyi Miklós Nagykanizsai TE	10 / 12	15
1942–43	4	Zrínyi Miklós Nagykanizsai TE	2 / 8	12
1943–44	3	Nagykanizsai Zrinyi MTE	3 / 13	34
1944–45	2	Nagykanizsai Zrínyi Miklós TE	4 / 14	9
1944–45	2	Nagykanizsai Zrínyi Miklós TE	0 / 12	
1945–46	2	Nagykanizsai TE	0 / 12	
1946–47	3	Nagykanizsai TE	12 / 12	9
1947–48	4	Nagykanizsai TE	3 / 10	22
1948–49	4	Nagykanizsai TE	4 / 16	44
1949–50	4	Nagykanizsai Magasépítési TE	1 / 16	49
1950	3	Nagykanizsai Építők	4 / 15	19
1951	3	Nagykanizsai Építők	3 / 12	26
1952	3	Nagykanizsai Építők	3 / 12	32
1953	3	Nagykanizsai Építők	5 / 16	38
1954	3	Nagykanizsai Építők	4 / 16	46
1955	3	Nagykanizsai Építők	6 / 14	28
1956	3	Nagykanizsai Építők	5 / 14	29
1957	3	Nagykanizsai Építők	1 / 7	20
1957–58	3	Nagykanizsai TE Építők	10 / 16	29
1958–59	4	Nagykanizsai Építők	9 / 14	20
1959–60	4	Nagykanizsai Építők	12 / 16	24
1960–61	4	Nagykanizsai TE	12 / 18	21
1961–62	4	Nagykanizsai TE	10 / 16	24
1962–63	4	Nagykanizsai TE	8 / 16	28
1963	5	Nagykanizsai TE	12 / 18	8
1964	5	Nagykanizsai TE	13 / 18	20
1965	5	Nagykanizsai TE	12 / 18	26
1966	5	Nagykanizsai TE	14 / 16	17
1969	4	MÁV Nagykanizsai TE	3 / 17	38
1970	4	MÁV Nagykanizsai TE	6 / 16	16
1970–71	4	MÁV Nagykanizsai TE	7 / 16	31
1971–72	4	MÁV Nagykanizsai TE	9 / 16	31
1972–73	4	MÁV Nagykanizsai TE	13 / 16	25
1973–74	4	MÁV Nagykanizsai TE	8 / 16	32
1974–75	4	MÁV Nagykanizsai TE	5 / 16	37
1975–76	4	MÁV Nagykanizsai TE	8 / 16	29
1976–77	4	MÁV Nagykanizsai TE	1 / 14	43
1977–78	3	MÁV Nagykanizsai TE	5 / 20	44
1978–79	2	MÁV Nagykanizsai TE	11 / 20	38
1979–80	2	MÁV Nagykanizsa TE	18 / 20	30
1980–81	3	MÁV Nagykanizsai TE	5 / 18	46
1981–82	4	MÁV Nagykanizsai TE	1 / 16	44
1982–83	4	MÁV Nagykanizsai TE	1 / 16	49
1983–84	3	MÁV Nagykanizsai TE	15 / 18	28
1984–85	4	MÁV Nagykanizsai TE	1 / 16	51
1985–86	3	MÁV Nagykanizsai TE	10 / 18	33
1986–87	3	MÁV Nagykanizsa TE	4 / 16	32
1987–88	3	MÁV Nagykanizsai TE	6 / 16	31
1988–89	3	MÁV Nagykanizsai TE	11 / 16	38
1989–90	3	MÁV Nagykanizsai TE	6 / 16	40
1990–91	3	MÁV Nagykanizsai TE	9 / 16	26
1991–92	3	MÁV Nagykanizsai TE	15 / 16	19
1992–93	4	MÁV Nagykanizsai TE	5 / 18	40
1993–94	4	MÁV Nagykanizsai TE	1 / 17	48
1994–95	3	MÁV Nagykanizsai TE	16 / 16	23
1995–96	4	MÁV Nagykanizsai TE	8 / 18	46
1996–97	4	MÁV Nagykanizsai TE	1 / 18	73
1997–98	4	MÁV Nagykanizsai TE	9 / 16	40
1998–99	4	MÁV Nagykanizsa TE	10 / 16	40
1999–2000	4	MÁV Nagykanizsai TE	6 / 16	43
2000	3	MÁV Nagykanizsai TE	5 / 8	19
2002–03	8	MÁV Nagykanizsai TE	1 / 9	48
2003–04	8	Nagykanizsai TE 1866	2 / 10	47
2004–05	7	MÁV Nagykanizsai TE 1866	1 / 12	54
2005–06	5	Nagykanizsai TE 1866	1 / 16	86
2006–07	4	NTE 1866 MÁV	1 / 16	76
2007–08	3	NTE 1866	14 / 18	37
2008–09	3	Nagykanizsai TE 1866	3 / 16	58
2009–10	3	Nagykanizsai TE 1866-Horváth MÉH	6 / 14	41
2010–11	3	Nagykanizsai TE 1866-Horváth Méh	7 / 16	42
2011–12	3	Nagykanizsai TE 1866-Horváth Méh	12 / 15	32
2012–13	3	Nagykanizsai TE 1866	11 / 14	25
2013–14	4	Nagykanizsa LE	8 / 16	43
2014–15	4	Nagykanizsai LE	7 / 16	48
2015–16	4	Nagykanizsai LE	6 / 14	46
2016–17	4	UFC Nagykanizsa	1 / 15	72
2017–18	4	FC Nagykanizsa	1 / 16	80
2018–19	3	FC Nagykanizsa	6 / 16	43
2019–20	3	FC Nagykanizsa	7 / 16	28
2020–21	3	FC Nagykanizsa	4 / 20	66
2021–22	3	FC Nagykanizsa	9 / 20	53
2022–23	3	FC Nagykanizsa	3 / 20	87
2023–24	3	FC Nagykanizsa	3 / 16	61
2024–25	3	FC Nagykanizsa	1 / 16	74
2025–26	3	FC Nagykanizsa	1 / 16	69
