= 2007–08 Debreceni VSC season =

Debrecen
2007–08 season
- Manager: András Herczeg
- Stadium: Oláh Gábor utcai Stadion
- Nemzeti Bajnokság I: 2nd
- Magyar Kupa: Winners
- Ligakupa: Autumn season: Semi-finals; Spring season: Winners; Final: Runners-up
- Szuperkupa: Winners
- UEFA Champions League: Second qualifying round
Home colours

The 2007–08 season was Debreceni Vasutas Sport Club's 15th consecutive season in the Nemzeti Bajnokság I and 105th year in existence as a football club. In addition to the domestic league, Debrecen participated in this season's editions of the Magyar Kupa, the Ligakupa, the Szuperkupa and the UEFA Champions League.

== Squad ==
Note: Flags indicate national team as defined under FIFA eligibility rules; some limited exceptions apply. Players may hold more than one non-FIFA nationality.

No.	Pos.	Nation	Player
1	GK	SRB	Vukašin Poleksić
2	DF	HUN	István Szűcs
3	DF	HUN	Csaba Szatmári
4	DF	HUN	Leandro
5	DF	SRB	Dragan Vukmir
6	DF	HUN	Zoltán Takács
7	MF	HUN	Tibor Dombi
8	FW	HUN	Zsombor Kerekes
9	MF	HUN	Tamás Sándor
10	FW	SRB	Igor Bogdanović
11	FW	HUN	Milán Faggyas
12	GK	HUN	János Balogh
13	DF	HUN	Péter Bíró
14	FW	HUN	Gergely Rudolf
16	DF	HUN	Ádám Komlósi
17	MF	HUN	Norbert Mészáros

No.	Pos.	Nation	Player
20	MF	HUN	Róbert Nagy
21	DF	HUN	Marcell Fodor
22	DF	HUN	Csaba Bernáth
23	FW	HUN	Péter Szilágyi
24	GK	HUN	Norbert Csernyánszki
27	MF	HUN	Gábor Demjén
28	DF	HUN	Zoltán Nagy
29	MF	HUN	István Spitzmüller
30	MF	HUN	Zoltán Kiss
32	FW	MKD	Aco Stojkov
37	MF	BRA	Lucas
40	FW	CMR	Dorge Kouemaha
47	DF	HUN	Péter Máté
55	MF	HUN	Péter Szakály
77	MF	HUN	Péter Czvitkovics
87	GK	HUN	István Verpecz

== Competitions ==
=== Overview ===
Competition	First match	Last match	Starting round	Final position	Record							
Competition	First match	Last match	Starting round	Final position	Pld	W	D	L	GF	GA	GD	Win %
Nemzeti Bajnokság I	22 July 2007	31 May 2008	Matchday 1	2nd	30	19	7	4	67	29	+38	63.33
Magyar Kupa	26 September 2007	4 June 2008	Round of 32	Winners	9	8	0	1	38	11	+27	88.89
Ligakupa (Autumn season)	15 August 2007	14 November 2007	Group stage	Semi-finals	10	5	3	2	17	12	+5	50.00
Ligakupa (Spring season)	30 November 2007	7 May 2008	Group stage	Advanced as Winners	12	8	2	2	28	11	+17	66.67
Ligakupa (Grand final)	14 May 2008	20 May 2008	Final	Runners-up	2	0	0	2	0	3	−3	0.00
Szuperkupa	11 July 2007	15 July 2007	Final	Winners	2	1	1	0	4	1	+3	50.00
UEFA Champions League	31 July 2007	8 August 2007	Second qualifying round	Second qualifying round	2	0	1	1	0	1	−1	0.00
Total					67	41	14	12	154	68	+86	61.19

Source: Competitions

=== Szuperkupa ===
Debrecen, as Nemzeti Bajnokság I winners in the previous season, played against Honvéd in the 2008 Szuperkupa, who themselves won the Magyar Kupa.

11 July 2007 First leg	Honvéd	1–1	Debrecen	Budapest
	Ivancsics 26'; Pomper (yellow card) 55'; Hercegfalvi (yellow card) 65'	Report	Vukmir (yellow card) 31'; Komlósi (yellow card) 60'; Kouemaha 67'; Bernáth (yellow card) 89'	Stadium: Bozsik József Stadion; Referee: Tamás Arany

15 July 2007 Second leg	Debrecen	3–0 (4–1 agg.)	Honvéd	Debrecen
	Dzsudzsák 7', 17'; Z. Kiss 31', (yellow card) 50'	Report	Angoua (yellow card) 25'; Genito (yellow card) 57'; Vincze (yellow card) 64'	Stadium: Oláh Gábor utcai Stadion; Referee: Péter Solymosi
Note: Debrecen won 4–1 on aggregate.

=== Nemzeti Bajnokság I ===
==== League table ====
Pos	Team	Pld	W	D	L	GF	GA	GD	Pts	Qualification or relegation
1	MTK (C)	30	20	6	4	67	23	+44	66	Qualification for Champions League second qualifying round
2	Debrecen	30	19	7	4	67	29	+38	64	Qualification for UEFA Cup first qualifying round
3	Győr	30	16	10	4	64	35	+29	58	Qualification for UEFA Cup first qualifying round
4	Újpest	30	16	7	7	58	40	+18	55	
5	Fehérvár	30	17	3	10	48	32	+16	54	

Source: soccerway.com
(C) Champions

==== Results summary ====
Overall								Home						Away					
Pld	W	D	L	GF	GA	GD	Pts	W	D	L	GF	GA	GD	W	D	L	GF	GA	GD
30	19	7	4	67	29	+38	64	13	1	1	40	10	+30	6	6	3	27	19	+8

Source: Hungarian Football Federation

==== Results by round ====
Round	1	2	3	4	5	6	7	8	9	10	11	12	13	14	15	16	17	18	19	20	21	22	23	24	25	26	27	28	29	30
Ground	A	H	A	H	A	H	A	H	A	H	A	H	A	H	A	H	A	H	A	H	A	H	A	H	A	H	A	H	A	H
Result	W	W	D	W	L	W	L	W	D	W	W	W	D	D	D	W	L	W	W	L	D	W	W	W	W	W	W	W	D	W
Position	6	3	5	2	4	2	4	3	3	2	2	1	3	3	3	2	3	2	2	2	4	4	4	2	2	2	2	2	2	2

Source: Matches
A = Away; H = Home; W = Win; D = Draw; L = Loss

==== Matches ====
22 July 2007 1	Diósgyőr	1–2	Debrecen	Debrecen
	Katona 21'	Report	Kouemaha 8', 16'	Stadium: Oláh Gábor utcai Stadion; Referee: Zoltán Iványi

27 July 2007 2	Debrecen	2–0	Győr	Debrecen
	Dzsudzsák 45'; Demjén 57'	Report		Stadium: Oláh Gábor utcai Stadion; Referee: Zsolt Szabó

3 August 2007 3	Siófok	1–1	Debrecen	Siófok
	Melczer 19'	Report	Rudolf 35'	Stadium: Révész Géza utcai Stadion; Referee: Ferenc Bede

11 August 2007 4	Debrecen	3–2	Zalaegerszeg	Debrecen
	Dzsudzsák 19', 55', (yellow card) 72'; Vukmir (yellow card) 19'; Bernáth (yellow card) 20'; Demjén 53'	Report	Polgár (yellow card) 14'; Koplárovics 30'; Vulin (yellow card) 35'; Pekič 43'; Dudić (yellow card) 72'	Stadium: Oláh Gábor utcai Stadion; Referee: Mihály Fábián

17 August 2007 5	MTK	3–2	Debrecen	Budapest
	J. Kanta 20'; Urbán 67'; Kulcsár 72'	Report	Rudolf 40'; Kouemaha 45'	Stadium: Hidegkuti Nándor Stadion; Referee: Sándor Andó-Szabó

25 August 2007 6	Debrecen	4–0	Kaposvár	Debrecen
	Kerekes 47'; Kouemaha 48'; Sándor 68'; Leandro 73'	Report		Stadium: Oláh Gábor utcai Stadion; Referee: Gergely Sulyok

2 September 2007 7	Honvéd	3–1	Debrecen	Budapest
	Hercegfalvi 62'; B. Tóth 65'; Bárányos 71'	Report	Leandro 47'	Stadium: Bozsik József Stadion; Referee: Tamás Arany

14 September 2007 8	Debrecen	2–0	Vasas	Debrecen
	Komlósi 43'; Kerekes 88'	Report		Stadium: Oláh Gábor utcai Stadion; Referee: József Berger

22 September 2007 9	Nyíregyháza	1–1	Debrecen	Nyíregyháza
	Menougong 9'	Report	Kerekes 65'	Stadium: Városi Stadion; Referee: István Vad

29 September 2007 10	Debrecen	4–1	Tatabánya	Debrecen
	Kerekes 2'; Dzsudzsák 7'; Sándor 33'; Stojkov 52'	Report	M. Takács 61'	Stadium: Oláh Gábor utcai Stadion; Referee: Sándor Andó-Szabó

6 October 2007 11	Rákospalota	0–4	Debrecen	Budapest
	Kapcsos (red card) 48'	Report	Z. Kiss 41'; Dzsudzsák (yellow card) 47', (goal) 90'; Kouemaha 49'; Sándor 52', (yellow card) 62'	Stadium: Stadion Budai II. Laszló; Attendance: 1,000; Referee: Zoltán Iványi

20 October 2007 12	Debrecen	4–2	Sopron	Debrecen
	Kouemaha 11', 18', 28', 61'	Report	Zana 7'; Györök (yellow card) 34'; Belić 84'	Stadium: Oláh Gábor utcai Stadion; Referee: István Mészáros

5 November 2007 13	Fehérvár	0–0	Debrecen	Székesfehérvár
		Report		Stadium: Sóstói Stadion; Referee: István Vad

10 November 2007 14	Debrecen	1–1	Paks	Debrecen
	Kouemaha 54'	Report	Éger 74'	Stadium: Oláh Gábor utcai Stadion; Referee: Mihály Fábián

23 November 2007 15	Újpest	1–1	Debrecen	Budapest
	Korcsmár 90'	Report	Leandro 51'	Stadium: Szusza Ferenc Stadion; Referee: Viktor Kassai

22 February 2008 16	Debrecen	3–0	Diósgyőr	Debrecen
	Kerekes 69', 90+3'; Z. Kiss 75'	Report		Stadium: Oláh Gábor utcai Stadion; Referee: István Vad

1 March 2008 17	Győr	3–1	Debrecen	Győr
	Stark 37'; Völgyi 52'; Böőr 83'	Report	Czvitkovics 88'	Stadium: ETO Park; Referee: István Mészáros

10 March 2008 18	Debrecen	2–0	Siófok	Debrecen
	Kouemaha 27'; Czvitkovics 67'	Report		Stadium: Oláh Gábor utcai Stadion; Referee: József Berger

15 March 2008 19	Zalaegerszeg	1–2	Debrecen	Zalaegerszeg
15:00 CET (UTC+1)	Méyé (yellow card) 11'; Botiș 35'	Report	P. Máté II (yellow card) 17'; Dombi 43'; Czvitkovics 69'	Stadium: ZTE Arena; Referee: Péter Solymosi

22 March 2008 20	Debrecen	0–2	MTK	Debrecen
		Report	Pál 78'; Pollák 88'	Stadium: Oláh Gábor utcai Stadion; Referee: Viktor Kassai

30 March 2008 21	Kaposvár	2–2	Debrecen	Kaposvár
	Szakály 23'; Oláh 63'	Report	Leandro 72'; Bíró 90+3'	Stadium: Rákóczi Stadion; Referee: Sándor Andó-Szabó

5 April 2008 22	Debrecen	1–0	Honvéd	Debrecen
	Kerekes 10'	Report		Stadium: Oláh Gábor utcai Stadion; Referee: Tamás Arany

11 April 2008 23	Vasas	0–3	Debrecen	Budapest
		Report	Kouemaha 9'; Leandro 24'; Czvitkovics 71'	Stadium: Illovszky Rudolf Stadion; Referee: Zoltán Iványi

19 April 2008 24	Debrecen	4–1	Nyíregyháza	Debrecen
	Huszák 25'; Z. Takács 44'; Bagoly 73' (o.g.); Leandro 83'; Bíró (yellow card) 86'	Report	Mboussi (yellow card) 41'; Bagoly 51', (yellow card) 83'	Stadium: Oláh Gábor utcai Stadion; Referee: Ferenc Bede

26 April 2008 25	Tatabánya	1–2	Debrecen	Budapest
	Vámosi 84'	Report	Z. Takács 23'; Kerekes 44'	Stadium: Szőnyi úti Stadion; Referee: Tamás Bognár

3 May 2008 26	Debrecen	4–0	Rákospalota	Debrecen
	Czvitkovics 51'; Kerekes 56', 78'; Leandro 74'	Report	Erős (yellow card) 38'; G. Horváth (yellow card) 61'	Stadium: Oláh Gábor utcai Stadion; Referee: Tamás Arany

10 May 2008 27	Sopron	0–3 (Awarded)	Debrecen	Sopron
		Report		Stadium: Stadion Városi
Note: After the exclusion of Sopron, the matches were registered with a goal difference of 3–0.

17 May 2008 28	Debrecen	3–0	Fehérvár	Debrecen
	Huszák 49'; Czvitkovics 57'; Kouemaha 89'	Report		Stadium: Oláh Gábor utcai Stadion; Referee: Ferenc Bede

23 May 2008 29	Paks	2–2	Debrecen	Paks
	Báló 36'; Belényesi 69'	Report	Leandro 49'; Bogdanović 73'	Stadium: Fehérvári úti Stadion; Referee: Péter Solymosi

31 May 2008 30	Debrecen	3–1	Újpest	Debrecen
	Bogdanović 7', 86'; Kerekes 39'	Report	Regedei 85'	Stadium: Oláh Gábor utcai Stadion; Referee: Tamás Arany

=== Magyar Kupa ===
26 September 2007 Round of 32	Kecskemét	2–4	Debrecen	Kecskemét
	Csordás 30'; Kopunović 89'	Report	Kerekes 23'; Z. Kiss 26'; Sándor 35'; Kouemaha 86'	Stadium: Széktói Stadion; Referee: Zoltán Iványi

==== Round of 16 ====
24 October 2007 First leg	Kaposvölgye	2–5	Debrecen	Nagyberki
	Ukwuoma 44', 67'	Report	Stojkov 5', 39', 69'; Zsolnai 6'; Rudolf 77'	Stadium: Nagyberki Labdarúgó Pálya; Referee: Szabolcs Szilasi

7 November 2007 Second leg	Debrecen	6–2 (11–4 agg.)	Kaposvölgye	Debrecen
	Szilágyi 1', 38'; Czvitkovics 30', 47'; Stojkov 60'; R. Nagy 68'	Report	G. Huzmi 26'; V. Nikolic 88'	Stadium: Oláh Gábor utcai Stadion; Referee: Gyöngyi Gaál
Note: Debrecen won 11–4 on aggregate.

==== Quarter-finals ====
19 March 2008 First leg	Fehérvár	2–1	Debrecen	Székesfehérvár
18:00 CEST (UTC+2)	Farkas 4'; Sitku 66'	Report	Leandro 59'	Stadium: Sóstói Stadion; Referee: Mihály Fábián

27 March 2008 Second leg	Debrecen	3–1 (4–3 agg.)	Fehérvár	Debrecen
18:00 CEST (UTC+2)	Bogdanović 31'; Kerekes 55'; Ďurica 86' (o.g.)	Report	Koller 84'	Stadium: Oláh Gábor utcai Stadion; Referee: Ferenc Bede
Note: Debrecen won 4–3 on aggregate.

==== Semi-finals ====
2 April 2008 First leg	Integrál-DAC	1–4	Debrecen	Győr
	B. Laki 24'	Report	Rudolf 16', 48'; Kouemaha 67'; Demjén 77'	Stadium: Nádorvárosi Stadion; Referee: Krisztián Király

8 April 2008 Second leg	Debrecen	6–0 (10–1 agg.)	Integrál-DAC	Debrecen
	Bogdanović 37', 74', 87', 90+1'; Czvitkovics 71'; Huszák 85'	Report		Stadium: Oláh Gábor utcai Stadion; Referee: Gyöngyi Gaál
Note: Debrecen won 10–1 on aggregate.

==== Final ====
28 May 2008 Second leg	Honvéd	0–7	Debrecen	Budapest
	Filó (yellow card) 11'; Adewunmi (red card) 57'; Pomper (yellow card) 68'; Dobos (red card) 73'	Report	Leandro 9'; Rudolf 18', (yellow card) 29'; Czvitkovics 30', 83'; Kouemaha 57', 78', 89'; Z. Takács (yellow card) 69'	Stadium: Bozsik József Stadion; Referee: Viktor Kassai

4 June 2008 First leg	Debrecen	2–1 (9–1 agg.)	Honvéd	Debrecen
	Bernáth (yellow card) 54'; Czvitkovics (yellow card) 58', (goal) 74'; Leandro 77'; Kerekes (yellow card) 85'	Report	Pomper (yellow card) 30'; Filó 39'; Bárányos (yellow card) 68'	Stadium: Oláh Gábor utcai Stadion; Referee: István Vad
Note: Debrecen won 9–1 on aggregate.

=== Ligakupa ===
==== Autumn season ====
===== Group stage =====
Pos	Team	Pld	W	D	L	GF	GA	GD	Pts	Qualification	DEB	DIO	NYI	VAS
1	Debrecen	6	3	2	1	10	6	+4	11	Advance to knockout phase	—	1–1	3–2	3–0
2	Diósgyőr	6	3	1	2	6	6	0	10	Advance to knockout phase	2–0	—	1–0	2–1
3	Nyíregyháza	6	3	0	3	8	6	+2	9		0–2	1–0	—	4–0
4	Vasas	6	1	1	4	5	11	−6	4		1–1	3–0	0–1	—

Source: HFF

15 August 2007 1	Diósgyőr	2–0	Debrecen	Miskolc
19:00 CEST (UTC+2)	Simon 60'; Lipusz 86'	Report		Stadium: Diósgyőri Stadion; Referee: Péter Solymosi

22 August 2007 2	Debrecen	3–2	Nyíregyháza	Debrecen
16:00 CEST (UTC+2)	Zsolnai 28'; Kerekes 41'; Dombi 68'	Report	Moldovan 58'; Cséke 83'	Stadium: Oláh Gábor utcai Stadion; Referee: Zoltán Iványi

9 September 2007 3	Debrecen	3–0	Vasas	Debrecen
18:00 CEST (UTC+2)	Kerekes 54'; Sidibe 60'; Z. Takács 80'	Report		Stadium: Oláh Gábor utcai Stadion; Referee: Mihály Fábián

19 September 2007 4	Vasas	1–1	Debrecen	Budapest
19:00 CEST (UTC+2)	Mundi 22'	Report	Kouemaha 76'	Stadium: Illovszky Rudolf Stadion; Referee: Péter Solymosi

3 October 2007 5	Debrecen	1–1	Diósgyőr	Debrecen
18:00 CEST (UTC+2)	Kouemaha 61'	Report	N'Gam 43'	Stadium: Oláh Gábor utcai Stadion; Referee: Gergely Sulyok

10 October 2007 6	Nyíregyháza	0–2	Debrecen	Nyíregyháza
15:00 CEST (UTC+2)		Report	Sidibe 6'; Kouemaha 64'	Stadium: Városi Stadion; Attendance: 2,500; Referee: Zsolt Szabó

===== Knockout phase =====
====== Quarter-finals ======
17 October 2007 First leg	Debrecen	3–0	Újpest	Debrecen
20:30 CEST (UTC+2)	Czvitkovics 29'; Kerekes 78'; [ ] *Kouemaha 90+2'xa	Report		Stadium: Oláh Gábor utcai Stadion; Referee: Mihály Fábián

28 October 2007 Second leg	Újpest	0–0 (0–3 agg.)	Debrecen	Budapest
17:30 CEST (UTC+2)		Report		Stadium: Szusza Ferenc Stadion; Referee: Abdul Rahman Hussein
Note: Debrecen won 3–0 on aggregate.

====== Semi-finals ======
31 October 2007 First leg	Debrecen	1–4	Diósgyőr	Debrecen
18:00 CEST (UTC+2)	Sidibe 49'	Report	Katona 18'; Simon 28', 58'; Lipusz 68'	Stadium: Oláh Gábor utcai Stadion; Referee: Sándor Andó-Szabó

14 November 2007 Second leg	Diósgyőr	2–3 (6–4 agg.)	Debrecen	Miskolc
18:00 CEST (UTC+2)	Vukmir 48' (o.g.); Simon 60'	Report	P. Szilágyi 28', 32'; Kouemaha 90+1'	Stadium: Diósgyőri Stadion; Referee: Zsolt Szabó
Note: Diósgyőr won 6–4 on aggregate.

==== Spring season ====
===== Group stage =====
Pos	Team	Pld	W	D	L	GF	GA	GD	Pts	Qualification	DEB	RAK	HON	NYI
1	Debrecen	6	4	1	1	10	8	+2	13	Advance to knockout phase	—	3–2	2–1	2–1
2	Rákospalota	6	3	1	2	9	10	−1	9 (Note: Rákospalota were deducted 1 point.)	Advance to knockout phase	3–1	—	1–1	2–0
3	Honvéd	6	2	2	2	13	8	+5	8		1–2	5–0	—	4–2
4	Nyíregyháza	6	0	2	4	4	10	−6	2		0–0	0–1	1–1	—

Source: HFF
Notes:

30 November 2007 1	Rákospalota	3–1	Debrecen	Budapest
13:00 CEST (UTC+2)	Torma 33', 42'; Kapcsos 49'	Report	Czvitkovics 50'	Stadium: Stadion Budai II. Laszló; Attendance: 100; Referee: József Berger

5 December 2007 2	Debrecen	2–1	Nyíregyháza	Debrecen
13:00 CET (UTC+1)	Z. Takács 8'; Czvitkovics 34'	Report	Apostu 47'	Stadium: Oláh Gábor utcai Stadion; Referee: Zsolt Szabó

8 December 2007 3	Debrecen	2–1	Honvéd	Debrecen
13:00 CEST (UTC+2)	Z. Takács 41' (pen.), 80'	Report	Veledar 37'	Stadium: Oláh Gábor utcai Stadion; Referee: Péter Solymosi

16 February 2008 4	Honvéd	1–2	Debrecen	Budapest
13:00 CEST (UTC+2)	Ivancsics 4'	Report	Dombi 20'; Kouemaha 45'	Stadium: Bozsik József Stadion; Referee: Zsolt Szabó

20 February 2008 5	Debrecen	3–2	Rákospalota	Debrecen
14:00 CEST (UTC+2)	R. Nagy 22'; Rudolf 47', 71'; Fodor (yellow card) 55'; Szűcs (yellow card) 73'; Poleksić (yellow card) 90'	Report	Nyerges 32', 73'; Z. Varga (yellow card) 78'; G. Horváth (yellow card) 82'	Stadium: Stadion Oláh Gábor Út; Attendance: 1,000; Referee: Attila Hegedűs

27 February 2008 6	Nyíregyháza	0–0	Debrecen	Nyíregyháza
14:00 CET (UTC+1)		Report		Stadium: Városi Stadion; Referee: Róbert Nagy

===== Knockout phase =====
====== Quarter-finals ======
5 March 2008 First leg	Újpest	1–5	Debrecen	Budapest
	Hajdú 50'	Report	Stojkov 6'; Kouemaha 59', 85'; Huszák 65'; Leandro 77'	Stadium: Szusza Ferenc Stadion; Referee: István Vad

12 March 2008 Second leg	Debrecen	5–0 (10–1 agg.)	Újpest	Debrecen
	Bogdanović 8', 44', 54', 77'; Rezes 13'	Report		Stadium: Oláh Gábor utcai Stadion; Referee: Zoltán Iványi
Note: Debrecen won 10–1 on aggregate.

====== Semi-finals ======
16 April 2008 First leg	Debrecen	2–0	Siófok	Debrecen
	Chigou 8', 28'	Report		Stadium: Oláh Gábor utcai Stadion; Referee: István Vad

23 April 2008 Second leg	Siófok	0–0 (0–2 agg.)	Debrecen	Siófok
		Report		Stadium: Révész Géza utcai Stadion; Referee: Hawla Hussein
Note: Debrecen won 2–0 on aggregate.

====== Final ======
30 April 2008 First leg	Győr	2–0	Debrecen	Győr
	Tokody 40'; Dudás 43'	Report		Stadium: ETO Park; Referee: István Vad

7 May 2008 Second leg	Debrecen	6–0 (6–2 agg.)	Győr	Debrecen
	Kouemaha 9', 44'; Huszák 33'; Bogdanović 78', 84'; Pákolicz 79' (o.g.)	Report		Stadium: Oláh Gábor utcai Stadion; Referee: Viktor Kassai
Note: Debrecen won 6–2 on aggregate and advanced to the Grand final.

==== Grand final ====
14 May 2008 First leg	Fehérvár	1–0	Debrecen	Székesfehérvár
	Dajić 22'; D. Nagy (yellow card) 87'	Report	Fodor (yellow card) 45'	Stadium: Sóstói Stadion; Attendance: 800; Referee: Tamás Bognár

20 May 2008 Second leg	Debrecen	0–2 (0–3 agg.)	Fehérvár	Debrecen
	Rudolf (yellow card) 32'; Szűcs (yellow card) 66'	Report	Dajić (yellow card) 36'; Sifter 58'; Sitku 71'; Csobánki (yellow card) 90'	Stadium: Oláh Gábor utcai Stadion; Attendance: 1,000; Referee: Zoltán Iványi
Note: Fehérvár won 3–0 on aggregate.

=== UEFA Champions League ===
==== Second qualifying round ====
31 July 2007 First leg	Debrecen (Hungary)	0–1	(Sweden) Elfsborg	Debrecen, Hungary
20:45 CEST (UTC+2)	Dzsudzsák (yellow card) 31'	Report	Holmén (yellow card) 26'; Andersson (yellow card) 55'; Mobaeck 65'	Stadium: Oláh Gábor utcai Stadion; Attendance: 10,000; Referee: Sten Kaldma (Estonia)

8 August 2007 Second leg	Elfsborg (Sweden)	0–0 (1–0 agg.)	(Hungary) Debrecen	Borås, Sweden
19:00 CEST (UTC+2)	Svensson (yellow card) 29'; Ishizaki (yellow card) 45+1'; Wiland (yellow card) 74'; Florén (yellow card) 90+3'	Report	Komlósi (yellow card) 22'; Kouemaha (yellow card) 67' (yellow-red card) 88'; Kerekes (yellow card) 85'; Sándor (yellow card) 90+2'	Stadium: Borås Arena; Attendance: 11,952; Referee: Claudio Circhetta (Switzerland)
Note: Elfsborg won 1–0 on aggregate.
