= List of Debreceni VSC records and statistics =

Debreceni VSC is a professional football club, based in Debrecen, Hungary.

== Honours ==
=== Domestic ===
- Nemzeti Bajnokság I
  - Winners (7): 2004–05, 2005–06, 2006–07, 2008–09, 2009–10, 2011–12, 2013–14
  - Runners-up (1): 2007–08
- Nemzeti Bajnokság II
  - Winners (8): 1942–43 1948–49, 1959–60, 1961–62, 1978–79, 1988–89, 1992–93, 2020–21
  - Runners-up (3): 1941–42, 1957–58, 1983–84
- Magyar Kupa
  - Winners (6): 1998–99, 2000–01, 2007–08, 2009–10, 2011–12, 2012–13
  - Runners-up (2): 2002–03, 2006–07
- Ligakupa
  - Winners (1): 2009–10
  - Runners-up (3): 2007–08, 2010–11, 2014–15
- Szuperkupa
  - Winners (5): 2005, 2006, 2007, 2009, 2010
  - Runners-up (4): 2008, 2012, 2013, 2014

== Manager ==
- First managers: Imre Béki
- Longest-serving manager by time: Elemér Kondás (from 20 April 2011 to 25 July 2016)
- Longest-serving manager by matches:
- Most matches managed:
- Most matches won as manager:
- Most matches lost as a manager:
- Most goals scored under a manager:
- Most goals conceded under a manager:
- Most successful manager:

== Player ==
As of 19 December 2025.

=== Most appearances ===
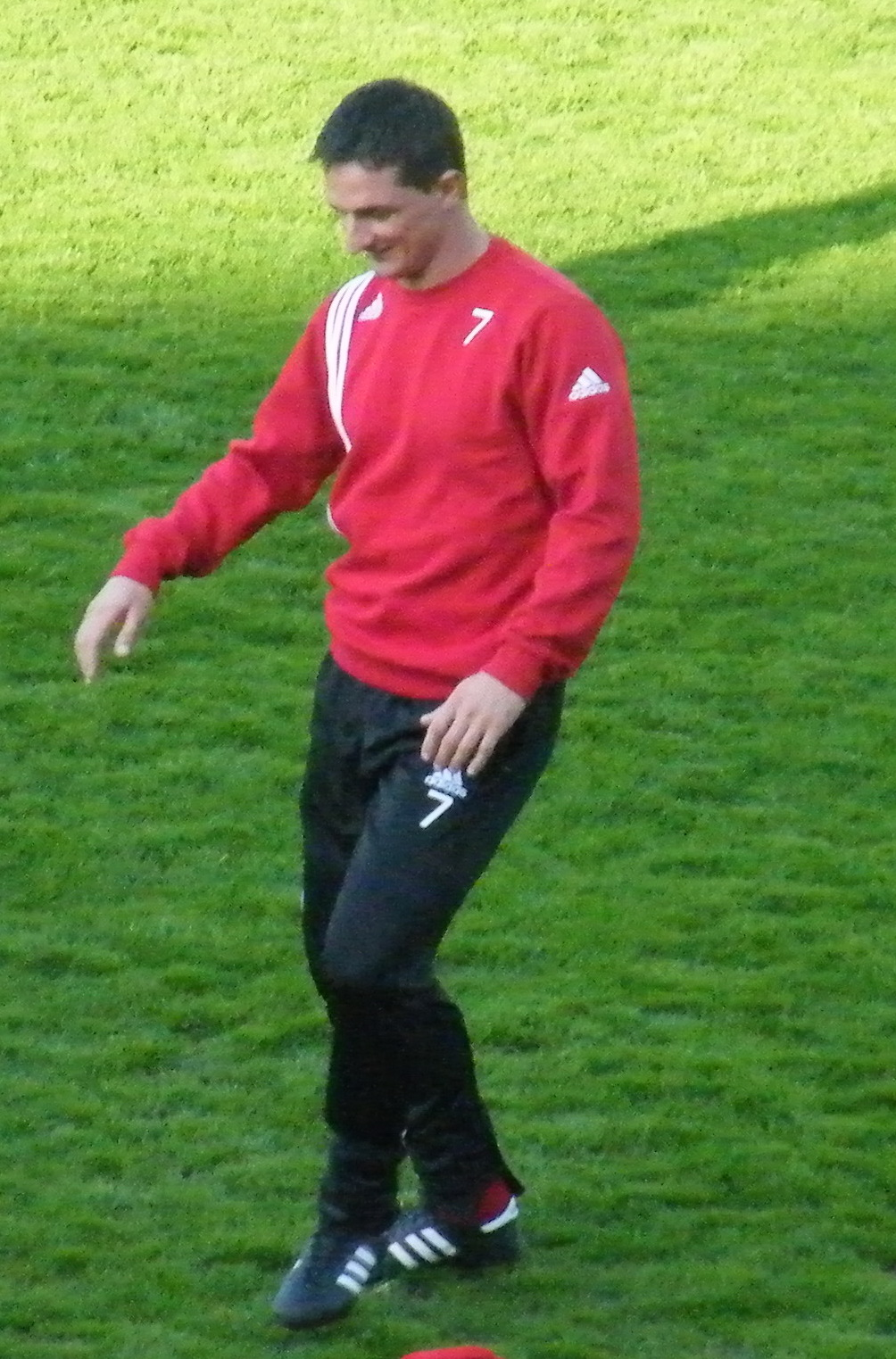
Tibor Dombi has the most appearances

No.	Name	Total	Period
1.	(Hungary) Tibor Dombi	437	1993–1999 and 2002–2014
2.	(Hungary) Sándor Csaba	317	
3.	(Hungary) Csaba Bernáth	301	1996–2003 and 2004–2013
4.	(Hungary) Balázs Dzsudzsák	200	2004–2008 and 2020–present

=== Top scorers ===
Season	Player	Goals
1987–88	(Hungary) Béla Melis	19
2006–07	(Senegal) Ibrahim Sidibe	18
2011–12	(France) Adamo Coulibaly	20
2012–13	(France) Adamo Coulibaly	18

=== Zilahi prize ===
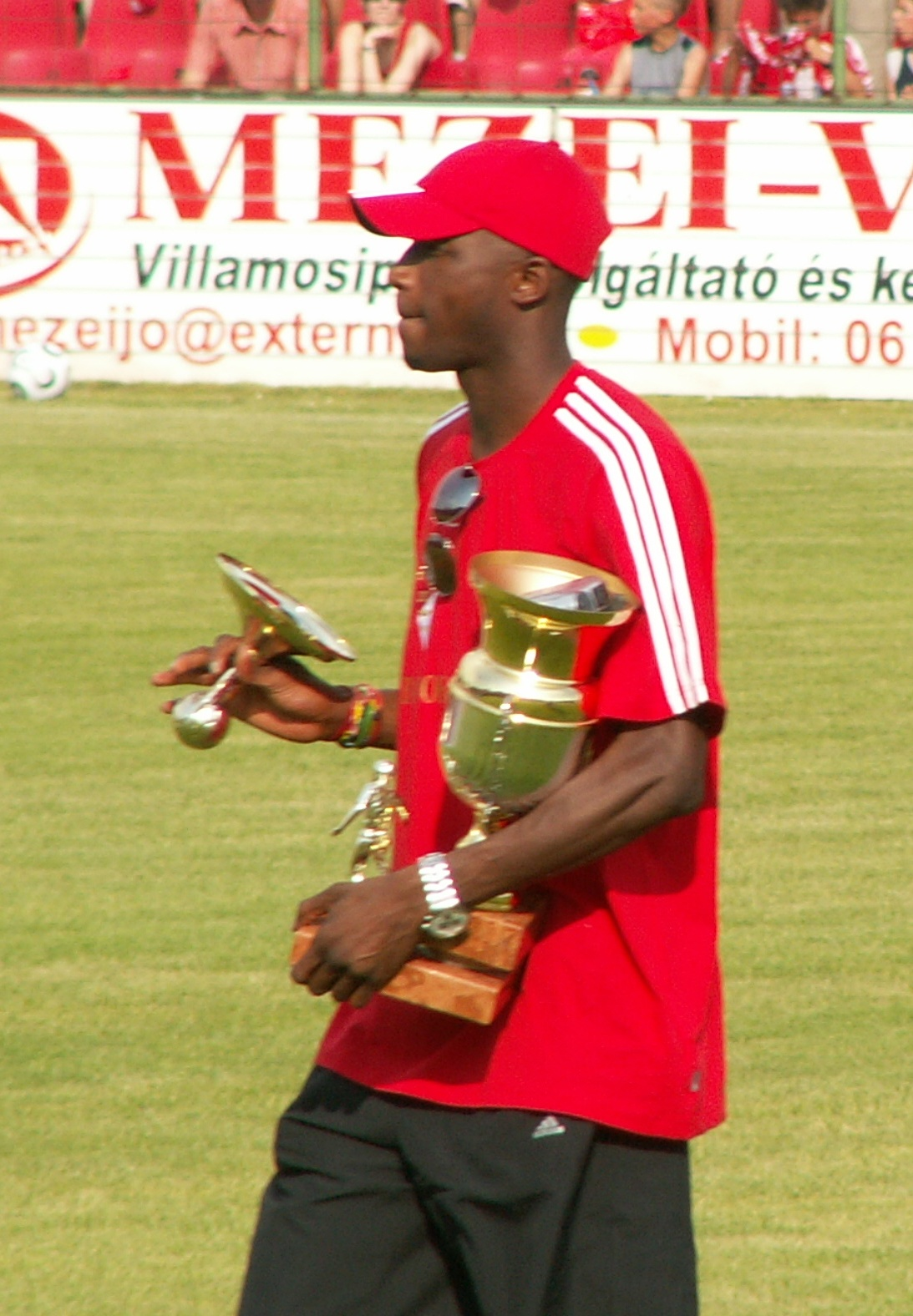
Ibrahima Sidibe was awarded the Zilahi prize in 2007

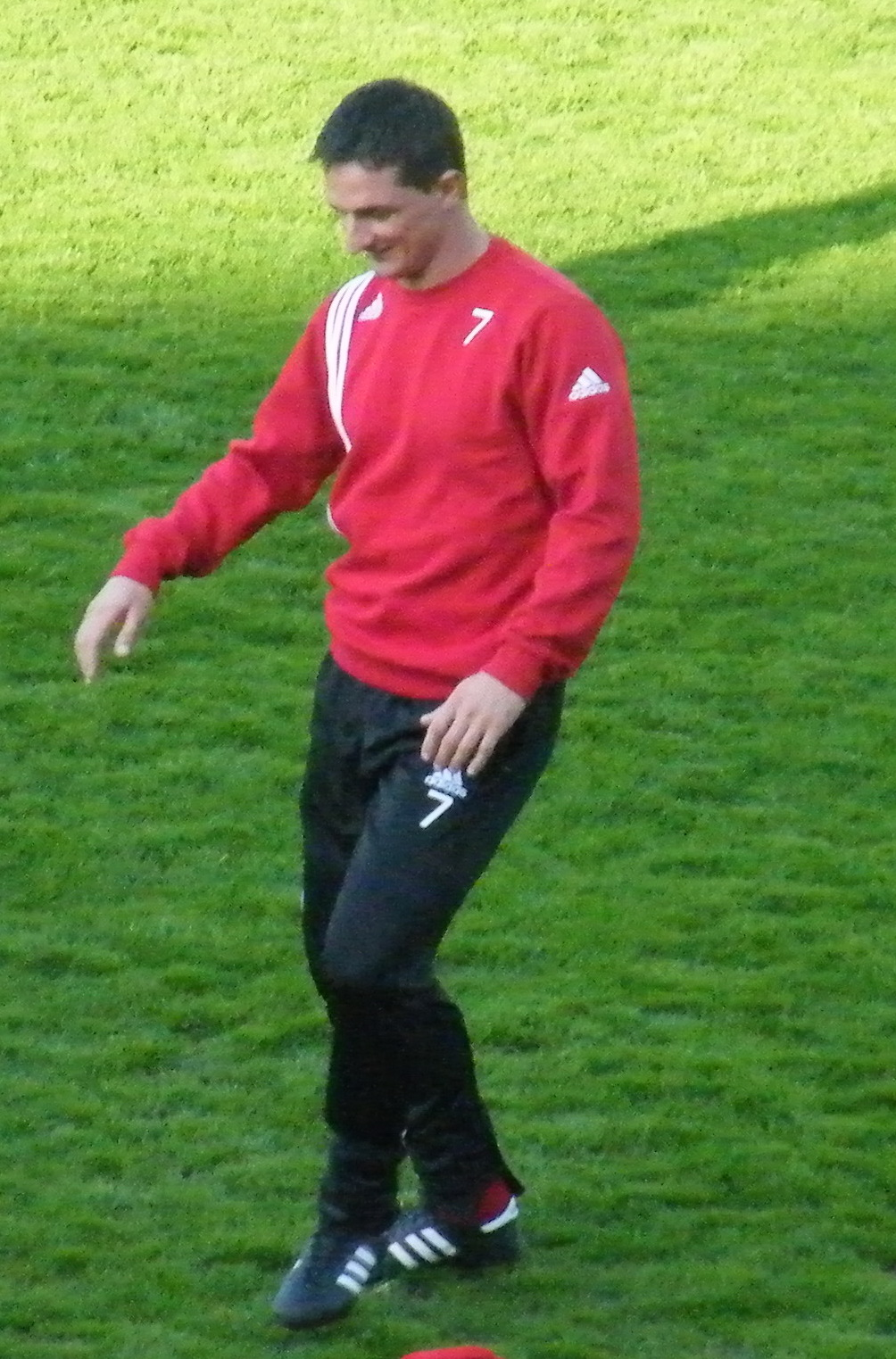
Tibor Dombi was awarded the Zilahi prize in 2003

- 2000: (Hungary) Zsolt Vadicska
- 2001: (Hungary) Csaba Sándor
- 2002: (Hungary) Zoltán Böőr
- 2003: (Hungary) Tibor Dombi
- 2004: (Hungary) Tamás Sándor
- 2005: (Hungary) Péter Halmosi
- 2006: (Hungary) Tamás Sándor
- 2007: (Senegal) Ibrahima Sidibe
- 2008: (Hungary) Zsombor Kerekes
- 2009: (Hungary) Gergely Rudolf
- 2010: (Hungary) Péter Czvitkovics
- 2011: (Hungary) András Herczeg
- 2012: (Hungary) József Varga
- 2013: (France) Adamo Coulibaly
- 2014: (Serbia) Nenad Novaković
- 2015: (Hungary) József Varga
- 2016: (Hungary) Norbert Mészáros
- 2017: (Serbia) Dusan Brkovic
- 2018: (Hungary) Sándor Nagy
- 2019: Ádám Bódi
- 2020: (Hungary) Dániel Tőzsér
- 2021: —
- 2022: (Hungary) Péter Baráth
- 2023: (Hungary) Balázs Dzsudzsák
- 2024: (Hungary) Balázs Megyeri
- 2025: (Hungary) Donát Bárány

=== Record departures ===
	Player	To	Fee	Year
1.	(Hungary) Balázs Dzsudzsák	(Netherlands) PSV Eindhoven	€2.5 million	2008
2.	(Hungary) Norbert Balogh	(Italy) U.S. Città di Palermo	€2.2 million	2016
3.	(Hungary) Zsolt Laczkó	(Italy) U.C. Sampdoria	€830 000	2011

=== Record arrivals ===
	Player	From	Fee	Year
1.	(Hungary) Balázs Farkas	(Ukraine) Dynamo Kyiv	€400,000	2011
2.	(Hungary) Zoltán Takács	(Hungary) Budapest Honvéd FC	€300,000	2007
3.	(Cameroon) Dorge Kouemaha	(Hungary) FC Tatabánya	€260,000	2008
