= Gábor Demjén =

Hungarian footballer

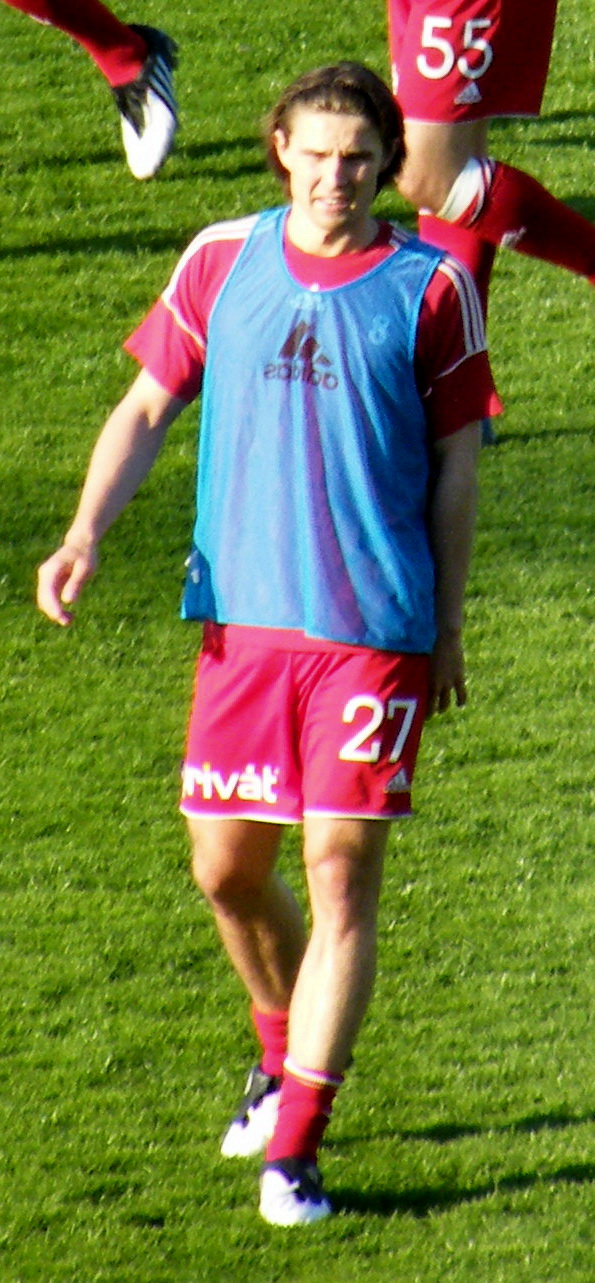

Personal information
- Full name: Gábor Demjén
- Date of birth: 1 March 1986 (age 40)
- Place of birth: Szob, Hungary
- Height: 1.77 m (5 ft 10 in)
- Position: Midfielder

Team information
- Current team: Dhaka Abahani

Youth career
- 1994–1996: Vác
- 1996–2000: Vasas
- 2000–2003: Újpest
- 2003–2005: Liberty Salonta

Senior career*
| Years | Team | Apps | (Gls) |
| 2005–2007 | Sopron | 52 | (5) |
| 2007–2009 | Debrecen | 29 | (3) |
| 2009–2010 | Videoton | 1 | (0) |
| 2010 | → Újpest (loan) | 2 | (0) |
| 2010–2011 | Nyíregyháza | 30 | (3) |
| 2011–2013 | Pécs | 23 | (0) |
| 2013–2015 | Balmazújváros | 23 | (2) |
| 2015– | Dhaka Abahani | 0 | (0) |

International career
| 2002–2003 | Hungary U-17 | 5 | (0) |
| 2004–2005 | Hungary U-19 | 2 | (0) |
| 2007–2008 | Hungary U-21 | 5 | (0) |
- * Club domestic league appearances and goals as of 1 June 2014

Gábor Demjén (born 1 March 1986 in Szob) is a Hungarian footballer who currently plays for Abahani Limited.

== Career ==
Demjén started his career as a trainee in the youth team of Újpest FC. Later on, he decided to leave the club for the Romanian second division club CF Liberty Salonta in order to gain experience. In 2005, he decided to move with the chairman of the Romanian club Marius Vizer to the Hungarian first division outfit FC Sopron. After two years of success with the club, he moved on to the Nemzeti Bajnokság I treble champion Debreceni VSC in the 2007–08 season where he managed to win the Hungarian Cup.

== International career ==
In the 2002–03 season, he was a member of the Hungarian national under-17 football team that reached the group stage of the 2003 UEFA European Under-17 Football Championship in Portugal.

== Honours ==
Debreceni VSC

- Nemzeti Bajnokság I: 2008–09; runner-up 2007–08
- Magyar Kupa: 2007–08
