= Tibor Dombi =

Hungarian footballer (born 1973)

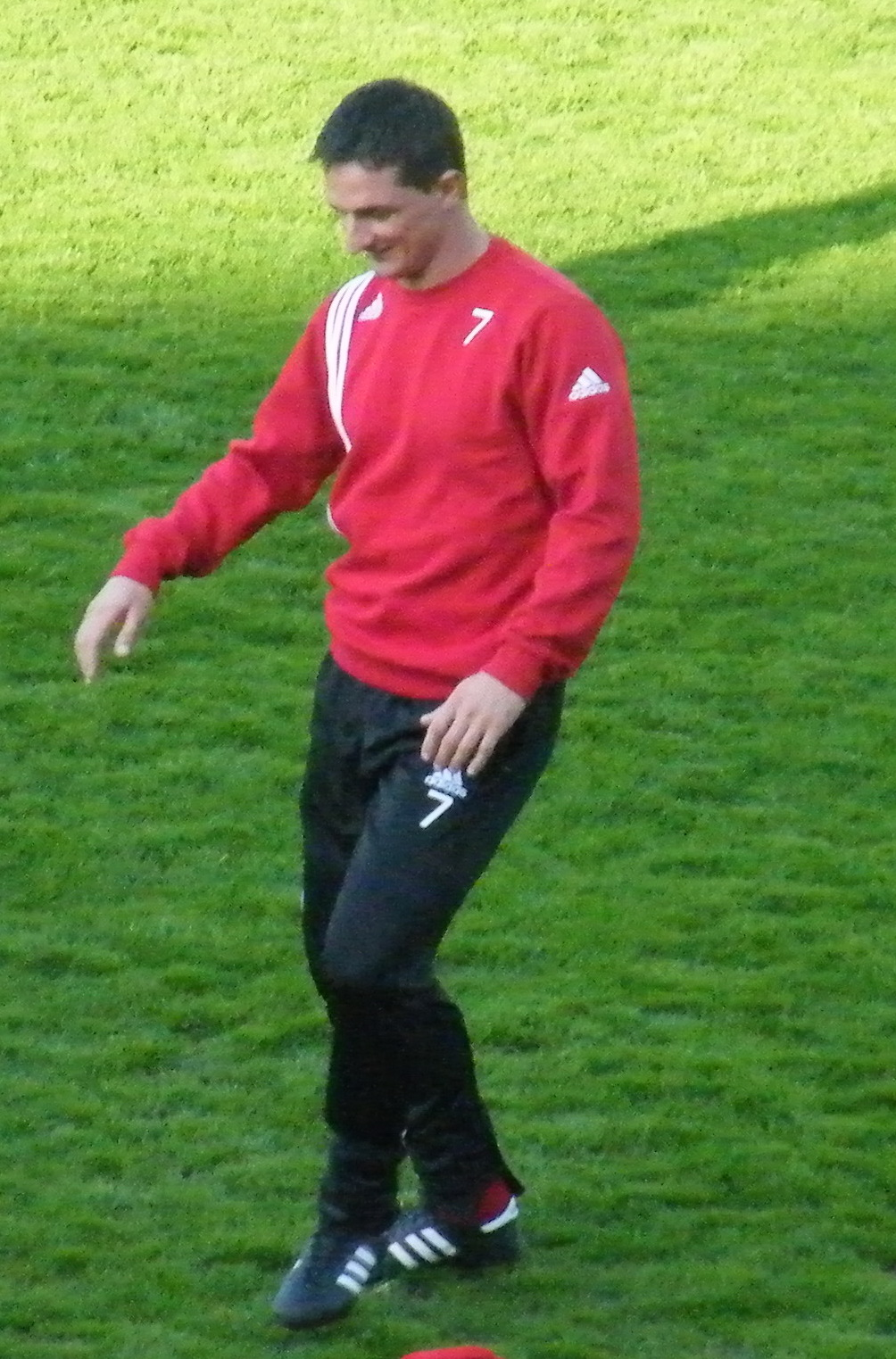
- Dombi in 2009

Personal information
- Date of birth: 11 November 1973 (age 52)
- Place of birth: Püspökladány, Hungary
- Height: 1.74 m (5 ft 9 in)
- Position: Right midfielder

Youth career
- 1987–1993: Debrecen

Senior career*
| Years | Team | Apps | (Gls) |
| 1993–1999 | Debrecen | 190 | (17) |
| 1999–2000 | Eintracht Frankfurt | 15 | (0) |
| 2000–2002 | Utrecht | 26 | (2) |
| 2002–2014 | Debrecen | 247 | (13) |
| 2014–2016 | Debrecen II | 39 | (1) |
| Total | | 507 | (33) |

International career
| 1994–2001 | Hungary | 35 | (1) |
- * Club domestic league appearances and goals

Tibor Dombi (Hungarian pronunciation: [ˈtibor ˈdombi]; born 11 November 1973) is a Hungarian former professional footballer who played as a right midfielder. He spent most of his career with Debreceni VSC, where he amassed over 400 league appearances in two stints separated by spells at Eintracht Frankfurt in Bundesliga and at FC Utrecht in the Eredivisie.

== Career ==
Born in Püspökladány, Dombi came through the youth setup of Debreceni VSC, and joined the senior team in 1992. He made his debut for the Hungary national team in 1994, and got 35 caps and one goal until 2001, when he retired from international football. He was a participant at the 1996 Summer Olympics in Atlanta, where Hungary failed to progress from the group stage. He stayed in Debrecen until 1999, celebrating Debreceni VSC's first domestic cup success just before he left for Eintracht Frankfurt. Dombi started his career in Germany well playing in most of the matches in the first half of the season. However, due to language problems and a conflict with the club's manager, Felix Magath, he left at the end of the season.

He joined FC Utrecht, the team he played for two seasons before he made his return to Hungary. After he returned to Debrecen, the club's Golden Era started, during which the team won the Hungarian League three times in a row. (Before 2005, Debrecen did not manage to win the league.) In 2009, he was the member of the team that won Debrecen's fourth domestic title.

== International career ==
Dombi made his debut in the Hungary national team on 1 June 1994, in Eindhoven against the Netherlands. During his career he gained 35 caps (1994–2001) and scored one goal (1998, Hungary against Slovenia 2–1).

During the 1995–96 season, Dombi was a member of the Hungary Olympic football team, which won qualification to the 1996 Summer Olympics in Atlanta. Hungary lost all of their three group matches in the Olympics, their opponents included future gold medal winners Nigeria, and Brazil.

== Career statistics ==
=== Club ===
Appearances and goals by club, season and competition
| Club | Season | League | | | National cup | | League cup | | Europe | | Total | |
| Club | Season | Division | Apps | Goals | Apps | Goals | Apps | Goals | Apps | Goals | Apps | Goals |
|---|---|---|---|---|---|---|---|---|---|---|---|---|
| Debrecen | 1993–94 | Nemzeti Bajnokság I | 30 | 3 | 0 | 0 | 0 | 0 | 0 | 0 | 30 | 3 |
| Debrecen | 1994–95 | Nemzeti Bajnokság I | 29 | 2 | 0 | 0 | 0 | 0 | 0 | 0 | 29 | 2 |
| Debrecen | 1995–96 | Nemzeti Bajnokság I | 28 | 2 | 0 | 0 | 0 | 0 | 0 | 0 | 28 | 2 |
| Debrecen | 1996–97 | Nemzeti Bajnokság I | 32 | 2 | 5 | 0 | 0 | 0 | 0 | 0 | 37 | 2 |
| Debrecen | 1997–98 | Nemzeti Bajnokság I | 34 | 3 | 0 | 0 | 0 | 0 | 0 | 0 | 34 | 3 |
| Debrecen | 1998–99 | Nemzeti Bajnokság I | 27 | 5 | 3 | 2 | 0 | 0 | 8 | 0 | 38 | 7 |
| Debrecen | Total | | 180 | 17 | 8 | 2 | 0 | 0 | 8 | 0 | 196 | 19 |
| Eintracht Frankfurt | 1999–00 | Bundesliga | 15 | 0 | 2 | 0 | 0 | 0 | 0 | 0 | 17 | 0 |
| Utrecht | 2000–01 | Eredivisie | 23 | 2 | 0 | 0 | 0 | 0 | 0 | 0 | 23 | 2 |
| Utrecht | 2001–02 | Eredivisie | 3 | 0 | 0 | 0 | 0 | 0 | 1 | 0 | 4 | 0 |
| Utrecht | Total | | 26 | 2 | 0 | 0 | 0 | 0 | 1 | 0 | 27 | 2 |
| Debrecen | 2002–03 | Nemzeti Bajnokság I | 25 | 1 | 5 | 1 | 0 | 0 | 0 | 0 | 30 | 2 |
| Debrecen | 2003–04 | Nemzeti Bajnokság I | 30 | 3 | 1 | 0 | 0 | 0 | 8 | 1 | 38 | 3 |
| Debrecen | 2004–05 | Nemzeti Bajnokság I | 27 | 3 | 1 | 0 | 0 | 0 | 0 | 0 | 28 | 3 |
| Debrecen | 2005–06 | Nemzeti Bajnokság I | 26 | 0 | 0 | 0 | 0 | 0 | 3 | 0 | 29 | 0 |
| Debrecen | 2006–07 | Nemzeti Bajnokság I | 24 | 1 | 7 | 0 | 0 | 0 | 1 | 0 | 32 | 1 |
| Debrecen | 2007–08 | Nemzeti Bajnokság I | 22 | 1 | 4 | 0 | 13 | 0 | 1 | 0 | 40 | 1 |
| Debrecen | 2008–09 | Nemzeti Bajnokság I | 26 | 2 | 5 | 0 | 2 | 0 | 3 | 0 | 36 | 2 |
| Debrecen | 2009–10 | Nemzeti Bajnokság I | 20 | 0 | 2 | 0 | 1 | 0 | 9 | 0 | 32 | 0 |
| Debrecen | 2010–11 | Nemzeti Bajnokság I | 20 | 1 | 0 | 0 | 2 | 0 | 7 | 0 | 29 | 1 |
| Debrecen | 2011–12 | Nemzeti Bajnokság I | 6 | 0 | 2 | 0 | 8 | 0 | 0 | 0 | 16 | 0 |
| Debrecen | 2012–13 | Nemzeti Bajnokság I | 11 | 0 | 3 | 1 | 5 | 0 | 0 | 0 | 19 | 1 |
| Debrecen | 2013–14 | Nemzeti Bajnokság I | 10 | 1 | 3 | 0 | 10 | 1 | 0 | 0 | 23 | 2 |
| Debrecen | Total | | 247 | 13 | 34 | 2 | 47 | 1 | 32 | 1 | 360 | 17 |
| Debrecen II | 2014–15 | Nemzeti Bajnokság III | 21 | 1 | 0 | 0 | 0 | 0 | 0 | 0 | 21 | 1 |
| Debrecen II | 2015–16 | Nemzeti Bajnokság III | 18 | 0 | 0 | 0 | 0 | 0 | 0 | 0 | 18 | 0 |
| Debrecen II | Total | | 39 | 1 | 0 | 0 | 0 | 0 | 0 | 0 | 39 | 1 |
| Career total | | | 507 | 33 | 44 | 4 | 47 | 1 | 41 | 1 | 639 | 39 |

=== International ===
Appearances and goals by national team and year
| Team | Year | Friendlies | | International Competition | | Total | |
| Team | Year | App | Goals | App | Goals | App | Goals |
|---|---|---|---|---|---|---|---|
| Hungary | 1994 | 2 | 0 | 0 | 0 | 2 | 0 |
| Hungary | 1996 | 3 | 0 | 1 | 0 | 4 | 0 |
| Hungary | 1997 | 4 | 0 | 6 | 0 | 10 | 0 |
| Hungary | 1998 | 1 | 1 | 2 | 0 | 3 | 1 |
| Hungary | 1999 | 3 | 0 | 4 | 0 | 7 | 0 |
| Hungary | 2000 | 1 | 0 | 2 | 0 | 3 | 0 |
| Hungary | 2001 | 3 | 0 | 3 | 0 | 6 | 0 |
| Total | | 17 | 1 | 18 | 0 | 35 | 1 |

Scores and results list Hungary's goal tally first, score column indicates score after each Dombi goal.

List of international goals scored by Tibor Dombi
| No. | Date | Venue | Opponent | Score | Result | Competition |
|---|---|---|---|---|---|---|
| 1 | 19 August 1998 | ZTE Stadion, Zalaegerszeg, Hungary | Slovenia | 1–0 | 2–1 | Friendly |

== Honours ==
Debrecen

- Hungarian League: 2004–05, 2005–06, 2006–07, 2008–09, 2009–10; runners-up 2007–08
- Hungarian Cup: 1998–99, 2007–08, 2009–10; runners-up 2002–03, 2006–07
- Hungarian Super Cup: 2005, 2006, 2007, 2009, 2010
- Hungarian League Cup: 2010; runners-up 2008

Utrecht

- KNVB Cup runners-up: 2002

Individual

- Zilahi Prize: 2003
