= Leandro (footballer, born 1982) =

Hungarian footballer

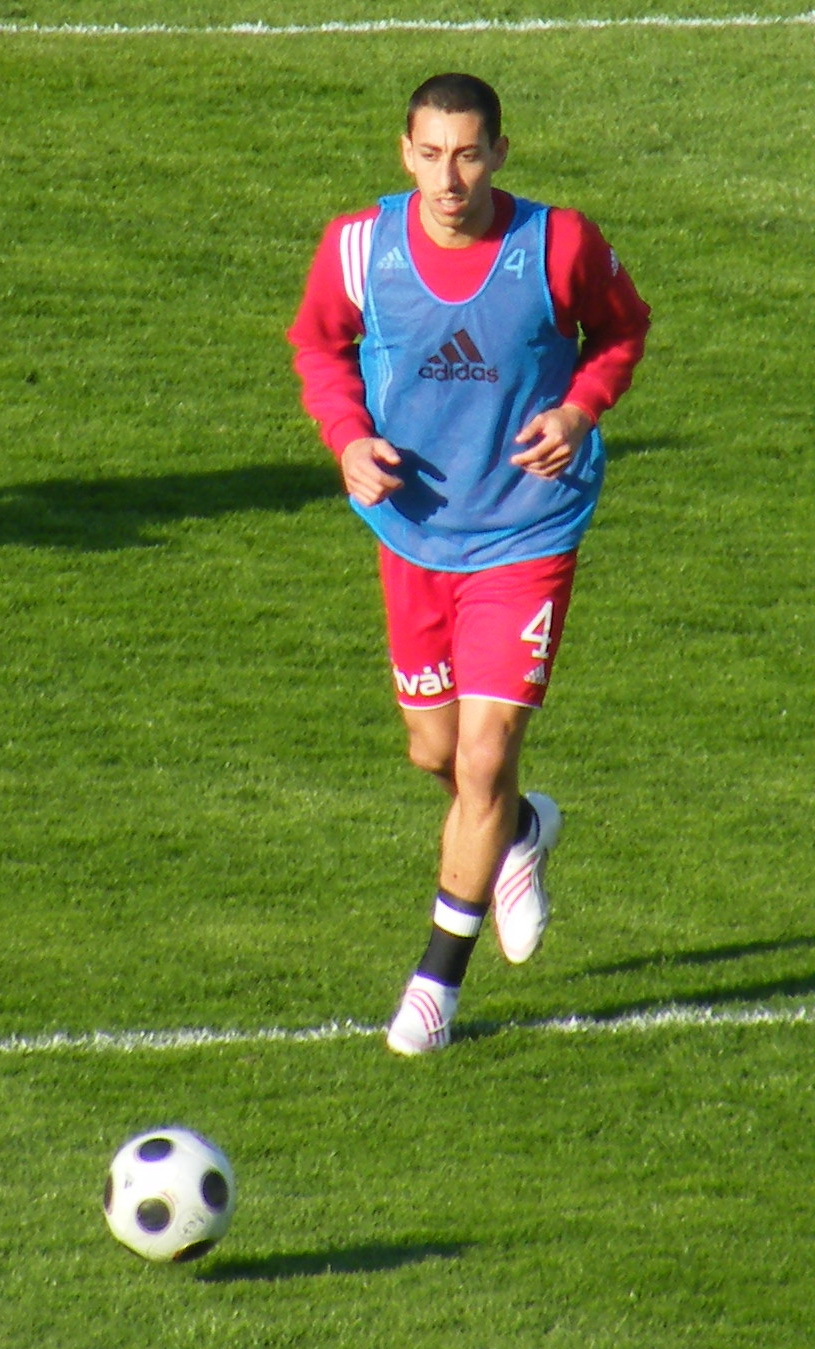

Personal information
- Full name: Leandro Marcolini Pedroso de Almeida
- Date of birth: 19 March 1982 (age 44)
- Place of birth: Cornélio Procópio, Paraná, Brazil
- Height: 1.75 m (5 ft 9 in)
- Positions: Midfielder; left-back

Team information
- Current team: Ferencváros (assistant)

Youth career
- –1998: Corinthians
- 1998–1999: Londrina

Senior career*
Years	Team	Apps	(Gls)
1999–2000	MTK Budapest	2	(0)
2000	Büki TK Bükfürdő	10	(0)
2001–2002	Szombathely	52	(11)
2002–2006	Ferencváros	85	(7)
2005	→ Atlético Paranaense (loan)	4	(0)
2006–2009	Debrecen	95	(23)
2010–2015	Omonia	132	(17)
2015–2020	Ferencváros	118	(8)
2020–2023	Ferencváros II	69	(12)

International career
2003	Hungary U21	4	(0)
2004–2015	Hungary	16	(0)

Managerial career
- 2023–: Ferencváros (assistant)
- * Club domestic league appearances and goals

Leandro Marcolini Pedroso de Almeida (born 19 March 1982), generally known as Leandro, is a former professional footballer who played mainly as a midfielder. Born in Brazil, he played for the Hungary national team.

== Club career ==
He has also played for Brazilian clubs Londrina, Corinthians, Atlético Paranaense, and Hungarian clubs Debrecen, Ferencváros, MTK, Haladás and Bük.

=== Omonia ===
In January 2010, he signed a contract with Cypriot side Omonia. He broke into the first team very quickly and he soon became a key player for the successful 2009–10 league campaign. He scored in a 2010 Cypriot Super Cup final against Apollon Limassol to send the match to penalties, which were eventually won by Omonia. At the end of the season, Omonia won the Cypriot Cup, with Leandro contributing heavily by scoring it the extra-time of semi-final against Ethnikos Achna. For the 2011–12 season, he was named third captain of Omonia, behind Constantinos Makrides and Christos Karipidis. During that season, the Brazilian faced many injury problems and performed poorly. Eventually, he stayed with the club and participated in the preparation with no problems, and not only he won a position in the starting lineup but became captain of the team.

=== Ferencváros ===
On 16 June 2020, he became champions with Ferencváros again after beating Honvéd at the Hidegkuti Nándor Stadion on the 30th match day of the 2019–20 Nemzeti Bajnokság I season.

== International career ==
After residing in Hungary for 5 years since the age of 17, he became a naturalized citizen of Hungary. He has since played for Hungary. Leandro's début came on 1 June 2004, in a match against China.

== Career statistics ==
=== Club ===
As of 14 November 2020.

Appearances and goals by club, season and competition
Club	Season	League			Cup		Continental		Other		Total	
Club	Season	Division	Apps	Goals	Apps	Goals	Apps	Goals	Apps	Goals	Apps	Goals
MTK Budapest	1999–00	Nemzeti Bajnokság I	2	0	?	?	0	0	0	0	2	0
Bük	2000–01	Nemzeti Bajnokság II	10	0	?	?	—		0	0	10	0
Haladás	2000–01	Nemzeti Bajnokság II	17	3	?	?	—		0	0	17	3
Haladás	2001–02	Nemzeti Bajnokság I	35	8	?	?	—		0	0	35	8
Haladás	Total		52	11	0	0	0	0	0	0	52	11
Ferencváros	2002–03	Nemzeti Bajnokság I	29	4	5	0	5	0	0	0	39	4
Ferencváros	2003–04	Nemzeti Bajnokság I	30	3	4	0	4	0	0	0	38	3
Ferencváros	2004–05	Nemzeti Bajnokság I	11	0	1	0	7	0	0	0	19	0
Ferencváros	2005–06	Nemzeti Bajnokság I	15	0	?	?	?	?	0	0	15	0
Ferencváros	Total		85	7	10+	0+	16+	0+	0	0	111	7
Paranaense	2005	Campeonato Brasileiro Série A	4	0	?	?	—		0	0	4	0
Debrecen	2006–07	Nemzeti Bajnokság I	26	7	8	0	0	0	0	0	34	7
Debrecen	2007–08	Nemzeti Bajnokság I	27	8	7	3	2	0	3	1	39	11
Debrecen	2008–09	Nemzeti Bajnokság I	29	5	3	1	4	0	1	0	37	6
Debrecen	2009–10	Nemzeti Bajnokság I	13	3	1	0	9	1	0	0	23	4
Debrecen	Total		95	23	19	4	15	1	4	1	133	29
Omonia	2009–10	Cypriot First Division	15	1	0	0	0	0	0	0	15	1
Omonia	2010–11	Cypriot First Division	28	4	4	2	6	2	1	1	39	9
Omonia	2011–12	Cypriot First Division	16	1	3	0	4	1	1	0	24	2
Omonia	2012–13	Cypriot First Division	30	6	6	0	2	0	1	1	39	7
Omonia	2013–14	Cypriot First Division	26	2	3	0	2	0	0	0	31	2
Omonia	2014–15	Cypriot First Division	17	3	3	1	—		0	0	20	4
Omonia	Total		132	17	19	3	14	3	3	2	168	25
Ferencváros	2015–16	Nemzeti Bajnokság I	30	2	5	1	4	0	1	0	40	3
Ferencváros	2016–17	Nemzeti Bajnokság I	25	2	6	2	2	0	0	0	33	4
Ferencváros	2017–18	Nemzeti Bajnokság I	25	1	2	1	3	0	0	0	30	2
Ferencváros	2018–19	Nemzeti Bajnokság I	29	1	5	1	1	0	0	0	35	2
Ferencváros	2019–20	Nemzeti Bajnokság I	9	2	3	1	0	0	0	0	12	3
Ferencváros	2020–21	Nemzeti Bajnokság I	0	0	1	0	0	0	0	0	1	0
Ferencváros	2021–22	Nemzeti Bajnokság I	0	0	1	0	0	0	0	0	1	0
Ferencváros	Total		118	8	23	6	10	0	1	0	152	14
Career total			498	66	71	13	55	4	8	3	632	86

=== International ===
National team	Year	Apps	Goals
Hungary	2004	3	0
Hungary	2005	2	0
Hungary	2006	1	0
Hungary	2007	4	0
Hungary	2014	1	0
Hungary	2015	5	0
Total		16	0

International appearances
#	Date	Venue	Opponent	Result	Competition
1	1 June 2004	Tianjin	China	1–2	Friendly
2	6 June 2004	Kaiserslautern	Germany	2–0	Friendly
3	18 August 2004	Glasgow	Scotland	3–0	Friendly
4	2 February 2005	Istanbul	Saudi Arabia	0–0	Friendly
5	9 February 2005	Cardiff	Wales	0–2	Friendly
6	10 October 2006	Valletta	Malta	1–2	UEFA Euro 2008 Qual.
7	22 August 2007	Budapest	Italy	3–1	Friendly
8	13 October 2007	Budapest	Malta	2–0	UEFA Euro 2008 Qual.
9	17 October 2007	Łódź	Poland	1–0	Friendly
10	21 November 2007	Budapest	Greece	1–2	UEFA Euro 2008 Qual.
11	5 March 2014	Győr	Finland	1–2	Friendly
12	29 March 2015	Budapest	Greece	0–0	UEFA Euro 2016 Qual.
13	5 June 2015	Debrecen	Lithuania	4–0	Friendly
14	4 September 2015	Budapest	Romania	0–0	UEFA Euro 2016 Qual.
15	7 September 2015	Belfast	Northern Ireland	1–1	UEFA Euro 2016 Qual.
16	11 October 2015	Athens	Greece	3–4	UEFA Euro 2016 Qual.

== Honours ==
MTK Hungária

- Magyar Kupa: 1999–2000

Ferencvárosi

- Nemzeti Bajnokság I: 2003–04
- Magyar Kupa: 2002–03, 2003–04, 2015–16, 2016–17

Atlético Paranaense

- Campeonato Paranaense: 2005

Debrecen

- Nemzeti Bajnokság I: 2006–07, 2008–09
- Magyar Kupa: 2007–08
- Szuperkupa: 2007, 2009

Omonia

- Cypriot First Division: 2009–10
- Cypriot Cup: 2010–11, 2011–12
- Cypriot Super Cup: 2010, 2012
