= Igor Bogdanović =

Serbian footballer

Personal information
- Full name: Igor Bogdanović
- Date of birth: 25 September 1974 (age 52)
- Place of birth: Novi Sad, SFR Yugoslavia
- Height: 1.82 m (6 ft 0 in)
- Position: Striker

Youth career
- Vojvodina

Senior career*
Years	Team	Apps	(Gls)
1992–1995	Vojvodina	14	(3)
1992–1993	→ Kabel (loan)		
1994–1995	→ Borac Čačak (loan)	19	(5)
1995–1997	Zemun	52	(18)
1997–1998	Litex Lovech	24	(11)
1999–2002	Vojvodina	99	(37)
2002–2003	Red Star Belgrade	16	(3)
2004–2009	Debrecen	79	(34)
2005	→ Gençlerbirliği (loan)	4	(2)
2007	→ Budapest Honvéd (loan)	11	(6)
2007	→ Győr (loan)	14	(5)
2008–2009	Debrecen II	2	(0)
2009	Nyíregyháza Spartacus	13	(2)
2010	Szombathelyi Haladás	10	(2)
2010–2015	Hajdúböszörmény	130	(64)
2015–2019	Balkány	81	(82)
Total		568	(274)

International career
2001	FR Yugoslavia	2	(0)
- * Club domestic league appearances and goals

Igor Bogdanović (Serbian Cyrillic: Игор Богдановић; born 25 September 1974) is a Serbian retired footballer who played as a striker.

== Club career ==
During his journeyman career, Bogdanović played for numerous clubs in his country and abroad, winning league titles in Bulgaria (Litex Lovech) and Hungary (Debrecen). He ended his career playing in the lower leagues of Hungary.

== International career ==
At international level, Bogdanović was capped twice for FR Yugoslavia, making both appearances at the 2001 Kirin Cup. He previously played at the Millennium Super Soccer Cup, scoring two goals in five games and helping the team win the tournament. However, these caps are not officially recognized by FIFA.

== Career statistics ==
=== Club ===
Club	Season	League	
Club	Season	Apps	Goals
Kabel (loan)	1992–93		
Vojvodina	1993–94	14	3
Borac Čačak (loan)	1994–95	19	5
Zemun	1995–96	30	14
Zemun	1996–97	22	4
Litex Lovech	1997–98	15	6
Litex Lovech	1998–99	9	5
Vojvodina	1998–99	7	3
Vojvodina	1999–2000	28	7
Vojvodina	2000–01	31	13
Vojvodina	2001–02	33	14
Red Star Belgrade	2002–03	16	3
Red Star Belgrade	2003–04	0	0
Debrecen	2003–04	14	7
Debrecen	2004–05	30	15
Gençlerbirliği (loan)	2005–06	4	2
Debrecen	2005–06	17	8
Debrecen	2006–07	11	1
Budapest Honvéd (loan)	2006–07	11	6
Győr (loan)	2007–08	14	5
Debrecen	2007–08	7	3
Debrecen	2008–09	0	0
Debrecen II	2008–09	2	0
Nyíregyháza Spartacus	2009–10	13	2
Szombathelyi Haladás	2009–10	10	2
Hajdúböszörmény	2010–11	26	3
Hajdúböszörmény	2011–12	30	21
Hajdúböszörmény	2012–13	23	21
Hajdúböszörmény	2013–14	29	10
Hajdúböszörmény	2014–15	22	9
Balkány	2015–16	30	49
Balkány	2016–17	29	28
Balkány	2017–18	6	4
Balkány	2018–19	16	1
Career total		568	274

=== International ===
National team	Year	Apps	Goals
FR Yugoslavia	2001	2	0
Total		2	0

== Honours ==
Litex Lovech

- A Group: 1997–98

Debrecen

- Nemzeti Bajnokság I: 2004–05, 2005–06
- Magyar Kupa: 2007–08
- Szuperkupa: 2005, 2006
