= Zsombor Kerekes =

Hungarian footballer

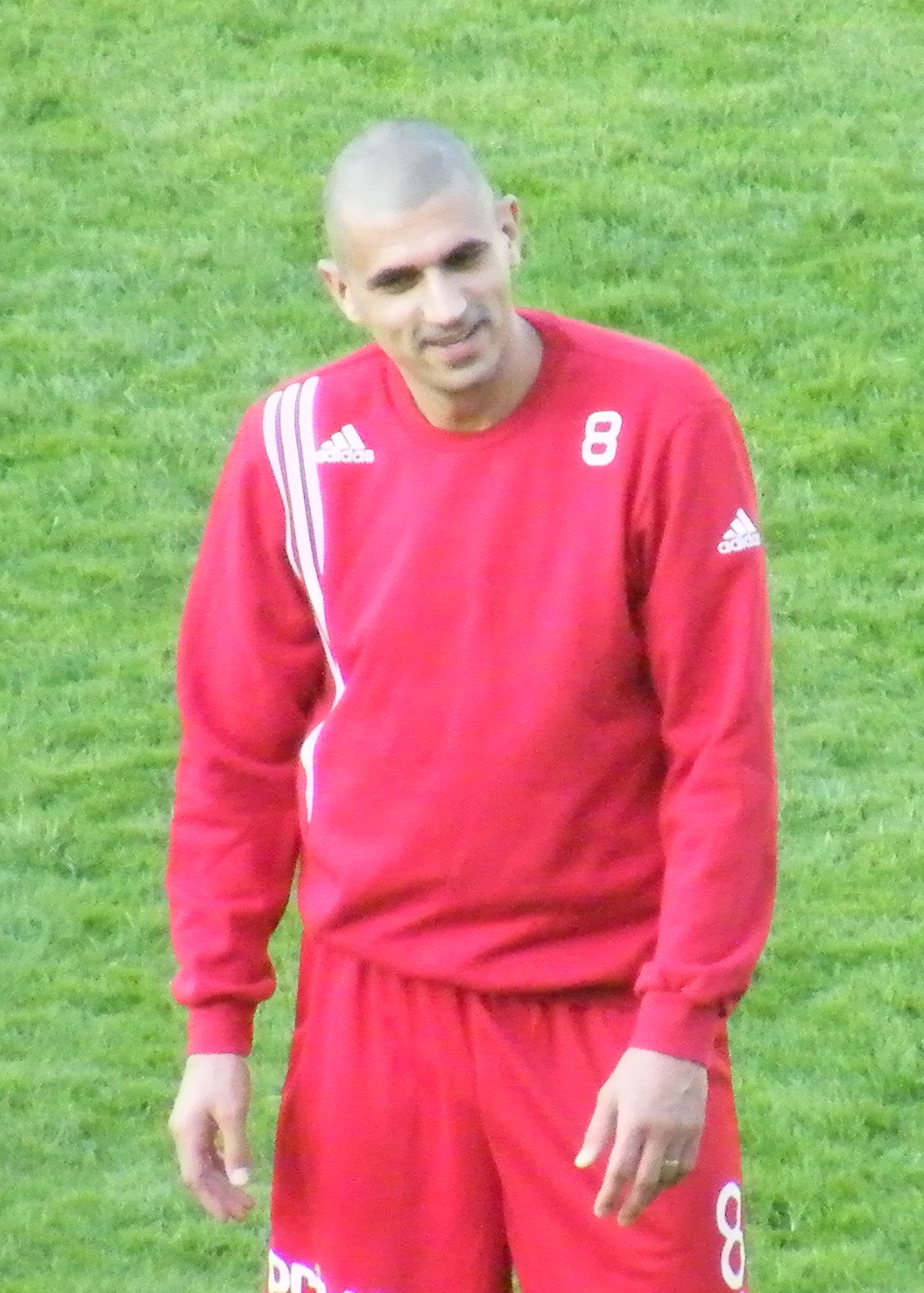
- Kerekes with Debrecen in 2009

Personal information
- Full name: Zsombor Kerekes
- Date of birth: 13 September 1973 (age 53)
- Place of birth: Senta, SR Serbia, SFR Yugoslavia
- Height: 1.93 m (6 ft 4 in)
- Position: Forward

Senior career*
Years	Team	Apps	(Gls)
1991–1992	Bečej	3	(0)
1999	Nagykanizsa	16	(2)
2000–2002	Debrecen	83	(32)
2003	Tianjin Kangshifu	10	(1)
2004	Pécs	16	(8)
2004–2005	Debrecen	27	(12)
2005–2007	Willem II	27	(3)
2007–2009	Debrecen	35	(12)
2010–2011	Báránd	30	(31)
2011–2014	Debreceni EAC	43	(52)
2015–2017	Debreceni EAC	2	(0)
Total		292	(153)

International career
2004–2005	Hungary	9	(2)
- * Club domestic league appearances and goals

Zsombor Kerekes (Serbian: Жомбор Керекеш / Žombor Kerekeš; born 13 September 1973) is a former professional footballer who played as a forward.

Born in Serbia to Hungarian parents, Kerekes represented the Hungary national team.

== Club career ==
Kerekes made his senior debut with Bečej in the 1991–92 Yugoslav Second League, appearing in three games, as the club finished as champions and earned promotion to the top flight for the first time in history.

In the summer of 1999, Kerekes moved to Hungary to play for Nagykanizsa. He was transferred to fellow NB I club Debrecen in the 2000 winter transfer season. In early 2003, Kerekes moved to China and signed with Tianjin Kangshifu. He would later play for Debrecen on two more occasions, winning two championships (2004–05 and 2008–09). In his late 30s and early 40s, Kerekes played in the lower leagues of Hungarian football.

== International career ==
At international level, Kerekes was capped nine times for Hungary, scoring two goals. He made his debut on 30 November 2004 in a 1–0 friendly loss to Slovakia in Bangkok. His last cap came on 8 October 2005 in a World Cup qualifier away against Bulgaria, as Hungary lost 2–0.

== Career statistics ==
Appearances and goals by national team and year
National team	Year	Apps	Goals
Hungary	2004	2	1
Hungary	2005	7	1
Total		9	2

== Honours ==
Debrecen

- Nemzeti Bajnokság I: 2004–05, 2008–09
- Magyar Kupa: 2000–01, 2007–08
