= Péter Czvitkovics =

Hungarian footballer (born 1983)

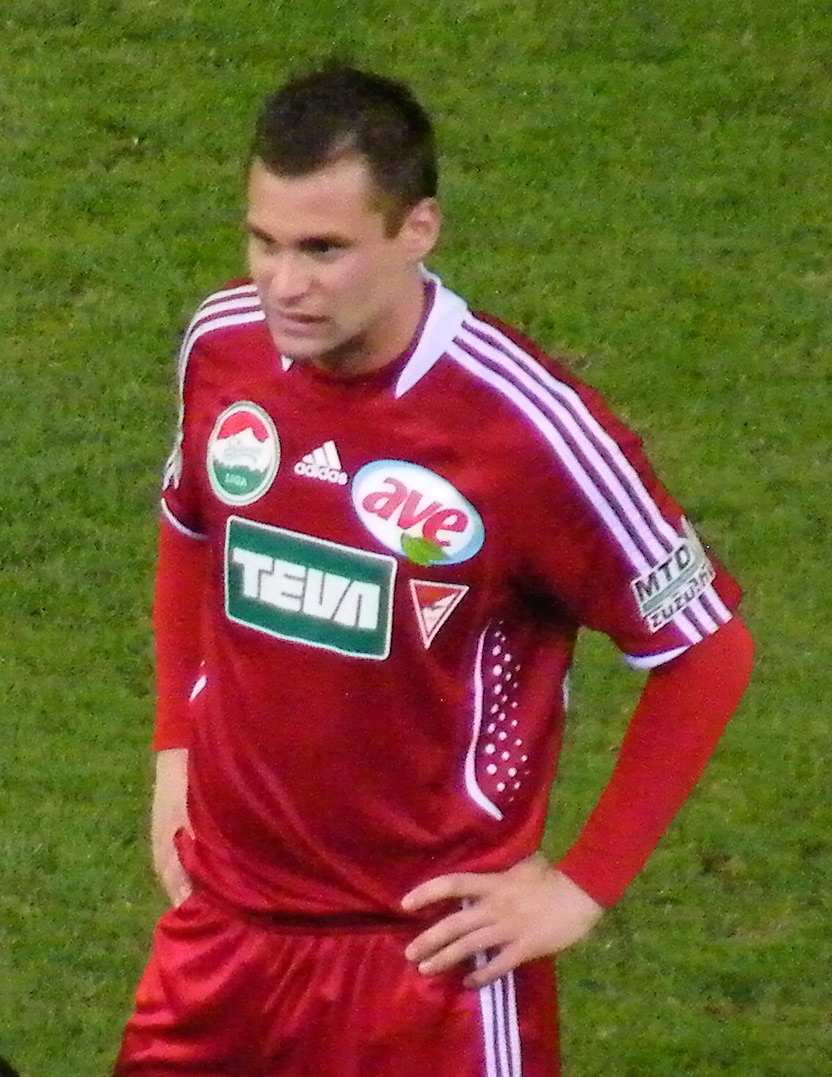

Personal information
- Full name: Péter Czvitkovics
- Date of birth: 10 February 1983 (age 43)
- Place of birth: Székesfehérvár, Hungary
- Height: 1.79 m (5 ft 10 in)
- Position: Right winger

Team information
- Current team: Unione FC (player); III. Kerületi (assistant coach)
- Number: 9

Youth career
- Videoton
- MTK

Senior career*
Years	Team	Apps	(Gls)
1998–2007	MTK	157	(28)
2007–2011	Debrecen	97	(33)
2011–2012	Kortrijk	16	(1)
2012–2013	Debrecen	17	(0)
2013–2015	Puskás	36	(2)
2015–2016	Vasas	19	(1)
2017	Siófok	12	(0)
2017–2019	Budaörs	64	(20)
2019–2021	III. Kerületi	45	(7)
2021–	Unione FC	12	(4)

International career
1996–1997	Hungary U-14	4	(3)
1998–2000	Hungary U-16	26	(8)
2006–2010	Hungary	10	(0)

Managerial career
- 2019–: III. Kerületi (assistant)
- * Club domestic league appearances and goals as of 20:08, 3 February 2022 (UTC)

Péter Czvitkovics (Hungarian pronunciation: [ˈpeːtɛr ˈt͡svitkovit͡ʃ]; Serbian: Петер Цвитковић, romanized: Peter Cvitković; born 10 February 1983) is a Hungarian footballer who plays for Hungarian amateur club Unione FC as a right winger. He is also the assistant coach of III. Kerületi TVE

== Career ==
Ahead of the 2019/20 season, Czvitkovics joined III. Kerületi TVE as a playing assistant coach. In the summer 2021 it was confirmed, that Czvitkovics would continue his playing career at Unione FC alongside his coaching duties at Kerületi.

== Career statistics ==
Season	Club	Country	Competition	Matches	Goals
1998–99	MTK	Hungary	NB1	3	0
1999–00	MTK	Hungary	NB1	1	0
2000–01	MTK	Hungary	NB1	4	1
2001–02	MTK	Hungary	NB1	25	4
2002–03	MTK	Hungary	NB1	29	4
2003–04	MTK	Hungary	NB1	19	4
2004–05	MTK	Hungary	NB1	17	3
2005–06	MTK	Hungary	NB1	30	10
2006–07	MTK	Hungary	NB1	29	2
2007–08	Debrecen	Hungary	NB1	20	6
2008–09	Debrecen	Hungary	NB1	24	7
2009–10	Debrecen	Hungary	NB1	28	10
2010–11	Debrecen	Hungary	NB1	25	10
2011–12	Kortrijk	Belgium	Pro League	16	1
2012–13	Debrecen	Hungary	NB1	17	0
2013–14	Puskás	Hungary	NB1	25	2
2014–15	Puskás	Hungary	NB1	11	0
2014–15	Vasas	Hungary	NB2	13	5
2015–16	Vasas	Hungary	NB1	8	0
			Total	324	69

== National team ==
Czvitkovics made his debut on 10 October 2006 in Valletta against Malta.

(Statistics correct as of 16 August 2009)

National Team Performance
Team	Year	Friendlies		International Competition		Total
Team	Year	App	Goals	App	Goals	App	Goals
Hungary	2006	0	0	1	0	1	0
Total		0	0	1	0	1	0

== International matches ==
International Matches
#	Date	Venue	Opponent	Result	Competition
1	10 October 2006	Valletta	Malta	1–2	UEFA Euro 2008 Qual.

== Honours ==
=== Club ===
- MTK Hungária FC
  - Nemzeti Bajnokság I: 1998–99, 2002–03
  - Hungarian Cup: 1999–00
  - Hungarian Super Cup: 2003
- Debreceni VSC
  - Nemzeti Bajnokság I: 2008–09, 2009–10
  - Hungarian Cup: 2007–08, 2009–10, 2012–13
  - Hungarian Super Cup: 2009, 2010
  - Hungarian League Cup: 2010

=== Individual ===
- Nemzeti Sport Team of the Season (5): 2007–08, 2008–09, 2009–10, 2010–11 Autumn Season, 2010–11
- Zilahi Prize: 2010
