= Róbert Nagy (footballer) =

Hungarian footballer

Personal information
- Full name: Róbert Nagy
- Date of birth: 26 November 1987 (age 38)
- Place of birth: Debrecen, Hungary
- Height: 1.77 m (5 ft 10 in)
- Positions: Winger; midfielder

Team information
- Current team: Berettyóújfalui SE
- Number: 9

Youth career
- 2002–2005: Debreceni VSC

Senior career*
| Years | Team | Apps | (Gls) |
| 2005-2006 | Létavértes SC '97 | 12 | (3) |
| 2007 | DVSC ligacsapat | 6 | (0) |
| 2007–2009 | Debreceni VSC | 1 | (0) |
| 2007–2009 | → DVSC-DEAC (loan) | 56 | (15) |
| 2009–2010 | Diósgyőri VTK | 8 | (0) |
| 2009 | → DVTK-HOLCIM (loan) | 1 | (2) |
| 2010–2014 | Balmazújvárosi FC | 137 | (28) |
| 2014–2016 | Kisvárda FC | 51 | (18) |
| 2015 | → Kazincbarcikai SC (loan) | 10 | (0) |
| 2016–2017 | Cigánd SE | 15 | (0) |
| 2017 | Hajdúböszörményi TE | 11 | (1) |
| 2017–2018 | FC Tiszaújváros | 12 | (0) |
| 2018–2019 | Debreceni EAC | 38 | (3) |
| 2019- | Berettyóújfalui SE | 81 | (16) |
- * Club domestic league appearances and goals as of 4 March 2023

Róbert Nagy (born 26 November 1987 in Debrecen) is a Hungarian football player who currently plays for Berettyóújfalui SE.
