= Lóránt Oláh =

Serbian-born Hungarian footballer

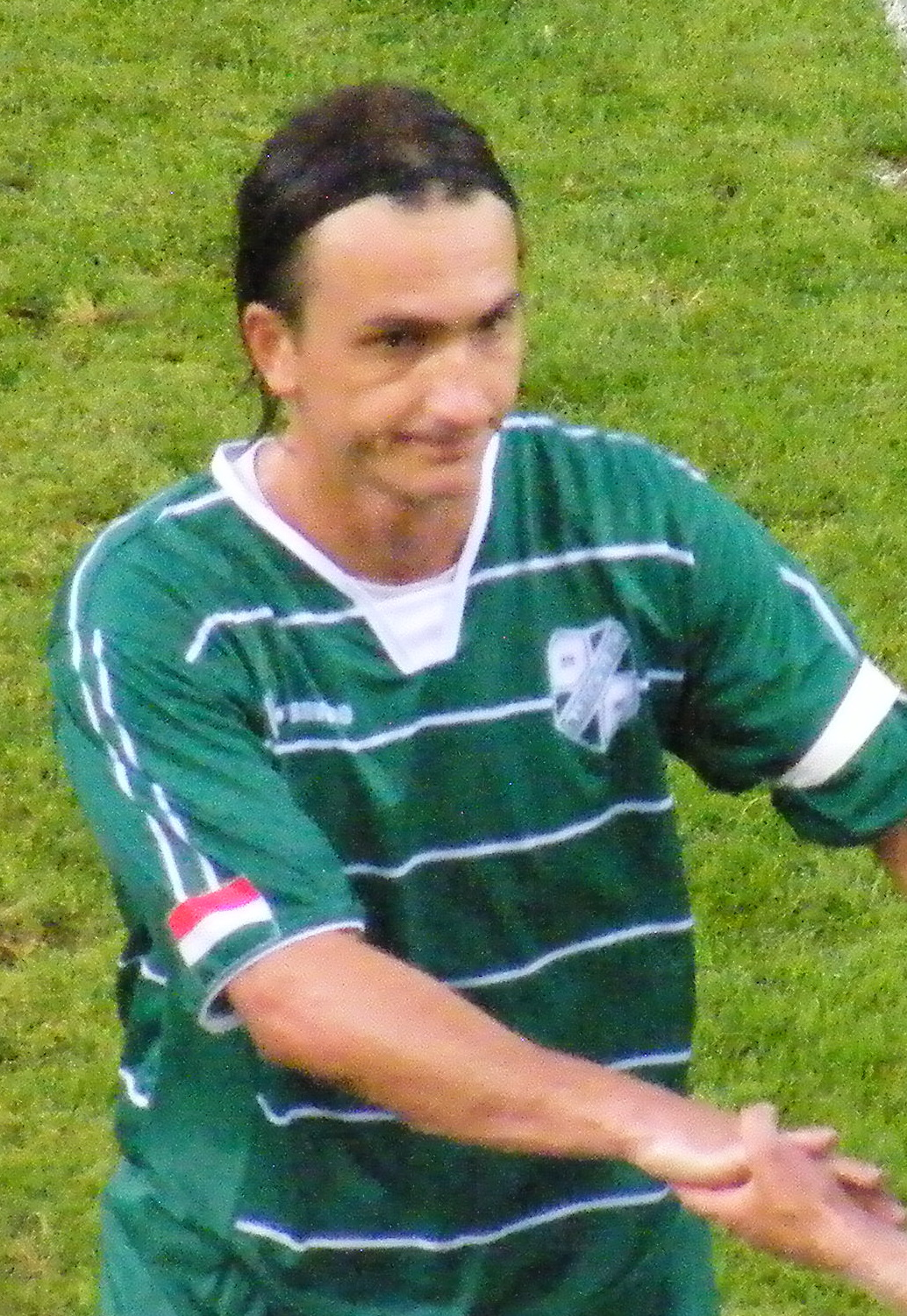
- Oláh with Kaposvár in 2010

Personal information
- Date of birth: 23 November 1979 (age 46)
- Place of birth: Ada, SFR Yugoslavia
- Height: 1.80 m (5 ft 11 in)
- Position: Striker

Youth career
- AFK Ada

Senior career*
Years	Team	Apps	(Gls)
1998–1999	Solunac Karađorđevo		
1999	Szeged LC	7	(0)
2000	Vojvodina	5	(0)
2000–2002	Solunac Karađorđevo		
2002–2003	Szolnok MÁV		
2003–2008	Kaposvár Rákóczi	109	(49)
2008–2009	Debrecen	35	(14)
2010–2013	Kaposvár Rákóczi	82	(24)
2011–2012	→ Ferencváros (loan)	16	(2)
2014	Kozármisleny	13	(4)
2014–2015	Szeged 2011	33	(8)
2016–2017	Budafok	53	(24)
Total		348	(125)
- * Club domestic league appearances and goals

Lóránt Oláh (Serbian: Лорант Олах / Lorant Olah; born 23 November 1979) is a Serbian-born Hungarian retired footballer who played as a striker.

== Career ==
After playing for Solunac Karađorđevo, Oláh moved to Hungary and joined Nemzeti Bajnokság I club Szeged in the summer of 1999. He subsequently returned to FR Yugoslavia and played for Vojvodina in the latter part of the 1999–2000 season. After spending two years at Solunac Karađorđevo, Oláh moved to Hungary for the second time and signed with Szolnok in the summer of 2002. He spent one season at the club, before switching to Kaposvár and helping them win promotion to the top flight in 2004. Over the following four seasons (2004–2008), Oláh amassed 109 appearances and scored 49 goals for the side. He subsequently signed with fellow Nemzeti Bajnokság I club Debrecen, helping them win the title in the 2008–09 season. In the 2010 winter transfer window, Oláh returned to his former club Kaposvár.

== Career statistics ==
Appearances and goals by club, season and competition
Club	Season	League	
Club	Season	Apps	Goals
Szeged LC	1999–2000	7	0
Vojvodina	1999–2000	5	0
Szolnok	2002–03		
Kaposvár	2003–04		
Kaposvár	2004–05	29	15
Kaposvár	2005–06	22	6
Kaposvár	2006–07	29	12
Kaposvár	2007–08	29	16
Kaposvár	Total	109	49
Debrecen	2008–09	26	12
Debrecen	2009–10	9	2
Debrecen	Total	35	14
Kaposvár	2009–10	15	3
Kaposvár	2010–11	27	13
Kaposvár	2012–13	27	8
Kaposvár	2013–14	13	0
Kaposvár	Total	82	24
Ferencváros (loan)	2011–12	16	2
Kozármisleny	2013–14	13	4
Szeged 2011	2014–15	27	8
Szeged 2011	2015–16	6	0
Szeged 2011	Total	33	8
Budafok	2015–16	16	8
Budafok	2016–17	32	16
Budafok	2017–18	5	0
Budafok	Total	53	24
Career total		353	125

== Honours ==
Debrecen

- Nemzeti Bajnokság I: 2008–09

Budafok

- Nemzeti Bajnokság III: 2016–17
