= 2007–08 Magyar Kupa =

Tournament details
- Country: Hungary

Final positions
- Champions: Debrecen (3rd title)
- Runners-up: Budapest Honvéd

The 2007–08 Magyar Kupa (English: Hungarian Cup) was the 68th season of Hungary's annual knock-out cup football competition.

== Third round ==
The legs were played on 28 and 29 August, 5 September 2007.

Team 1	Score	Team 2
Eger	0–3	Diósgyőr
Ferencváros	0–0	Paks
Mosonmagyaróvár	2–3	Tatabánya
Celldömölk	0–3	Sopron
Veszprém	2–3	Integrál-DAC
Bonyhád	0–10	Zalaegerszeg
Szekszárd	2–2	Siófok
Komló	1–3	Kaposvár
Kaposvölgye	3–1	Pécs
Andráshida	1–0	Barcs
Letenye	2–2	Balatonlelle
Mór	4–0	Budafok
Budaörs	1–0	Soroksár
Velence	4–0	Zsámbék
Putnok	2–0	Baktalórántháza
Nagyecsed	0–2	Mezőkövesd
Kemecse	0–1	Kazincbarcika
Demecser	0–1	Cigánd
Martfű	1–8	Békéscsaba
BKV Előre	0–5	Fehérvár
Pénzügyőr	2–2	Vác-Újbuda
Sárosd	2–8	Rákospalota
Felcsút	3–1	Újpest
Gyirmót	1–1 (a.e.t.) (4–2 p)	Haladás
Orosháza	1–2	Kecskemét
Jánosháza	0–7	Győr
Ásotthalom	0–5	SZEOL
Bőcs	0–2	Nyíregyháza
Hatvan	0–10	Vasas

== Round of 32 ==
The legs were played on 25 and 26 September 2007.

Team 1	Score	Team 2
Kazincbarcika	2–1	Rákospalota
Budaörs	1–1 (3–4 p)	Kaposvölgye
Mór	2–3	Sopron
Andráshida	0–3	Győr
Integrál-DAC	2–1	Zalaegerszeg
Velence	0–12	Fehérvár
Szekszárd	7–0	Letenye
SZEOL	1–4	Budapest Honvéd
Putnok	0–0	MTK Budapest
Cigánd	0–5	Vasas
Mezőkövesd	1–3	Diósgyőr
Pénzügyőr	1–7	Kaposvár
Kecskemét	2–4	Debrecen
Felcsút	0–1	Ferencváros
Békéscsaba	2–5	Nyíregyháza
Gyirmót	2–2	Tatabánya

== Round of 16 ==
The first legs were played on 23 and 24 October, and the second legs were played on 6 and 7 November 2007.

Team 1	Agg.	Team 2	1st leg	2nd leg
Szekszárd	0–11	Integrál-DAC	0–4	0–7
Kaposvölgye	4–11	Debrecen	2–5	2–6
Kazincbarcika	4–1	Diósgyőr	3–1	1–1
Putnok	2–6	Vasas	1–3	1–3
Győr	3–4	Fehérvár	1–1	2–3
Ferencváros	3–4	Kaposvár	2–2	1–2
Gyirmót	2–1	Nyíregyháza	2–0	0–1
Budapest Honvéd	5–1	Sopron	2–1	3–0

== Quarter-finals ==
The first legs were played on March 18 and 19, 2008, while the second legs were played on March 25 and 27.

Team 1	Agg.	Team 2	1st leg	2nd leg
Kazincbarcika	4–6	Budapest Honvéd	2–2	2–4
Integrál-DAC	2–2 (a)	Vasas	0–1	2–1
Gyirmót	2–7	Kaposvár	2–4	0–3
Fehérvár	3–4	Debrecen	2–1	1–3

== Semi-finals ==
The first legs were played on April 1 and 2, 2008, while the second legs were played on April 8 and 9.

Team 1	Agg.	Team 2	1st leg	2nd leg
Budapest Honvéd	6–1	Kaposvár	4–0	2–1
Integrál-DAC	1–10	Debrecen	1–4	0–6

== Final ==
4 June 2008
20:00 (UTC+2)

Debrecen (I)	2–1	Budapest Honvéd (I)
Czvitkovics 74'; Leandro 76'	Report	Filó 39'

Stadion Oláh Gábor Út, Debrecen
Attendance: 7,000
Referee: István Vad (Hungary)
28 May 2008
20:00 (UTC+2)

Budapest Honvéd (I)	0–7	Debrecen (I)
	Report	Leandro 9'; Rudolf 17'; Czvitkovics 29', 82'; Kouemaha 58', 77', 89'

Bozsik József Stadion, Budapest
Attendance: 2,500
Referee: Viktor Kassai (Hungary)

== See also ==
- 2007–08 Nemzeti Bajnokság I
- 2007–08 Nemzeti Bajnokság II
- 2007–08 Nemzeti Bajnokság III
