= Gergely Rudolf =

Hungarian footballer (born 1985)

Rudolf Gergely
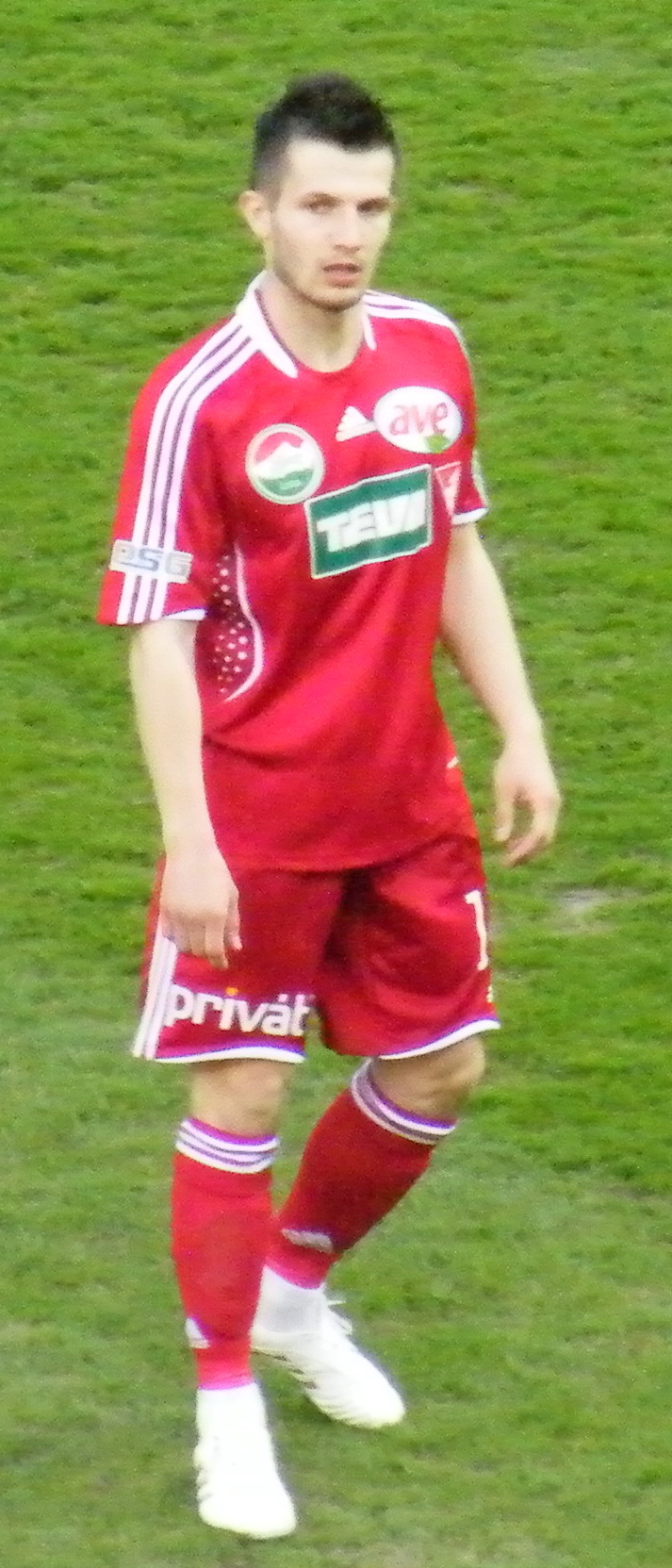
- Rudolf playing for Debrecen

Personal information
- Date of birth: 9 March 1985 (age 41)
- Place of birth: Nyíregyháza, Hungary
- Height: 1.77 m (5 ft 10 in)
- Position: Forward

Youth career
- 1993–1999: Nyíregyháza
- 1999–2002: Nancy

Senior career*
Years	Team	Apps	(Gls)
2002–2007	Nancy B	82	(26)
2005–2007	Nancy	5	(0)
2007–2010	Debrecen	52	(25)
2010–2012	Genoa	12	(1)
2011	→ Bari (loan)	13	(2)
2011–2012	→ Panathinaikos (loan)	8	(1)
2012–2013	Diósgyőr	18	(1)
2013–2015	Győri ETO	41	(14)
2015–2016	Videoton	7	(0)
2016–2018	Nyíregyháza	39	(10)
2018	Balmazújváros	9	(2)
Total		278	(81)

International career
2001–2002	Hungary U17	3	(0)
2003–2004	Hungary U19	6	(2)
2008–2014	Hungary	28	(10)
- * Club domestic league appearances and goals

Gergely Rudolf (Hungarian: [ˈɡɛrɡɛj ˈrudolf]; born 9 March 1985) is a Hungarian former professional footballer who played as a forward.

== Club career ==
Rudolf was born in Nyíregyháza.

=== Debrecen ===
Rudolf signed a contract with the Hungarian champion Debrecen in 2007.

His first trophy was won against Budapest Honvéd by 4–1 on aggregate. The first leg finished 1–1 in the Bozsik Stadion. In the UEFA Champions League 2007–08 season Debrecen entered in the second qualifying round. Debrecen faced the Swedish champion IF Elfsborg. Debrecen were eliminated from the Champions League 1–0 on aggregate. In the Hungarian League 2007–08 season Rudolf's team finished second while MTK became first. Debrecen won the Hungarian Cup in the 2007–08 season by beating Budapest Honvéd in the final 9–1 on aggregate.

Debrecen played in the 2008–09 UEFA Cup. In the first round of the Central-East region they drew in Kazakhstan against Shakhter Karagandy 1–1, while in the second leg they beat the Kazakh team by 1–0. Debrecen qualified for the second round by 2–1 on aggregate. In the second round Debrecen faced the Swiss BSC Young Boys. Debrecen were eliminated from the UEFA Cup by 3–7 on aggregate. Rudolf won the 2008–09 Nemzeti Bajnokság I season after beating their provincial rivals Diósgyőri VTK 3–2 away.

In the 2009–10 season, Debrecen played in the UEFA Champions League. After beating Kalmar FF, Levadia Tallinn, and Levski Sofia Debrecen reached the group stages of the 2009–10 UEFA Champions League season. Rudolf scored a goal against Levski in the Puskás Ferenc Stadium. He was also successful against Fiorentina in the Champions League, a goal in Budapest and another in Florence. In 2010, it was obvious that Rudolf was going to leave Debrecen.

=== Genoa ===
In the summer of 2010 Rudolf signed a contract with Serie A club Genoa C.F.C. In the 2010–11 Serie A season Rudolf played 17 matches for Genoa. On 16 October 2010, he scored his first Serie A goal against AS Roma at the Stadio Olimpico, while Genoa lost 2–1. On 11 December Rudolf played his last match for Genoa against Napoli. In the second half of the season Rudolf was loaned by Genoa to fellow Serie A club AS Bari. In summer 2011 it was announced that Rudolf had been loaned to Panathinaikos F.C. for the 2011–12 season. In summer 2012 Rudolf terminated his contract with the Italian club.

=== Bari ===
Rudolf scored his first goal for Bari in Serie A against Juventus in his debut match which Bari lost 2–1. He scored his second goal against AC Milan in the Stadio Giuseppe Meazza in front of the 48,000 spectators on 13 March 2011. The final result of the match was 1–1.

=== Panathinaikos ===
Rudolf signed a one-year loan contract with Panathinaikos on 31 August 2011, the last day of the 2011–12 summer transfer window. He was officially presented to the fans on 14 September 2011. On 1 April 2012, he scored his first goal for the club in a 1–0 win against Aris

=== Diósgyőr ===
On 12 September 2012, Rudolf signed a three-year contract with Hungarian League club Diósgyőri VTK. He became the most valuable player of the 2012–13 Nemzeti Bajnokság season. On 13 August 2013, he terminated his contract with Diósgyőr claiming that he was not happy playing for them after Tomislav Sivić became the head coach of the Borsod county team. Rudolf was unable to be regain his position at the national team in his spell in Miskolc. He was able to score only once wearing Diósgyőr's shirt, a big disappointment for the club.

=== Győr ===
On 2 September 2013, Rudolf joined league rivals Győri ETO FC signing a three-year contract with the 2012–13 Hungarian League winners. He scored his first goal wearing Győr's shirt against MTK Budapest in a 2–1 victory at the Hidegkuti Nándor Stadium on 15 September 2013.

=== Videoton ===
On 23 July 2015, Rudolf signed for Nemzeti Bajnokság I club Videoton FC. On 16 March 2016, he was banned from attending training at Videoton due to his low performance. Five days later, Videoton agreed to the termination of his contract. Zoltán Kovács, sports director for Videoton, said that Rudolf was unable to perform at that level the club had expected from him. Therefore, the termination of the contract was the best choice for both parties.

=== Nyíregyháza Spartacus ===
After almost four months of being a free agent, he signed for Nyíregyháza Spartacus FC. He stayed at the club until JAnuary 2018.

=== Balmazújvárosi FC ===
On 12 January 2018, he signed for Balmazújvárosi FC.

== International career ==
Rudolf's path to the national team began in the under-17 team in 2001 to 2002. The following two years, he played for the under-19 team.

Rudolf was a regular member of the Hungary national team squad in qualification for 2010 FIFA World Cup, and scored one of the goals in the 2–1 away defeat of Sweden on 10 September 2008. He also provided the assist for Ákos Buzsáky's goal in a qualification against Denmark on 14 October 2009.

He scored his second international goal against Moldova in the Szusza Ferenc Stadium while Hungary beat Moldova 2–1 in the Euro 2012 qualifier. He netted twice against the San Marino in the Puskás Ferenc Stadium in the Euro 2012 qualifier as Hungary beat San Marino 8–0 on home turf. Rudolf scored his sixth goal, the equaliser for 1–1 in 5–3 defeat to the Netherlands in the Euro 2012 qualifiers. Rudolf scored a goal in a 4–0 friendly win against Iceland in August On 2 September 2011, Rudolf scored against Sweden in the 90th minute helping his country to beat Sweden 2–1 in the Euro 2012 qualifiers. On 6 September, Rudolf scored the second goal in the Euro 2012 qualifier against Moldova, securing a 2–0 away victory 2–0.

Rudolf was called up to play for the national squad since, until early 2014, in which he scored a goal against Finland in his first match back with the team, in an eventual 2–1 loss.

== Career statistics ==
=== Club ===
As of matches played 2 June 2018

Appearances and goals by club, season and competition
Club	Season	League			Cup		League Cup		Europe		Total	
Club	Season	Division	Apps	Goals	Apps	Goals	Apps	Goals	Apps	Goals	Apps	Goals
Nancy	2005–06	Ligue 1	5	0	0	0	0	0	0	0	5	0
Debrecen	2007–08	Nemzeti Bajnokság I	13	2	3	3	12	2	0	0	28	7
Debrecen	2008–09	Nemzeti Bajnokság I	26	16	0	0	0	0	3	3	29	19
Debrecen	2009–10	Nemzeti Bajnokság I	13	7	0	0	1	1	10	3	24	11
Debrecen	Total		52	25	3	3	13	3	13	6	81	37
Genoa	2010–11	Serie A	12	1	3	0	0	0	0	0	15	1
Bari (loan)	2010–11	Serie A	13	2	0	0	0	0	0	0	13	2
Panathinaikos (loan)	2011–12	Super League Greece	8	1	2	0	0	0	0	0	10	1
Diósgyőr	2012–13	Nemzeti Bajnokság I	15	1	1	0	1	0	0	0	17	1
Diósgyőr	2013–14	Nemzeti Bajnokság I	3	0	0	0	0	0	0	0	3	0
Diósgyőr	Total		18	1	1	0	1	0	0	0	20	1
Győr	2013–14	Nemzeti Bajnokság I	16	7	4	1	4	5	0	0	24	13
Győr	2014–15	Nemzeti Bajnokság I	17	6	3	0	1	0	2	0	23	6
Győr	Total		33	13	7	1	5	5	2	0	47	19
Videoton	2015–16	Nemzeti Bajnokság I	7	0	1	0	0	0	1	0	9	0
Nyíregyháza	2016–17	Nemzeti Bajnokság II	28	9	0	0	0	0	0	0	28	9
Nyíregyháza	2017–18	Nemzeti Bajnokság II	11	1	3	0	0	0	0	0	14	1
Nyíregyháza	Total		39	10	3	0	0	0	0	0	42	10
Balmazújváros	2017–18	Nemzeti Bajnokság I	9	2	5	0	0	0	0	0	14	2
Career total			196	55	25	4	19	8	16	6	256	71

=== International ===
Appearances and goals by national team and year
National team	Year	Apps	Goals
Hungary	2008–09	7	1
Hungary	2009–10	4	0
Hungary	2010–11	6	3
Hungary	2010–11	3	2
Hungary	2011–12	1	1
Hungary	2011–12	2	2
Hungary	2012–13	1	0
Total		24	9

Scores and results list Hungary's goal tally first, score column indicates score after each Rudolf goal.

List of international goals scored by Gergely Rudolf
No.	Date	Venue	Opponent	Score	Result	Competition
1	10 September 2008	Stockholm, Sweden	Sweden	1–2	1–2	2010 FIFA World Cup qualification
2	7 September 2010	Szusza Ferenc Stadium, Budapest, Hungary	Moldova	1–0	2–1	UEFA Euro 2012 qualifying
3	8 October 2010	Puskás Ferenc Stadium, Budapest, Hungary	San Marino	1–0	8–0	UEFA Euro 2012 qualifying
4	8 October 2010	Puskás Ferenc Stadium, Budapest, Hungary	San Marino	3–0	8–0	UEFA Euro 2012 qualifying
5	9 February 2011	Stadium Al-shabab, Dubai, United Arab Emirates	Azerbaijan	1–0	2–0	Friendly
6	29 March 2011	Amsterdam Arena, Amsterdam, Netherlands	Netherlands	1–1	3–5	UEFA Euro 2012 qualifying
7	10 August 2011	Puskás Ferenc Stadium, Budapest, Hungary	Iceland	2–0	4–0	Friendly
8	2 September 2011	Puskás Ferenc Stadium, Budapest, Hungary	Sweden	2–1	2–1	UEFA Euro 2012 qualifying
9	6 September 2011	Zimbru Stadium, Chişinău, Moldova	Moldova	2–0	2–0	UEFA Euro 2012 qualifying
10	5 March 2014	ETO Park, Győr, Hungary	Finland	1–0	1–2	Friendly

== Honours ==
Nancy

- French League Cup: 2006

Debrecen

- Hungarian National Championship I: 2008–09, 2009–10
- Hungarian Cup: 2008–09, 2009–10
- Hungarian Super Cup: 2009
- Hungarian League Cup: 2010

Individual

- Named in the Hungarian National Championship I all-star team (nemzetisport.hu): 2008–09
- József Bozsik Prize: 2009
- Zilahi Prize: 2009
