= 2004–05 Nemzeti Bajnokság I =

Nemzeti Bajnokság I
- Season: 2004–05
- Dates: 7 August 2004 – 26 May 2005
- Champions: Debrecen
- Relegated: Nyíregyháza; Békéscsaba
- Champions League: Debrecen
- UEFA Cup: Ferencváros; Sopron
- Intertoto Cup: Vasas; Lombard Pápa
- Matches: 240
- Goals: 681 (2.84 per match)
- Top goalscorer: Tomáš Medveď (18)
- Biggest home win: Ferencvaros 5–0 Nyíregyháza; Zalaegerszegi 5–0 Kaposvári; Fehérvár 5–0 Békéscsaba; Pécsi 5–0 Békéscsaba
- Biggest away win: Vasas 0–6 Lombard Pápa
- Highest scoring: Fehérvár 5–3 Nyíregyháza

The 2004–05 Nemzeti Bajnokság I, also known as NB I, was the 103rd season of top-tier football in Hungary. The league was officially named Arany Ászok Liga for sponsoring reasons. The season started on 7 August 2004 and ended on 26 May 2005.

Debreceni VSC became the first eastern Hungarian club to win the top-flight, after finishing 6 points above runners-up Ferencváros and third-place MTK.

FTC started off the season better, winning 9 of their first 11 fixtures, and were leading the table four points ahead of Debrecen at one stage. The tide turned on Matchday 12, after Debreceni VSC achieved a 2–0 victory over Ferencváros, with a double from Igor Bogdanovic. FTC suffered subsequent losses to Győr, Fehérvár, MTK and Nyíregyháza, and by Matchday 20 DVSC were first place.

The Hajdú county-club's title was confirmed with two games to go, in the 28th round. While Debrecen hammered rival Békéscsaba 5-1, Ferencváros suffered a 2–0 loss at Pécs, and failed to retain their title from the previous season. Attila Supka became the first Hungarian manager to guide a provincial club to a national title since Oszkár Szigeti in 1983

== League standings ==
Pos	Team	Pld	W	D	L	GF	GA	GD	Pts	Qualification or relegation
1	Debrecen (C)	30	19	5	6	57	25	+32	62	Qualification for Champions League second qualifying round
2	Ferencváros	30	17	5	8	56	31	+25	56	Qualification for UEFA Cup first qualifying round
3	MTK Budapest (Note: Deducted 1 points)	30	16	9	5	47	26	+21	56	
4	Újpest	30	15	10	5	60	34	+26	55	
5	Győr	30	16	6	8	44	32	+12	54	
6	Zalaegerszeg	30	13	5	12	48	45	+3	44	
7	Sopron	30	11	9	10	44	44	0	42	Qualification for UEFA Cup first qualifying round
8	Fehérvár (Note: Deducted 3 points)	30	11	10	9	44	36	+8	40	
9	Diósgyőr	30	11	4	15	39	45	−6	37	
10	Pécs	30	9	9	12	33	35	−2	36	
11	Budapest Honvéd	30	10	5	15	37	58	−21	35	
12	Kaposvár	30	8	10	12	34	47	−13	34	
13	Vasas	30	10	3	17	34	48	−14	33	Qualification for Intertoto Cup first round
14	Lombard Pápa	30	8	6	16	40	47	−7	30	Qualification for Intertoto Cup first round
15	Nyíregyháza (R)	30	5	11	14	38	63	−25	26	Relegation to Nemzeti Bajnokság II
16	Békéscsaba (Note: Deducted 15 points) (R)	30	4	7	19	26	65	−39	4	Relegation to Nemzeti Bajnokság II

Source: rsssf.com
(C) Champions; (R) Relegated

== Results ==
Home \ Away	BÉK	HON	DEB	DIÓ	FEH	FTC	GYŐ	KAP	PÁP	MTK	NYÍ	PÉC	SOP	UTE	VAS	ZTE
Békéscsaba		3–0	0–2	0–2	0–0	0–3	1–1	2–3	1–1	0–1	2–3	2–1	3–3	0–5	3–0	1–3
Budapest Honvéd	2–0		1–2	2–1	1–0	0–1	2–3	1–1	3–2	1–1	3–2	2–1	2–1	1–1	1–0	3–3
Debrecen	5–1	2–0		1–0	3–0	2–0	1–3	2–1	3–1	3–0	2–1	3–1	3–0	1–2	3–1	2–0
Diósgyőr	1–0	5–1	0–2		3–1	2–3	2–3	2–0	1–3	2–2	0–1	1–0	1–0	1–3	0–0	2–1
Fehérvár	5–0	4–1	2–2	3–0		0–1	2–1	1–1	2–1	2–3	5–3	1–0	1–1	1–2	1–0	1–1
Ferencváros	2–0	4–0	0–0	2–1	0–1		0–1	1–1	5–0	2–1	5–0	1–1	4–1	1–1	2–0	4–2
Győr	2–0	1–0	1–0	2–1	0–0	2–4		0–1	3–0	1–1	3–1	2–0	1–0	1–1	2–1	4–1
Kaposvár	1–2	4–2	0–0	0–1	2–1	2–1	1–2		1–2	1–2	1–1	2–1	4–3	0–0	3–2	0–2
Lombard Pápa	2–0	1–0	1–1	1–2	2–2	1–2	1–2	4–1		0–1	0–0	1–1	0–0	1–2	2–0	1–2
MTK Budapest	1–1	3–0	2–0	0–0	2–2	3–1	1–0	0–0	1–0		3–0	1–1	3–0	3–1	2–1	2–0
Nyíregyháza	1–1	1–1	0–2	2–2	0–2	2–0	1–1	4–1	0–2	0–5		1–0	2–2	2–2	1–2	3–3
Pécs	5–0	3–1	1–1	2–1	0–2	2–0	1–1	0–0	2–1	1–0	1–1		2–3	1–0	1–0	1–0
Sopron	3–2	2–0	0–3	0–1	2–1	3–0	1–0	0–0	1–0	1–1	5–2	2–2		2–2	1–1	1–2
Újpest	3–0	1–2	2–0	4–1	3–0	1–1	4–1	1–1	3–1	2–0	3–3	1–1	1–4		4–0	3–2
Vasas	3–0	4–1	2–5	3–1	1–1	0–1	1–0	2–1	0–6	3–1	2–0	3–0	0–1	1–2		1–0
Zalaegerszeg	1–1	1–3	2–1	3–2	0–0	1–5	2–0	5–0	5–2	0–1	2–0	1–0	0–1	1–0	2–0	

Source: rsssf.com
Legend: Blue = home team win; Yellow = draw; Red = away team win.

== Statistical leaders ==
=== Top goalscorers ===
Rank	Scorer	Club	Goals
1	(Slovakia) Tomáš Medveď	Lombard FC Pápa	18
2	(Serbia and Montenegro) Igor Bogdanović	Debreceni VSC	15
2	(Hungary) Lóránt Oláh	Kaposvári Rákóczi	15
4	(Hungary) Zsolt Bárányos	MFC Sopron	14
5	(Hungary) Péter Rajczi	Újpest FC	13
6	(Hungary) Zsombor Kerekes	Debreceni VSC	12
7	(Hungary) Gábor Egressy	Diósgyőri VTK	10
7	(Hungary) Tibor Tisza	Diósgyőri VTK	10
7	(North Macedonia) Aleksandar Bajevski	Ferencvárosi TC	10
7	(Hungary) Béla Illés	MTK Budapest FC	10

== Attendances ==
#	Club	Average
1	Debrecen	6,573
2	Diósgyőr	6,100
3	Ferencváros	5,446
4	Zalaegerszeg	4,167
5	Kaposvár	3,447
6	Újpest	3,322
7	Nyíregyháza Spartacus	3,160
8	Sopron	2,988
9	Pécs	2,753
10	Győr	2,653
11	Vasas	2,553
12	Békéscsaba	2,353
13	Lombard Pápa	2,080
14	Budapest Honvéd	2,053
15	MTK	1,521
16	Videoton	1,480
