= Dorge Kouemaha =

Cameroonian footballer

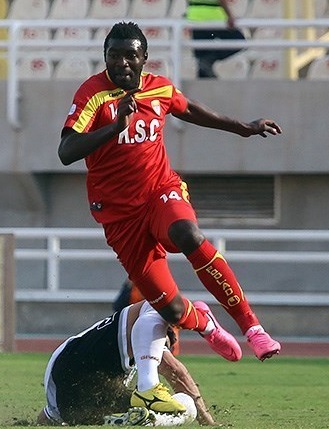
- Dorge Kouemaha playing for Foolad

Personal information
- Full name: Dorge Rostand Kouemaha
- Date of birth: 28 June 1983 (age 43)
- Place of birth: Loum, Cameroon
- Height: 1.84 m (6 ft 0 in)
- Position: Forward

Youth career
- 1997–2000: Lumière de Banka
- 2000–2003: Diap Banja

Senior career*
| Years | Team | Apps | (Gls) |
| 2004 | Victoria United Limbé | 14 | (16) |
| 2005 | Aris | 13 | (0) |
| 2005–2007 | Tatabánya | 33 | (14) |
| 2007–2008 | Debrecen | 27 | (14) |
| 2008–2009 | MSV Duisburg | 34 | (15) |
| 2009–2013 | Club Brugge | 48 | (16) |
| 2011–2012 | → 1. FC Kaiserslautern (loan) | 17 | (2) |
| 2012–2013 | → Eintracht Frankfurt (loan) | 2 | (0) |
| 2013 | → Gaziantepspor (loan) | 15 | (5) |
| 2013–2014 | Adana Demirspor | 31 | (9) |
| 2014–2016 | Lierse | 8 | (2) |
| 2015 | → Denizlispor (loan) | 11 | (2) |
| 2016 | Foolad | 13 | (0) |
| 2017 | Sprimont Comblain | 10 | (6) |
| Total | | 274 | (101) |

International career
| 2008–2012 | Cameroon | 5 | (0) |
- * Club domestic league appearances and goals

Dorge Rostand Kouemaha (born 28 June 1983) is a Cameroonian former professional footballer who played as a forward.

== Career ==
Kouemaha joined Greek side Aris in January 2005 from Victoria United Limbé as actual topscorer of the Cameroonian League. He made his debut for the club in a cup match against Ethnikos Piraeus, scoring the match winner after being brought as a sub in the 59th minute. In August 2005, Kouemaha was transferred to Hungarian side Tatabánya FC. He immediately managed to become a regular scorer for a relatively weak team in the Hungarian league. His 14 league goals for Tatabánya helped him to attract the interest of league leader Debreceni VSC. He finally moved to Debrecen to become their topscorer with 14 league goals in the 2007–08 season.

German 2. Bundesliga outfit MSV Duisburg signed Kouemaha for their 2008–09 campaign. Boosted by his first nomination to the Cameroonian national team, Kouemaha answered the expectations once more by scoring 15 goals in 35 matches. His immediate success in German football led to a €1.2 million move to Belgian club Club Brugge KV for the 2009–10 season. His 16 league goals during that season made him the top goalgetter of the Belgian League. The steady progress in his career broke down with permanent problems with his Achilles tendon in the 2010–11 season which led to a rupture while playing on loan for 1. FC Kaiserslautern in February 2012. Kouemaha celebrated his comeback in the Bundesliga match against Mainz 05 on 27 November 2012 meanwhile playing for Eintracht Frankfurt on loan from Brugge.

In the beginning of 2013, he was loaned to Gaziantepspor having made only two short appearances for Eintracht. After spending two seasons in Turkey, he returned to the Belgian Pro League for Lierse on 16 June 2014, signing a two-year deal.

On 9 January 2016, Kouemaha signed with Iranian club Foolad.
