= 2008–09 Nemzeti Bajnokság I =

Nemzeti Bajnokság I
- Season: 2008–09
- Dates: 25 July 2008 – 30 May 2009
- Champions: Debrecen
- Relegated: Siófok; Rákospalotai EAC
- Champions League: Debrecen
- Europa League: Haladás; Újpest; Budapest Honvéd (via domestic cup)
- Matches: 240
- Goals: 710 (2.96 per match)
- Top goalscorer: Péter Bajzát (20)
- Biggest home win: Győr 6–0 Diósgyőr
- Biggest away win: Zalaegerszeg 2–7 Győr
- Highest scoring: Zalaegerszeg 2–7 Győr
- Longest winning run: Debrecen, Haladás (5 games each)
- Longest unbeaten run: Újpest (21 games)
- Longest winless run: Nyíregyháza (16 games)
- Longest losing run: Honvéd, Rákospalota, Siófok (6 games each)

The 2008–09 Nemzeti Bajnokság I, also known as NB I, was the 107th season of top-tier football in Hungary. The league was officially named Soproni Liga for sponsoring reasons. The season started on 25 July 2008 with Kaposvári Rákóczi FC beating the defending champions MTK Budapest by 3–1. The last games were played on 30 May 2009.

== Promotion and relegation ==
FC Sopron withdrew their participation in the winter break of last year's season after they declared bankruptcy. The team was put into last place and got all points deducted. The remaining relegation spot was earned by FC Tatabánya, who finished the season with a mere 10 points.

Promotion to the league was granted to the champions of the two NB II divisions. Kecskeméti TE won the Eastern Division while the winners of the Western Division were Szombathelyi Haladás.

== Overview ==
Location of teams in Hungarian National Championship I 2008–09

Club	City	Stadium	Capacity
Budapest Honvéd FC	Budapest	Bozsik József Stadion	10,000
Debreceni VSC	Debrecen	Stadion Sóstói	9,640
Diósgyőri VTK	Miskolc	DVTK Stadion	11,200
FC Fehérvár	Székesfehérvár	Stadion Sóstói	15,000
Győri ETO FC	Győr	ETO Park	20,000
Kaposvári Rákóczi FC	Kaposvár	Stadion Rákoczi	7,000
Kecskeméti TE	Kecskemét	Széktói Stadion	6,300
MTK Budapest FC	Budapest	Hidegkuti Nándor Stadium	12,700
Nyíregyháza Spartacus	Nyíregyháza	Városi Stadion	13,501
Paksi SE	Paks	Stadion PSE	4,950
Rákospalotai EAC	Budapest	Stadion Budai II. Laszló	7,500
BFC Siófok	Siófok	Révesz Géza Stadion	12,000
Szombathelyi Haladás	Szombathely	Rohonci úti Stadion	12,500
Újpest FC	Budapest	Szusza Ferenc Stadium	13,501
Vasas SC	Budapest	Stadion Rudolf Illovszky	18,000
Zalaegerszegi TE	Zalaegerszeg	ZTE Arena	14,400

Debreceni VSC won their fourth leaguetitle, and their first under András Herczeg. Újpest and Debrecen were constantly battling for the #1 spot on the table throughout the campaign; Újpest lost only one game in their first 24 matches, and were leading the table four points over Debrecen in October. Újpest held on to their lead through the spring, even handing Debrecen their only defeat in the second half of the season, after a 2–0 defeat at Szusza Ferenc Stadium thanks to goals from Rajczi and Kabát. However, after Matchday 25, Újpest and Debrecen were joint on points due to Újpest's 3–2 defeat at MTK. Újpest went on to lose 4 of their remaining 6 fixtures, while Debrecen ended up winning all but one of their last six matches.

DVSC officially became champions on the 22nd of May, after beating Diósgyőr 3–2 in Miskolc Matchday 29. Újpest on the other hand blew a 3–1 lead at ETO-Park, and conceded an 89' minute goal to have their title hopes blown up, as they lost the game 4–3. One week later, the purple and whites lost their first home game in over a year, after suffering a 1–2 defeat against Fehérvár.

== League table ==
Pos	Team	Pld	W	D	L	GF	GA	GD	Pts	Qualification or relegation
1	Debrecen (C)	30	21	5	4	70	29	+41	68	Qualification for Champions League second qualifying round
2	Újpest	30	17	8	5	61	38	+23	59	Qualification for Europa League second qualifying round
3	Haladás	30	16	5	9	44	29	+15	53	Qualification for Europa League first qualifying round
4	Zalaegerszeg	30	15	7	8	52	44	+8	52	
5	Kecskemét	30	14	6	10	55	44	+11	48	
6	Fehérvár	30	14	6	10	42	34	+8	48	
7	MTK Budapest	30	13	6	11	43	41	+2	45	
8	Győr	30	11	10	9	57	41	+16	43	
9	Kaposvár	30	11	7	12	51	46	+5	40	
10	Vasas	30	11	5	14	42	52	−10	38	
11	Paks	30	9	8	13	38	51	−13	35	
12	Diósgyőr	30	9	6	15	29	45	−16	33	
13	Budapest Honvéd	30	8	8	14	31	46	−15	32	Qualification for Europa League third qualifying round (Note: Budapest Honvéd won the 2008–09 Hungarian Cup and thereby qualified for the third qualifying round of the UEFA Europa League.)
14	Nyíregyháza	30	7	11	12	32	41	−9	32	
15	Siófok (R)	30	8	2	20	30	56	−26	26	Relegation to Nemzeti Bajnokság II
16	Rákospalota (R)	30	3	6	21	33	73	−40	15	Relegation to Nemzeti Bajnokság II

Source: soccerway.com
Rules for classification: 1st points; 2nd overall wins; 3rd goal difference; 4th goals scored
(C) Champions; (R) Relegated

== Results ==
Home \ Away	HON	DEB	DIÓ	FEH	GYŐ	HAL	KAP	KEC	MTK	NYÍ	PAK	RÁK	SIÓ	UTE	VAS	ZTE
Budapest Honvéd		0–1	3–1	1–2	0–0	0–1	2–1	2–2	0–3	1–0	1–1	1–0	0–2	1–1	0–1	3–1
Debrecen	4–1		1–2	1–0	2–2	2–2	4–1	3–1	2–2	4–0	2–0	6–2	5–1	1–1	4–1	2–1
Diósgyőr	0–0	2–3		0–1	2–3	1–0	1–0	1–0	2–3	1–0	1–0	2–1	0–1	0–0	1–0	2–1
Fehérvár	0–2	0–1	2–1		3–2	1–0	1–1	1–2	0–2	2–0	4–1	4–0	2–1	0–0	2–2	1–1
Győr	4–1	0–3	6–0	1–2		3–3	1–1	2–0	3–1	0–1	4–1	4–2	0–0	4–3	1–1	1–0
Haladás	1–0	1–2	1–0	2–1	2–1		1–1	3–1	0–0	3–0	0–1	1–0	5–0	0–2	1–0	1–2
Kaposvár	3–1	0–1	1–0	1–1	0–1	2–3		2–1	3–1	1–0	3–5	4–1	1–0	2–3	4–0	1–2
Kecskemét	3–1	3–0	2–0	2–1	1–0	3–2	3–4		0–0	1–1	1–2	5–3	3–0	2–2	2–0	2–0
MTK Budapest	1–1	0–1	2–0	0–4	1–1	0–1	2–1	1–4		1–2	3–2	0–2	2–1	3–2	3–0	0–2
Nyíregyháza	3–0	1–1	2–2	1–1	1–1	0–2	0–1	3–3	0–0		2–2	4–0	1–0	1–3	3–1	1–1
Paks	1–1	0–2	1–1	0–1	2–1	0–2	0–0	2–2	0–1	1–2		1–3	2–1	3–1	3–0	1–1
Rákospalota	2–5	0–4	1–1	1–2	0–0	1–2	3–3	0–1	0–4	1–1	1–2		3–1	1–3	0–2	2–3
Siófok	0–1	0–4	4–1	1–0	3–2	0–1	2–5	2–0	0–1	3–1	1–2	1–1		0–1	0–1	1–4
Újpest	3–0	2–0	2–2	1–2	1–1	1–0	3–2	4–3	4–1	1–0	3–1	3–0	2–0		3–1	2–1
Vasas	3–1	1–3	3–2	4–1	2–1	1–1	2–1	1–2	0–4	1–1	5–0	1–1	0–1	4–2		3–1
Zalaegerszeg	1–1	2–1	1–0	2–0	2–7	3–2	1–1	1–0	3–1	2–0	1–1	2–1	5–3	2–2	3–1	

Source: soccerway.com
Legend: Blue = home team win; Yellow = draw; Red = away team win.

== Top goalscorers ==
Source: adatbank.mlsz.hu (in Hungarian) – Note: Click on "Góllövő lista" to retrieve the scorers

Rank	Scorer	Club	Goals
1	(Hungary) Péter Bajzát	Győri ETO	20
2	(Hungary) Péter Kabát	Újpest FC	16
2	(Serbia) Nemanja Nikolić	Kaposvári Rákóczi	16
2	(Hungary) Gergely Rudolf	Debreceni VSC	16
2	(Hungary) Attila Tököli	Paksi SE	16
6	(Hungary) Róbert Waltner	Zalaegerszegi TE	15
7	(Hungary) Csaba Csordás	Kecskeméti TE	14
7	(Hungary) Zoltán Hercegfalvi	Budapest Honvéd	14
7	(Hungary) Krisztián Kenesei	Szombathelyi Haladás	14
10	(Hungary) Lóránt Oláh	Debreceni VSC	12

== Attendances ==
#	Club	Average
1	Szombathelyi Haladás	6,167
2	Újpest	5,251
3	Debrecen	4,967
4	Zalaegerszeg	3,999
5	Kecskemét	3,813
6	Diósgyőr	3,400
7	Győr	3,147
8	Nyíregyháza Spartacus	3,133
9	Kaposvár	2,337
10	Paks	2,319
11	Vasas	2,040
12	Videoton	1,882
13	Budapest Honvéd	1,747
14	Siófok	1,383
15	MTK	930
16	Rákospalota	733
