= 2007–08 Nemzeti Bajnokság I =

Nemzeti Bajnokság I
- Season: 2007–08
- Dates: 20 July 2007 – 2 June 2008
- Champions: MTK Budapest
- Relegated: Tatabánya; Sopron
- Champions League: MTK Budapest
- UEFA Cup: Debrecen; Győr
- Intertoto Cup: Budapest Honvéd
- Matches: 240
- Goals: 740 (3.08 per match)
- Top goalscorer: Róbert Waltner (18)
- Biggest home win: Fehérvár 7–0 Tatabánya
- Biggest away win: Tatabánya 2–6 Kaposvár
- Highest scoring: REAC 5–5 Diósgyőr

The 2007–08 Nemzeti Bajnokság I, also known as NB I, was the 106th season of top-tier football in Hungary. The league was officially named Soproni Liga for sponsoring reasons. The season started on 20 July 2007 and ended on 2 June 2008.

The league was contested by 16 teams and MTK Budapest emerged victorious, breaking DVSC's hegemony in the league. The two teams were in a two-way title race for much of the season, with the fate of the championship being decided on the penultimate day of the season, after MTK beat REAC 1–4 in Zugló. Debrecen finished 2nd, two points off the trophy. Despite failing to retain their championship, Debrecen still had a memorable season, only losing at home to champions MTK, and winning eight of their last nine games. MTK remained undefeated until October, as DVSC suffered losses early on to Honvéd and MTK. MTK would only lose two games on home soil under József Garami, and won six of their last seven games. The two teams scored an equal number of goals, 67.

As of 2024, this remains MTK's most recent league title.

== League standings ==
Pos	Team	Pld	W	D	L	GF	GA	GD	Pts	Qualification or relegation
1	MTK (C)	30	20	6	4	67	23	+44	66	Qualification for Champions League second qualifying round
2	Debrecen	30	19	7	4	67	29	+38	64	Qualification for UEFA Cup first qualifying round
3	Győr	30	16	10	4	64	35	+29	58	Qualification for UEFA Cup first qualifying round
4	Újpest	30	16	7	7	58	40	+18	55	
5	Fehérvár	30	17	3	10	48	32	+16	54	
6	Kaposvár	30	14	9	7	48	38	+10	51	
7	Zalaegerszeg	30	13	7	10	55	39	+16	46	
8	Honvéd	30	12	7	11	45	36	+9	43	Qualification for Intertoto Cup first round
9	Vasas	30	12	5	13	41	45	−4	41	
10	Nyíregyháza	30	11	7	12	34	37	−3	40	
11	Paks	30	9	10	11	51	51	0	37	
12	Rákospalota	30	7	9	14	42	60	−18	30	
13	Diósgyőr	30	5	13	12	43	63	−20	28	
14	Siófok	30	6	9	15	33	46	−13	27	
15	Tatabánya (R)	30	2	4	24	34	93	−59	10	Relegation to Nemzeti Bajnokság II
16	Sopron (Note: FC Sopron couldn't finish the 2007–08 season, because of bankruptcy. All remaining matches will be counted as won for their opponents.) (D)	30	2	5	23	10	73	−63	0	Exclution and Dissolution

Source: soccerway.com
(C) Champions; (D) Disqualified; (R) Relegated

== Results ==
Home \ Away	HON	DEB	DIÓ	FEH	GYŐ	KAP	MTK	NYÍ	PAK	RÁK	SIÓ	SOP	TAT	UTE	VAS	ZTE
Budapest Honvéd		3–1	0–1	5–1	2–2	0–1	0–2	0–0	2–1	1–1	1–1	3–0	4–1	1–4	0–1	2–1
Debrecen	1–0		3–0	3–0	2–0	4–0	0–2	4–1	1–1	4–0	2–0	4–2	4–1	3–1	2–0	3–2
Diósgyőr	2–2	1–2		2–0	1–3	2–1	2–2	0–0	3–3	0–1	0–3	3–0	2–2	1–4	4–5	1–1
Fehérvár	0–0	0–0	3–1		1–0	1–1	1–0	2–1	3–0	2–1	1–0	2–0	7–0	1–2	5–2	2–0
Győr	2–2	3–1	5–1	4–1		1–1	1–0	5–0	3–3	2–1	4–1	1–1	2–1	4–2	2–1	3–2
Kaposvár	1–0	2–2	1–1	1–0	1–1		0–3	1–1	2–1	3–0	4–3	1–1	4–2	0–3	1–0	0–2
MTK Budapest	1–2	3–2	1–1	2–0	2–2	3–2		2–0	1–1	3–0	3–0	3–0	5–1	0–0	0–2	4–1
Nyíregyháza	3–0	1–1	2–1	0–1	1–0	0–2	0–2		1–2	2–0	2–0	3–0	5–0	1–2	2–1	2–1
Paks	0–3	2–2	2–2	2–1	2–1	1–1	1–4	3–0		0–2	1–1	3–0	6–0	2–0	3–0	0–3
Rákospalota	0–3	0–4	5–5	0–2	2–2	1–1	0–3	2–2	2–1		4–2	3–0	3–2	1–1	2–0	1–2
Siófok	1–2	1–1	4–0	1–0	0–1	0–2	1–1	0–1	1–1	1–0		3–0	3–0	2–4	1–3	1–1
Sopron	0–1	0–3	0–1	0–3	0–3	0–3	1–5	1–1	1–1	2–1	0–0		0–3	0–3	0–3	0–3
Tatabánya	4–3	1–2	2–2	1–3	1–3	2–6	1–3	0–1	2–4	1–1	2–2	0–1		2–3	0–2	0–2
Újpest	1–0	1–1	2–2	1–0	1–3	0–2	1–3	1–0	3–1	4–4	3–0	4–0	3–0		1–1	1–1
Vasas	0–2	0–3	0–0	1–2	1–1	1–2	0–3	3–1	3–2	2–1	0–0	2–0	3–1	0–1		1–0
Zalaegerszeg	2–1	1–2	4–1	1–3	0–0	2–1	0–1	0–0	3–1	3–3	2–0	4–0	4–1	4–1	3–3	

Source: soccerway.com
Legend: Blue = home team win; Yellow = draw; Red = away team win.

== Statistics ==
=== Top goalscorers ===
Rank	Scorer	Club	Goals
1	(Hungary) Róbert Waltner	Zalaegerszegi TE	18
2	(Hungary) Gábor Urbán	MTK Budapest FC	17
3	(Hungary) Lóránt Oláh	Kaposvári Rákóczi	16
4	(Hungary) Tibor Tisza	Újpest FC	15
4	(Hungary) Attila Tököli	Paksi FC	15
6	(Hungary) Attila Simon	Diósgyőri VTK	14
7	(Cameroon) Dorge Kouemaha	Debreceni VSC	13
7	(Hungary) Péter Bajzát	Győri ETO FC	13
9	(Hungary) József Kanta	MTK Budapest FC	12
9	(Hungary) Norbert Németh	Vasas SC	12

== Attendances ==
#	Club	Average attendance
1	Debrecen	5,633
2	Zalaegerszeg	4,667
3	Diósgyőr	4,536
4	Nyíregyháza Spartacus	4,214
5	Újpest	4,026
6	Győr	3,827
7	Kaposvár	2,967
8	Sopron	2,343
9	Budapest Honvéd	2,237
10	Siófok	2,214
11	Vasas	2,007
12	Videoton	1,980
13	Paks	1,880
14	MTK	1,536
15	Rákospalota	1,193
16	Tatabánya	810
