= 1998–99 BVSC Budapest season =

BVSC Budapest
1998–99 season
- Chairman: (Hungary) József Ádám (until 25 January 1999) (Hungary) Mihály Hipszki
- Manager: (Hungary) (Russia) István Sándor (until 3 January 1999) (Federal Republic of Yugoslavia) Dragan Sekulić (until 10 February 1999) (Hungary) József Tajti
- PNB: 17.
- Hungarian Cup: Round of 32
- Top goalscorer: League: (Hungary) Lajos Détári (8); All: (Hungary) Lajos Détári (8)
- Highest home attendance: 6,000 v Újpest (1 August 1998)
- Lowest home attendance: 250 v Gázszer (29 May 1999)
Home colours	Away colours	Third colours

== First team squad ==
Note: Flags indicate national team as defined under FIFA eligibility rules; some limited exceptions apply. Players may hold more than one non-FIFA nationality.

No.	Pos.	Nation	Player
—	FW	ROU	Catalin Anghel
—	FW	HUN	Zsolt Aubel
—	MF	YUG	Đorđe Bajić
—	DF	HUN	Zoltán Balog
—	MF	HUN	Balázs Bérczy
—	DF	UKR	Oleksandr Bondarenko
—	FW	HUN	Levente Bozsik
—	MF	UKR	Viktor Brovchenko
—	MF	HUN	Krisztián Csillag
—	MF	HUN	Lajos Détári
—	MF	HUN	Attila Forrai
—	FW	HUN	Zsolt Füzesi
—	MF	HUN	Krisztián Füzi
—	DF	HUN	Csaba Gelbmann
—	DF	HUN	János Kertész
—	FW	HUN	István Kiss

No.	Pos.	Nation	Player
—	GK	HUN	János Koszta
—	DF	HUN	Csaba László
—	DF	HUN	Zoltán Molnár
—	GK	HUN	Gábor Nagy
—	MF	HUN	Attila Polonkai
—	DF	HUN	Tibor Pomper
—	FW	HUN	Károly Potemkin
—	DF	UKR	Myroslav Reshko
—	MF	HUN	Dénes Rósa
—	GK	HUN	Ferenc Rott
—	DF	HUN	Csaba Szakos
—	DF	HUN	Ferenc Szaszovszky
—	FW	HUN	Szabolcs Szegletes
—	FW	HUN	Gábor Szilágyi
—	MF	ROU	Daniel Usvat
—	DF	HUN	Zoltán Vincze

== Transfers ==
=== Summer ===
In: Note: Flags indicate national team as defined under FIFA eligibility rules; some limited exceptions apply. Players may hold more than one non-FIFA nationality.

No.	Pos.	Nation	Player
—	MF	YUG	Đorđe Bajić (from (Federal Republic of Yugoslavia) FK Radnički Niš)
—	MF	UKR	Viktor Brovchenko (from (Ukraine) PFC Nyva Vinnytsia)
—	FW	HUN	Zsolt Füzesi (from Stadler FC)
—	DF	HUN	János Kertész (from Stadler FC)
—	DF	HUN	Zoltán Molnár (from Stadler FC)
—	GK	HUN	Gábor Nagy (from Stadler FC)
—	MF	HUN	Attila Polonkai (loan return from Szeged LC)
—	DF	HUN	Tibor Pomper (loan return from Ferencvárosi TC)
—	DF	UKR	Myroslav Reshko (from Stadler FC)
—	DF	HUN	Csaba Szakos (from Miskolci VSE)
—	DF	HUN	Ferenc Szaszovszky (from Pécsi MFC)
—	FW	HUN	Szabolcs Szegletes (from Veszprémi LC)
—	DF	HUN	Zoltán Vincze (from Stadler FC)

Out: Note: Flags indicate national team as defined under FIFA eligibility rules; some limited exceptions apply. Players may hold more than one non-FIFA nationality.

No.	Pos.	Nation	Player
—	MF	HUN	Zoltán Bükszegi (to Ferencvárosi TC)
—	MF	HUN	Ákos Csiszár (to Győri ETO FC)
—	FW	HUN	Csaba Csordás (to MTK Budapest FC)
—	MF	HUN	Károly Erős (to MTK Budapest FC)
—	GK	HUN	Balázs Farkas (loan to Marcali VSE)
—	DF	HUN	József Farkas (to Kiskunfélegyházi TK)
—	DF	HUN	Péter Forgács (to Salgótarjáni BTC)
—	MF	HUN	Ákos Füzi (to Ferencvárosi TC)
—	DF	HUN	Ádám Komlósi (to MTK Budapest FC)
—	DF	HUN	Csaba Magyari (to Soproni VSE)
—	MF	HUN	Dénes Rósa (to Győri ETO FC)
—	DF	HUN	Balázs Sinkó (to Szolnoki MÁV FC)
—	MF	HUN	Imre Szín (to Tiszakécskei FC)
—	GK	HUN	Zoltán Varga (to Tiszakécskei FC)
—	MF	HUN	János Zováth (to Tiszakécskei FC)

=== Winter ===
In: Note: Flags indicate national team as defined under FIFA eligibility rules; some limited exceptions apply. Players may hold more than one non-FIFA nationality.

No.	Pos.	Nation	Player
—	DF	HUN	Zoltán Balog (from (Belgium) Royal Antwerp F.C.)
—	MF	HUN	Balázs Bérczy (from Újpest FC)
—	MF	HUN	Lajos Détári (from (Austria) SKN St. Pölten)
—	MF	HUN	Attila Forrai (from Gázszer FC)
—	MF	HUN	Dénes Rósa (from Győri ETO FC)
—	FW	HUN	Károly Potemkin (loan return from Ferencvárosi TC)
—	GK	HUN	Ferenc Rott (from Budapest Honvéd FC)

Out: Note: Flags indicate national team as defined under FIFA eligibility rules; some limited exceptions apply. Players may hold more than one non-FIFA nationality.

No.	Pos.	Nation	Player
—	MF	UKR	Viktor Brovchenko (to (Russia) FC Torpedo-2 Moscow)
—	DF	HUN	János Kertész (to Kiskőrösi FC)
—	FW	HUN	István Kiss (to Videoton FC)
—	DF	HUN	Csaba László (to Videoton FC)
—	DF	HUN	Zoltán Molnár (to Kiskőrösi FC)
—	MF	HUN	László Tóth (to Soroksári TE)

== Pre-season ==
27 June 1998	Vácrátóti KSE	0 – 19	BVSC Budapest	Vácrátót
			Bozsik x5 Kiss x4 Anghel x4 Szegletes x2 Pelles x2 Kertész; Szaszovszky

1 July 1998	BVSC Budapest	10 – 0	Csepel SC	Budapest, Stadion Szőnyi út
	Csordás x2 Kiss x2 Aubel; Szegletes; Bajić; Usvat; Bondarenko; Szako

4 July 1998	BVSC Budapest	3 – 0	Szolnoki MÁV FC	Budapest, Stadion Szőnyi út
	Anghel; Füzi; Bozsik

8 July 1998	MTK Budapest FC	4 – 0	BVSC Budapest	Budapest, Hidegkuti Nándor Stadium
	Orosz; Preisinger; Halmai; Kenesei

11 July 1998	BVSC Budapest	1 – 2	FC Farul Constanţa (Romania)	Budapest, Stadion Szőnyi út
	Füzi (pen.)

14 July 1998	BVSC Budapest	8 – 0	Izsák FC	Budapest, Stadion Szőnyi út
	Pomper x3 Bozsik x3 Csillag; Kiss

16 July 1998	Kaposvári Rákóczi FC	1 – 0	BVSC Budapest	Kaposvár, Stadion Kaposvár Rákóczi

24 July 1998	BVSC Budapest	2 – 1	Edessaikos F.C. (Greece)	Budapest, Stadion Szőnyi út
	Csillag; Brovchenko

== Professzionális Nemzeti Bajnokság ==
=== League table ===
Pos	Team	Pld	W	D	L	GF	GA	GD	Pts	Qualification or relegation
14	Haladás	34	10	6	18	39	54	−15	36	
15	Siófok	34	7	9	18	32	49	−17	30	
16	Videoton (R)	34	7	9	18	36	54	−18	30	Relegation to Nemzeti Bajnokság II
17	BVSC (R)	34	7	6	21	34	53	−19	27	Relegation to Nemzeti Bajnokság II
18	III. Kerület (R)	34	4	6	24	40	93	−53	18	Relegation to Nemzeti Bajnokság II

Source: soccerway.com
Rules for classification: 1st points; 2nd goal difference; 3rd goals scored; 4th overall wins.
(R) Relegated

=== Results summary ===
Overall								Home						Away					
Pld	W	D	L	GF	GA	GD	Pts	W	D	L	GF	GA	GD	W	D	L	GF	GA	GD
34	7	6	21	34	53	−19	27	5	2	10	17	24	−7	2	4	11	17	29	−12

Last updated: 16 June 1999.
Source: PNB
