= 1996–97 Vác FC season =

Vác
1996–97 season
- Manager: Dénes Tóth (until 5 September 1996); László Strausz (from 5 September)
- Stadium: Ligeti Stadion
- Nemzeti Bajnokság I: 11th
- Magyar Kupa: Semi-finals
- Highest home attendance: 9,000 v Ferencváros (22 March 1997, Nemzeti Bajnokság I)
- Lowest home attendance: 400 v Tiszavasvári (20 November 1996, Magyar Kupa)
- Average home league attendance: 2,294
- Biggest win: 5–0 v Pécs (Home, 7 September 1996, Nemzeti Bajnokság I)
- Biggest defeat: 2–6 v Videoton (Away, 16 August 1996, Nemzeti Bajnokság I); 0–4 v MTK (Away, 8 April 1997, Magyar Kupa)

The 1996–97 season was Vác Football Club's 10th competitive season, their 10th consecutive season in the Nemzeti Bajnokság I and 84th season in existence as a football club. In addition to the domestic league, Vác participated in the Magyar Kupa.

== Squad ==
Players with league appearances

Note: Flags indicate national team as defined under FIFA eligibility rules; some limited exceptions apply. Players may hold more than one non-FIFA nationality.

No.	Pos.	Nation	Player
—	FW	ROU	Alexandru Andrași
—	DF	HUN	Ádám Babos
—	MF	HUN	Zoltán Bánföldi
—	DF	HUN	József Boda
—	FW	HUN	István Borgulya
—	FW	HUN	Antal Füle
—	FW	HUN	Zoltán Győri
—	GK	HUN	Sándor Halász
—	GK	HUN	István Hámori
—	FW	HUN	Csaba Hetesi
—	FW	HUN	Péter Horváth
—	DF	HUN	István Kasza
—	DF	HUN	Péter Kovács
—	MF	HUN	Gábor Kriska
—	DF	HUN	János Lajkovics

No.	Pos.	Nation	Player
—	DF	HUN	András Lévai
—	DF	HUN	Tibor Nagy
—	MF	HUN	József Nyikos
—	FW	HUN	László Répási
—	FW	HUN	Kornél Rob
—	MF	HUN	Tamás Sándor
—	MF	HUN	Zoltán Schwarcz
—	MF	HUN	István Sipeki
—	DF	HUN	László Strasser
—	MF	HUN	Imre Szoboszlai
—	GK	HUN	Iván Tóth
—	DF	HUN	Csaba Vámosi
—	MF	HUN	Sándor Veres
—	MF	HUN	Péter Víg
—	MF	HUN	Csaba Vojtekovszki

== Competitions ==
=== Overview ===
Competition	First match	Last match	Starting round	Final position	Record							
Competition	First match	Last match	Starting round	Final position	Pld	W	D	L	GF	GA	GD	Win %
Nemzeti Bajnokság I	12 August 1996	28 May 1997	Matchday 1	11th	34	10	10	14	40	48	−8	29.41
Magyar Kupa	31 July 1996	23 April 1997	Group stage	Semi-finals	11	7	3	1	25	15	+10	63.64
Total					45	17	13	15	65	63	+2	37.78

Source: Competitions

=== Nemzeti Bajnokság I ===
==== League table ====
Pos	Team	Pld	W	D	L	GF	GA	GD	Pts
9	Győr	34	10	12	12	44	51	−7	42
10	Haladás	34	10	10	14	39	42	−3	40
11	Vác	34	10	10	14	40	48	−8	40
12	Siófok	34	10	10	14	36	53	−17	40
13	Zalaegerszeg	34	11	7	16	34	51	−17	40

Source: rsssf.com

==== Results summary ====
Overall								Home						Away					
Pld	W	D	L	GF	GA	GD	Pts	W	D	L	GF	GA	GD	W	D	L	GF	GA	GD
34	10	10	14	40	48	−8	40	7	4	6	26	20	+6	3	6	8	14	28	−14

Source: Matches

==== Matches ====
12 August 1996 1	Vác	0–1	Haladás	Vác
19:00 CEST (UTC+2)	Kasza (yellow card) 28'; Lajkovics (red card) 52'	Report	Usvat (yellow card) 28'; Fehér 65', (yellow card) 75'; Szekér (yellow card) 81' (yellow-red card) 85'	Stadium: Ligeti Stadion; Attendance: 2,000; Referee: Sándor Piller; Assistant referees: Hanyecz, Hrabovszky

16 August 1996 2	Videoton	6–2	Vác	Székesfehérvár
19:00 CEST (UTC+2)	L. Takács 20', 46', 56'; Korsós 37'; T. Pető 49', 53'; A. Tóth (yellow card) 89'	Report	Szoboszlai (yellow card) 41'; Borgulya (yellow card) 42'; Répási 59'; Vámosi (yellow card) 62'; Ti. Nagy 89'	Stadium: Sóstói Stadion; Attendance: 6,000; Referee: Attila Hanacsek; Assistant referees: A. Szabó, O. Horváth

24 August 1996 3	Vác	0–1	Vasas	Vác
19:00 CEST (UTC+2)	Vámosi (yellow card) 7'; Ti. Nagy (yellow card) 28'; Kasza (yellow card) 44'	Report	Juhár 10'; Simon (yellow card) 40'	Stadium: Ligeti Stadion; Attendance: 2,000; Referee: Sándor Puhl; Assistant referees: Hamar, Dr. Bozóky

4 September 1996 4	Ferencváros	3–1	Vác	Budapest
19:00 CEST (UTC+2)	Zavadszky 7'; Arany (yellow card) 9'; F. Horváth 25', 39'	Report	Andrași 42'	Stadium: Üllői úti Stadion; Attendance: 10,000; Referee: László Molnár; Assistant referees: Mező, O. Horváth

7 September 1996 5	Vác	5–0	Pécs	Vác
19:00 CEST (UTC+2)	Andrași (yellow card) 2', (goal) 39'; Kasza 12'; P. Horváth 42'; Répási 53'; Schwarcz (yellow card) 55', (goal) 70'	Report		Stadium: Ligeti Stadion; Attendance: 1,000; Referee: Zsolt Szabó; Assistant referees: B. Kiss, Hidasi

14 September 1996 6	Újpest	3–1	Vác	Budapest
19:00 CEST (UTC+2)	Z. Kovács 14'; Zombori 64'; Babati 72'; Jenei (yellow card) 87'	Report	Vámosi (yellow card) 30'; P. Kovács (yellow card) 71'; P. Horváth 84'	Stadium: Megyeri úti stadion Attendance: 6,000; Referee: Sándor Márton; Assistant referees: Ábrahám, Vavika

18 September 1996 7	Vác	0–2	Debrecen	Vác
18:00 CEST (UTC+2)	P. Kovács (yellow card) 78'; Rob (yellow card) 87'	Report	Ilea (yellow card) 49'; Z. Pető (yellow card) 51'; Vadicska (yellow card) 53'; T. Sándor I 66', 90+1'	Stadium: Ligeti Stadion; Attendance: 2,500; Referee: Tibor Kincses; Assistant referees: Arany, Mező

23 September 1996 8	Győr	0–0	Vác	Győr
19:00 CEST (UTC+2)	Lakos (yellow card) 79'	Report	Boda (yellow card) 48'; Lajkovics (yellow card) 72'	Stadium: Stadion ETO; Attendance: 800; Referee: Vencel Tóth; Assistant referees: A. Szabó, Bajkai

28 September 1996 9	Vác	3–2	III. Kerület	Vác
19:00 CEST (UTC+2)	Schwarcz (yellow card) 28'; Kriska 64'; P. Horváth 77'; Vojtekovszki 88'	Report	Szamosi (yellow card) 26'; Perger (yellow card) 68'; Szeitl 71'; Lendvai 89'	Stadium: Ligeti Stadion; Attendance: 1,500; Referee: László Molnár; Assistant referees: B. Kiss, L. Varga

12 October 1996 10	Zalaegerszeg	1–0	Vác	Zalaegerszeg
17:00 CEST (UTC+2)	J. Sebők 46'; B. Molnár (yellow card) 51'; A. Nagy (yellow card) 85'	Report	Boda (yellow card) 1'; Vojtekovszki (yellow card) 29'; Nyikos (red card) 51'	Stadium: ZTE Stadion; Attendance: 5,000; Referee: Sándor Puhl; Assistant referees: Márton, B. Szabó

19 October 1996 11	Vác	2–2	Siófok	Vác
14:30 CEST (UTC+2)	P. Horváth 7'; Vámosi (yellow card) 32'; Andrași 54'	Report	T. Koltai I (yellow card) 19'; Gersics (yellow card) 45'; Kriston (yellow card) 48'; Bulatović 63'; Z. Takács 89'; Filipović (yellow card) 90'	Stadium: Ligeti Stadion; Attendance: 1,000; Referee: Attila Hajdó; Assistant referees: Kurmai, Bukovics

26 October 1996 12	Kispest-Honvéd	1–1	Vác	Budapest
17:00 CEST (UTC+2)	Mih. Tóth 12'; Tarlue (yellow card) 22'; Hahn (yellow card) 65'	Report	Schwarcz (yellow card) 10'; Kriska 48'	Stadium: Bozsik József Stadion; Attendance: 1,500; Referee: Sándor Márton; Assistant referees: Hamar, Dr. Bozóky

2 November 1996 13	Vác	1–4	MTK	Vác
15:00 CET (UTC+1)	Boda (yellow card) 29'; Vámosi 38'; Vojtekovszki (yellow card) 53' (yellow-red card) 79'; P. Kovács (yellow card) 61'	Report	Illés 27', 54' (pen.); Talapa (yellow card) 32'; Csertői 60', 80'	Stadium: Ligeti Stadion; Attendance: 3,000; Referee: Béla Kiss; Assistant referees: Bede, Kaibás

13 November 1996 14	Vác	2–0	Békéscsaba	Vác
17:00 CET (UTC+1)	Andrași 38'; Boda (yellow card) 48'; Schwarcz (yellow card) 53'; Vámosi 64'	Report	Kulcsár (yellow card) 26'; Szabados (yellow card) 43'; Todorović (yellow card) 81'	Stadium: Ligeti Stadion; Attendance: 2,000; Referee: József Bukovics; Assistant referees: L. Molnár, Kincses

16 November 1996 15	Csepel	1–1	Vác	Budapest
13:00 CET (UTC+1)	Tyukodi (red card) 13'; Ta. Nagy (yellow card) 28'; Jakab 62'; Petrók (yellow card) 74'	Report	Andrași (yellow card) 13', (goal) 26'; P. Horváth (yellow card) 41'	Stadium: Béke téri Stadion; Attendance: 1,000; Referee: László Vágner; Assistant referees: Hanacsek, Ring

23 November 1996 16	Vác	2–0	Stadler	Vác
15:00 CET (UTC+1)	Borgulya 15'; Vámosi 87'	Report	Mikóczi (yellow card) 55'; Kertész (yellow card) 59'	Stadium: Ligeti Stadion; Attendance: 1,500; Referee: Lajos Mohácsi; Assistant referees: Marcsok, L. Varga

30 November 1996 17	BVSC	0–1	Vác	Budapest
17:00 CET (UTC+1)	Dragóner (yellow card) 38'; Stănici (yellow card) 84'	Report	Boda (yellow card) 36'; Ti. Nagy 53' (pen.)	Stadium: Szőnyi úti Stadion; Attendance: 200; Referee: Géza Kiss; Assistant referees: Cserna, Hanyecz

1 March 1997 18	Haladás	1–1	Vác	Szombathely
17:00 CET (UTC+1)	Fehér (yellow card) 52'; K. Varga (yellow card) 63'; Baumgartner (yellow card) 72'; Bonchiş (yellow card) 83'; Mik. Tóth 90'	Report	P. Horváth (yellow card) 17', (goal) 21'; Füle (yellow card) 43'; Lévai (yellow card) 58'	Stadium: Rohonci út Attendance: 7,000; Referee: Attila Hanacsek; Assistant referees: L. Molnár, O. Horváth

8 March 1997 19	Vác	1–0	Videoton	Vác
14:30 CET (UTC+1)	P. Horváth 29'; Kriska (yellow card) 45' (yellow-red card) 84'; Babos (yellow card) 60'; Boda (red card) 66'	Report	Korsós (yellow card) 39'; Bekő (yellow card) 42' (red card) 42'	Stadium: Ligeti Stadion; Attendance: 3,000; Referee: Ferenc Lettrich; Assistant referees: Z. Szabó, L. Varga

15 March 1997 20	Vasas	0–0	Vác	Budapest
19:00 CET (UTC+1)		Report	Kasza (yellow card) 80'	Stadium: Fáy utcai Stadion; Attendance: 4,000; Referee: Vencel Tóth; Assistant referees: G. Kiss, Márton

22 March 1997 21	Vác	1–1	Ferencváros	Vác
19:00 CET (UTC+1)	Strasser (yellow card) 38'; Andrași 63'; T. Sándor II (yellow card) 65'	Report	Nyikos 18' (o.g.); Vincze (yellow card) 90'	Stadium: Ligeti Stadion; Attendance: 9,000; Referee: Sándor Piller; Assistant referees: Kincses, Mohácsi

26 March 1997 22	Pécs	2–0	Vác	Pécs
15:00 CET (UTC+1)	Szabados (yellow card) 31'; Brindas 61'; Kislőrincz (yellow card) 67'; Azoiței 89'	Report	Füle (yellow card) 40'; Babos (yellow card) 52'	Stadium: Stadion PMFC; Attendance: 2,000; Referee: István Vad; Assistant referees: Z. Szabó, Kaibás

29 March 1997 23	Vác	0–1	Újpest	Vác
19:00 CET (UTC+1)	Kriska (yellow card) 33'; Strasser (yellow card) 38'; Borgulya (yellow card) 58'; Ti. Nagy (yellow card) 87'	Report	Herczeg 41', (yellow card) 71'; Bérczy (yellow card) 48'; V. Sebők (yellow card) 76'	Stadium: Ligeti Stadion; Attendance: 3,000; Referee: László Cserna; Assistant referees: Bukovics, J. Szabó

5 April 1997 24	Debrecen	1–2	Vác	Debrecen
15:00 CEST (UTC+2)	Z. Pető (yellow card) 49'; T. Sándor I 62'; Szatmári (yellow card) 73'	Report	P. Horváth 43'; Füle 70'	Stadium: Oláh Gábor utcai Stadion; Attendance: 6,000; Referee: Attila Hajdó; Assistant referees: Hanyecz, Z. Szabó

12 April 1997 25	Vác	3–1	Győr	Vác
19:00 CEST (UTC+2)	P. Horváth 5'; Füle 7'; Boda (yellow card) 32'; Lévai 41', (yellow card) 79'	Report	Csató 53'	Stadium: Ligeti Stadion; Attendance: 1,500; Referee: Sándor Puhl; Assistant referees: Mező, Makai

16 April 1997 26	III. Kerület	1–2	Vác	Budapest
17:00 CEST (UTC+2)	Aubel 12'; L. Varga (yellow card) 15'; Páling (yellow card) 31'; Novák (yellow card) 44'; Perger (yellow card) 53'	Report	Lévai (yellow card) 21'; Füle 40'; Borgulya (yellow card) 47'; Boda (yellow card) 52'; Kasza 84'	Stadium: Hévízi úti Stadion; Attendance: 1,000; Referee: Tibor Kincses; Assistant referees: G. Kiss, Mohácsi

19 April 1997 27	Vác	1–1	Zalaegerszeg	Vác
19:00 CEST (UTC+2)	Vojtekovszki 64'	Report	Gaál 7'; A. Nagy (yellow card) 13' (yellow-red card) 60'	Stadium: Ligeti Stadion; Attendance: 1,500; Referee: Sándor Piller; Assistant referees: Koch, Székely

3 May 1997 28	Siófok	0–0	Vác	Siófok
19:00 CEST (UTC+2)	Filipović (yellow card) 23'; Sallai (yellow card) 57'	Report	Kasza (yellow card) 37'; Lévai (yellow card) 40'	Stadium: Révész Géza utcai Stadion; Attendance: 3,000; Referee: Zsolt Szabó; Assistant referees: Sóthy, Tamássy

7 May 1997 29	Vác	2–0	Kispest-Honvéd	Vác
19:00 CEST (UTC+2)	Kasza 14'; Kriska (yellow card) 57'; Nyikos 75'; Babos (yellow card) 83'	Report	Tarlue (yellow card) 31'; Farkas (yellow card) 58'; M. Plókai (yellow card) 69'	Stadium: Ligeti Stadion; Attendance: 2,000; Referee: István Vad; Assistant referees: G. Kiss, Kincses

11 May 1997 30	MTK	3–0	Vác	Budapest
14:30 CEST (UTC+2)	Halmai 29'; Lőrincz (yellow card) 48'; Illés 55'; Zsivóczky 74'	Report	Boda (yellow card) 69'	Stadium: Hungária körúti Stadion; Attendance: 2,000; Referee: Ferenc Bede; Assistant referees: Kormai, Mező

14 May 1997 31	Békéscsaba	3–2	Vác	Békéscsaba
17:00 CEST (UTC+2)	Todorović 15' (pen.), 68'; Balog (yellow card) 39'; Belvon 46'	Report	Lévai (yellow card) 15' (yellow-red card) 22'; Füle 31'; Nyikos 57'	Stadium: Kórház utcai Stadion; Attendance: 3,000; Referee: Vencel Tóth; Assistant referees: Dr. Bozóky, Ring

17 May 1997 32	Vác	3–3	Csepel	Vác
17:00 CEST (UTC+2)	P. Horváth 8'; Füle 60'; Vojtekovszki 62'	Report	Bubcsó 35'; H. Rósa 54' (pen.); Jakab 58'; N. Tóth (yellow card) 62'; Mészáros (yellow card) 66'; Baranyi (yellow card) 73'; Bíró (yellow card) 89'	Stadium: Ligeti Stadion; Attendance: 1,500; Referee: László Molnár; Assistant referees: Hajdó, Nyilas

24 May 1997 33	Stadler	2–0	Vác	Akasztó
17:00 CEST (UTC+2)	Ti. Nagy 28' (o.g.); Z. Molnár I (yellow card) 60'; Reshko (yellow card) 75'; S. Nagy 86'	Report	Boda (yellow card) 22' (yellow-red card) 39'; Nyikos (yellow card) 43'; Szoboszlai (red card) 72'; Vojtekovszki (yellow card) 80'	Stadium: Stadler Stadion; Attendance: 1,000; Referee: Attila Hanacsek; Assistant referees: Koch, A. Szabó

28 May 1997 34	Vác	0–1	BVSC	Vác
17:00 CEST (UTC+2)	Schwarcz (yellow card) 22'; Nyikos (yellow card) 28'; P. Kovács (yellow card) 69'	Report	Bükszegi 25'; D. Rósa (yellow card) 39'	Stadium: Ligeti Stadion; Attendance: 1,000; Referee: Zsolt Szabó; Assistant referees: Mohácsi, Tompos

=== Magyar Kupa ===
==== Group stage ====
Pos	Team	Pld	W	D	L	GF	GA	GD	Pts	Qualification	VAC	PAL	RAK	FEL
1	Vác	3	2	1	0	7	1	+6	7	Advance to knockout phase	—			
2	Pálháza	3	1	1	1	5	5	0	4	Advance to knockout phase	1–1	—	2–3	2–1
3	Rákospalota	3	1	0	2	3	5	−2	3		0–2		—	
4	Felsőtárkány	3	1	0	2	2	6	−4	3		0–4		1–0	—

31 July 1996 2	Felsőtárkány	0–4	Vác	Felsőtárkány
17:00 CEST (UTC+2)		Report	Bánföldi 8'; Schwarcz 58'; Vojtekovszki 76'; Győri 88'	Stadium: Felsőtárkányi Sportpálya; Attendance: 600; Referee: József Bukovics

3 August 1996 3	Rákospalota	0–2	Vác	Budapest
17:00 CEST (UTC+2)		Report	Lévai; Ti. Nagy (pen.)	Stadium: Tábor utca Attendance: 150; Referee: Vencel Tóth

6 August 1996 1	Pálháza	1–1	Vác	Pálháza
14:00 CEST (UTC+2)	S. Szabó 51'	Report	Borgulya 47'	Stadium: Pálházi Sportpálya; Attendance: 2,200; Referee: Attila Hajdó; Assistant referees: Bida, Veres
Note: The match was postponed from its originally scheduled date of 26–28 July 1996 to 6 August.

==== Knockout phase ====
===== Round of 32 =====
7 October 1996 First leg	Vác	2–1	Siófok	Vác
19:00 CEST (UTC+2)	Kasza 7'; Vojtekovszki 39'; Boda (yellow card) 63'; Lévai (yellow card) 72'	Report	Bulatović (yellow card) 10'; Takács 20'; Laurentzy (yellow card) 36'; Z. Szabó (yellow card) 71'	Stadium: Ligeti Stadion; Attendance: 1,000; Referee: László Cserna; Assistant referees: Herbály, Székely

23 October 1996 Second leg	Siófok	2–2 (3–4 agg.)	Vác	Siófok
17:00 CEST (UTC+2)	Juhász (yellow card) 17' (yellow-red card) 84'; Filipović (yellow card) 34', (goal) 60'; Z. Szabó 43'; Kriston (yellow card) 56'	Report	Lajkovics (yellow card) 58'; P. Horváth (yellow card) 79' (yellow-red card) 79'; Vámosi (penalty missed) 85', 85'; Andrași 86'	Stadium: Révész Géza utcai Stadion; Attendance: 1,500; Referee: Ferenc Lettrich; Assistant referees: Herbály, A. Szabó
Note: Vác won 4–3 on aggregate.

===== Round of 16 =====
20 November 1996 First leg	Vác	2–1	Tiszavasvári	Vác
17:00 CET (UTC+1)	Kasza 33', (yellow card) 89'; Ti. Nagy 74' (pen.); Vámosi (yellow card) 81'; P. Kovács (yellow card) 83'	Report	Sinka (yellow card) 69'; Lenkey (yellow card) 74'; Bohács 81' (pen.)	Stadium: Ligeti Stadion; Attendance: 400; Referee: Tamás Arany; Assistant referees: Vámos, László

27 November 1996 Second leg	Tiszavasvári	2–4 (3–6 agg.)	Vác	Tiszavasvári
12:30 CET (UTC+1)	Erdei 60'; Roșu 67'; Bohács (yellow card) 81'	Report	Vojtekovszki (yellow card) 20', (goal) 77'; Vámosi (yellow card) 24'; Bánföldi 46'; Nyikos 66'; Borgulya 87'	Stadium: Városi Sporttelep; Attendance: 1,500; Referee: József Bukovics; Assistant referees: Mezei, Nyilas
Note: Vác won 6–3 on aggregate.

===== Quarter-finals =====
5 March 1997 First leg	Ferencváros	2–2	Vác	Budapest
18:00 CET (UTC+1)	Nychenko 9'; Miriuță 33'	Report	Boda (yellow card) 19'; Borgulya 55', 89'; Kriska (yellow card) 71'	Stadium: Üllői úti Stadion; Attendance: 4,000; Referee: S. Varga; Assistant referees: Lánczos, Farkas

11 March 1997 Second leg	Vác	3–0 (5–2 agg.)	Ferencváros	Vác
18:00 CET (UTC+1)	Boda 2'; Nyikos 64'; Kriska 70'; Andrași (yellow card) 88'	Report	N. Nagy (yellow card) 24'; Nyilas (yellow card) 69'; Zavadszky (yellow card) 76'; Milovanović (red card) 90+3'	Stadium: Ligeti Stadion; Attendance: 5,000; Referee: Tamás Arany; Assistant referees: Vámos, Koch
Note: Vác won 5–2 on aggregate.

===== Semi-finals =====
8 April 1997 First leg	MTK	4–0	Vác	Budapest
19:00 CEST (UTC+2)	Zsivóczky 18'; Illés 21', 47'; Lőrincz 26' (pen.)	Report	Nyikos (yellow card) 37'; Kriska (yellow card) 61'	Stadium: Hungária körúti Stadion; Attendance: 2,000; Referee: Sándor Márton; Assistant referees: A. Szabó, Tamássy

23 April 1997 Second leg	Vác	3–2 (3–6 agg.)	MTK	Vác
18:00 CEST (UTC+2)	Kasza 48'; Andrași 56'; P. Horváth 82'	Report	Halmai 8'; Egressy 12'; Z. Molnár II (yellow card) 60'; Lőrincz (yellow card) 61'	Stadium: Ligeti Stadion; Attendance: 1,000; Referee: László Molnár; Assistant referees: Szökrény, Gyarmati
Note: MTK won 6–3 on aggregate.
