= 1999–2000 Diósgyőri FC season =

Diósgyőr
1999–2000 season
- Manager: Miklós Temesvári (until 5 January 2000); Zoltán Varga (from 12 January to 14 April); Géza Huszák (from 19 April)
- Stadium: Diósgyőri Stadion
- Nemzeti Bajnokság I: 16th (relegated)
- Magyar Kupa: Round of 32
- Highest home attendance: 13,000 v Ferencváros (3 October 1999, Nemzeti Bajnokság I)
- Lowest home attendance: 1,500 v Vác (17 May 2000, Nemzeti Bajnokság I)
- Average home league attendance: 4,594
- Biggest win: 6–0 v Rákospalota (Away, 4 August 1999, Magyar Kupa)
- Biggest defeat: 0–6 v Dunaferr (Away, 11 December 1999, Nemzeti Bajnokság I)

The 1999–2000 season was Diósgyőri Football Club's 40th competitive season, 3rd consecutive season in the Nemzeti Bajnokság I and 88th season in existence as a football club. In addition to the domestic league, Diósgyőr participated in that season's editions of the Magyar Kupa.

== Squad ==
Note: Flags indicate national team as defined under FIFA eligibility rules; some limited exceptions apply. Players may hold more than one non-FIFA nationality.

No.	Pos.	Nation	Player
—	GK	HUN	Bertalan Bicskei
—	GK	YUG	Vladimir Ćirić
—	GK	HUN	Zoltán Nagy
—	DF	HUN	Balázs Hompoth
—	DF	HUN	Tibor Kovács
—	DF	SVK	František Kunzo
—	DF	YUG	Nenad Pozder
—	DF	HUN	Csaba Szakos
—	DF	HUN	Viktor Takács
—	DF	SVK	Marian Timko
—	DF	HUN	Krisztián Tósa
—	MF	ROU	Relu Buliga
—	MF	HUN	Béla Dukon

No.	Pos.	Nation	Player
—	MF	YUG	Vladan Filipovic
—	MF	HUN	Róbert Harnócz
—	MF	HUN	István Kákóczki
—	MF	HUN	László Lipták
—	MF	HUN	Zsolt Páling
—	MF	ROU	Sorin Radu
—	FW	ROU	Dănuț Frunză
—	FW	SDN	Ibrahim Komi
—	FW	HUN	Péter Konyha
—	FW	HUN	Ákos Lippai
—	FW	HUN	Tamás Lója
—	FW	ROU	Mircea Raican
—	FW	HUN	László Soltész

== Competitions ==
=== Overview ===
Competition	First match	Last match	Starting round	Final position	Record							
Competition	First match	Last match	Starting round	Final position	Pld	W	D	L	GF	GA	GD	Win %
Nemzeti Bajnokság I	7 August 1999	27 May 2000	Matchday 1	16th	32	5	9	18	26	56	−30	15.63
Magyar Kupa	24 July 1999	12 October 1999	Group stage	Round of 32	4	2	1	1	10	3	+7	50.00
Total					36	7	10	19	36	59	−23	19.44

Source: Competitions

=== Nemzeti Bajnokság I ===
==== League table ====
Pos	Team	Pld	W	D	L	GF	GA	GD	Pts	Qualification or relegation
14	Nagykanizsa	32	7	10	15	27	44	−17	31	
15	Siófok (R)	32	7	7	18	26	51	−25	28	Relegation to Nemzeti Bajnokság II
16	Diósgyőr (R)	32	5	9	18	26	56	−30	24	Relegation to Nemzeti Bajnokság II
17	Vác (R)	32	3	6	23	24	85	−61	15	Relegation to Nemzeti Bajnokság II
–	Szeged LC (R)	0	0	0	0	0	0	0	0	Relegation to Nemzeti Bajnokság II

Source: rsssf.com
(R) Relegated

==== Results summary ====
Overall								Home						Away					
Pld	W	D	L	GF	GA	GD	Pts	W	D	L	GF	GA	GD	W	D	L	GF	GA	GD
32	5	9	18	26	56	−30	24	3	7	6	17	21	−4	2	2	12	9	35	−26

==== Results by round ====
Round	1	2	3	4	5	6	7	8	9	10	11	12	13	14	15	16	17	18	19	20	21	22	23	24	25	26	27	28	29	30	31	32	33	34
Ground	H	A	A	H	A	H	A	H	A	H	A	H	A	H	A	H	A	A	H	H	A	H	A	H	A	H	A	H	A	H	A	H	A	H
Result	D	L	L	W	L	D	W	D	L	V	L	D	D	W	W	L	L	L	W	L	L	L	L	D	L	L	V	D	L	L	D	D	L	L
Position	6	14	17	13	14	15	12	13	14	14	14	14	14	13	11	11	12	14	11	14	13	13	14	15	15	15	15	15	15	15	15	15	16	16
Points	1	1	1	4	4	5	8	9	9	9	9	10	11	14	17	17	17	17	20	20	20	20	20	21	21	21	21	22	22	22	23	24	24	24

A = Away; H = Home; W = Win; D = Draw; L = Loss; V = Void

==== Matches ====
7 August 1999 1	Diósgyőr	2–2	Nyírség-Spartacus	Miskolc
17:00 CEST (UTC+2)	Frunză 25', 54'; Kovács (yellow card) 55'; Timko (yellow card) 69'	Report	Ács (yellow card) 9'; Novák 31'; Szabó 64'; Turóczi (yellow card) 83'	Stadium: Diósgyőri Stadion; Attendance: 10,000; Referee: László Cserna; Assistant referees: T. Vámos, Tamássy

14 August 1999 2	Győr	4–0	Diósgyőr	Győr
17:00 CEST (UTC+2)	Vayer 18'; Vámosi (yellow card) 55'; Herczeg 59'; L. Nagy (yellow card) 67'; Szarvas (yellow card) 72', (goal) 76'; Csiszár 89'	Report		Stadium: Stadion ETO; Attendance: 6,000; Referee: Béla Kiss; Assistant referees: G. Kiss, Kispál

21 August 1999 3	Debrecen	2–0	Diósgyőr	Debrecen
17:00 CEST (UTC+2)	Böőr (yellow card) 7'; Pető (yellow card) 19'; Sabo 47', (yellow card) 63'; Bajzát 90'	Report	Frunză (yellow card) 35'; Raican (yellow card) 36'; Radu (yellow card) 76'	Stadium: Oláh Gábor utcai Stadion; Attendance: 5,000; Referee: Ferenc Bede; Assistant referees: Dr. Hegyi, Koszó

29 August 1999 4	Diósgyőr	4–1	Újpest	Miskolc
17:00 CEST (UTC+2)	Frunză 2', 33'; Radu 35'; Buliga (yellow card) 41'; Komi 46', (yellow card) 46'; Szakos (yellow card) 48'	Report	T. Pető (yellow card) 41'; Terjék (yellow card) 42'; Zimmermann (yellow card) 45'; Tamási 54'; N. Tóth (yellow card) 72'; Z. Kovács (red card) 73'; Tokody (yellow card) 86'	Stadium: Diósgyőri Stadion; Attendance: 8,000; Referee: Attila Hajdó; Assistant referees: G. Kiss, Kispál

11 September 1999 5	Tatabánya	2–1	Diósgyőr	Budapest (Note: The match were played at the Béke téri Stadion in Budapest, instead of Tatabánya regular stadium, the Városi Stadion in Tatabánya.)
16:30 CEST (UTC+2)	Kiprich 19' (pen.); Kiss 83', (yellow card) 86'; Letenyei (yellow card) 90+2'	Report	Timko (yellow card) 19'; Hompoth (yellow card) 29'; Radu (yellow card) 44'; Kunzo 52'	Stadium: Béke téri Stadion; Attendance: 1,500; Referee: Attila Dubraviczky; Assistant referees: Ring, Tamássy

18 September 1999 6	Diósgyőr	1–1	Nagykanizsa	Miskolc
16:00 CEST (UTC+2)	Radu (yellow card) 25'; Timko 73'; Kunzo (yellow card) 77'; Raican (yellow card) 84'	Report	Zahorecz 5'; Marinković (yellow card) 29'; Panghy (yellow card) 85'	Stadium: Diósgyőri Stadion; Attendance: 3,500; Referee: Zsolt Szabó; Assistant referees: Nyilas, Z. Szabó

25 September 1999 7	Siófok	0–2	Diósgyőr	Siófok
19:00 CEST (UTC+2)	Sallai (red card) 60'; Bimbó (yellow card) 74'	Report	Kunzo 8', (yellow card) 45'; Raican 10'; Szakos (yellow card) 29'; Páling (yellow card) 62'; Timko (yellow card) 69'	Stadium: Révész Géza utcai Stadion; Attendance: 1,000; Referee: András Sóthy; Assistant referees: G. László, I. Molnár

3 October 1999 8	Diósgyőr	0–0	Ferencváros	Miskolc
15:00 CEST (UTC+2)	Kákóczki (yellow card) 53'; Filipovic (yellow card) 88'	Report	Füzi (yellow card) 20'; J. Mátyus (yellow card) 21'; Lakos (yellow card) 45'	Stadium: Diósgyőri Stadion; Attendance: 13,000; Referee: Ferenc Bede; Assistant referees: Tompos, Vámos

15 October 1999 9	Kispest-Honvéd	2–0	Diósgyőr	Budapest
20:00 CEST (UTC+2)	Hungler 9'; Frunză 32' (o.g.); Hercegfalvi (yellow card) 53'	Report		Stadium: Bozsik József Stadion; Attendance: 2,000; Referee: Sándor Puhl; Assistant referees: Hanyecz, Ring

23 October 1999 10	Diósgyőr	0–0	Szeged	Miskolc
14:30 CEST (UTC+2)	Frunză (yellow card) 80'; Szakos (yellow card) 90'	Report	Udvari (yellow card) 53'; Bencze (yellow card) 77'	Stadium: Diósgyőri Stadion; Attendance: 2,500; Referee: Béla Kiss; Assistant referees: Sápi, Vámos
Note: On 14 March 2000, the Disciplinary Committee of the HFF expelled Szeged from the league, and in accordance with the regulations, all results previously achieved by the Szeged team were annulled.

30 October 1999 11	Haladás	1–0	Diósgyőr	Szombathely
16:30 CEST (UTC+2)	Somfalvi (yellow card) 41'; Halmosi (yellow card) 63'; Rosca (yellow card) 85'; A. Horváth 86'; Bodor (yellow card) 90'; Balassa (yellow card) 90+2'	Report	Filipovic (yellow card) 25' (yellow-red card) 66'	Stadium: Rohonci út Attendance: 1,500; Referee: Viktor Kassai; Assistant referees: Mező, Dr. Répássy

6 November 1999 12	Diósgyőr	1–1	Vasas	Miskolc
13:00 CET (UTC+1)	Frunză 66'	Report	Galaschek 20'; Zováth (yellow card) 29'	Stadium: Diósgyőri Stadion; Attendance: 3,000; Referee: Attila Juhos; Assistant referees: J. Szabó, G. Kiss

15 November 1999 13	Gázszer	2–2	Diósgyőr	Székesfehérvár
19:00 CET (UTC+1)	Schindler 52'; Dvéri 81'	Report	Konyha 28'; Frunză 69'	Stadium: Sóstói Stadion; Attendance: 1,000; Referee: Attila Hanacsek; Assistant referees: P. Kovács, Székely

27 November 1999 15	Vác	0–2	Diósgyőr	Vác
17:00 CET (UTC+1)	Sipeki (yellow card) 25'	Report	Kunzo 34'; Kákóczki (yellow card) 39'; Buliga (yellow card) 58'; Frunză (yellow card) 83', (goal) 88'	Stadium: Ligeti Stadion; Attendance: 500; Referee: István Hanyecz; Assistant referees: Kassai, Mező

4 December 1999 16	Diósgyőr	0–2	MTK	Miskolc
13:00 CET (UTC+1)	Lipták (yellow card) 3'; Kunzo (yellow card) 49'	Report	Illés 10'; Elek (yellow card) 43'; Madar 58'; Kenesei (yellow card) 59'	Stadium: Diósgyőri Stadion; Attendance: 4,000; Referee: Béla Kiss; Assistant referees: T. Vámos, Radvánszky

8 December 1999 14	Diósgyőr	2–1	Zalaegerszeg	Miskolc
13:00 CET (UTC+1)	Frunză (yellow card) 35' (yellow-red card) 90+1', (goal) 59'; Filipovic 48'; Konyha (yellow card) 75'; Z. Nagy (yellow card) 82'	Report	J. Sebők 33'; Balog (yellow card) 35'; Babati (yellow card) 82'	Stadium: Diósgyőri Stadion; Attendance: 2,000; Referee: Attila Hajdó; Assistant referees: Sápi, Nyilas

11 December 1999 17	Dunaferr	6–0	Diósgyőr	Dunaújváros
13:00 CET (UTC+1)	Zavadszky 14'; Tököli 35', 57', 68'; T. Nagy 45'; Komódi (yellow card) 59'; Jäkl 81' (pen.)	Report	Komi (yellow card) 42'; V. Takács (yellow card) 72'; Hompoth (yellow card) 81' (red card)	Stadium: Dunaújvárosi Stadion; Attendance: 4,000; Referee: László Cserna; Assistant referees: Tompos, Saskőy

26 February 2000 18	Nyírség-Spartacus	2–0	Diósgyőr	Nyíregyháza
14:00 CET (UTC+1)	Kondora 51'; Domokos (yellow card) 69'; Karkusz 73'	Report	Kákóczki (yellow card) 13'; Ganea (yellow card) 50' (yellow-red card) 81'	Stadium: Városi Stadion; Attendance: 7,000; Referee: Ferenc Bede; Assistant referees: J. Szabó, G. Kiss

4 March 2000 19	Diósgyőr	2–0	Győr	Miskolc
14:30 CET (UTC+1)	Frunză 24'; Filipovic (yellow card) 33'; Radu 85' (pen.)	Report	Posza (red card) 24'; Kiser (yellow card) 28'; Ferenczi (yellow card) 32'; Vámosi (yellow card) 52'; Bajúsz (yellow card) 62'; Z. Sebők (red card) 85'	Stadium: Diósgyőri Stadion; Attendance: 4,000; Referee: Attila Hajdó; Assistant referees: L. Veres, Z. Szbó

8 March 2000 20	Diósgyőr	0–1	Debrecen	Miskolc
14:30 CET (UTC+1)	Vitelki (yellow card) 30'; Frunză (yellow card) 56'	Report	Vadicska (yellow card) 40'; Sabo 75'; Bagoly (yellow card) 87'; Szatmári (yellow card) 90'	Stadium: Diósgyőri Stadion; Attendance: 4,000; Referee: Attila Juhos; Assistant referees: Ring, Koch

11 March 2000 21	Újpest	5–0	Diósgyőr	Budapest (Note: The match was played at the Szőnyi úti Stadion in Budapest, instead of Újpest regular stadium, the Megyeri úti stadion.)
18:00 CET (UTC+1)	Z. Kovács 7', 45'; N. Tóth 39'; Waltner 74'; T. Pető 81' (pen.)	Report	Filipovic (yellow card) 50' (yellow-red card) 75'; Kunzo (red card) 81'	Stadium: Szőnyi úti Stadion; Attendance: 4,000; Referee: Zoltán Szarka; Assistant referees: Boda, Dr. P. Szabó

18 March 2000 22	Diósgyőr	1–2	Tatabánya	Miskolc
15:00 CET (UTC+1)	Radu 22'; Ganea (yellow card) 30'; Hompoth (yellow card) 82'	Report	Gonçalves (yellow card) 8'; S. Nagy 26'; Szalma 85'	Stadium: Diósgyőri Stadion; Attendance: 4,000; Referee: Ferenc Bede; Assistant referees: Tompos, nyilas

25 March 2000 23	Nagykanizsa	2–1	Diósgyőr	Nagykanizsa
15:00 CET (UTC+1)	Farkas (yellow card) 9'; Agić 40'; Papp 86'; Svélecz (yellow card) 90'	Report	Lipták (yellow card) 16'; Kunzo (yellow card) 40'; Raican (yellow card) 45'; Kákóczki (yellow card) 65'; Hompoth (yellow card) 68'; Radu 89'	Stadium: Olajbányász Sporttelep; Attendance: 2,500; Referee: József Szabó; Assistant referees: B. Kiss, Kispál

1 April 2000 24	Diósgyőr	0–0	Siófok	Miskolc
16:30 CEST (UTC+2)	Frunză (yellow card) 84'	Report	Hanák (yellow card) 60'	Stadium: Diósgyőri Stadion; Attendance: 3,000; Referee: Attila Dubraviczky; Assistant referees: P. Kovács, Vámos

5 April 2000 25	Ferencváros	2–0	Diósgyőr	Budapest
18:00 CEST (UTC+2)	Földvári (yellow card) 9'; Rob 24'; Bárányos (yellow card) 25'; Váczi 61'; Csoknay (yellow card) 66'	Report	Szakos (yellow card) 22'; Vitelki (yellow card) 25'; Filipovic (yellow card) 34'; Herczku (yellow card) 35'	Stadium: Üllői úti Stadion; Attendance: 4,652; Referee: Attila Hajdó; Assistant referees: Hanyecz, Z. Szabó

9 April 2000 26	Diósgyőr	1–3	Kispest-Honvéd	Miskolc
16:30 CEST (UTC+2)	Kunzo (yellow card) 45'; Filipovic 48' (pen.); Harnócz (yellow card) 52'	Report	Faragó 33', 82'; G. Horváth 76'	Stadium: Diósgyőri Stadion; Attendance: 5,000; Referee: Sándor Puhl; Assistant referees: Ring, J. Szabó

15 April 2000 27	Szeged	–	Diósgyőr	Szeged
				Stadium: Felső Tisza-parti Stadion
Note: On 14 March 2000, the Disciplinary Committee of the HFF expelled Szeged from the league, and as a result, Szeged’s scheduled opponents in the remaining rounds were awarded byes.

22 April 2000 28	Diósgyőr	1–1	Haladás	Miskolc
17:00 CEST (UTC+2)	Filipovic (yellow card) 32'; Frunză 52', (red card) 73'; Hompoth (yellow card) 89'	Report	A. Horváth (yellow card) 33'; Simon (yellow card) 41'; Kaj 43'; Balogh (yellow card) 73'; G. Nagy (yellow card) 83'	Stadium: Diósgyőri Stadion; Attendance: 3,000; Referee: Ferenc Bede; Assistant referees: B. Kiss, Kispál

29 April 2000 29	Vasas	2–0	Diósgyőr	Budapest
19:00 CEST (UTC+2)	Szilveszter 48'; Sowunmi 51'	Report	Vitelki (yellow card) 23' (yellow-red card) 30'; Kákóczki (yellow card) 24'; Kunzo (yellow card) 36'	Stadium: Fáy utcai Stadion; Attendance: 3,000; Referee: Attila Dubraviczky; Assistant referees: Mező, Gyarmati

6 May 2000 30	Diósgyőr	1–2	Pécs	Miskolc
17:00 CEST (UTC+2)	Barva 54'; Szakos (yellow card) 83'; Hompoth (yellow card) 89'	Report	Király 1'; Gera (yellow card) 23'; Németh (yellow card) 49'; Gálffy 59'; Toldi (yellow card) 79'	Stadium: Diósgyőri Stadion; Attendance: 2,500; Referee: István Hanyecz; Assistant referees: Hrabovszky, Bócsik

13 May 2000 31	Zalaegerszeg	0–0	Diósgyőr	Zalaegerszeg
19:00 CEST (UTC+2)	Z. Szabó I (yellow card) 43'; Balog (penalty missed) 46'; Bonchiş (yellow card) 60'; P. Bencze (yellow card) 79'; Szőke (yellow card) 84'	Report	Vitelki (yellow card) 70'	Stadium: ZTE Stadion; Attendance: 3,500; Referee: Tamás Arany; Assistant referees: Ring, Vámos

17 May 2000 32	Diósgyőr	1–1	Vác	Miskolc
17:00 CEST (UTC+2)	Vitelki (yellow card) 29' (yellow-red card) 72'; Lippai 56'	Report	Burzi (yellow card) 25', (goal) 70'; Fejéregyházi (yellow card) 40'	Stadium: Diósgyőri Stadion; Attendance: 1,500; Referee: Csaba Sápi; Assistant referees: Nyilas, L. Veres

20 May 2000 33	MTK	3–1	Diósgyőr	Budapest
17:00 CEST (UTC+2)	Szamosi 8'; Illés 27'; Komlósi (yellow card) 28'; Kincses (yellow card) 45', (goal) 51'	Report	V. Takács (yellow card) 65'; G. Takács 84', (yellow card) 84'	Stadium: Hungária körúti Stadion; Attendance: 500; Referee: András Sóthy; Assistant referees: Makai, Székely

27 May 2000 34	Diósgyőr	0–3 (awd.)	Dunaferr	Miskolc
17:00 CEST (UTC+2)	Lippai 3'	Report	H. Rósa (yellow card) 12', (goal) 15'; Nychenko 17'	Stadium: Diósgyőri Stadion; Attendance: 3,000; Referee: Attila Hajdó; Assistant referees: J. Szabó, Koch
Note: The match was abandoned in the 23rd minute with the score at 1–2 due to disorderly conduct by spectators, and the three points from the abandoned fixture were awarded to Dunaferr with a 3–0 scoreline.

=== Magyar Kupa ===
==== Group stage ====
Pos	Team	Pld	W	D	L	GF	GA	GD	Pts	Qualification	DIO	PAS	RAK	HEV
1	Diósgyőr	3	2	1	0	10	2	+8	7	Advance to knockout phase	—			
2	Pásztó	3	1	2	0	4	2	+2	5	Advance to knockout phase	1–1	—	0–0	3–1
3	Rákospalota	3	0	2	1	2	8	−6	2		0–6		—	
4	Heves	3	0	1	2	4	8	−4	1		1–3		2–2	—

24 July 1999 1	Pásztó	1–1	Diósgyőr	Pásztó
17:00 CEST (UTC+2)	Mátyus (yellow card); Jeney (yellow card); Árva (yellow card); André (yellow card); Cristea 9'	Report	Hompoth (yellow card); V. Takács (yellow card) , (goal) 75'	Stadium: Hajós Alfréd utca Attendance: 700; Referee: B. Kiss; Assistant referees: Koch, Csorba

31 July 1999 2	Heves	1–3	Diósgyőr	Heves
17:00 CEST (UTC+2)	Lólé 83'	Report	Frunză 5', 37'; Buliga (yellow card) 9'; Raican 12'; Lippai (red card) 52'	Stadium: Városi Sportpálya; Attendance: 600; Referee: Mohácsi

4 August 1999 3	Rákospalota	0–6	Diósgyőr	Budapest
17:00 CEST (UTC+2)	Czene (yellow card) 40' (yellow-red card) 40'	Report	Raican 9', 40'; Filipovic 47'; Timko 60'; Radu 77', 80'	Stadium: Budai II. László Stadion; Attendance: 200; Referee: Horváth

==== Knockout phase ====
12 October 1999 Round of 32	Fót	1–0	Diósgyőr	Fót
14:00 CEST (UTC+2)	Dunai (yellow card) 19'; Hajdú 26'; Bálint (yellow card) 54'; Kilik (yellow card) 74'	Report	Timko (yellow card) 24'; Komi (yellow card) 25' (yellow-red card) 61'; Radu (yellow card) 72'; Harnócz (yellow card) 79'	Stadium: FSE Sporttelep; Attendance: 800; Referee: T. Arany; Assistant referees: Radvánszky, G. László
