= List of Nyíregyháza Spartacus FC managers =

Nyíregyháza Spartacus FC is a professional football club based in Nyíregyháza, Hungary.

== Managers ==
Manager	Nationality	From	To	P	W	D	L	GF	GA	Win	Honours	Notes
János Gerliczki	Hungary	1977	1978									
László Aranyi	Hungary	1978										
Miklós Temesvári	Hungary	1978	1981									
László Papp	Hungary	1981	1982									
Mihály Urbankovics (interim)	Hungary	1982										
György Magyar	Hungary	1982	1983									
Dénes Eszenyi (interim)	Hungary	1983										
Imre Kovács	Hungary	1983	1984									
Jenő Dalnoki	Hungary	1984	1985									
Mihály Ubrankovics	Hungary	1985	1986									
János Tóth	Hungary	1986	1988									
György Buús	Hungary	1988	1989									
Ishtvan Shandor	Soviet Union	1989	1992									
Győző Burcsa	Hungary	1993										
György Buús	Hungary	1994										
János Tóth	Hungary	1995	1996									
János Kovács	Hungary	1996										
Miklós Kiss	Hungary	1996	1997									
Gyula Bozai	Hungary	1997										
Tibor Őze	Hungary	1997	2000									
Lajos Garamvölgyi	Hungary	2000	2001									
Ishtvan Shandor	Ukraine	2001										
György Buús (interim)	Hungary	2001										
Károly Kis	Hungary	2001	2003									
György Buús	Hungary	2003										
Attila Herédi	Hungary	9 September 2003	20 September 2004	6	0	3	3	6	15			
Lajos Détári	Hungary	21 September 2004	30 June 2005	24	5	8	11	32	48			
György Madalina	Hungary	2005	2006									
György Gálhidi	Hungary	1 April 2006	30 June 2007									
József Tajti		1 July 2007	31 December 2007	7	3	1	3	7	8			
Attila Révész	Hungary	2007	2009									
András Szabó	Hungary	2009										
József Tajti	Hungary	2 May 2009	20 June 2009	5	1	1	3	5	9			
Lázár Szentes	Hungary	2009	2010									
János Brekk	Hungary	21 June 2010	27 April 2011	24	14	6	4	49	19			
János Brekk	Hungary	27 June 2011	1 August 2011									
János Kovács	Hungary	2011										
György Gálhidi	Hungary	1 August 2011	5 February 2012	16	2	10	4	21	31			
János Brekk	Hungary	1 July 2012	10 March 2013	20	9	4	7	27	28			
Tamás Lucsánszky	Hungary	17 May 2013	30 June 2014	47	29	6	12	83	44			
József Csábi	Hungary	1 July 2014	20 October 2014	12	2	2	8	10	19			
János Mátyus	Hungary	20 October 2014	22 October 2016	39	15	8	16	54	62			
György Véber	Hungary	24 October 2016	20 August 2017	17	4	3	10	19	23			
László Dajka	Hungary	21 April 2017	30 June 2017	8	4	2	2	16	13			
Tamás Lucsánszky	Hungary	20 June 2017	10 May 2020	37	17	12	8	59	41			
József Bozsik	Hungary	11 May 2018	2 October 2018	15	3	4	8	13	19			
Zoran Spišljak	Serbia England	20 December 2018	6 November 2019	32	14	5	13	46	49			
Roland Lengyel (interim)	Hungary	7 November 2019	12 November 2019	1	1	0	0	3	0			
Roland Lengyel	Hungary	13 November 2019	26 April 2020	12	6	1	5	22	17			
György Gálhidi	Hungary	1 May 2020	30 April 2021	36	14	9	13	37	30			
Géza Huszák	Hungary	2021										
Sergey Patsay	Kazakhstan	19 May 2021	19 October 2021	13	5	5	3	21	20			
Tamás Feczkó	Hungary	20 October 2021	14 August 2022	22	7	5	10	21	26			
Géza Huszák	Hungary	15 August 2022	1 December 2022	17	7	3	7	28	24			
Roland Lengyel (interim)	Hungary	2 December 2022	13 December 2022	2	0	1	1	1	3			
Ede Višinka	Serbia	14 December 2022	24 March 2023	8	1	3	4	10	15			
Tivadar Fekete (caretaker)	Hungary	24 March 2023	30 June 2023	10	2	4	4	10	12			
Krisztián Tímár	Hungary	16 June 2023	7 April 2025	69	37	13	19	124	90			
István Szabó	Hungary	8 April 2025	28 October 2025	18	5	6	7	21	35			
Tamás Bódog	Hungary	29 October 2025										
