= Rott =

Rott may refer to:

== Places ==
- Rott (Ammersee), a tributary of the Ammersee, in Bavaria, Germany
- Rott (Inn, Neuhaus am Inn), a tributary of the Inn at Neuhaus am Inn, in eastern Bavaria, Germany
- Rott (Inn, Rott am Inn) a tributary of the Inn at Rott am Inn, next to Großkarolinenfeld, in southern Bavaria, Germany
- Rott am Inn, a municipality in the district of Rosenheim, Bavaria, Germany
- Rott, a borough of the municipality Großkarolinenfeld, Bavaria, Germany
- Rott, Landsberg, a municipality in the district of Landsberg, Bavaria, Germany
- Rott, Rhineland-Palatinate, a municipality in Rhineland-Palatinate, Germany
- Rott, Bas-Rhin, a commune in Alsace, France
- Rott, a village in the municipality of Vaals, the Netherlands
- Rott Abbey, in Rott am Inn

== Abbreviations ==
- Rise of the Triad, a 1994 video game
  - Rise of the Triad (2013 video game)
- Rott, nickname for the Rottweiler dog breed
- Realm of the Titans

== People with the surname ==
- Ferenc Rott (born 1970), Hungarian football player
- Hans Rott (1858–1884), Austrian composer
- Oldřich Rott (born 1951), Czech footballer
- Sándor Rott (1868–1942), Hungarian actor
- Vladimir Rott, (born 1935) Canadian engineer turned author
- Wolfgang Rott (born 1946), German field hockey player
- Yannick Rott (born 1974), French football player

== See also ==
- Rott Formation, a geologic formation in Germany
- Rotte (disambiguation)
