= Ferenc Rott =

Hungarian footballer

Personal information
- Full name: Ferenc Rott
- Date of birth: 6 October 1970 (age 56)
- Place of birth: Somberek, Hungary
- Height: 1.86 m (6 ft 1 in)
- Position: Goalkeeper

Team information
- Current team: BVSC Budapest

Senior career*
Years	Team	Apps	(Gls)
1990–1993	Veszprémi LC	23	(0)
1993–1997	Budapest Honvéd FC	7	(0)
1997–1998	Szombathelyi Haladás	12	(0)
1998–1999	Budapest Honvéd FC	5	(0)
1999	BVSC Budapest	12	(0)
- * Club domestic league appearances and goals

Ferenc Rott (born 6 October 1970 in Somberek) is a Hungarian football player who currently plays for BVSC Budapest.
