= István Borgulya =

Hungarian footballer

Personal information
- Full name: István Borgulya
- Date of birth: 5 February 1971 (age 55)
- Place of birth: Budapest, Hungary
- Height: 1.72 m (5 ft 7 1/2 in)
- Position: Forward

Senior career*
Years	Team	Apps	(Gls)
1989–1990	Budapest Honvéd	4	(0)
1990–1991	Volán FC	7	(0)
1991–1994	BVSC	57	(8)
1994–1995	Vasas SC	21	(1)
1995–1997	Vác FC	49	(8)
1997	Stadler FC	15	(5)
1997–2003	Budapest Honvéd	102	(23)
2003	Olympia Leoben	15	(10)
2004–2006	Budapest Honvéd	7	(0)
- * Club domestic league appearances and goals as of 22 February 2012, 02:44 AM GMT

Borgulya István (born 5 February 1971) is a retired Hungarian footballer who played as a forward. He spent most of his career in Budapest Honvéd.
