= András Lévai (footballer) =

Hungarian footballer (born 1973)

Personal information
- Date of birth: 16 December 1973 (age 52)
- Place of birth: Gödöllő, Hungary
- Height: 1.83 m (6 ft 0 in)
- Position: Defender

Youth career
- Gödöllő

Senior career*
| Years | Team | Apps | (Gls) |
| 1992–1999 | Vác | 125 | (11) |
| 1993–1994 | → Eger (loan) | 25 | (0) |
| 1999–2001 | Videoton | 49 | (3) |
| Total | | 199 | (14) |
- * Club domestic league appearances and goals

András Lévai (born 16 December 1973) is a Hungarian former professional footballer who played as a defender.

== Career ==
On 2 August 1999, Lévai signed a two-year deal with recently relegated Nemzeti Bajnokság II club Videoton.

On 21 December 2001, Videoton decided not to extend his contract, which was set to expire at the end of that year.

== Career statistics ==
Appearances and goals by club, season and competition
| Club | Season | League | | | Magyar Kupa | | Total | |
| Club | Season | Division | Apps | Goals | Apps | Goals | Apps | Goals |
|---|---|---|---|---|---|---|---|---|
| Vác | 1992–93 | Nemzeti Bajnokság I | — | | 1 | 0 | 1 | 0 |
| Vác | 1994–95 | Nemzeti Bajnokság I | 11 | 0 | 5 | 1 | 16 | 1 |
| Vác | 1995–96 | Nemzeti Bajnokság I | 24 | 1 | 7 | 0 | 31 | 1 |
| Vác | 1996–97 | Nemzeti Bajnokság I | 29 | 1 | 9 | 1 | 38 | 2 |
| Vác | 1997–98 | Nemzeti Bajnokság I | 31 | 6 | 6 | 1 | 37 | 7 |
| Vác | 1998–99 | Nemzeti Bajnokság I | 30 | 3 | 5 | 1 | 35 | 4 |
| Vác | Total | | 125 | 11 | 33 | 4 | 158 | 15 |
| Eger (loan) | 1993–94 | Nemzeti Bajnokság II | 25 | 0 | — | | 25 | 0 |
| Videoton | 1999–2000 | Nemzeti Bajnokság II | 35 | 2 | 2 | 0 | 37 | 2 |
| Videoton | 2000–01 | Nemzeti Bajnokság I | 14 | 1 | 4 | 2 | 18 | 3 |
| Videoton | Total | | 49 | 3 | 6 | 2 | 55 | 5 |
| Career total | | | 199 | 14 | 39 | 6 | 238 | 20 |

== Honours ==
Vác

- Magyar Kupa runner-up: 1994–95

Videoton

- Nemzeti Bajnokság II: 1999–2000
- Magyar Kupa runner-up: 2000–01
