= Viktor Brovchenko =

Ukrainian footballer (born 1976)

Personal information
- Full name: Viktor Valeryevich Brovchenko
- Date of birth: 11 October 1976 (age 50)
- Place of birth: Vinnytsia, Ukrainian SSR
- Height: 1.85 m (6 ft 1 in)
- Position: Midfielder

Senior career*
Years	Team	Apps	(Gls)
1992–1998	PFC Nyva Vinnytsia	112	(5)
1998–1999	BVSC Budapest	13	(1)
1999	Torpedo-d Moscow	3	(0)
1999–2000	FC Vinnytsia	7	(1)
2000–2001	FC Lokomotiv Nizhny Novgorod	24	(2)
2001	FC Nyva-Tekstylnyk Dunaivtsi		
2002	FC Chornomorets Odesa	0	(0)
2003	FC Metallurg-Kuzbass Novokuznetsk	13	(0)
2004–2005	FC Karpaty Lviv	23	(3)
2004	→ FC Karpaty-2 Lviv	1	(0)
2005	FC Zakarpattia Uzhhorod	0	(0)
2006	FC Hazovyk-Skala Stryi	3	(0)
2006–2007	Liaoning FC	1	(0)
2011	FC Sovignon Tayirove		
- * Club domestic league appearances and goals

Viktor Valeryevich Brovchenko (Russian: Виктор Валерьевич Бровченко; born 11 October 1976) is a former Ukrainian football player.

== Club career ==
Brovchenko played one season in the Russian Premier League with FC Lokomotiv Nizhny Novgorod.
