= Cătălin Anghel =

Romanian footballer and manager

Personal information
- Full name: Cătălin Constantin Anghel
- Date of birth: 4 October 1974 (age 52)
- Place of birth: Constanța, Romania
- Height: 1.81 m (5 ft 11 in)
- Position: Midfielder

Team information
- Current team: Romania (assistant)

Youth career
- –1993: Farul Constanța

Senior career*
Years	Team	Apps	(Gls)
1994–1996	Farul Constanța		
1996–1997	Milsami		
1997–1999	BVSC Budapest	26	(3)
2000–2003	Kaposvár	35	(4)
2003	Stal Alchevsk	11	(3)
2004–2006	Irtysh		
Total		72	(10)

Managerial career
- 2007–2009: CSO Ovidiu
- 2009–2013: Viitorul Constanța
- 2013–2014: Săgeata Năvodari
- 2015–2021: Viitorul Constanța (assistant)
- 2021: Viitorul Constanța
- 2021–2025: Farul Constanța (assistant)
- 2026–: Romania (assistant)
- * Club domestic league appearances and goals

Cătălin Constantin Anghel (born 4 October 1974) is a Romanian former professional footballer who played as a midfielder, currently assistant coach at the Romania national team.

== Playing career ==
Anghel played for his native club Farul Constanța. He joined Ukrainian First League side FC Stal Alchevsk during the 2003–04 season, and helped the club reach the quarter-finals of the Ukrainian Cup. He then moved to Hungary playing for BVSC Budapest and Kaposvári Rákóczi.

== Coaching career ==
After his retirement, he worked as head coach for CSO Ovidiu and Viitorul Constanța.

== Honours ==
=== Coach ===
Viitorul Constanța

- Liga III: 2009–10
