= Zoltán Varga (footballer, born 1977) =

Hungarian footballer

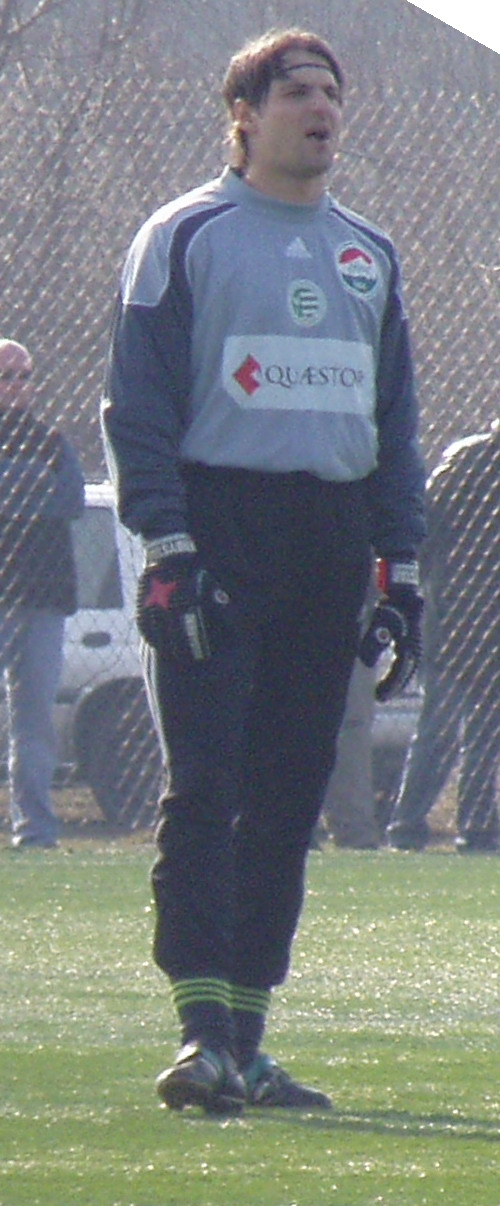
- Zoltán Varga in 2008.

Personal information
- Full name: Zoltán Varga
- Date of birth: 19 August 1977 (age 49)
- Place of birth: Jászberény, Hungary
- Height: 1.87 m (6 ft 2 in)
- Position: Goalkeeper

Senior career*
Years	Team	Apps	(Gls)
1997–1998	BVSC Budapest	1	(0)
1998–1999	Tiszakécske FC	19	(0)
1999–2001	Szombathelyi Haladás	11	(0)
2001–2003	Büki TK	36	(0)
2003–2008	Zalaegerszegi TE	94	(0)
2008	Győri ETO FC	4	(0)
2008	→ Győri ETO FC II	2	(0)

International career
1996–1997	Hungary U-19	2	(0)
1997	Hungary U-20		
1998–1999	Hungary U-21	1	(0)
- * Club domestic league appearances and goals

Zoltán Varga (born 19 August 1977 in Jászberény) is a Hungarian football player who last plays for Győri ETO FC II.
