= Levente Bozsik =

Hungarian footballer (born 1980)

Personal information
- Date of birth: 22 April 1980 (age 46)
- Place of birth: Budapest, Hungary
- Height: 1.89 m (6 ft 2 in)
- Position: Striker

Youth career
- 1987–1997: BVSC Budapest

Senior career*
Years	Team	Apps	(Gls)
1997–1999	BVSC Budapest	12	(0)
2000–2001	Union Berlin	28	(9)
2001	Fortuna Köln	15	(0)
2002	Carl Zeiss Jena	?	(?)
2003	FC KooTeePee	11	(1)
2003–2004	Anagennisi Dherynia		
- * Club domestic league appearances and goals

Levente Bozsik (born 22 April 1980) is a Hungarian former professional footballer who played for several clubs in Europe as a striker.

== Career ==
Bozsik played for BVSC Budapest in Hungary, 1. FC Union Berlin, SC Fortuna Köln and FC Carl Zeiss Jena in the German Regionalliga and FC KooTeePee in the Finnish Veikkausliiga.
