= István Kiss (footballer) =

Hungarian footballer

Personal information
- Full name: István Kiss
- Date of birth: 28 October 1970 (age 56)
- Place of birth: Budapest, Hungary
- Height: 1.76 m (5 ft 9 in)
- Position: Forward

Team information
- Current team: FC Fehérvár

Senior career*
Years	Team	Apps	(Gls)
1989–1991	Ferencvárosi TC	5	(0)
1991–1992	Honvéd Hargita	?	(?)
1992–1997	III. Kerületi TUE	16	(1)
1997–1999	BVSC Budapest	63	(17)
1999–2001	FC Fehérvár	25	(2)
- * Club domestic league appearances and goals

István Kiss (born 28 October 1970 in Budapest) is a Hungarian football player who last played for FC Fehérvár.
