= Rotte =

Rotte can refer to:

- German military airplane formation, see Organization of the Luftwaffe (1933–45)#Schwarm, Rotte and Kette
- Rotte (river) in the Netherlands
- Rotte (psaltery), a medieval string instrument, member of the psaltery family
- Rotte (lyre) or Germanic lyre, a medieval string instrument

== See also ==
- Rott (disambiguation)
