= László Komódi =

Hungarian footballer

Personal information
- Full name: László Komódi
- Date of birth: 7 October 1970 (age 56)
- Place of birth: Hungary
- Height: 1.78 m (5 ft 10 in)
- Position: Midfielder

Senior career*
Years	Team	Apps	(Gls)
	Budapest Honvéd FC	–	(–)
	MTK Budapest FC	–	(–)
	BVSC Budapest	–	(–)
1997–1998	Hapoel Kfar Saba F.C.	–	(–)
1998–1999	Hapoel Ashkelon	–	(–)
1999–2000	Dunaferr SE	–	(–)
2000–2001	Vasas SC	–	(–)
2001–2002	FC Fehérvár	–	(-)
- * Club domestic league appearances and goals

László Komódi (born 7 October 1970 in Hungary) is a Hungarian football player.
