= Attila Forrai =

Hungarian footballer

Personal information
- Full name: Attila Forrai
- Date of birth: 19 August 1973 (age 53)
- Place of birth: Bonyhád, Hungary
- Height: 1.82 m (6 ft 0 in)
- Position: Midfielder

Youth career
- Bonyhád VLC
- Pécsi MFC
- Budapest Honvéd FC
- Bayer Leverkusen

Senior career*
Years	Team	Apps	(Gls)
1993–1998	Budapest Honvéd FC	74	(1)
1997	→ Ferencvárosi TC (on loan)	7	(0)
1998–1999	Gázszer FC	6	(0)
1999–2000	BVSC Budapest	19	(0)
2000	Demecser FC	5	(0)
2000	Gödöllői FC	?	(?)
2000	FC Dabas	?	(?)
2001	Sportfreunde Siegen	3	(0)
2001–2002	Lombard-Pápa TFC	?	(?)
2002	FC Dabas	13	(1)
2003	Budapest Honvéd FC	2	(0)
2004–2005	VSE St. Pölten	?	(?)
2005–2007	Mosonmagyaróvári TE	13	(0)
- * Club domestic league appearances and goals as of 23 January 2009

Attila Forrai (born 19 August 1973) is a Hungarian footballer who played for BVSC Budapest as midfielder.

Forrai previously played in the Regionalliga with Sportfreunde Siegen.
