= Church of Saint George, Somberek =

Serbian Orthodox church in Somberek, Hungary

Church of Saint George
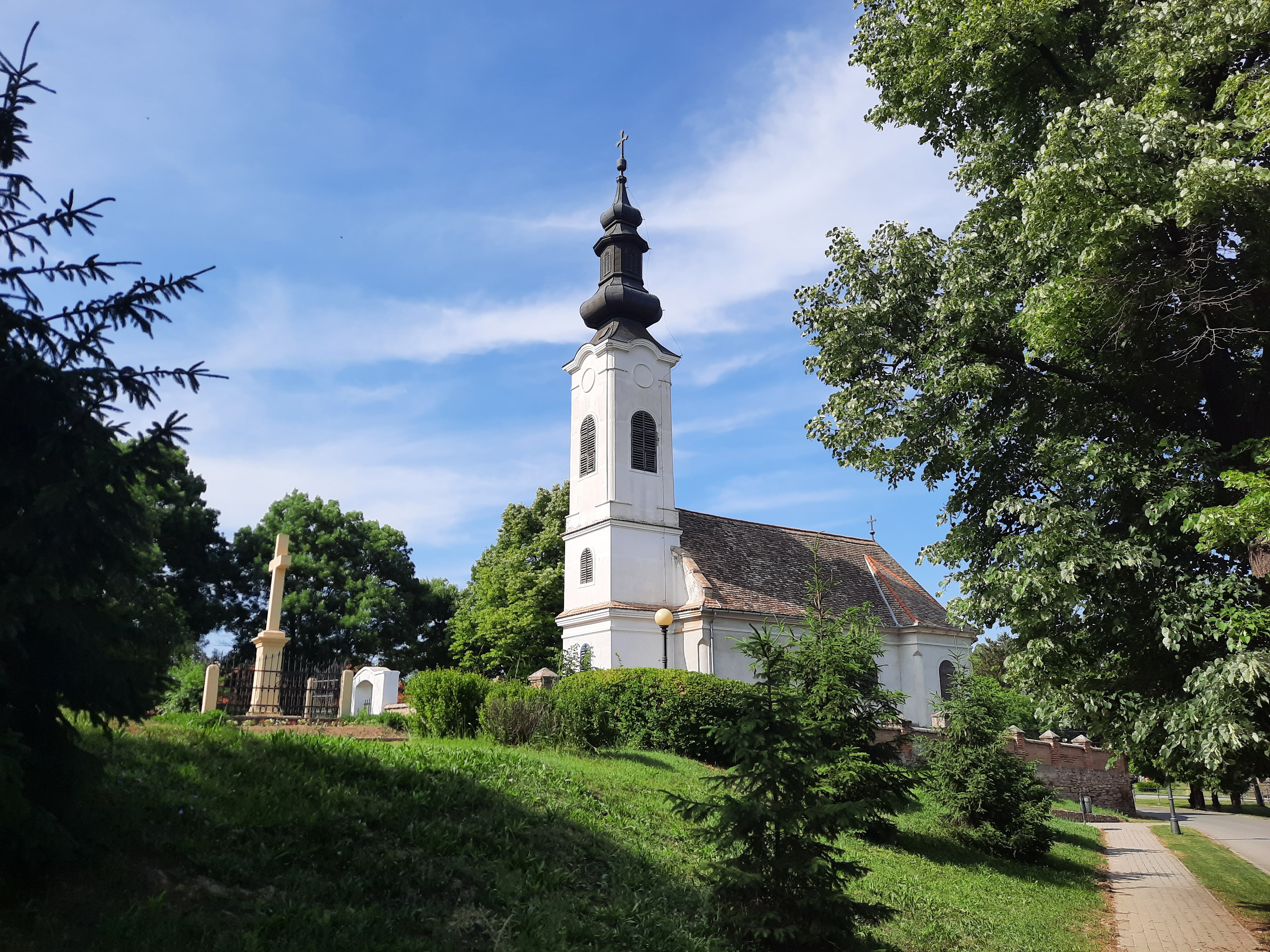
- Church of Saint George
- Church of Saint George
- 46°04′58″N 18°39′31″E
- Location: Somberek, Mohács District, Baranya County
- Country: Hungary
- Denomination: Serbian Orthodox Church

History
- Status: Church
- Dedication: Saint George

Architecture
- Functional status: Active
- Style: Neo-classicism
- Years built: 1793

Administration
- Archdiocese: Eparchy of Buda

The Church of Saint George (Serbian: Црква Светог Георгија, romanized: Crkva Svetog Georgija; Hungarian: Szent György templom) is an Eastern Orthodox church located in Somberek, Hungary. It is under jurisdiction of the Eparchy of Buda of the Serbian Orthodox Church.

Services are usually held only once a year. The church is designated as a protected monument, registered under the registry number 9651 and the KÖH identifier 1928.

== History ==
The church was originally built as a larger single-nave village church in the style of provincial neoclassicism. A tower was added in 1783, featuring a copper Baroque-style segmented cap with a lantern in the middle. The iconostasis was painted in the early 19th century by an unknown iconographer. It was rebuilt in 1793.

== Gallery ==
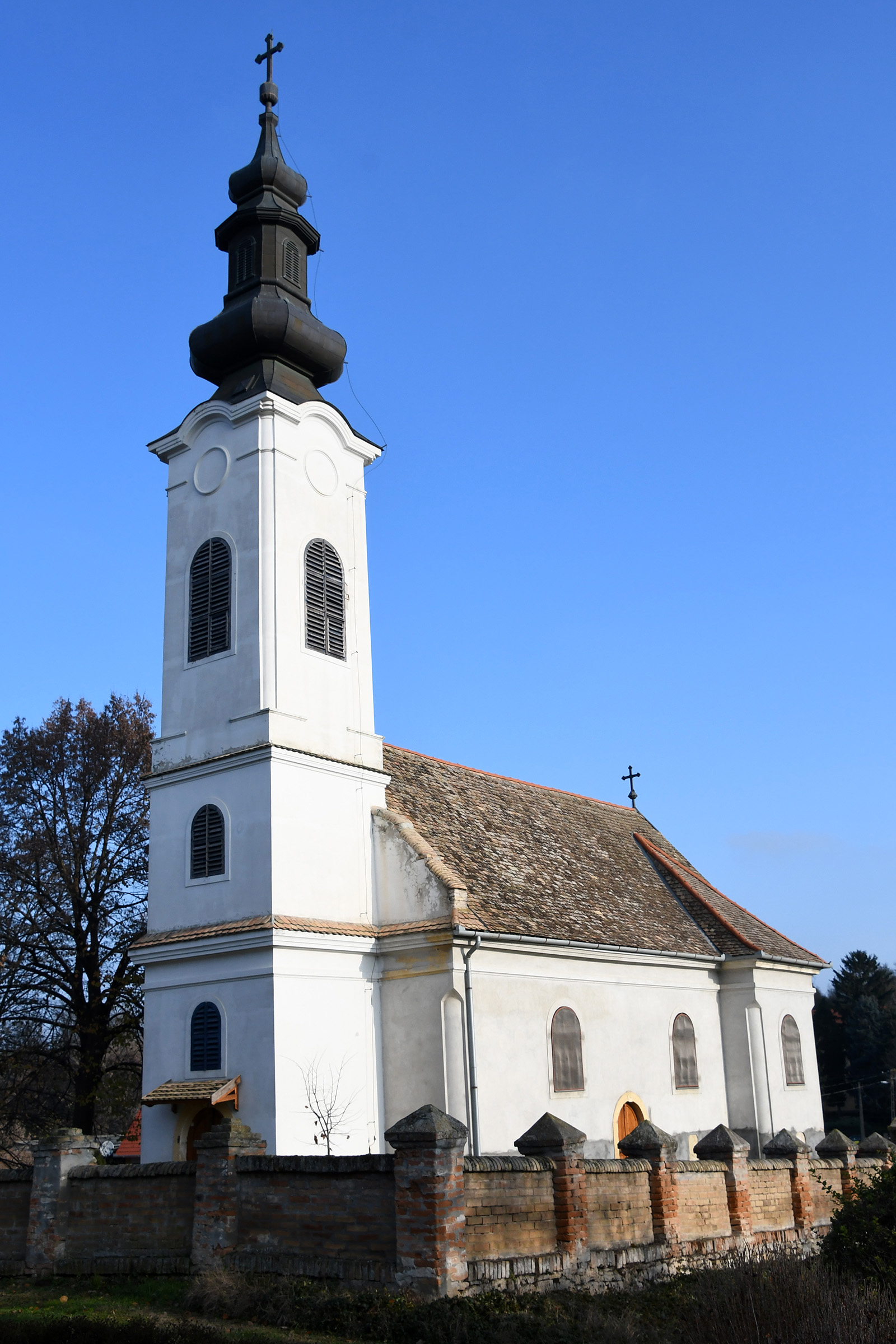
Church pictured in 2020

== See also ==
- Eparchy of Buda
- Serbs of Hungary
