= Ivan Shanhin =

Soviet footballer and coach

Personal information
- Full name: Ivan Hlibovych Shanhin
- Date of birth: 19 August 1955 (age 71)
- Place of birth: Uzhhorod, Ukrainian SSR, Soviet Union
- Position: Defender

Youth career
- Uzhhorod sports school

Senior career*
Years	Team	Apps	(Gls)
1974	FC Pishchevik Bendery		
1975–1976	SC Lutsk	12	(0)
1979	FC Hoverla Uzhhorod	13	(1)
1979–1982	FC Metalurh Zaporizhia	206	(9)
1983	FC Zakarpattia Uzhhorod	7	(2)
1985	FC Zakarpattia Uzhhorod	32	(1)

Managerial career
- 1993–1994: FC Zakarpattia Uzhhorod
- 1994: FC Khimik Zhytomyr
- 1997: FC Zakarpattia Uzhhorod (team chief)
- 1997–1998: FC Zakarpattia Uzhhorod
- * Club domestic league appearances and goals

Ivan Shanhin (Ukrainian: Іван Глібович Шангін; 19 August 1955) is a former professional Soviet football defender and coach.
