= Mykhaylo Mykhalyna =

Soviet-Ukrainian footballer (1924–1998)

Mihály Mihalina / Mykhaylo Mykhalyna
Personal information
- Full name: Mykhaylo Mykhaylovich Mykhalyna
- Date of birth: 15 March 1924
- Place of birth: Poroshkovo, Carpathian Ruthenia, Czechoslovakia
- Date of death: 30 August 1998 (aged 74)
- Place of death: Uzhhorod, Zakarpattia Oblast, Ukraine
- Positions: Defender; midfielder

Youth career
- 1937–1938: SC Rusj Uzhorod
- 1939–1943: SK Rusj Ungvár

Senior career*
Years	Team	Apps	(Gls)
1943–1944	SK Rusj Ungvár		
1945	Dynamo Uzhhorod		
1946–1948	Spartak Uzhhorod		
1948–1955	Dynamo Kyiv	108	(4)
1956	Spartak Uzhhorod	16	(1)

International career
1952–1955	Ukrainian SSR		
1952–1955	USSR-2		

Managerial career
- 1945: Dynamo Uzhhorod
- 1956–1961: Spartak Uzhhorod
- 1963–1968: Verkhovyna Uzhhorod
- 1969–1970: Spartak Ivano-Frankivsk
- 1971: Bukovyna Chernivtsi
- 1975: FC Hoverla Uzhhorod
- * Club domestic league appearances and goals

Mykhaylo Mykhaylovich Mykhalyna (Hungarian: Mihály Mihalina, Slovak: Michal Michalinа, Ukrainian: Михайло Михайлович Михалина, Russian: Михаил Михайлович Михалина, Rusyn: Михаил Михалина; 15 March 1924 – 30 August 1998) was a Hungarian, Ukrainian and Soviet professional footballer, Soviet-Ukrainian football manager and coach. He was the Master of Sports of USSR (1952) and the Honoured Masters of Sport of the USSR (1955). From 1977 to 1983 and 1991 to 1995 he was the president of the Football Federation of Zakarpattia Oblast.

== Honours ==
- Soviet Cup winner: 1954.
- Silver medal of USSR Championship: 1952.
- In the list of the 33 best players (twice №2): 1952

== International career ==
Aside from being named one of the 33 best players in the USSR for 1952, Mykhalyna made his debut for USSR-2 on 26 September 1954 in a friendly against Hungary.

== See also ==
Other famous Soviet Magyar footballers:

- Yozhef Betsa
- Fedir Medvid
- Vasyl Rats
- Yozhef Szabo

Sporting positions
Preceded by Dezyderiy Tovt	Football Federation of Zakarpattia; 1977–1983	Succeeded by ?
Preceded by ?	Football Federation of Zakarpattia; 1991–1995	Succeeded by Andriy Havashi
