= FC Hoverla Uzhhorod =

Hoverla Uzhhorod
- Full name: Football Club Hoverla Uzhhorod
- Founded: 1925; 101 years ago
- Dissolved: 2016; 10 years ago
- Ground: Avanhard Stadium
- Capacity: 12,000
- President: Ivan Shufrych
- Head coach: Vyacheslav Hroznyi
- League: Ukrainian Premier League
- 2015–16: 13th
- Website: fcgoverla.uz.ua (archived)
| Home colours | Away colours |

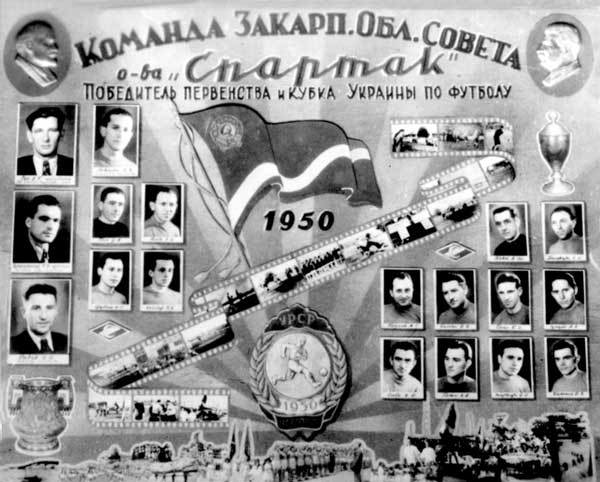
1950 Champion of Ukraine – the Zakarpattia Regional Council team (Spartak society)

Football Club Hoverla Uzhhorod (Ukrainian: Футбольний Клуб "Говерла" Ужгород [ɦoˈwɛrlɐ ˈuʒɦorod]) was a Ukrainian professional football club based in Uzhhorod. Following the end of the 2015–16 season it was expelled from the Ukrainian Premier League because of debts to (current and former) players, and eventually disbanded.

== History ==
The club was inaugurated in 1946 as Spartak Uzhhorod. Some of its emblems point to a predecessor, SC Rus, founded in 1925, although direct links between the two franchises can barely be traced. In 1961, Spartak was renamed Verkhovyna, and in 1971 Hoverla. In 1982, it was renamed Zakarpattia, then Verkhovyna again in 1997 for two years.

During its inaugural season in the Ukrainian championship in 1946, Spartak won the tournament's gold medals. This success was repeated in 1950, when the club also won the Football Cup of the Ukrainian SSR, and 1953. In 1972 the team came second in the Championship of the Ukrainian SSR.

After Ukraine's independence, the team was privatized, coming into ownership of Nestor Shufrych. Zakarpattia started the 2001–02 season in the Ukrainian Premier League, but a last-place finish saw the club demoted to the Ukrainian First League. They returned in 2004–05 and 2007–08 but each time with the same result: relegation from the Premier League after a single season.

Before the start of the 2011–12 Ukrainian First League season the club renamed itself FC Hoverla-Zakarpattia Uzhhorod.

The team renamed themselves Hoverla prior to the start of the 2012–13 Ukrainian Premier League season. Following the season the club was supposed to be relegated according to the season's regulations, yet conveniently both runners-up PFC Oleksandriya and FC Stal Alchevsk refused to get promoted, while the Football Federation of Ukraine refused other teams to get promoted.

On 8 June 2016, (after the end of the 2015–16 season) the club did not get a licence to continue to play in the league due to debts to (current and former) players and was thus de facto expelled from the Ukrainian Premier League. It then ceased to exist.

=== Name changes ===
- (Soviet Union) 1946 – Spartak
- (Soviet Union) 1961 – Verkhovyna
- (Soviet Union) 1971 – Hoverla
- (Soviet Union) / (Ukrainian Soviet Socialist Republic) 1982 – Zakarpattia
- (Ukraine) 1997 – Verkhovyna
- (Ukraine) 1999 – Zakarpattia
- (Ukraine) 2011 – Hoverla-Zakarpattia
- (Ukraine) 2012 – Hoverla

=== Football kits and sponsors ===
| Years | Football kit | Shirt sponsor |
|---|---|---|
| 2001–02 | lotto/adidas | – |
| 2004–06 | lotto | – |
| 2007–08 | lotto | – |
| 2009–10 | lotto | – |
| 2012–14 | adidas | – |

== Honors ==
- Ukrainian First League
  - Winners (3): 2003–04, 2008–09, 2011–12
  - Runners-up (2): 2001–02, 2006–07
- Ukrainian Second League
  - Winners (1): 1998–99 (Group A)

=== In Soviet Union ===
- Football Championship of the Ukrainian SSR
  - Winners (3): 1946, 1950, 1953
  - Runners-up (1): 1972
- Cup of the Ukrainian SSR
  - Winners (1): 1950

== League and cup history ==
| Season | Div. | Pos. | Pl. | W | D | L | GS | GA | P | Domestic Cup | Europe | Notes |
|---|---|---|---|---|---|---|---|---|---|---|---|---|
| 1992 | 2nd "B" | 5 | 26 | 13 | 5 | 8 | 28 | 25 | 31 | 1/32 finals | | |
| 1992–93 | 2nd | 16 | 42 | 13 | 10 | 19 | 45 | 56 | 36 | 1/64 finals | | |
| 1993–94 | 2nd | 14 | 38 | 12 | 8 | 18 | 33 | 53 | 32 | 1/32 finals | | |
| 1994–95 | 2nd | 17 | 38 | 12 | 10 | 20 | 40 | 62 | 46 | 1/16 finals | | |
| 1995–96 | 2nd | 17 | 42 | 14 | 8 | 20 | 49 | 67 | 50 | 1/32 finals | | |
| 1996–97 | 2nd | 15 | 46 | 17 | 7 | 22 | 56 | 78 | 58 | 1/32 finals 1st Stage | | as Verhovyna |
| 1997–98 | 2nd | 20 | 42 | 7 | 11 | 24 | 42 | 79 | 32 | 1/32 finals | | Relegated as Verhovyna |
| 1998–99 | 3rd "A" | 1 | 28 | 20 | 6 | 2 | 48 | 14 | 66 | 1/64 finals | | Promoted |
| 1999–00 | 2nd | 13 | 34 | 14 | 6 | 14 | 36 | 49 | 48 | 1/16 finals | | |
| 2000–01 | 2nd | 2 | 34 | 19 | 7 | 8 | 50 | 38 | 64 | 1/8 finals | | Promoted |
| 2001–02 | 1st | 14 | 26 | 5 | 6 | 15 | 23 | 49 | 21 | 1/4 finals | | Relegated |
| 2002–03 | 2nd | 7 | 34 | 14 | 9 | 11 | 27 | 26 | 51 | 1/16 finals | | |
| 2003–04 | 2nd | 1 | 34 | 22 | 4 | 8 | 49 | 27 | 70 | 1/16 finals | | Promoted |
| 2004–05 | 1st | 12 | 30 | 7 | 10 | 13 | 21 | 30 | 31 | 1/32 finals | | |
| 2005–06 | 1st | 16 | 30 | 3 | 6 | 21 | 17 | 53 | 15 | 1/16 finals | | Relegated |
| 2006–07 | 2nd | 2 | 36 | 25 | 5 | 6 | 50 | 22 | 80 | 1/16 finals | | Promoted |
| 2007–08 | 1st | 16 | 30 | 3 | 9 | 18 | 17 | 54 | 18 | 1/16 finals | | Relegated |
| 2008–09 | 2nd | 1 | 32 | 21 | 6 | 5 | 55 | 28 | 69 | 1/8 finals | | Promoted |
| 2009–10 | 1st | 16 | 30 | 5 | 4 | 21 | 18 | 44 | 19 | 1/16 finals | | Relegated |
| 2010–11 | 2nd | 6 | 34 | 16 | 8 | 10 | 51 | 40 | 56 | 1/32 finals | | |
| 2011–12 | 2nd | 1 | 34 | 27 | 3 | 4 | 67 | 16 | 84 | 1/16 finals | | Promoted |
| 2012–13 | 1st | 15 | 30 | 5 | 7 | 18 | 29 | 57 | 22 | 1/8 finals | | |
| 2013–14 | 1st | 12 | 28 | 7 | 5 | 16 | 26 | 39 | 26 | 1/16 finals | | |
| 2014–15 | 1st | 12 | 26 | 3 | 10 | 13 | 22 | 47 | 19 | 1/8 finals | | |
| 2015–16 | 1st | 13 | 26 | 3 | 7 | 16 | 13 | 45 | 7 | 1/16 finals | | −9 |

In their last season the club was deducted nine points due to not complying with decisions of the FFU Control and Disciplinary Committee (CDC).

== Managers ==
USSR

- (Soviet Union) Bertalon Veyg (1946–47)
- (Soviet Union) Fedir Kuruts & Bertalon Veig (1948–49)
- (Soviet Union) Vasyl Radyk & Ferents Kuruts (1950–51)
- (Soviet Union) Vasyl Radyk (1952)
- (Soviet Union) Bertalon Veyg & Vasyl Radyk (1953)
- (Soviet Union) Karoy Sabo & Ferenc Kuruc (1954–55)
- (Soviet Union) Mykhaylo Mykhalyna (1956–59)
- (Soviet Union) Mykhaylo Mykhalyna & Ernest Yust (1960–61)
- (Soviet Union) Mykhaylo Mykhalyna (1963–68)
- (Soviet Union) Vasyl Revachko & Zoltan Dyerfi (1969–70)
- (Soviet Union) Vasyl Turyanchyk (1971)
- (Soviet Union) Dezyderiy Tovt & Ivan Pazho (1972–73)
- (Soviet Union) Mykhaylo Mykhalyna (1975)
- (Soviet Union) Ishtvan Shandor (197x–78)
- (Soviet Union) Ernest Kesler (1979–8?)
- (Soviet Union) Ishtvan Shandor (1984–87)
- (Soviet Union) Ivan Pazho (1987–88)
- (Soviet Union) Ivan Krasnetskyi (1989–90)

Ukraine

- (Ukrainian Soviet Socialist Republic) (Ukraine) Stepan Voytko (1990–92)
- (Ukraine) Yuriy Chirkov (1992–93)
- (Ukraine) Ivan Shanhin (1993–94)
- (Ukraine) Ernest Kesler (1994)
- (Ukraine) Ivan Ledney (1994)
- (Ukraine) Yuriy Chirkov (1995)
- (Ukraine) Matviy Bobal (1995–96)
- (Ukraine) Oleksandr Holokolosov (1997)
- (Ukraine) Stepan Voytko (1997)
- (Ukraine) Ivan Shanhin (1997–98)
- (Ukraine) Valentyn Khodukin (1998)
- (Ukraine) Viktor Ryashko (1998–2000)
- (Ukraine) Yuriy Kalitvintsev (1 July 2001 – 30 June 2002)
- (Ukraine) Viktor Ryashko (2002–22 Aug 2005)
- (Ukraine) Petro Kushlyk (Sept 7, 2005 – Sept 28, 2007)
- (Ukraine) Volodymyr Sharan (Sept 28, 2007–21 April 2008)
- (Ukraine) Mykhaylo Ivanytsya (21 April 2008 – 30 June 2009)
- (Russia) (Ukraine) Igor Gamula (1 July 2009 – 5 April 2011)
- (Ukraine) Oleksandr Sevidov (7 April 2011 – 26 May 2013)
- (Ukraine) Vyacheslav Hroznyi (18 June 2013 – May 2016)

== Reserve teams and academy ==
=== Zakarpattia-2 Uzhhorod ===
In the 2001–02 Ukrainian Second League season, Hoverla fielded their second squad, which was disbanded after the season.

== See also ==
- FC Uzhhorod
