= Szabolcs Szegletes =

Hungarian footballer

Personal information
- Date of birth: 19 July 1978 (age 48)
- Place of birth: Veszprém, Hungary
- Height: 1.80 m (5 ft 11 in)
- Position: Striker

Senior career*
Years	Team	Apps	(Gls)
1998–1999	BVSC Budapest	8	(0)

International career
1998–1999	Hungary U-21	1	(0)
- * Club domestic league appearances and goals as of 29 November 2008

Szabolcs Szegletes (born 19 July 1978) is a Hungarian footballer who played for BVSC Budapest as striker.
