= Zsolt Aubel =

Hungarian footballer

Personal information
- Date of birth: 20 May 1972 (age 54)
- Place of birth: Budapest, Hungary
- Height: 1.80 m (5 ft 11 in)
- Position: Striker

Youth career
- 1991–1993: FC Monthey
- 1993–1996: III. Kerületi TUE

Senior career*
Years	Team	Apps	(Gls)
1996–1997	III. Kerületi TUE	25	(4)
1997–1999	BVSC Budapest	35	(8)
- * Club domestic league appearances and goals as of 29 November 2008

Zsolt Aubel (born 20 May 1972) is a Hungarian footballer who played for BVSC Budapest as striker.
