= Philip Tarlue =

Liberian footballer

Personal information
- Date of birth: 23 December 1977 (age 48)
- Place of birth: Yepeka, Liberia
- Position: Midfielder

Senior career*
Years	Team	Apps	(Gls)
1996–1998	Budapest Honvéd FC	38	(0)
2003–2004	FC Kochin		
2004	HAL SC		
2004–2005	J&K Bank FC		

International career
1999	Liberia	1	(0)
- * Club domestic league appearances and goals

Philip Tarlue (born 23 December 1977) is a retired Liberian footballer who played as a midfielder.

Tarlue started his career Hungarian club Budapest Honvéd. He played in thirty-eight matches between 1996 and 1998. He was a Liberia international. He played one game for the Liberia national football team in 1999 against Uganda. Between 2003 and 2005 he played for FC Kochin, HAL SC and J&K Bank FC in India. After that, he played in Indonesia.
