= Sergey Patsay =

Kazakhstani footballer

Personal information
- Full name: Sergey Nikolaevich Patsay
- Date of birth: 14 December 1967 (age 58)
- Place of birth: Alma-Ata, Kazakh SSR, Soviet Union
- Positions: Midfielder; forward

Senior career*
| Years | Team | Apps | (Gls) |
| 1984–1986 | SKIF Alma-Ata | 60 | (18) |
| 1987–1988 | Khimik Dzhambul | 35 | (11) |
| 1988 | Kairat | 0 | (0) |
| 1989 | Khimik Dzhambul | 30 | (12) |
| 1990 | Alga Frunze | 34 | (15) |
| 1991 | Neftyanik Fergana | 36 | (4) |
| 1992 | Zorya-MALS Luhansk | 3 | (0) |
| 1992 | Shakhter Karagandy | 4 | (1) |
| 1992 | Nyíregyháza | 4 | (1) |
| 1993 | Hajdúnánás | 19 | (4) |
| 1994 | Kazincbarcikai | 18 | (5) |
| 1995 | Tsesna Akmola | 26 | (10) |
| 1996 | Kairat | 21 | (7) |
| 1997 | Shakhter Karagandy | 15 | (0) |
| 2000 | Záhonyi VSE | 24 | (1) |

International career
| 1996 | Kazakhstan | 2 | (0) |

Managerial career
- 2015–2017: Balmazújvárosi FC
- 2017: MTK Budapest FC
- * Club domestic league appearances and goals

Sergey Patsay (Russian: Сергей Пацай; born 14 December 1967) is a Kazakhstani retired professional footballer who played as a midfielder or forward. He made two appearances for the Kazakhstan national team in 1992.

== Career ==
Patsay started his senior career with RShVSM Alma-Ata. After that, he played for Taraz, Alga Bishkek, Neftchi Fergana, Shakhter Karagandy, Zorya Luhansk, Nyíregyháza Spartacus, Hajdúnánási, and Kazincbarcikai SC. In 1995, he signed for Tsesna, where he made twenty-six league appearances and scored ten goals. He last played for Záhonyi VSC in Hungary.

== Managerial career ==
In 2019, he was appointed as the manager of Nyíregyháza Spartacus FC.
