= Remus Ganea =

Romanian footballer

Personal information
- Full name: Remus Traian Ganea
- Date of birth: 17 September 1972 (age 54)
- Place of birth: Beiuș, Romania
- Height: 1.74 m (5 ft 9 in)
- Position: Left-back

Senior career*
Years	Team	Apps	(Gls)
1992–1993	Bihor Oradea	?	(?)
1994–1995	FC U Craiova	20	(0)
1995	UTA Arad	15	(0)
1996–1999	Național București	30	(0)
1999–2000	Diósgyőr	5	(0)
2000–2001	Apulum Alba Iulia	19	(1)
2002	Astra Ploiești	7	(0)
2002–2003	Bihorul Beiuș	?	(?)
2003–2004	Argeș Pitești	0	(0)
2004–2005	Bihorul Beiuș	?	(?)
2007	Poiana Budureasa	?	(?)
Total		96+	(1+)
- * Club domestic league appearances and goals as of 15 November 2017

Remus Traian Ganea (born 17 September 1972) is a Romanian former professional footballer who played as a left-back. After his retirement, Ganea was the president of Bihorul Beiuș, the club from his hometown, from 2008 until 2014, then the president of the sport club.
