= Tamás Juhár =

Hungarian footballer

Personal information
- Full name: Tamás Juhár
- Date of birth: 20 November 1972 (age 53)
- Place of birth: Sátoraljaújhely, Hungary
- Height: 1.91 m (6 ft 3 in)
- Position: Defender

Senior career*
Years	Team	Apps	(Gls)
1990–2002	Vasas SC	333	(17)
2002–2005	Újpest FC	76	(6)
2005–2007	Nea Salamis Famagusta FC	64	(3)
2008	Újpest FC	6	(0)

International career
2000–2003	Hungary	20	(0)
- * Club domestic league appearances and goals

Tamás Juhár (born 20 November 1972) is a former Hungarian international defender. He started his career as a trainee in the Budapest Football club of Vasas SC. In the season 2002/03, he went to another Budapest side Újpest FC following the relegation of Vasas SC in the Hungarian second division (NB2) and secondly due to his regular selection in the Hungary national team during that period. He joined Nea Salamis Famagusta FC in 2005, and after 2 1/2 seasons he returned to Hungary, joining the squad of Újpest FC for the second time.
