= Đorđe Bajić (footballer) =

Serbian footballer

Personal information
- Full name: Đorđe Bajić
- Date of birth: 23 April 1977 (age 49)
- Place of birth: SFR Yugoslavia
- Height: 1.70 m (5 ft 7 in)
- Position: Midfielder

Senior career*
Years	Team	Apps	(Gls)
1995–1998	Radnički Niš		
1998–1999	BVSC-Zugló	16	(2)
- * Club domestic league appearances and goals

Đorđe Bajić (born 23 April 1977) is a Serbian retired football player who played for BVSC Budapest.
