= Zoltán Nagy (footballer, born 1974) =

Hungarian footballer

Personal information
- Full name: Zoltán Nagy
- Date of birth: 30 March 1974 (age 52)
- Place of birth: Debrecen, Hungary
- Height: 1.90 m (6 ft 3 in)
- Position: Goalkeeper

Senior career*
Years	Team	Apps	(Gls)
1994–1995	Balmazújváros	9	(0)
1995–1996	Hajdúnánás	23	(0)
1997–1998	Debreceni VSC	15	(0)
1999–2000	Diósgyőri VTK	36	(0)
2000–2001	Hapoel Ramat Gan		
2003–2004	Debreceni VSC	15	(0)
2004–2005	Alki Larnaca	23	(0)
2005–2010	Anorthosis Famagusta	43	(0)
2006–2007	→Digenis Morphou (loan)	25	(0)
2010–2011	Doxa Katokopia	8	(0)
2011–2012	Omonia Aradippou	25	(0)
2013–2014	Spartakos Kitiou	25	(0)

Managerial career
- 2012: Ethnikos Achna (goalkeeping coach)
- 2015–2018: Anorthosis Famagusta (youth goalkeeping coach)
- 2017–2018: Anorthosis Famagusta (goalkeeping coach)
- 2018–2019: Doxa Katokopia (goalkeeping coach)
- 2019–: Anorthosis Famagusta (goalkeeping coach)
- * Club domestic league appearances and goals

Zoltán Nagy (born 30 March 1974 in Debrecen, Hungary) is a retired Hungarian goalkeeper.
