= Somberek =

- Village (Falva)
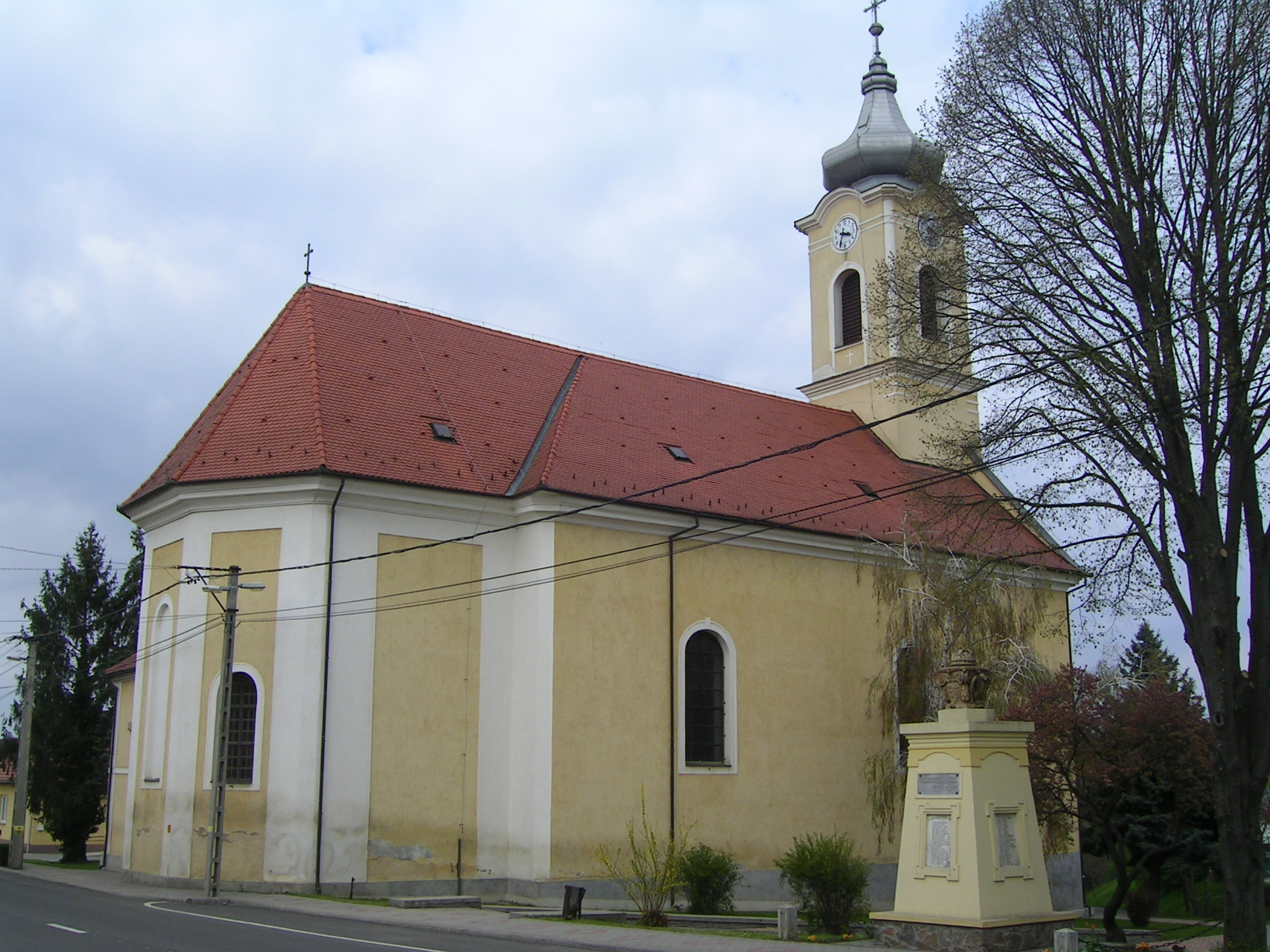
- Roman Catholic church

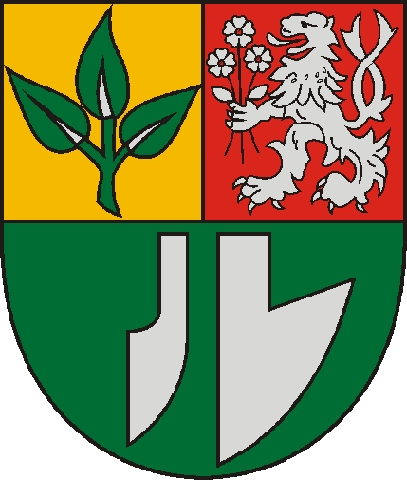
- Coat of arms

- Location of Somberek
- Coordinates: 46.08108°N 18.66226°E
- Country: Hungary
- County: Baranya

Area
  - Total: 31.42 km^{2} (12.13 sq mi)

Population (2004)
  - Total: 1,605
  - Density: 51.08/km^{2} (132.3/sq mi)
- Time zone: UTC+1 (CET)
  - Summer (DST): UTC+2 (CEST)
- Postal code: 7728
- Area code: 69
- Website: http://somberek.hu/

Somberek (German: Schomberg, Serbian: Шумберак / Šumberak) is a village in Baranya county, Hungary. Residents are Hungarians, with a minority of Germans and their descendants.

== See also ==
- Church of St. George, Somberek
