= József Csábi =

Hungarian football and manager

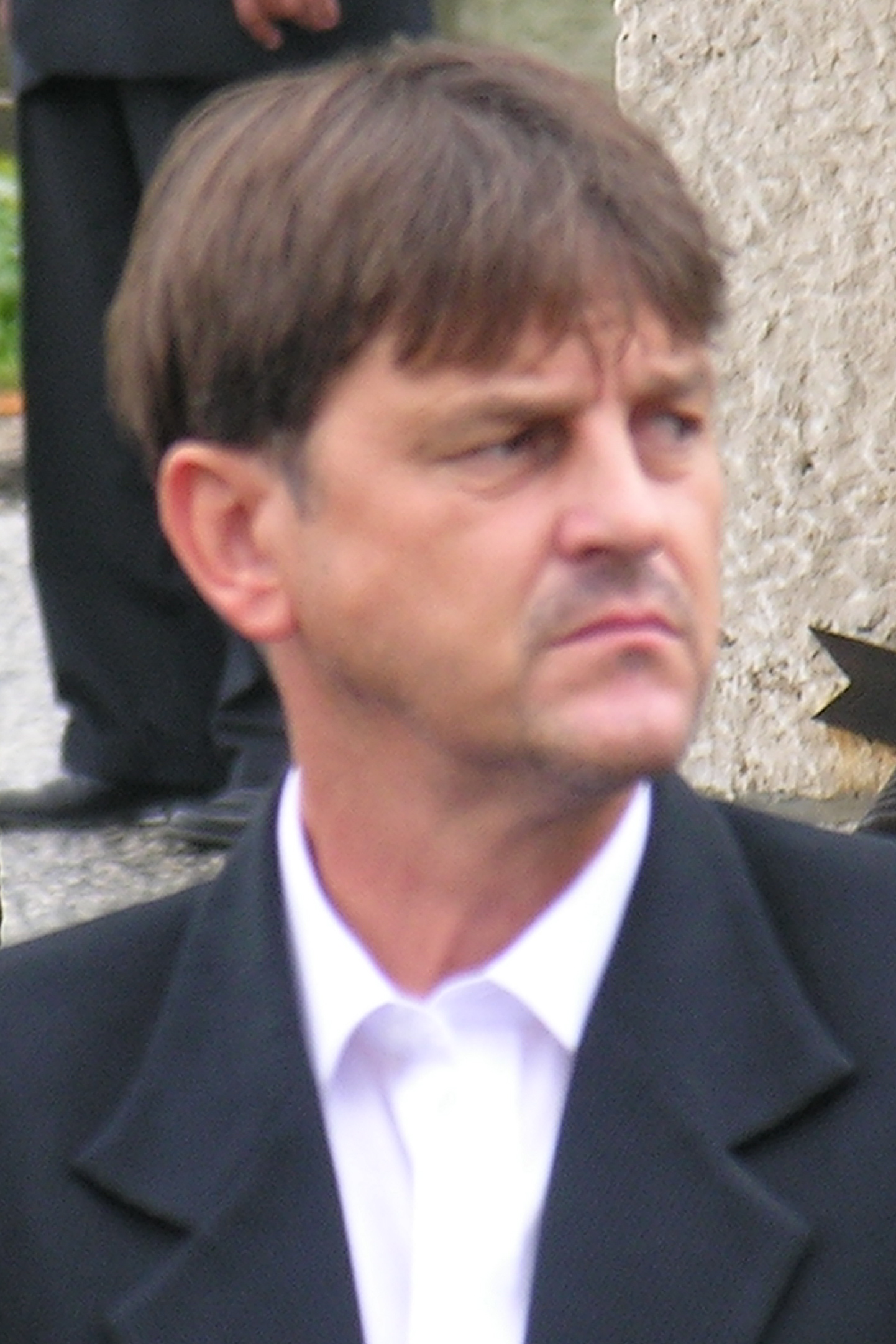

Personal information
- Date of birth: 4 February 1967 (age 59)
- Place of birth: Szolnok, Hungary
- Position: Right-back

Team information
- Current team: BVSC (manager)

Senior career*
Years	Team	Apps	(Gls)
1984–1988	Szolnok		
1988–1994	Kispest	146	(2)
1994–1996	BVSC	43	(1)
1996–1997	Hapoel Kfar Saba	28	(1)
1997	MTK Budapest	7	(0)
1998–2000	Kispest	45	(0)
Total		269	(4)

International career
1993–1995	Hungary	10	(0)

Managerial career
- 2001: Szolnok
- 2001–2002: Rákospalota
- 2002: Vasas (assistant)
- 2003: MTK Budapest II
- 2004–2006: Vecsés
- 2006: Vecsés (technical director)
- 2006–2007: Velence
- 2007–2008: Budapest Honvéd II
- 2008–2009: Budapest Honvéd (assistant)
- 2009: Budapest Honvéd (caretaker)
- 2009–2010: Budapest Honvéd (assistant)
- 2010–2013: Hungary (assistant)
- 2013: Hungary (caretaker)
- 2013: Hungary U-21 (caretaker)
- 2014: Nyíregyháza
- 2014–2015: Budapest Honvéd
- 2015–2016: Szolnok
- 2016–2023: Szolnok (sporting director)
- 2019–2021: Szolnok
- 2023–2024: Kazincbarcika
- 2024–: BVSC
- * Club domestic league appearances and goals

József Csábi (born 14 February 1967) is a Hungarian football manager and former player who is the manager of BVSC. He was formerly the interim head coach of the national team of Hungary for one match in 2013, following the dismissal of Sándor Egervári. As a player, Csábi played as a defender.

== Managerial career ==
On 16 February 2023, Csábi was appointed as manager of newly promoted Nemzeti Bajnokság II side Kazincbarcika. The team he took over in the second half of the season finished 14th, and the following season the team finished 10th. He left the club by mutual agreement on 1 June 2024.

He moved to second division BVSC on 10 June 2024, where he previously played in the club's most successful years.

== Managerial statistics ==
Managerial record by team and tenure
Team	From	To	Record					Ref.
Team	From	To	P	W	D	L	Win %	Ref.
Kazincbarcika	20 February 2023	1 June 2024	50	18	13	19	36.00	
Total			50	18	13	19	36.00	
