= Attila Baumgartner =

Hungarian football player

Personal information
- Full name: Attila Baumgartner
- Date of birth: 13 June 1977 (age 49)
- Place of birth: Körmend, Hungary
- Height: 1.80 m (5 ft 11 in)
- Position: Midfielder

Team information
- Current team: Gyirmot SE

Senior career*
Years	Team	Apps	(Gls)
1996–1998	Szombathelyi Haladás	49	(2)
1998–2003	Győri ETO FC	123	(15)
2003–2004	FC Sopron	17	(2)
2004–2005	Pécsi MFC	12	(1)
2005–2007	Integrál-DAC	26	(6)
2007–	Gyirmót SE	64	(11)

International career
1998–2000	Hungary U-21	4	(0)
- * Club domestic league appearances and goals

Attila Baumgartner (born 13 June 1977 in Körmend) is a Hungarian football (midfielder) player who currently plays for Gyirmót SE.
