= Zsolt Páling =

Hungarian footballer (born 1969)

Personal information
- Date of birth: 16 February 1969 (age 57)
- Place of birth: Budapest, Hungary
- Height: 1.77 m (5 ft 10 in)
- Position: Midfielder

Senior career*
Years	Team	Apps	(Gls)
1988–1999	Ferencváros	166	(14)
1997	→ III. Kerület (loan)	9	(0)
1999–2000	Diósgyőr	10	(0)
2000	Rákospalota	18	(4)
2000	Vác	15	(4)
2000–2001	Budafok	2	(0)
2001	Dabas	15	(5)
2001–2002	Siófok	16	(0)
2002	Dabas	8	(0)
2002–2003	Tura	4	(0)
Total		263	(27)

International career
1992	Hungary	2	(0)
- * Club domestic league appearances and goals

Zsolt Páling (born 16 February 1969) is a Hungarian former professional footballer who played as a midfielder. He was a squad member for the 1985 FIFA World Youth Championship and was capped for Hungary.

== Career ==
Páling appeared in the 1989 Magyar Kupa final against Honvéd which Ferencváros lost 1–0.

== Career statistics ==
=== Club ===
Appearances and goals by club, season and competition
Club	Season	League			Magyar Kupa		Europe		Other		Total	
Club	Season	Division	Apps	Goals	Apps	Goals	Apps	Goals	Apps	Goals	Apps	Goals
Ferencváros	1988–89	Nemzeti Bajnokság I	10	2			1 (Note: Appearance in Mitropa Cup)	0	—		11	2
Ferencváros	1989–90	Nemzeti Bajnokság I	13	2			4 (Note: Appearances in European Cup Winners' Cup)	0	—		17	2
Ferencváros	1990–91	Nemzeti Bajnokság I	13	1			2 (Note: Appearances in UEFA Cup)	0	—		15	1
Ferencváros	1991–92	Nemzeti Bajnokság I	20	1			4	0	—		24	1
Ferencváros	1992–93	Nemzeti Bajnokság I	26	3	9	0	2 (Note: Appearances in UEFA Champions League)	0	1 (Note: Appearance in Szuperkupa)	0	38	3
Ferencváros	1993–94	Nemzeti Bajnokság I	19	0	7	1	2	0	—		28	1
Ferencváros	1994–95	Nemzeti Bajnokság I	18	3	9	3	2	2	1	1	30	9
Ferencváros	1995–96	Nemzeti Bajnokság I	15	1	4	0	4	0	—		23	1
Ferencváros	1996–97	Nemzeti Bajnokság I	11	0	2	0	3 (Note: One appearance in UEFA Champions League, two appearances in UEFA Cup)	0	—		16	0
Ferencváros	1997–98	Nemzeti Bajnokság I	21	1	1	0	6	0	—		28	1
Ferencváros	1998–99	Nemzeti Bajnokság I	—		—		—		—		—	
Ferencváros	Total		166	14	32	4	30	2	2	1	230	21
III. Kerület (loan)	1996–97	Nemzeti Bajnokság I	9	0	2	0	—		—		11	0
Diósgyőr	1999–2000	Nemzeti Bajnokság I	10	0	3	0	—		—		13	0
Rákospalota	1999–2000	Nemzeti Bajnokság II	18	4	—		—		—		18	4
Vác	2000–01	Nemzeti Bajnokság III	15	4	2	0	—		—		17	4
Budafok	2000–01	Nemzeti Bajnokság III	2	0	—		—		—		2	0
Dabas	2000–01	Nemzeti Bajnokság III	15	5	—		—		—		15	5
Siófok	2001–02	Nemzeti Bajnokság II	16	0	2	1	—		—		18	1
Dabas	2001–02	Nemzeti Bajnokság III	8	0	—		—		—		8	0
Tura	2002–03	Nemzeti Bajnokság III	4	0	—		—		—		4	0
Career total			263	27	41	5	30	2	2	1	336	35

=== International ===
Appearances and goals by national team and year
National team	Year	Apps	Goals
Hungary	1992	2	0
Total		2	0

== Honours ==
Ferencváros

- Nemzeti Bajnokság I: 1991–92, 1994–95, 1995–96
- Magyar Kupa: 1990–91, 1992–93, 1993–94, 1994–95; runner-up: 1988–89
- Szuperkupa: 1994, 1995; runner-up: 1992

Siófok

- Nemzeti Bajnokság II – West: 2001–02
