= Ferenc Szaszovszky =

Hungarian footballer

Personal information
- Full name: Ferenc Szaszovszky
- Date of birth: 17 October 1973 (age 53)
- Place of birth: Budapest, Hungary
- Height: 1.80 m (5 ft 11 in)
- Position: Defender

Team information
- Current team: BVSC Budapest

Senior career*
Years	Team	Apps	(Gls)
1996–1998	Pécsi MFC	26	(1)
1998–2000	BVSC Budapest	31	(3)
- * Club domestic league appearances and goals

Ferenc Szaszovszky (born 17 October 1973 in Budapest) is a Hungarian football player who currently plays for BVSC Budapest.
