= Rott (Ammersee) =

River in Germany

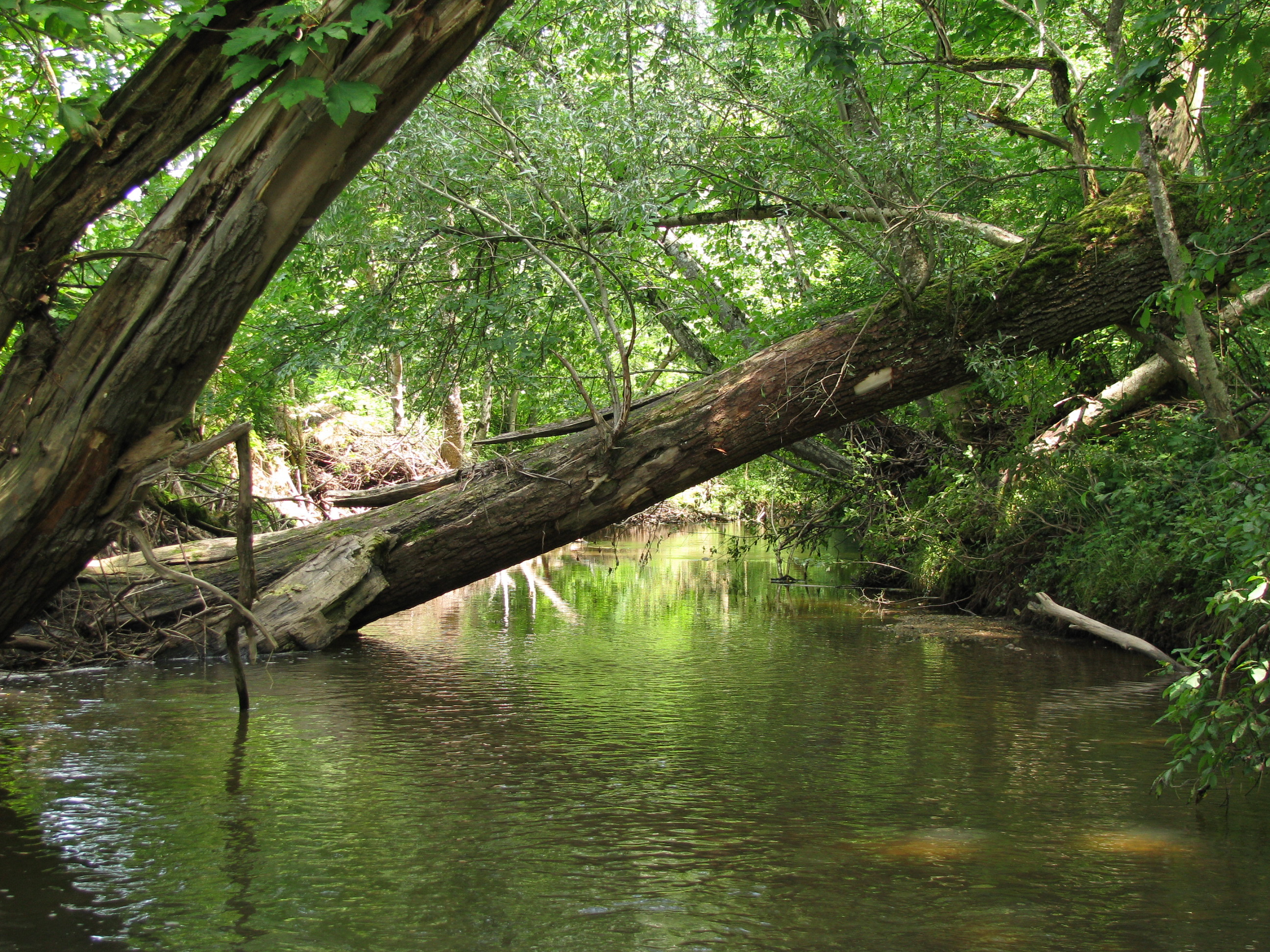
- The Rott at Stillern (borough of Raisting), looking downstream

Location
- Country: Germany
- State: Bavaria

Physical characteristics
- Mouth
  - location: Ammersee
  - coordinates: 47.9509°N 11.1230°E
- Length: 18.7 km (11.6 mi)

Basin features
- Progression: Amper→ Isar→ Danube→ Black Sea

Rott (German pronunciation: [ʁɔt]) is a river of Bavaria, Germany. It flows into the Ammersee, which is drained by the Amper, near Dießen am Ammersee.

== See also ==
- List of rivers of Bavaria
