= Zsolt Füzesi =

Hungarian footballer

Personal information
- Full name: Zsolt Füzesi
- Date of birth: 23 January 1977 (age 49)
- Place of birth: Budapest, Hungary
- Height: 1.80 m (5 ft 11 in)
- Position: Forward

Team information
- Current team: BVSC Budapest

Senior career*
Years	Team	Apps	(Gls)
1997–1998	Stadler FC	2	(0)
1998–1999	BVSC Budapest	4	(0)
1999–2000	FC Tatabánya	8	(1)
- * Club domestic league appearances and goals

Zsolt Füzesi (born 23 January 1977) is a Hungarian football player who currently plays for FC Tatabánya.
