= Ishtvan Shandor =

Ukrainian football player and coach (born 1944)

Ishtvan Sandor
Personal information
- Full name: Ishtvan Jorovich Sandor
- Date of birth: 19 August 1944 (age 82)
- Place of birth: Csepe, Zakarpattia Ukraine
- Height: 1.75 m (5 ft 9 in)
- Position: Midfielder

Senior career*
Years	Team	Apps	(Gls)
1966	Polissya Zhytomyr	36	(0)
1967–1969	Avtomobilist	64	(6)
1970	Spartak Sumy	?	(1)
1970	Avtomobilist	9	(0)
1971	Spartak Sumy	?	(4)
1972–1973	Frunzenets	?	(9)

Managerial career
- 197?–1978: Hoverla Uzhhorod
- 1981: Prykarpattia
- 1984–1987: Zakarpattia
- 1988–1989: Zirka Kropyvnytskyi
- 1989–1992: Nyíregyháza
- 1992–1993: Diósgyőr
- * Club domestic league appearances and goals as of 1973

Ishtvan Jorovich Shandor (Hungarian: Sándor István; Ukrainian: Іштван Дьордьович Шандор; born 19 August 1944) is a Ukrainian former football player and coach of Hungarian origin. He was awarded the honorary title of the Master of Sports of the USSR.

== Biography ==
He started playing football in his youth in his native Zakarpattia Oblast. In 1966 he was invited to the “Polissya” team (Zhytomyr). In 1970 he played for Spartak, Sumy for a short time. After the end of his professional career as a football player, he was appointed as a coach of Hoverla (Uzhhorod), which then played in the second league of the USSR Football Championship (197? -1978).

He became an assistant of the second league team Spartak (Ivano-Frankivsk) in 1979. In 1981 he was the head coach of Spartak, which was then called "Prykarpattia" and played in the first league, served on the teams of Bukovina (Chernivsky) (1982–1983), Zakarpattia Uzhhorod (1984–1987) and Zirka Kirovohrad (1988–1989).

After settling in Hungary, he was the coach of Nyíregyháza, Diósgyőr and then Stadler. He became a MTK player observer in 1998. He led the BVSC team in the second half of the year. He has been leading the Csongrád team since the summer of 1999. He held this position until June 2001, when he became the coach of Nyíregyháza again.
