= Csaba Szakos =

Hungarian footballer

Personal information
- Full name: Csaba Szakos
- Date of birth: 3 July 1975 (age 51)
- Place of birth: Miskolc, Hungary
- Height: 1.82 m (6 ft 0 in)
- Position: Defender

Team information
- Current team: BVSC Budapest

Senior career*
Years	Team	Apps	(Gls)
1998–1999	BVSC Budapest	12	(0)
- * Club domestic league appearances and goals

Csaba Szakos (born 3 July 1975 in Miskolc) is a Hungarian football player who has played for BVSC Budapest and Diósgyőri VTK.
