= Zoltán Molnár (footballer, born 1971) =

Hungarian footballer

Personal information
- Full name: Zoltán Molnár
- Date of birth: 19 January 1971 (age 55)
- Place of birth: Kisvárda, Hungary
- Height: 1.81 m (5 ft 11 in)
- Position: Midfielder

Team information
- Current team: BVSC Budapest

Senior career*
Years	Team	Apps	(Gls)
1992–1994	Nyíregyháza Spartacus	30	(0)
1994–1998	Stadler FC	108	(2)
1998	BVSC Budapest	11	(0)
1999–2001	Kiskőrösi FC	36	(2)
- * Club domestic league appearances and goals

Zoltán Molnár (born 9 January 1971 in Kisvárda) is a Hungarian football player who currently plays for BVSC Budapest.
