= József Tajti =

Hungarian footballer (1943–2025)

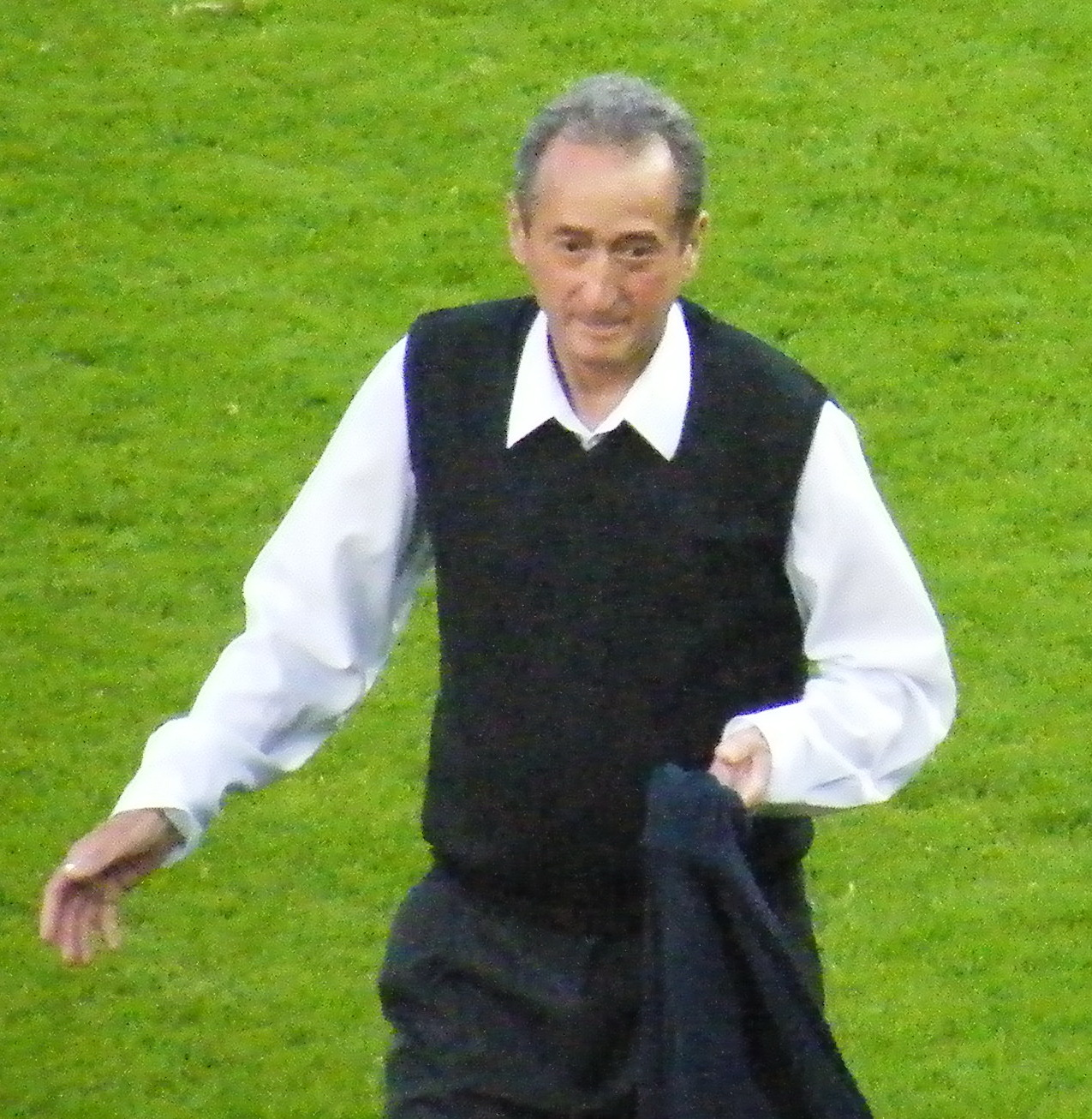

Personal information
- Date of birth: 8 October 1943
- Place of birth: Jászapáti, Hungary
- Date of death: 29 June 2025 (aged 81)
- Height: 1.80 m (5 ft 11 in)
- Position: Defender

Senior career*
Years	Team	Apps	(Gls)
1960–1963	Pénzügyőr SE		
1963–1965	Kaposvár		
1965–1974	Budapest Honvéd		
Total		135	(0)

Managerial career
- 1975–1986: Budapest Honvéd
- 1986–1987: Fehérvár FC
- 1988–1989: Hungary youth
- 1990–1992: Csepel SC
- 1993–1996: Dunaújváros FC
- 1997–1999: BVSC Budapest
- * Club domestic league appearances and goals

József Tajti (8 October 1943 – 29 June 2025) was a Hungarian football player and manager.

== Background ==
Tajti was born in Jászapáti on 8 October 1943.

His son is currently employed by Diósgyőri VTK. His grandson, Mátyás Tajti, plays for Zalaegerszeg. He also defended his son when Bernd Storck did not select him for the U19 squad. He died on 29 June 2025, at the age of 81.

== Sources ==
- Ki kicsoda a magyar sportéletben? [Who's Who in the Hungarian Sports Life?], Volume 3 (S–Z). Szekszárd, Babits Kiadó, 1995, p 85, ISBN 963-495-014-0
