= Myroslav Reshko =

Ukrainian footballer

Personal information
- Full name: Myroslav Pavlovych Reshko
- Date of birth: 18 August 1970 (age 56)
- Place of birth: Mukachevo, Ukrainian SSR, Soviet Union
- Height: 1.80 m (5 ft 11 in)
- Position: Defender

Youth career
- 1988–1991: SKA Lviv

Senior career*
| Years | Team | Apps | (Gls) |
| 1991 | Pryladyst Mukacheve | | |
| 1992–1994 | Karpaty Mukacheve | | |
| 1994–1998 | Stadler FC | 97 | (6) |
| 1998–1999 | BVSC Budapest | 15 | (1) |
- * Club domestic league appearances and goals

Myroslav Pavlovych Reshko (Ukrainian: Мирослав Павлович Решко; born 18 August 1970, in Mukachevo) is a Ukrainian football player who played for BVSC Budapest.
