= Budapesti VSC =

Sports club in Hungary

BVSC-Zugló
- Full name: Budapesti Vasutas Sport Club-Zugló Közhasznú Egyesület
- Short name: BVSC-Zugló
- Founded: 1911; 115 years ago
- Ground: Szőnyi úti Stadion, Budapest
- Capacity: 12,000
- Owner: Kristóf Szatmáry
- Manager: József Csábi
- League: NB II
- 2025–26: NB II, 7th of 16
- Website: http://www.bvsc.hu/
Home colours	Away colours

Budapesti Vasutas Sport Club-Zugló commonly known as BVSC-Zugló is a professional football club based in Zugló, Budapest, Hungary, that competes in the Nemzeti Bajnokság II. The club was founded in 1911. Its football section became closed in 2001, but has now reopened, while other sections that are still operational are table tennis, wrestling, water polo. The table tennis department won the European Cup of 1980 and several national championships.

The football team reached in the years 1996 and 1997 twice the Hungarian Cup final and was runner up in the national championship in 1996.

== History ==
On 18 July 2012, BVSC started an adult team after 10 years of pause. The team are going to compete in the Budapest Labdarugó Szövetség IV.

In 2019, the club were promoted to the Budapest bajnokság I after winning the 2018-19 Budapest bajnokság II.

In May 2020, the club were promoted to the Nemzeti Bajnokság III after finishing first in the Budapest championship. The 2019-20 Budapest Bajnokság I was interrupted and finally terminated due to the COVID-19 pandemic. Gábor Horváth, director of the football department, said that the club were eligible to enter the 2020-21 Nemzeti Bajnokság III and the club would meet all the requirements to play at the third tier.

On 28 July 2021, former Hungarian national team player, Ákos Buzsáky, was appointed. The main aim of the club was to get promoted to Nemzeti Bajnokság II.

In the 2020-21 Nemzeti Bajnokság III season, the club finished second.

In March 2022, the club announced that refugees from the Russo-Ukrainian War can do sports for free at the club.

On 1 June 2022, Ákos Buzsáky was removed from his position.

On 22 June 2022, Flórián Urbán was appointed as the new manager of the club.

In 2022–23, BVSC-Zugló finished 1st in NB III East and promotion to NB II for the first time in history in 20 years via promotion relegation play-off after defeat Szentlőrinc 1-2 and play in second tier since 2003–04.

On 9 April 2023, BVSC beat Körösladány 8–0. On 16 April 2023, BVSC beat Putnok by 3-0 and won the 2022–23 Nemzeti Bajnokság III season.

On 2 August 2023, Paulo Vinicius, former Fehérvár FC pleayer, was signed by the club.

On 30 November 2023, Tamás Szekeres was appointed as the new coach of the club.

In the 2023–24 Nemzeti Bajnokság II season, BVSC were struggling to avoid relegation. However, the club had surprising results such as beating Győri ETO FC 1–0 at home on 4 February 2024.

On 24 April 2024, Tamás Szekeres resigned and was replaced by Ádám Kincses. On 28 April 2024, it was announced that István Kisteleki also helps the management of the team. In the 2023–24 Nemzeti Bajnokság II, BVSC finished in the 13th position and avoided relegation the third tier.

On 10 June 2024, József Csábi was appointed as the manager of the club. BVSC started the 2024–25 Nemzeti Bajnokság II season with a goalless draw against Mezőkövesdi SE at the Mezőkövesdi Városi Stadion on 28 July 2024. The draw was followed by two away victories. First, BVSC beat Aqvital FC Csákvár on 4 August 2024. On 11 August 2024, BVSC beat Kazincbarcikai SC 1-0.

== Name changes ==
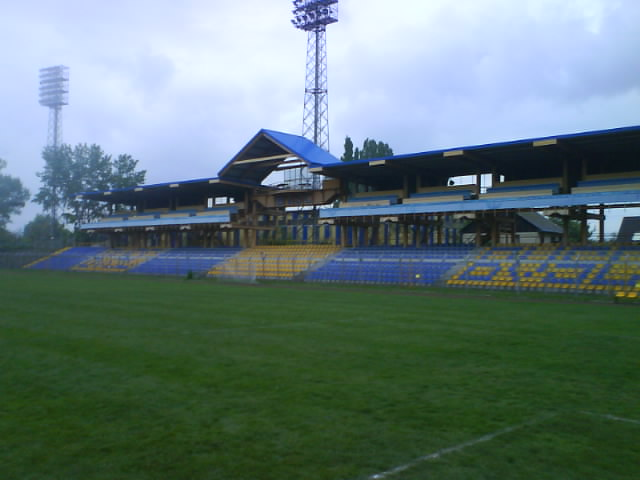
Szőnyi úti Stadion

As most other Hungarian sports clubs BVSC was subject to numerous changes of its name throughout its history. Here is a list of names that were in use by the club:

- 1911–1945 MAVOSZ Budapesti VSC
- 1945–? Vasutas Előre SC (after merger with Budapesti MÁV Előre)
- ?–1948 MÁV Konzum Vasutas Előre
- 1948–1954 Budapesti Lokomotív SK
- 1954–1956 Budapesti Törekvés SE (after merger with Budapesti Előre SK and Budapesti Postás SK)
- 1956–1990 Budapesti VSC (after demerger of Budapesti Előre SK and Budapesti Postás SK)
- 1990–1991 BVSC-Mávtransped
- 1992–1992 BVSC-Novép
- 1992–1996 BVSC-Dreher
- 1996–1997 Budapesti VSC
- 1997–1998 BVSC-Zugló FC
- 1998–1999 BVSC-Zugló
- 1999–2001 Budapesti VSC
- 2001–2011 BVSC-Zugló FC
- 2011– BVSC-Zugló

== Players ==
=== Current squad ===
As of 20 February 2026

Note: Flags indicate national team as defined under FIFA eligibility rules; some limited exceptions apply. Players may hold more than one non-FIFA nationality.

No.	Pos.	Nation	Player
1	GK	HUN	Gábor Megyeri
4	DF	HUN	Levente Babós (on loan from Újpest)
6	MF	HUN	Keve Tóth
7	FW	HUN	Péter Törőcsik
9	FW	HUN	Patrik Bacsa
10	MF	HUN	Patrik Kelemen
12	GK	HUN	Zsombor Petroff
13	MF	ROU	Krisztián Székely
15	DF	HUN	Norbert Benkő-Bíró
16	FW	HUN	Balázs Farkas (on loan from Győr ETO)
17	DF	UKR	Ivan Anistratenko
19	MF	HUN	Marcell Nemes

No.	Pos.	Nation	Player}
20	MF	HUN	Gergő Ominger (on loan from Puskás Akadémia)
22	MF	HUN	Kornél Csernik
24	MF	HUN	Adrián Dénes (on loan from Újpest)
25	DF	HUN	Ákos Király
40	MF	HUN	Máté Katona
55	MF	HUN	Roland Lehoczky
70	FW	HUN	László Pekár
77	FW	HUN	Kristóf Sarkadi
82	FW	HUN	Szabolcs Horváth
88	MF	HUN	Martin Palincsár
90	DF	HUN	Paulo Vinícius
95	DF	UKR	Ihor Blyznyuk (on loan from Kisvárda)

== Non-playing staff ==
=== Management ===
Position	Name
President	Kristóf Szatmáry
Vice-president	Sándor Tóth
Managing director	Gábor Szentpáli

== Honours ==
=== League ===
- Nemzeti Bajnokság I:
  - Runners-up (1): 1995–96
- Nemzeti Bajnokság II:
  - Winners (3): 1942–43, 1957–58, 1990–91
- Nemzeti Bajnokság III:
  - Winners (3): 1969, 1974–75, 2022–23

=== Cup ===
- Magyar Kupa:
  - Runners-up (2): 1995–96, 1996–97

== Seasons ==
=== League positions ===
As of 26 July 2025

- Between 1999–00 and 2000–01 the second tier league called NB I/B.
- Between 2001–02 and 2002–03 the fourth tier league called NB III.
- In 2003–04 the third tier league called NB II.

== Managers ==
- (Hungary) Péter Szabó (1951–1952)
- (Hungary) Béla Kállói (1953)
- (Hungary) István Baráth (1953–1954)
- (Hungary) Tivadar Király (1954)
- (Hungary) László Fenyvesi (1955–1957)
- (Hungary) László Balogh (1957)
- (Hungary) Ede Moór (1957–1960)
- (Hungary) Gábor Kiss (1960–1961)
- (Hungary) Jenő Stahl (1961)
- (Hungary) László Fenyvesi (1961–1962)
- (Hungary) László Keszei (1962–1963)
- (Hungary) János Gyarmati (1964–1968)
- (Hungary) Ferenc Szigeti (1969–1970)
- (Hungary) Béla Marosvári (1970–1973)
- (Hungary) György Mezey (1973–1977)
- (Hungary) Mihály Vasas (1977)
- (Hungary) Mihály Ubrankovics (1978–1981)
- (Hungary) András Borbély (1981–1982)
- (Hungary) Antal Szentmihályi (1982–1983)
- (Hungary) László Halácsi (1983–1985)
- (Hungary) József Farkas (1985–1986)
- (Hungary) József Both (1987–1988)
- (Hungary) István Kisteleki (1988–1992)
- (Hungary) József Both (1992–1993)
- (Hungary) Imre Garaba (1993)
- (Hungary) Sándor Egervári (1993–1996)
- (Hungary) László Dajka (1996–1997)
- (Hungary) György Mezey (1997)
- (Hungary) György Bognár (1997–1998)
- (Hungary) István Sándor (1998)
- (Socialist Federal Republic of Yugoslavia) Dragan Sekulić (1999)
- (Hungary) József Tajti (1999)
- (Hungary) Tibor Simon (1999–2001)
- (Hungary) József Dzurják (2001–2002)
- (Hungary) Tamás Futó (2003–2004)
- there were no professional team (2004–2012)
- (Hungary) András Hernády (2013–2015)
- (Hungary) Ákos Balogh (2015–2017)
- (Hungary) László Varga (2017–2018)
- (Hungary) Gabala Krisztián (2018–2020)
- (Hungary) Ákos Buzsáky (2021–2022)
- (Hungary) Flórián Urbán (?-2023)
- (Hungary) Tamás Szekeres (30 November 2023 – 26 April 2024)
- (Hungary) Ádám Kincses and István Kisteleki (27 April 2024 - 9 June 2024)
- (Hungary) József Csábi (10 June 2024-15 Jume 2025)
- (Serbia) Dragan Vukmir (16 June 2025 – present)

== Transfers ==
=== In ===
#	Pos	Player	From	Fee	Date
#	GK	(Hungary) Gábor Nagy	Stadler FC	Free	Summer 1998
#	DF	(Hungary) János Kertész	Stadler FC	Free	Summer 1998
#	DF	(Hungary) Tibor Pomper	Ferencvárosi TC	Loan Return	Summer 1998
#	DF	(Ukraine) Miroslav Resko	Stadler FC	Free	Summer 1998
#	DF	(Hungary) Csaba Szakos	Miskolci VSC	Undisclosed	Summer 1998
#	DF	(Hungary) Ferenc Szaszovszky	Pécsi MFC	Undisclosed	Summer 1998
#	DF	(Hungary) Zoltán Vincze	Stadler FC	Free	Summer 1998
#	MF	(Federal Republic of Yugoslavia) Djordje Bajic	FK Radnički Niš	Undisclosed	Summer 1998
#	MF	(Ukraine) Viktor Brovcenko	PFC Nyva Vinnytsia	Undisclosed	Summer 1998
#	MF	(Hungary) Zoltán Molnár	Stadler FC	Free	Summer 1998
#	MF	(Hungary) Attila Polonkai	Szeged LC	Loan Return	Summer 1998
#	FW	(Hungary) Zsolt Füzesi	Stadler FC	Free	Summer 1998
#	FW	(Hungary) Szabolcs Szegletes	Veszprémi LC	Undisclosed	Summer 1998

== In Europe ==
Season	Competition	Round	Country	Club	Home	Away	Aggregate
1996–97	UEFA Cup	Qualifying Round	(Wales)	Barry Town FC	3–1	1–3	4–4(p)
1997–98	UEFA Cup Winners' Cup	Qualifying Round	(Liechtenstein)	FC Balzers	2–0	3–1	5–1
		1. Round	(Spain)	Real Betis	0–2	0–2	0–4

== Record by country of opposition ==
- Correct as of 5 July 2010

Country	Pld	W	D	L	GF	GA	GD	Win%
Liechtenstein	2	2	0	0	5	1	+4	100.00
Spain	2	0	0	2	0	4	−4	0.00
Wales	2	1	0	1	4	4	+0	50.00
Totals	6	3	0	3	9	9	0	50.00

P – Played; W – Won; D – Drawn; L – Lost

== Notable members in other sports ==
- Gábor Gergely, table tennis world champion
- Ferenc Kiss, wrestler, coach with BVSC
- László Schell, ice hockey referee, former player
