= 1996–97 MTK FC season =

MTK
1996–97 season
- Chairman: Gábor Várszegi
- Manager: József Garami
- Stadium: Hungária körúti Stadion (Home stadium); Népstadion (Note: The match against Ferencváros in the Nemzeti Bajnokság I was played at the Népstadion in Budapest, instead of MTK regular stadium, the Hungária körúti Stadion.) (Temporary stadium)
- Nemzeti Bajnokság I: 1st
- Magyar Kupa: Winners
- Highest home attendance: 8,000 v Vasas (8 March 1997, Nemzeti Bajnokság I)
- Lowest home attendance: 500 v Budafok (2 October 1996, Magyar Kupa)
- Average home league attendance: 2,912
- Biggest win: 8–1 v Fonyód (Away, 27 July 1996, Magyar Kupa)
- Biggest defeat: 0–1 v BVSC (Home, 23 November 1996, Nemzeti Bajnokság I); 2–3 v Vác (Away, 23 April 1997, Magyar Kupa)

The 1996–97 season was Magyar Testgyakorlók Köre Football Club's 88th competitive season, 2nd consecutive season in the Nemzeti Bajnokság I and 92nd season in existence as a football club. In addition to the domestic league, MTK participated in that season's editions of the Magyar Kupa.

== Squad ==
Players with league appearances

Note: Flags indicate national team as defined under FIFA eligibility rules; some limited exceptions apply. Players may hold more than one non-FIFA nationality.

No.	Pos.	Nation	Player
—	GK	HUN	Gábor Babos
—	MF	HUN	Ákos Barva
—	FW	HUN	Aurél Csertői
—	MF	HUN	Krisztián Csillag
—	MF	HUN	Gábor Egressy
—	MF	HUN	László Farkasházy
—	FW	HUN	Antal Füle
—	MF	HUN	Gábor Halmai
—	FW	HUN	István Hamar
—	MF	HUN	Csaba Horváth
—	MF	HUN	Béla Illés
—	MF	HUN	Imre Katzenbach

No.	Pos.	Nation	Player
—	FW	HUN	Krisztián Kenesei
—	DF	HUN	Attila Kuttor
—	DF	HUN	Emil Lőrincz
—	DF	HUN	Zoltán Molnár
—	DF	ROU	Adrian Oprișan
—	FW	HUN	Ferenc Orosz
—	FW	HUN	Sándor Preisinger
—	GK	HUN	Balázs Rabóczki
—	DF	HUN	Tamás Szekeres
—	DF	HUN	János Talapa
—	MF	HUN	Tamás Zimmermann
—	MF	HUN	Gyula Zsivóczky

== Competitions ==
=== Overview ===
Competition	First match	Last match	Starting round	Final position	Record							
Competition	First match	Last match	Starting round	Final position	Pld	W	D	L	GF	GA	GD	Win %
Nemzeti Bajnokság I	10 August 1996	28 May 1997	Matchday 1	Winners	34	26	7	1	87	25	+62	76.47
Magyar Kupa	27 July 1996	11 June 1997	Group stage	Winners	13	11	1	1	41	8	+33	84.62
Total					47	37	8	2	128	33	+95	78.72

Source: Competitions

=== Nemzeti Bajnokság I ===
==== League table ====
Pos	Team	Pld	W	D	L	GF	GA	GD	Pts	Qualification or relegation
1	MTK Hungária (C)	34	26	7	1	87	25	+62	85	Qualification for Champions League first qualifying round
2	Újpest	34	23	7	4	75	35	+40	76	Qualification for UEFA Cup first qualifying round
3	Ferencváros	34	22	8	4	69	37	+32	74	Qualification for UEFA Cup first qualifying round
4	Vasas	34	19	7	8	50	33	+17	64	Qualification for Intertoto Cup group stage
5	Debrecen	34	14	10	10	55	38	+17	52	

Source: rsssf.com
(C) Champions

==== Results summary ====
Overall								Home						Away					
Pld	W	D	L	GF	GA	GD	Pts	W	D	L	GF	GA	GD	W	D	L	GF	GA	GD
34	26	7	1	87	25	+62	85	14	2	1	43	11	+32	12	5	0	44	14	+30

Source: Matches

==== Matches ====
10 August 1996 1	MTK	2–0	Videoton	Budapest
19:00 CEST (UTC+2)	Farkasházy 8'; E. Lőrincz 54' (pen.); Csillag (yellow card) 62'; Halmai (yellow card) 70'	Report	A. Tóth (yellow card) 16'; A. Lőrincz (yellow card) 33'; Bekő (yellow card) 34'; D. Váczi (yellow card) 54'; Korsós (yellow card) 56'	Stadium: Hungária körúti Stadion; Attendance: 2,000; Referee: Ferenc Bede; Assistant referees: Kurmai, Nyilas

19 August 1996 2	Vasas	1–2	MTK	Budapest
16:00 CEST (UTC+2)	Z. Váczi (yellow card) 46', (goal) 70'; Grytsayuk (yellow card) 61'	Report	Halmai (yellow card) 8'; Farkasházy 12'; Kenesei 22'	Stadium: Fáy utcai Stadion; Attendance: 3,500; Referee: Sándor Márton; Assistant referees: Monár, Hrabovszky

24 August 1996 3	MTK	3–0	Ferencváros	Budapest
17:00 CEST (UTC+2)	Kenesei 5', 89'; Zimmermann (yellow card) 55'; Orosz 68'	Report	Miriuță (yellow card) 49'	Stadium: Népstadion; Attendance: 3,000; Referee: Sándor Varga; Assistant referees: Z. Szabó, Tompos

4 September 1996 4	Pécs	1–3	MTK	Pécs
16:30 CEST (UTC+2)	Schneider (yellow card) 45'; Tököli (red card) 62'; Szabados (yellow card) 71'; Azoiței 87' (pen.)	Report	Kenesei 8'; C. Horváth (yellow card) 52' (yellow-red card); Orosz 70'; Zsivóczky (yellow card) 78'; E. Lőrincz (yellow card) 86'	Stadium: Stadion PMFC; Attendance: 5,000; Referee: Ferenc Lettrich; Assistant referees: B. Kiss, A. Szabó

7 September 1996 5	MTK	2–1	Újpest	Budapest
19:00 CEST (UTC+2)	Halmai 26'; Kenesei 52'; E. Lőrincz (yellow card) 63'	Report	Füzesi (yellow card) 30'; Bérczy 64'	Stadium: Hungária körúti Stadion; Attendance: 5,000; Referee: István Vad; Assistant referees: Kincses, L. Molnár

15 September 1996 6	Debrecen	1–4	MTK	Debrecen
11:00 CEST (UTC+2)	Ilea 40' (pen.); Frida (red card) 42'; Z. Pető (yellow card) 67'	Report	Szekeres 26', (yellow card) 47'; Halmai (yellow card) 37'; C. Horváth (yellow card) 39'; E. Lőrincz (yellow card) 55'; Zsivóczky 60'; Kenesei 71', 82'	Stadium: Oláh Gábor utcai Stadion; Attendance: 8,000; Referee: Sándor Puhl; Assistant referees: Hajdó, Birincsik

18 September 1996 7	MTK	4–0	Győr	Budapest
18:00 CEST (UTC+2)	B. Illés 19'; Farkasházy 39'; Szekeres (yellow card) 46'; Preisinger 55'; Oprișan (yellow card) 64'; Talapa 90'	Report		Stadium: Hungária körúti Stadion; Attendance: 2,500; Referee: László Vágner

22 September 1996 8	III. Kerület	2–7	MTK	Budapest
14:30 CEST (UTC+2)	Földvári (yellow card) 17' (yellow-red card) 32'; Szamosi 25'; Krecska (yellow card) 45'; A. Szabó 80'	Report	B. Illés 22', 61', 86', 90'; Zsivóczky (yellow card) 24', (goal) 30'; Szekeres (yellow card) 37'; Kenesei 46', 84'	Stadium: Hévízi úti Stadion; Attendance: 7,000; Referee: László Cserna; Assistant referees: Hanacsek, Hajdó

28 September 1996 9	MTK	1–0	Zalaegerszeg	Budapest
19:00 CEST (UTC+2)	Z. Molnár II (yellow card) 30'; Csertői (yellow card) 65'; E. Lőrincz 71' (pen.)	Report	Somfalvi (yellow card) 36'; Csóka (yellow card) 71'; Z. Szabó I (yellow card) 90'	Stadium: Hungária körúti Stadion; Attendance: 2,000; Referee: Tibor Kincses; Assistant referees: Z. Szabó, Hrabovszky

13 October 1996 10	Siófok	0–3	MTK	Siófok
17:00 CEST (UTC+2)	László (yellow card) 22'; Kolovics (yellow card) 39'; Bimbó (yellow card) 65'	Report	Z. Molnár II (yellow card) 9'; B. Illés 26', 87'; Katzenbach (yellow card) 54'; Zsivóczky 59'	Stadium: Révész Géza utcai Stadion; Attendance: 3,500; Referee: Tamás Arany; Assistant referees: Hamar, Dr. Bozóky

20 October 1996 11	MTK	2–0	Kispest-Honvéd	Budapest
11:00 CEST (UTC+2)	Halmai (yellow card) 19'; C. Horváth 21'; Farkasházy (yellow card) 45'; Csertői 51'	Report	Piroska (yellow card) 35'; Dubecz (yellow card) 48'; Mih. Tóth (yellow card) 69'	Stadium: Hungária körúti Stadion; Attendance: 3,000; Referee: Sándor Varga; Assistant referees: Márton, L. Molnár

27 October 1996 12	MTK	3–1	Békéscsaba	Budapest
14:30 CET (UTC+1)	Csertői 6'; Z. Molnár II (yellow card) 35'; Füle 40'; B. Illés 57'; Szekeres (yellow card) 66'; Oprișan (yellow card) 75'	Report	N. Illés (yellow card) 16'; Csehi 35' (pen.)	Stadium: Hungária körúti Stadion; Attendance: 2,500; Referee: László Vágner; Assistant referees: Tompos, Hidasi

2 November 1996 13	Vác	1–4	MTK	Vác
15:00 CET (UTC+1)	Boda (yellow card) 29'; Vámosi 38'; Vojtekovszki (yellow card) 53' (yellow-red card) 79'; P. Kovács (yellow card) 61'	Report	B. Illés 27', 54' (pen.); Talapa (yellow card) 32'; Csertői 60', 80'	Stadium: Ligeti Stadion; Attendance: 3,000; Referee: Béla Kiss; Assistant referees: Bede, Kaibás

13 November 1996 14	MTK	5–2	Csepel	Budapest
17:00 CET (UTC+1)	B. Illés 4', 63'; Farkasházy 18'; Zsivóczky 25'; Halmai 58'	Report	Semsei (yellow card) 8'; Petrók 20', 28'; Keresztúri (yellow card) 26'; Baranyi (yellow card) 50'; A. Varga (yellow card) 57'	Stadium: Hungária körúti Stadion; Attendance: 2,000; Referee: István Vad; Assistant referees: Nyilas, Koch

16 November 1996 15	Stadler	1–2	MTK	Akasztó
13:00 CET (UTC+1)	Eremeev (yellow card) 27' (yellow-red card) 45'; Kertész (yellow card) 29'; Deme (yellow card) 30'; Lehota (yellow card) 31'; Mikóczi 58' (pen.)	Report	B. Illés 32' (pen.), 76', (yellow card) 36'; Z. Molnár II (yellow card) 58'	Stadium: Stadler Stadion; Attendance: 500; Referee: László Cserna; Assistant referees: Ábrahám, Tompos

23 November 1996 16	MTK	0–1	BVSC	Budapest
17:00 CET (UTC+1)	Oprișan (yellow card) 88'	Report	Z. Fehér (yellow card) 16'; Erős 37'; Füzi (yellow card) 39'; Egressy (yellow card) 76'	Stadium: Hungária körúti Stadion; Attendance: 3,000; Referee: Sándor Puhl; Assistant referees: Hamar, Dr. Bozóky

2 December 1996 17	Haladás	0–0	MTK	Szombathely
19:00 CET (UTC+1)	Szekér (yellow card) 1'; Mik. Tóth (yellow card) 34'; Zugor (yellow card) 76'	Report	C. Horváth (yellow card) 18'; Zimmermann (yellow card) 78'	Stadium: Rohonci út Attendance: 4,000; Referee: Attila Juhos; Assistant referees: Fodor, Tompos

1 March 1997 18	Videoton	1–3	MTK	Székesfehérvár
17:00 CET (UTC+1)	A. Lőrincz (yellow card) 32'; Dulic (yellow card) 71'; Vancsa 75'; Bekő (yellow card) 85'; T. Pető (red card) 85'	Report	Kenesei 9'; B. Illés 14'; E. Lőrincz 48' (pen.); Z. Molnár II (yellow card) 70'; Halmai (yellow card) 78'; Szekeres (yellow card) 85'	Stadium: Sóstói Stadion; Attendance: 8,000; Referee: Attila Juhos; Assistant referees: Mohácsi, Koch

8 March 1997 19	MTK	2–0	Vasas	Budapest
17:00 CET (UTC+1)	Szekeres 15'; Zsivóczky (yellow card) 56'; Halmai (yellow card) 72'; B. Illés 76'	Report	Máriási (yellow card) 44'	Stadium: Hungária körúti Stadion; Attendance: 8,000; Referee: István Vad; Assistant referees: Arany, Nyilas

14 March 1997 20	Ferencváros	1–1	MTK	Budapest
18:00 CET (UTC+1)	Nyilas 48' (pen.), (yellow card) 67'; Nychenko (yellow card) 79'	Report	Kenesei (yellow card) 27'; B. Illés 37'; Babos (yellow card) 47'; Preisinger (yellow card) 75'	Stadium: Üllői úti Stadion; Attendance: 17,000; Referee: Sándor Puhl; Assistant referees: Hamar, Dr. Bozóky

22 March 1997 21	MTK	6–0	Pécs	Budapest
17:00 CET (UTC+1)	Orosz 19', 30', 63'; Csertői 21'; E. Lőrincz 34'; Kuttor 41'	Report	Brindas (yellow card) 43'	Stadium: Hungária körúti Stadion; Attendance: 1,500; Referee: László Molnár; Assistant referees: Bukovics, Zvolenszky

26 March 1997 22	Újpest	0–2	MTK	Budapest
17:00 CET (UTC+1)	Véber (yellow card) 8'; Tamási (yellow card) 67'	Report	Talapa (yellow card) 17'; Csertői 52', (yellow card) 73'; B. Illés (yellow card) 74'; Kenesei 86'	Stadium: Megyeri úti stadion Attendance: 8,000; Referee: Sándor Piller; Assistant referees: T. Arany, Koch

29 March 1997 23	MTK	1–0	Debrecen	Budapest
17:00 CEST (UTC+2)	Farkasházy 16'; Halmai (yellow card) 21'; Csillag (yellow card) 56'; Orosz (yellow card) 62'	Report	Stupar (yellow card) 39'; Vadicska (yellow card) 88'	Stadium: Hungária körúti Stadion; Attendance: 2,500; Referee: László Vágner; Assistant referees: G. Kiss, Tompos

5 April 1997 24	Győr	0–3	MTK	Győr
17:00 CEST (UTC+2)	Balea (yellow card) 14'	Report	Orosz 4'; Z. Molnár II (yellow card) 7'; Szekeres 27'; B. Illés 32'	Stadium: Stadion ETO; Attendance: 2,500; Referee: Attila Juhos; Assistant referees: Kaibás, Bajkai

12 April 1997 25	MTK	2–1	III. Kerület	Budapest
19:00 CEST (UTC+2)	Zsivóczky 9'; Farkasházy 33'; Kuttor (yellow card) 57'; Halmai (yellow card) 71'; Talapa (yellow card) 86'	Report	Gáspár (yellow card) 53'; Gyura 70'	Stadium: Hungária körúti Stadion; Attendance: 2,000; Referee: Zoltán Kurmai; Assistant referees: Bede, Zvolenszky

16 April 1997 26	Zalaegerszeg	3–3	MTK	Zalaegerszeg
19:00 CEST (UTC+2)	Z. Balog I (yellow card) 25'; Csóka (yellow card) 27'; T. Németh 57'; Szőke 72'; B. Molnár 86'; Z. Szabó II (red card) 90+2'	Report	E. Lőrincz 34'; Orosz 59'; B. Illés (yellow card) 66'; Farkasházy (yellow card) 80'; Csertői 90+1'	Stadium: ZTE Stadion; Attendance: 10,000; Referee: László Cserna; Assistant referees: Tompos, Hosszú

19 April 1997 27	MTK	0–0	Siófok	Budapest
19:00 CEST (UTC+2)	Szekeres (yellow card) 90+1'	Report	B. Kovács (yellow card) 9'	Stadium: Hungária körúti Stadion; Attendance: 2,500; Referee: Sándor Varga; Assistant referees: Hajdó, Kincses

3 May 1997 28	Kispest-Honvéd	2–2	MTK	Budapest
17:00 CEST (UTC+2)	Dubecz 45'; M. Plókai 81'; Hungler (yellow card) 84'	Report	Kenesei 51', 56', (yellow card) 60'	Stadium: Bozsik József Stadion; Attendance: 3,000; Referee: István Vad; Assistant referees: Arany, Nyilas

7 May 1997 29	Békéscsaba	0–0	MTK	Békéscsaba
17:00 CEST (UTC+2)	Todorović (yellow card) 24'; Stoica (red card) 45'	Report	C. Horváth (yellow card) 66'; Farkasházy (yellow card) 90+1'	Stadium: Kórház utcai Stadion; Attendance: 6,000; Referee: Sándor Puhl; Assistant referees: Birincsik, Márta

11 May 1997 30	MTK	3–0	Vác	Budapest
14:30 CEST (UTC+2)	Halmai 29'; E. Lőrincz (yellow card) 48'; B. Illés 55'; Zsivóczky 74'	Report	Boda (yellow card) 69'	Stadium: Hungária körúti Stadion; Attendance: 2,000; Referee: Ferenc Bede; Assistant referees: Kormai, Mező

14 May 1997 31	Csepel	0–3	MTK	Budapest
17:00 CEST (UTC+2)	Ta. Nagy (yellow card) 29'; Tyukodi (yellow card) 65'; A. Varga (yellow card) 76'; J. Németh (yellow card) 80'	Report	C. Horváth (yellow card) 37'; Kenesei (yellow card) 49'; Csertői 56'; Farkasházy 62'; Z. Molnár II (yellow card) 75'; H. Rósa 78' (o.g.)	Stadium: Béke téri Stadion; Attendance: 1,000; Referee: Ferenc Lettrich; Assistant referees: Cserna, Mohácsi

17 May 1997 32	MTK	5–3	Stadler	Budapest
17:00 CEST (UTC+2)	B. Illés 14', 17', 78'; Csertői 34'; Farkasházy (yellow card) 60', (goal) 72'	Report	Hleba 46'; Schultz (yellow card) 66'; Vachilya (yellow card) 74' (yellow-red card) 90'; Eremeev 77', 83'	Stadium: Hungária körúti Stadion; Attendance: 3,000; Referee: Attila Hanacsek; Assistant referees: G. Kiss, Z. Szabó

24 May 1997 33	BVSC	0–2	MTK	Budapest
17:00 CEST (UTC+2)	Bondarenko (yellow card) 30'	Report	Z. Molnár II (yellow card) 19'; B. Illés 73'; Kuttor 85'	Stadium: Szőnyi úti Stadion; Attendance: 1,500; Referee: Attila Juhos; Assistant referees: O. Horváth, Tompos

28 May 1997 34	MTK	2–2	Haladás	Budapest
17:00 CEST (UTC+2)	Orosz 6'; Kenesei 49'	Report	Mik. Tóth 21'; Koller (yellow card) 39'; S. Kovács 42'	Stadium: Hungária körúti Stadion; Attendance: 3,000; Referee: Sándor Varga; Assistant referees: A. Szabó, Hrabovszky

=== Magyar Kupa ===
==== Group stage ====
Pos	Team	Pld	W	D	L	GF	GA	GD	Pts	Qualification	MTK	CSA	NAG	FON
1	MTK	3	3	0	0	14	1	+13	9	Advance to knockout phase	—			
2	Csákvár	3	2	0	1	7	8	−1	6	Advance to knockout phase	0–5	—	3–2	
3	Nagykanizsa	3	1	0	2	14	6	+8	3		0–1		—	
4	Fonyód	3	0	0	3	4	24	−20	0		1–8	1–4	2–12	—

27 July 1996 1	Fonyód	1–8	MTK	Fonyód
17:00 CEST (UTC+2)	Palkovics 7'	Report	Csertői 27'; Kenesei 29', 30'; Füle 40'; Zsivóczky 85', 90' (pen.); Hamar 88'; Csillag 89'	Stadium: József utcai Atlétikai Pálya; Attendance: 1,500; Referee: Vavika

31 July 1996 2	Csákvár	0–5	MTK	Csákvár
17:00 CEST (UTC+2)		Report	Orosz 8', 59'; Hamar 62'; Kenesei 64'; Talapa 75'	Stadium: Csákvári Sportpálya; Attendance: 1,300; Referee: Ákos

3 August 1996 3	Nagykanizsa	0–1	MTK	Nagykanizsa
17:00 CEST (UTC+2)			Kenesei	Stadium: Olajbányász Sporttelep; Attendance: 500; Referee: László Cserna

==== Knockout phase ====
===== Round of 32 =====
2 October 1996 First leg	MTK	2–0	Budafok	Budapest
17:00 CEST (UTC+2)	Csertői (yellow card) 1'; Preisinger (yellow card) 38', (goal) 50'; Szekeres (yellow card) 54'; Kuttor 58'; E. Lőrincz (yellow card) 84'	Report	Sztanó (yellow card) 31'; M'bemba (yellow card) 46'	Stadium: Hungária körúti Stadion; Attendance: 500; Referee: Ferenc Lettrich; Assistant referees: I. Nagy, Tamássy

23 October 1996 Second leg	Budafok	1–2 (1–4 agg.)	MTK	Budapest
13:30 CEST (UTC+2)	M'bemba (yellow card) 12'; Földes 72'	Report	Szekeres (yellow card) 42'; Farkasházy 45'; Halmai 77'	Stadium: Promontor utcai Stadion; Attendance: 600; Referee: Tamás Arany; Assistant referees: Koch, I. Nagy
Note: MTK won 4–1 on aggregate.

===== Round of 16 =====
20 November 1996 First leg	MTK	2–2	Újpest	Budapest
17:00 CET (UTC+1)	Preisinger (yellow card) 15'; Zsivóczky (yellow card) 35'; Kuttor 70'; Csillag 77'; Oprișan (yellow card) 82'; Z. Molnár II (yellow card) 90+1'	Report	Véber (yellow card) 34'; Zombori (yellow card) 76'; Herczeg 80'; Bérczy 90'	Stadium: Hungária körúti Stadion; Attendance: 4,000; Referee: László Molnár; Assistant referees: Herbály, Gyarmati

27 November 1996 Second leg	Újpest	0–1 (2–3 agg.)	MTK	Budapest
17:00 CET (UTC+1)	C. Fehér (yellow card) 58'; Szlezák (yellow card) 86'	Report	Zsivóczky 31', (yellow card) 57'; B. Illés (yellow card) 82'; Kuttor (yellow card) 90+2'	Stadium: Megyeri úti stadion Attendance: 4,000; Referee: Ferenc Bede; Assistant referees: Mohácsi, Kaibás
Note: MTK won 3–2 on aggregate.

===== Quarter-finals =====
5 March 1997 First leg	III. Kerület	1–2	MTK	Budapest
14:30 CET (UTC+1)	Z. Molnár II 29' (o.g.); Novák (yellow card) 70'	Report	Orosz 27', 80'; Z. Molnár II (yellow card) 40'; Farkasházy (yellow card) 69'; Zimmermann (yellow card) 77'	Stadium: Hévízi úti Stadion; Attendance: 4,000; Referee: Sándor Márton; Assistant referees: A. Szabó, Kaibás

11 March 1997 Second leg	MTK	4–0 (6–1 agg.)	III. Kerület	Budapest
17:00 CET (UTC+1)	Farkasházy 24'; Preisinger 26', 38'; Szekeres 68'	Report		Stadium: Hungária körúti Stadion; Attendance: 1,500; Referee: Béla Kiss; Assistant referees: Mező, L. Varga
Note: MTK won 6–1 on aggregate.

===== Semi-finals =====
8 April 1997 First leg	MTK	4–0	Vác	Budapest
19:00 CEST (UTC+2)	Zsivóczky 18'; B. Illés 21', 47'; E. Lőrincz 26' (pen.)	Report	Nyikos (yellow card) 37'; Kriska (yellow card) 61'	Stadium: Hungária körúti Stadion; Attendance: 2,000; Referee: Sándor Márton; Assistant referees: A. Szabó, Tamássy

23 April 1997 Second leg	Vác	3–2 (3–6 agg.)	MTK	Vác
18:00 CEST (UTC+2)	Kasza 48'; Andrași 56'; P. Horváth 82'	Report	Halmai 8'; Egressy 12'; Z. Molnár II (yellow card) 60'; E. Lőrincz (yellow card) 61'	Stadium: Ligeti Stadion; Attendance: 1,000; Referee: László Molnár; Assistant referees: Szökrény, Gyarmati
Note: MTK won 6–3 on aggregate.

===== Final =====
21 May 1997 First leg	MTK	6–0	BVSC	Budapest
19:00 CEST (UTC+2)	Halmai 12'; Erős 28' (o.g.); B. Illés 33'; Orosz 36'; Kenesei 66'; E. Lőrincz 83' (pen.)	Report	Komlósi (yellow card) 31'	Stadium: Hungária körúti Stadion; Attendance: 2,000; Referee: László Molnár; Assistant referees: Gyarmati, Zvolenszky

11 June 1997 Second leg	BVSC	0–2 (0–8 agg.)	MTK	Budapest
19:00 CEST (UTC+2)	I. Kiss (yellow card) 21'; Csiszár (yellow card) 69'; Szokai (yellow card) 85'	Report	Z. Molnár II (yellow card) 40'; Orosz 58', 73'	Stadium: Szőnyi úti Stadion; Attendance: 1,000; Referee: Sándor Puhl; Assistant referees: Koch, Mező
Note: MTK won 8–0 on aggregate.
