= 1998–99 MTK Hungária FC season =

MTK
1998–99 season
- Manager: Sándor Egervári
- Stadium: Hungária körúti Stadion
- Nemzeti Bajnokság I: 1st
- Magyar Kupa: Round of 16
- UEFA Cup Winners' Cup: First round
- Highest home attendance: 7,000 v Győr (28 November 1998, Nemzeti Bajnokság I)
- Lowest home attendance: 1,000 (multiple matches)
- Average home league attendance: 3,647
- Biggest win: 7–0 v GÍ Gøta (Home, 27 August 1998, UEFA Cup Winners' Cup)
- Biggest defeat: 0–2 v Ried (Away, 17 September 1998, UEFA Cup Winners' Cup); 2–4 v Haladás (Home, 24 April 1999, Nemzeti Bajnokság I); 1–3 v Debrecen (Away, 29 May 1999, Nemzeti Bajnokság I)

The 1998–99 season was Magyar Testgyakorlók Köre Hungária Football Club's 90th competitive season, 4th consecutive season in the Nemzeti Bajnokság I and 94th season in existence as a football club. In addition to the domestic league, MTK participated in that season's editions of the Magyar Kupa and the UEFA Cup Winners' Cup.

== Squad ==
Players with league appearances

Note: Flags indicate national team as defined under FIFA eligibility rules; some limited exceptions apply. Players may hold more than one non-FIFA nationality.

No.	Pos.	Nation	Player
—	DF	HUN	Ádám Babos
—	GK	HUN	Gábor Babos
—	FW	HUN	Iván Balaskó
—	FW	HUN	Csaba Csordás
—	FW	HUN	Péter Czvitkovics
—	DF	HUN	Norbert Elek
—	MF	HUN	Károly Erős
—	DF	HUN	Viktor Farkas
—	MF	BRA	Giba
—	MF	HUN	Gábor Halmai
—	MF	HUN	Béla Illés
—	FW	HUN	Krisztián Kenesei
—	FW	HUN	Péter Kincses
—	DF	HUN	Ádám Komlósi

No.	Pos.	Nation	Player
—	DF	HUN	Gábor Korolovszky
—	FW	HUN	Károly Kovacsics
—	MF	HUN	József Kozma
—	FW	HUN	Mihály Lipcsei
—	DF	HUN	Emil Lőrincz
—	MF	HUN	Csaba Madar
—	MF	HUN	Zoltán Molnár
—	FW	HUN	Ferenc Orosz
—	FW	HUN	Sándor Preisinger
—	GK	HUN	Balázs Rabóczki
—	DF	HUN	Tamás Szamosi
—	DF	HUN	István Szekér
—	DF	HUN	Tamás Szekeres

== Competitions ==
=== Overview ===
Competition	First match	Last match	Starting round	Final position	Record							
Competition	First match	Last match	Starting round	Final position	Pld	W	D	L	GF	GA	GD	Win %
Nemzeti Bajnokság I	25 July 1998	16 June 1999	Matchday 1	Winners	34	27	2	5	77	26	+51	79.41
Magyar Kupa	28 October 1998	11 November 1998	Round of 32	Round of 16	2	1	0	1	4	3	+1	50.00
UEFA Cup Winners' Cup	13 August 1998	1 October 1998	Qualifying round	First round	4	2	0	2	10	4	+6	50.00
Total					40	30	2	8	91	33	+58	75.00

Source: Competitions

=== Nemzeti Bajnokság I ===
==== League table ====
Pos	Team	Pld	W	D	L	GF	GA	GD	Pts	Qualification or relegation
1	MTK Hungária (C)	34	27	2	5	77	26	+51	83	Qualification for Champions League first qualifying round
2	Ferencváros	34	19	7	8	61	40	+21	64	Qualification for UEFA Cup qualifying round
3	Újpest	34	20	3	11	58	40	+18	63	Qualification for UEFA Cup qualifying round
4	Győr	34	16	11	7	53	39	+14	59	
5	Dunaferr	34	17	6	11	54	46	+8	57	

Source: soccerway.com
Rules for classification: 1st points; 2nd goal difference; 3rd goals scored; 4th overall wins.
(C) Champions

==== Results summary ====
Overall								Home						Away					
Pld	W	D	L	GF	GA	GD	Pts	W	D	L	GF	GA	GD	W	D	L	GF	GA	GD
34	27	2	5	77	26	+51	83	15	0	2	43	12	+31	12	2	3	34	14	+20

==== Results by round ====
Round	1	2	3	4	5	6	7	8	9	10	11	12	13	14	15	16	17	18	19	20	21	22	23	24	25	26	27	28	29	30	31	32	33	34
Ground	A	H	A	H	A	H	A	H	A	H	A	A	H	A	H	A	H	H	A	H	A	H	A	H	A	H	A	H	H	A	H	A	H	A
Result	W	W	D	W	W	W	W	W	L	W	D	W	W	W	L	W	W	W	W	W	W	W	W	W	W	L	W	W	W	W	W	L	W	L
Position	7	3	3	2	1	1	1	1	1	1	1	1	1	1	1	1	1	1	1	1	1	1	1	1	1	1	1	1	1	1	1	1	1	1
Points	3	6	7	10	13	16	19	22	22	25	26	29	32	35	35	38	41	44	47	50	53	56	59	62	65	65	68	71	74	77	80	80	83	83

A = Away; H = Home; W = Win; D = Draw; L = Loss

==== Matches ====
25 July 1998 1	Zalaegerszeg	0–1	MTK	Zalaegerszeg
19:00 CEST (UTC+2)	Szőke (yellow card) 17'; Kocsárdi (yellow card) 54'	Report	Szamosi (yellow card) 18'; Halmai (yellow card) 24'; Orosz 32'; Erős (yellow card) 89'	Stadium: ZTE Stadion; Attendance: 12,000; Referee: Attila Ábrahám; Assistant referees: Balajti, Georgiou; Fourth official: Z. Szarka

1 August 1998 2	MTK	3–1	Vác	Budapest
19:00 CEST (UTC+2)	Halmai (yellow card) 21'; Illés 28', 45', 86', (yellow card) 48'; Balaskó (yellow card) 81'	Report	Vojtekovszki 19'; P. Kovács (yellow card) 69' (yellow-red card) 74'; Romanek (yellow card) 90+1'	Stadium: Hungária körúti Stadion; Attendance: 2,000; Referee: István Hanyecz; Assistant referees: Hrabovszky, Vámos

7 August 1998 3	Ferencváros	2–2	MTK	Budapest
20:30 CEST (UTC+2)	M. Lendvai (yellow card) 35'; O. Vincze (yellow card) 41' (yellow-red card) 90'; Nyilas 74' (pen.); Mátyus (yellow card) 80'; R. Nagy (yellow card) 86'; Bükszegi 88'	Report	Kenesei 5'; Halmai 24'; Z. Molnár (yellow card) 25' (yellow-red card) 58'; Erős (yellow card) 87'	Stadium: Üllői úti Stadion; Attendance: 9,000; Referee: László Vágner; Assistant referees: Dr. Bozóky, Tompos

16 August 1998 4	MTK	2–1	Videoton	Budapest
19:00 CEST (UTC+2)	Preisinger 17'; Illés 80'	Report	Lukács 73'	Stadium: Hungária körúti Stadion; Attendance: 4,000; Referee: Attila Hanacsek; Assistant referees: L. Varga, Bajkai

22 August 1998 5	Nyírség-Spartacus	1–3	MTK	Nyíregyháza
17:00 CEST (UTC+2)	Kiss (yellow card) 26'; Cap (red card) 45'; Kirchmayer 76'	Report	Szekeres 43'; Preisinger (red card) 45'; Erős (yellow card) 52'; Illés 60', 85'	Stadium: Városi Stadion; Attendance: 11,000; Referee: Attila Juhos; Assistant referees: Kispál, Ravánszky

30 August 1998 6	MTK	3–0	Dunaferr	Budapest
19:00 CEST (UTC+2)	Illés 3', (yellow card); Kenesei 30', 70'	Report	Lengyel (yellow card); Jäkl (yellow card)	Stadium: Hungária körúti Stadion; Attendance: 5,000; Referee: Zoltán Kurmai

12 September 1998 7	Vasas	0–4	MTK	Budapest
19:00 CEST (UTC+2)	A. Tóth (yellow card) 13'; Váczi (yellow card) 26'; Végh (red card) 35'	Report	Balaskó 1', 22'; Illés 36' (pen.); Szekeres (yellow card) 45'; Kenesei 52'; Korolovszky (yellow card) 90'	Stadium: Fáy utcai Stadion; Attendance: 7,000; Referee: Attila Hajdó; Assistant referees: Nyilas, Z. Szabó

21 September 1998 8	MTK	3–0	Kispest-Honvéd	Budapest
19:00 CEST (UTC+2)	Szekeres 33'; Orosz 61'; Halmai (yellow card) 88'; Kenesei 90'	Report	Tarlue (yellow card) 10'; Pintér (yellow card) 51'; Hungler (yellow card) 55'; Plókai (yellow card) 82'	Stadium: Hungária körúti Stadion; Attendance: 5,000; Referee: József Bukovics; Assistant referees: Zvolenszky, Fridély

26 September 1998 9	Haladás	2–1	MTK	Szombathely
18:00 CEST (UTC+2)	Kocsis 1'; Balog 6'; Zugor (yellow card) 9'; K. Varga (yellow card) 68'	Report	Illés 61'; Szekeres (yellow card) 71'	Stadium: Rohonci út Attendance: 5,000; Referee: Tamás Arany; Assistant referees: Csorba, Radvánszky

4 October 1998 10	MTK	5–0	III. Kerület	Budapest
19:00 CEST (UTC+2)	Illés 9', 80' (pen.); L. Varga 19' (o.g.); Z. Molnár (yellow card) 38'; Preisinger 61'; Kecskés 74' (o.g.); Komlósi (yellow card) 83'	Report	P. Lendvai (yellow card) 50'; Kecskés (yellow card) 79'; Kun (yellow card) 90+1'	Stadium: Hungária körúti Stadion; Attendance: 2,000; Referee: János Megyebíró; Assistant referees: O. Horváth, P. Kovács

17 October 1998 11	Diósgyőr	1–1	MTK	Miskolc
14:30 CEST (UTC+2)	Földvári (yellow card) 8' (yellow-red card) 18'; Smiljanić 14'	Report	Madar 44'; Balaskó (yellow card) 58'; Komlósi (yellow card) 60'	Stadium: Diósgyőri Stadion; Attendance: 18,000; Referee: László Vágner; Assistant referees: Tompos, Vámos

25 October 1998 12	Gázszer	1–3	MTK	Akasztó
17:00 CET (UTC+1)	Z. Salacz (yellow card) 17'; Korol (yellow card) 45'; Tiber 55'; Földes (yellow card) 58'; Árki (yellow card) 72'; Szalai (yellow card) 76'	Report	Illés 23'; Erős (yellow card) 26'; Z. Molnár (yellow card) 53'; Madar (yellow card) 72', (goal) 75'; Kenesei 81'	Stadium: Stadler Stadion; Attendance: 1,500; Referee: Vencel Tóth; Assistant referees: L. Varga, Bajkai

31 October 1998 13	MTK	1–0	Siófok	Budapest
18:00 CET (UTC+1)	Kenesei 36'; Szekeres (yellow card) 50'; Erős (yellow card) 60'	Report	Pest (yellow card) 26'; Juhász (yellow card) 88'	Stadium: Hungária körúti Stadion; Attendance: 2,000; Referee: László Cserna; Assistant referees: Gyarmati, Georgiou

8 November 1998 14	BVSC-Zugló	0–2	MTK	Budapest
17:00 CET (UTC+1)	Szaszovszky (yellow card) 36'; Füzi (yellow card) 53'; Bondarenko (yellow card) 55'; Z. Vincze (yellow card) 65'	Report	Erős (yellow card) 37'; Balaskó 41', 45'; Szamosi (yellow card) 41'; Z. Molnár (yellow card) 42'; Lőrincz (yellow card) 61'	Stadium: Szőnyi úti Stadion; Attendance: 2,000; Referee: Zoltán Kurmai; Assistant referees: Zvolenszky, Fridély

14 November 1998 15	MTK	1–2	Debrecen	Budapest
18:00 CET (UTC+1)	Madar (yellow card) 70'; Balaskó 85'	Report	Sabo 12', (yellow card) 20'; Vadicska (yellow card) 38'; Pető (yellow card) 45'; Bodnár (yellow card) 58'; Ilea 78'	Stadium: Hungária körúti Stadion; Attendance: 2,000; Referee: Zoltán Szarka; Assistant referees: Boda, Dr. Szabó

21 November 1998 16	Újpest	1–2	MTK	Budapest
13:00 CET (UTC+1)	V. Sebők 48', (yellow card) 67'; Kiskapusi (yellow card) 58'; Z. Kovács (yellow card) 78'; Herczeg (yellow card) 78'	Report	Preisinger 20'; Kenesei (yellow card) 35', (goal) 88'; Madar (yellow card) 49'; Erős (yellow card) 74'	Stadium: Megyeri úti stadion Attendance: 4,000; Referee: László Vágner; Assistant referees: Tomos, L. Varga

28 November 1998 17	MTK	4–1	Győr	Budapest
17:00 CET (UTC+1)	Z. Molnár (yellow card) 19'; Erős 28', (yellow card) 73'; Preisinger 37', (yellow card) 65'; Kenesei 78'; Illés 82'	Report	Korsós (yellow card) 21'; Stark (yellow card) 30'; Somogyi (yellow card) 38'; Lazăr 58'; Lakos (yellow card) 79'	Stadium: Hungária körúti Stadion; Attendance: 7,000; Referee: Attila Hajdó; Assistant referees: Hrabovszky, Bócsik

27 February 1999 18	MTK	2–1	Zalaegerszeg	Budapest
17:00 CET (UTC+1)	Z. Molnár (yellow card) 22'; Illés 29' (pen.); Kenesei 35', (yellow card) 72'	Report	Caşolţan 9'; Strasser (yellow card) 29'; Z. Szabó II (yellow card) 77'; Kocsárdi (yellow card) 84'	Stadium: Hungária körúti Stadion; Attendance: 4,000; Referee: Tamás Arany; Assistant referees: Hrabovszky, Bócsik

6 March 1999 19	Vác	1–2	MTK	Vác
17:00 CET (UTC+1)	Romanek 21'; Kriska (yellow card) 62'	Report	Preisinger 14'; Erős (yellow card) 50'; Komlósi (yellow card) 73'; Z. Molnár (yellow card) 87'; T. Nagy 88' (o.g.)	Stadium: Ligeti Stadion; Attendance: 4,000; Referee: Attila Ábrahám; Assistant referees: Balajti, Georgiou

13 March 1999 20	MTK	2–0	Ferencváros	Budapest
16:30 CET (UTC+1)	Halmai (yellow card) 23'; Kenesei 41'; Illés (yellow card) 45'; Madar 82'	Report	Szűcs (yellow card) 2'; Udvarácz (yellow card) 13'; N. Nagy (yellow card) 30'; Selimi (yellow card) 36'	Stadium: Hungária körúti Stadion; Attendance: 5,000; Referee: Attila Hanacsek; Assistant referees: Mező, Tompos

20 March 1999 21	Videoton	0–1	MTK	Székesfehérvár
16:35 CET (UTC+1)		Report	Filipović 38' (o.g.); Szamosi (yellow card) 42'	Stadium: Sóstói Stadion; Attendance: 3,000; Referee: Géza Kiss; Assistant referees: P. Kovács, Tumó

3 April 1999 22	MTK	2–0	Nyírség-Spartacus	Budapest
19:00 CEST (UTC+2)	Kenesei 56'; Halmai 84'	Report	Kondora (yellow card) 48'	Stadium: Hungária körúti Stadion; Attendance: 4,000; Referee: Zoltán Szarka; Assistant referees: Boda, Dr. P. Szabó

7 April 1999 23	Dunaferr	0–3	MTK	Dunaújváros
16:00 CEST (UTC+2)		Report	Preisinger 33', 51'; Madar (yellow card) 43'; Orosz 77'	Stadium: Dunaújvárosi Stadion; Attendance: 4,000; Referee: Attila Ábrahám; Assistant referees: Balajti, Georgiou

10 April 1999 24	MTK	2–0	Vasas	Budapest
19:00 CEST (UTC+2)	Szekér 9', (yellow card) 89'; Komlósi (yellow card) 23'; Halmai 44'	Report	Grytsayuk (yellow card) 19'; Pál (yellow card) 57'; Váczi (yellow card) 89'	Stadium: Hungária körúti Stadion; Attendance: 6,000; Referee: László Cserna; Assistant referees: Koch, G. Kiss

17 April 1999 25	Kispest-Honvéd	0–2	MTK	Budapest
17:00 CEST (UTC+2)	Plókai (yellow card) 4'; Borgulya (yellow card) 41'; Hungler (yellow card) 49'	Report	Komlósi (yellow card) 14'; Illés 18', 85'; Balaskó (yellow card) 88'	Stadium: Bozsik József Stadion; Attendance: 2,000; Referee: Attila Hajdó; Assistant referees: Tompos, Z. Szabó

24 April 1999 26	MTK	2–4	Haladás	Budapest
19:00 CEST (UTC+2)	Z. Molnár (yellow card) 29' (yellow-red card) 83'; Szamosi (yellow card) 52'; Preisinger 63', 89', (yellow card) 73'; Halmai (yellow card) 80'	Report	Horváth 13'; S. Kovács 48'; C. Nagy (yellow card) 70'; Balog (yellow card) 73'; Takács (yellow card) 76'; P. Tóth 80'; Bonchiş 84'	Stadium: Hungária körúti Stadion; Attendance: 3,000; Referee: Géza Kiss; Assistant referees: Sápi, Székely

2 May 1999 27	III. Kerület	1–5	MTK	Budapest
15:00 CEST (UTC+2)	Kilik (yellow card) 13'; P. Lendvai 39'	Report	Madar (yellow card) 19'; Lőrincz 50'; Orosz 58', 62', 73'; Illés 86'	Stadium: Hévízi úti Stadion; Attendance: 2,000; Referee: Vencel Tóth; Assistant referees: Z. Szarka, J. Molnár

5 May 1999 28	MTK	4–0	Diósgyőr	Budapest
17:00 CEST (UTC+2)	Illés 13', 82'; Preisinger 75', 89'	Report		Stadium: Hungária körúti Stadion; Attendance: 2,000; Referee: Attila Hanacsek; Assistant referees: Cserna, Gyarmati

8 May 1999 29	MTK	2–0	Gázszer	Budapest
19:00 CEST (UTC+2)	Illés 2' (pen.); Madar (yellow card) 23'; Orosz 44'	Report	J. Salacz (yellow card) 51'	Stadium: Hungária körúti Stadion; Attendance: 4,000; Referee: Géza Kiss; Assistant referees: Hajdó, Z. Szabó

15 May 1999 30	Siófok	0–1	MTK	Siófok
19:00 CEST (UTC+2)	Juhász (yellow card) 11'; Bimbó (yellow card) 27'; Csoknay (yellow card) 45'	Report	Z. Molnár (yellow card) 44'; Erős 54'	Stadium: Révész Géza utcai Stadion; Attendance: 1,500; Referee: Béla Kiss; Assistant referees: Kassai, Mező

23 May 1999 31	MTK	3–2	BVSC-Zugló	Budapest
19:00 CEST (UTC+2)	Erős 20'; Illés 39'; Madar 60'; Szekér (yellow card) 83'	Report	Usvat (yellow card) 37'; Détári 61'; Pomper 66'	Stadium: Hungária körúti Stadion; Attendance: 1,000; Referee: József Bukovics; Assistant referees: Szarka, Fridély

29 May 1999 32	Debrecen	3–1	MTK	Debrecen
17:00 CEST (UTC+2)	Sabo 10'; Ilea 45', 50'; Bodnár (yellow card) 52'	Report	Halmai (yellow card) 8'; Illés 75'; Komlósi (yellow card) 86'	Stadium: Oláh Gábor utcai Stadion; Attendance: 6,000; Referee: László Cserna; Assistant referees: T. Vámos, G. Kiss

12 June 1999 33	MTK	2–0	Újpest	Budapest
17:00 CEST (UTC+2)	Urbán 17' (o.g.); Erős (yellow card) 24'; V. Farkas 45'; Preisinger (yellow card) 52'	Report	Kvasz (yellow card) 69'	Stadium: Hungária körúti Stadion; Attendance: 4,000; Referee: Attila Ábrahám; Assistant referees: Balajti, Georgiou

16 June 1999 34	Győr	1–0	MTK	Győr
17:00 CEST (UTC+2)	Csató (yellow card) 58'; Vayer 64', (yellow card) 90'	Report	Kenesei (yellow card) 37'; Erős (yellow card) 70'	Stadium: Stadion ETO; Attendance: 4,000; Referee: Zsolt Szabó; Assistant referees: Szarka, Tompos

=== Magyar Kupa ===
28 October 1998 Round of 32	Edelény	1–3	MTK	Edelény
12:30 CET (UTC+1)	Sándor 23', (yellow card) 31'; Vanyó (yellow card) 83'	Report	Illés 13'; Kenesei 42'; Kincses (yellow card) 53'; A. Farkas (yellow card) 62'; Balaskó 76'	Stadium: Kastélykerti Sportpálya; Attendance: 600; Referee: Csaba Sápi; Assistant referees: Nyilas, Némethy

11 November 1998 Round of 16	MTK	1–2	Tatabánya	Budapest
17:00 CET (UTC+1)	Balaskó 29'; Szamosi (yellow card) 45'; Halmai (red card) 69'	Report	S. Nagy 17', (yellow card) 80'; Gelei (yellow card) 29'; A. Kovács 66' (pen.); Szoboszlai (yellow card) 49' (yellow-red card) 71'; N. Tóth II (yellow card) 87'	Stadium: Hungária körúti Stadion; Attendance: 1,000; Referee: Szabolcs Saskőy; Assistant referees: Vámos, G. Kiss

=== UEFA Cup Winners' Cup ===
==== Qualifying round ====
13 August 1998 First leg	GÍ Gøta (Faroe Islands)	1–3	(Hungary) MTK	Toftir, Faroe Islands
19:00 WEST (UTC+1)	Olsen 10'; Ennigard (yellow card) 31'; H. Jarnskor (yellow card) 73'	Report	Kenesei 18'; Preisinger 19'; Z. Molnár (yellow card) 71'; Szekeres 90'	Stadium: Svangaskarð; Attendance: 400; Referee: Kristinn Jakobsson (Iceland); Assistant referees: Gunnlaugsson (Iceland), Bergmann (Iceland)

27 August 1998 Second leg	MTK (Hungary)	7–0 (10–1 agg.)	(Faroe Islands) GÍ Gøta	Budapest, Hungary
20:00 CEST (UTC+2)	Kenesei 16', 71', 76'; Preisinger 34'; Halmai 37'; Illés 63'; Balaskó 72'	Report		Stadium: Hungária körúti Stadion; Attendance: 1,500; Referee: Otar Guntadze (Georgia); Assistant referees: Dolidze (Georgia), Elikasvili (Georgia)
Note: MTK won 10–1 on aggregate.

==== First round ====
17 September 1998 First leg	Ried (Austria)	2–0	(Hungary) MTK	Ried, Austria
18:00 CEST (UTC+2)	Strafner 19'; Brunmayr (yellow card) 35'; Angerschmid (yellow card) 39'; Komlósi 65' (o.g.); Berensztajn (yellow card) 88'	Report	Halmai (yellow card) 53'; Erős (yellow card) 67'	Stadium: Stadion der Stadt Ried; Attendance: 4,500; Referee: Yuri Baskakov (Russia); Assistant referees: Kostin (Russia), Veszelovszkij (Russia)

1 October 1998 Second leg	MTK (Hungary)	0–1 (0–3 agg.)	(Austria) Ried	Budapest, Hungary
18:30 CEST (UTC+2)	Kenesei (yellow card) 24'; Z. Molnár (yellow card) 34'; Szekeres (yellow card) 87'	Report	Strafner 10'; Rothbauer (yellow card) 14'	Stadium: Hungária körúti Stadion; Attendance: 3,500; Referee: Martin Ingvarsson (Sweden); Assistant referees: Ekström (Sweden), Larsson (Sweden)
Note: Ried won 3–0 on aggregate.
