= 1996–97 Magyar Kupa =

Tournament details
- Country: Hungary

Final positions
- Champions: MTK
- Runners-up: BVSC

The 1996–97 Hungarian Cup (Hungarian: Samsung Magyar Kupa) had involved professional teams at all levels throughout the country. The winner of the Hungarian Cup is guaranteed no worse than one of Hungary's one spots in the UEFA Cup Winners' Cup. In 1997, MTK won the competition by beating NB I 6th place BVSC in the final on May 21, 1997.

== Group stage ==
=== Group 1 ===
Pos	Team	Pld	W	D	L	GF	GA	GD	Pts	Qualification	KAP	ZAL	KOR	REP
1	Kaposvár	3	3	0	0	9	4	+5	9	Advance to knockout phase	—	2–1		
2	Zalaegerszeg	3	2	0	1	15	2	+13	6	Advance to knockout phase		—		
3	Koroncó	3	1	0	2	4	12	−8	3		1–4	0–7	—	3–1
4	Répcelak	3	0	0	3	3	13	−10	0		2–3	0–7		—

July 1996
Koroncó	1–4	Kaposvár
Répcelak	0–7	Zalaegerszeg
July 1996
Koroncó FC	0–7	Zalaegerszeg
Répcelak	2–3	Kaposvár
August 1996
Kaposvár	2–1	Zalaegerszeg
Koroncó	3–1	Répcelak

=== Group 2 ===
Pos	Team	Pld	W	D	L	GF	GA	GD	Pts	Qualification	GYO	KER	KOR	SUM
1	Győr	3	2	1	0	12	2	+10	7	Advance to knockout phase	—	1–1		
2	III. Kerület	3	2	1	0	12	4	+8	7	Advance to knockout phase		—		
3	Körmend	3	0	1	2	2	10	−8	1		1–2	1–8	—	
4	Sümeg	3	0	1	2	2	12	−10	1		0–9	2–3	0–0	—

July 1996
Körmend	1–2	Győr
Sümeg	2–3	III. Kerület
July 1996
Körmend	1–8	III. Kerület
Sümeg	0–9	Győr
August 1996
Győr	1–1	III. Kerület
Sümeg	0–0	Körmend

=== Group 3 ===
Pos	Team	Pld	W	D	L	GF	GA	GD	Pts	Qualification	FCS	SIO	JUT	SZE
1	FC Sopron	3	2	1	0	5	2	+3	7	Advance to knockout phase	—	2–1		
2	Siófok	3	1	1	1	5	4	+1	4	Advance to knockout phase		—		
3	Jutas Veszprém	3	1	1	1	4	5	−1	4		0–0	1–3	—	
4	Szentgotthárd	3	0	1	2	4	7	−3	1		1–3	1–1	2–3	—

July 1996
Jutas Veszprém	1–3	Siófok
Szentgotthárd	1–3	FC Sopron
July 1996
Szentgotthárd	1–1	Siófok
Jutas Veszprém	0–0	FC Sopron
August 1996
FC Sopron	2–1	Siófok
Szentgotthárd	2–3	Jutas Veszprém

=== Group 4 ===
Pos	Team	Pld	W	D	L	GF	GA	GD	Pts	Qualification	HAL	SOP	MIK	PAP
1	Haladás	3	2	1	0	10	1	+9	7	Advance to knockout phase	—			
2	Soproni FAC	3	1	2	0	5	2	+3	5	Advance to knockout phase	1–1	—		
3	Miklósfa	3	1	1	1	4	7	−3	4		0–4	1–1	—	3–2
4	Pápa	3	0	0	3	2	11	−9	0		0–5	0–3		—

July 1996
Miklósfa	0–4	Haladás
Pápa	0–3	Soproni FAC
July 1996
Miklósfa	3–2	Pápa
Soproni FAC	1–1	Haladás
August 1996
Miklósfa	1–1	Soproni FAC
Pápa	0–5	Haladás

=== Group 5 ===
Pos	Team	Pld	W	D	L	GF	GA	GD	Pts	Qualification	MTK	CSA	NAG	FON
1	MTK	3	3	0	0	14	1	+13	9	Advance to knockout phase	—			
2	Csákvár	3	2	0	1	7	8	−1	6	Advance to knockout phase	0–5	—	3–2	
3	Nagykanizsa	3	1	0	2	14	6	+8	3		0–1		—	
4	Fonyód	3	0	0	3	4	24	−20	0		1–8	1–4	2–12	—

July 1996
Csákvár	3–2	Nagykanizsa
Fonyód	1–8	MTK
July 1996
Fonyód	1–4	Csákvár
Nagykanizsa	0–1	MTK
August 1996
Fonyód	2–12	Nagykanizsa
Csákvár	0–5	MTK

=== Group 6 ===
Pos	Team	Pld	W	D	L	GF	GA	GD	Pts	Qualification	PAK	DOR	VAS	LAJ
1	Paks	3	2	0	1	8	3	+5	6	Advance to knockout phase	—		3–0	
2	Dorog	3	2	0	1	9	5	+4	6	Advance to knockout phase	3–2	—	0–1	
3	Vasas	3	2	0	1	3	4	−1	6				—	
4	Lajoskomárom	3	0	0	3	3	11	−8	0		0–3	2–6	1–2	—

July 1996
Dorog	3–2	Paks
Lajoskomárom	1–2	Vasas
July 1996
Lajoskomárom	0–3	Paks
Dorog	0–1	Vasas
August 1996
Lajoskomárom	2–6	Dorog
Paks	3–0	Vasas

=== Group 7 ===
Pos	Team	Pld	W	D	L	GF	GA	GD	Pts	Qualification	VID	SOR	BAL	PER
1	Videoton	3	2	1	0	7	3	+4	7	Advance to knockout phase	—			
2	Soroksár	3	2	0	1	7	4	+3	6	Advance to knockout phase	1–4	—		
3	Balatonlelle	3	1	1	1	2	4	−2	4		1–1	0–3	—	
4	Perbál	3	0	0	3	1	6	−5	0		1–2	0–3	0–1	—

July 1996
Perbál	1–2	Videoton
Balatonlelle	0–3	Soroksár
July 1996
Perbál	0–3	Soroksár
Balatonlelle	1–1	Videoton
August 1996
Soroksár	1–4	Videoton
Perbál	0–1	Balatonlelle

=== Group 8 ===
Pos	Team	Pld	W	D	L	GF	GA	GD	Pts	Qualification	TIS	STA	JAM	JAS
1	Tiszavasvári	3	3	0	0	6	1	+5	9	Advance to knockout phase	—	3–1		
2	Stadler	3	2	0	1	6	4	+2	6	Advance to knockout phase		—		
3	Jamina Patrick	3	1	0	2	4	4	0	3		0–1	1–2	—	3–1
4	Jászberény	3	0	0	3	1	8	−7	0		0–2	0–3		—

July 1996
Jászberény	0–2	Tiszavasvári
Jamina Patrick	1–2	Stadler
July 1996
Tiszavasvári	3–1	Stadler
Jamina Patrick	3–1	Jászberény
August 1996
Jamina Patrick	0–1	Tiszavasvári
Jászberény	0–3	Stadler

=== Group 9 ===
Pos	Team	Pld	W	D	L	GF	GA	GD	Pts	Qualification	DEB	KEC	BAK	CSA
1	Debrecen	3	3	0	0	11	3	+8	9	Advance to knockout phase	—			
2	Kecskemét	3	2	0	1	9	2	+7	6	Advance to knockout phase	0–2	—		
3	Baktalórántháza	3	1	0	2	10	12	−2	3		2–5	0–3	—	
4	Csabacsűd	3	0	0	3	5	18	−13	0		1–4	0–6	4–8	—

July 1996
Csabacsűd	0–6	Kecskemét
Baktalórántháza	2–5	Debrecen
July 1996
Csabacsűd	1–4	Debrecen
Baktalórántháza	0–3	Kecskemét
August 1996
Csabacsűd	4–8	Baktalórántháza
Kecskemét	0–2	Debrecen

=== Group 10 ===
Pos	Team	Pld	W	D	L	GF	GA	GD	Pts	Qualification	CSE	DUN	SZO	LAK
1	Csepel	3	2	1	0	8	4	+4	7	Advance to knockout phase	—			
2	Dunaszekcső	3	1	1	1	7	7	0	4	Advance to knockout phase	0–3	—	2–2	
3	Szolnok	3	1	1	1	5	5	0	4		2–3		—	
4	Lakitelek	3	0	1	2	4	8	−4	1		2–2	2–5	0–1	—

July 1996
Dunaszekcső	0–3	Csepel
Lakitelek	0–1	Szolnok
July 1996
Dunaszekcső	2–2	Szolnok
Lakitelek	2–2	Csepel
August 1996
Szolnok	2–3	Csepel
Lakitelek	2–5	Dunaszekcső

=== Group 11 ===
Pos	Team	Pld	W	D	L	GF	GA	GD	Pts	Qualification	BEK	KCF	HAJ	SAN
1	Békéscsaba (Note: On 3 September 1996, Békéscsaba were excluded by the Disciplinary Committee of the HFF after fielding three ineligible players in the match against Hajós, resulting in Hajós advancing to the knockout phase.)	3	2	1	0	22	6	+16	7	Excluded	—			
2	Hajdúszoboszló	3	1	2	0	10	5	+5	5	Advance to knockout phase	3–3	—		
3	Hajós	3	1	1	1	7	11	−4	4	Advance to knockout phase	2–10	1–1	—	4–0
4	Sándorfalva	3	0	0	3	2	19	−17	0		1–9	1–6		—

Notes:

July 1996
Sándorfalva	1–9	Békéscsaba
Hajós	1–1	Hajdúszoboszló
July 1996
Hajdúszoboszló	3–3	Békéscsaba
Hajós	4–0	Sándorfalva
August 1996
Sándorfalva	1–6	Hajdúszoboszló
Hajós	2–10	Békéscsaba

=== Group 12 ===
Pos	Team	Pld	W	D	L	GF	GA	GD	Pts	Qualification	UJP	DIO	SEL	TIS
1	Újpest	3	3	0	0	9	1	+8	9	Advance to knockout phase	—			
2	Diósgyőr	3	2	0	1	11	4	+7	6	Advance to knockout phase	0–2	—		
3	Selypi Kinizsi	3	1	0	2	7	10	−3	3		0–3	0–6	—	
4	Tiszamenti	3	0	0	3	4	16	−12	0		1–4	2–5	1–7	—

July 1996
Selypi Kinizsi	0–6	Diósgyőr
Tiszamenti	1–4	Újpest
July 1996
Tiszamenti	2–5	Diósgyőr
Selypi Kinizsi	0–3	Újpest
August 1996
Tiszamenti	1–7	Selypi Kinizsi
Diósgyőr	0–2	Újpest

=== Group 13 ===
Pos	Team	Pld	W	D	L	GF	GA	GD	Pts	Qualification	VAC	PAL	RAK	FEL
1	Vác	3	2	1	0	7	1	+6	7	Advance to knockout phase	—			
2	Pálháza	3	1	1	1	5	5	0	4	Advance to knockout phase	1–1	—	2–3	2–1
3	Rákospalota	3	1	0	2	3	5	−2	3		0–2		—	
4	Felsőtárkány	3	1	0	2	2	6	−4	3		0–4		1–0	—

July 1996
Felsőtárkány	1–0	Rákospalota
Pálháza	1–1	Vác
July 1996
Felsőtárkány	0–4	Vác
Pálháza	2–3	Rákospalota
August 1996
Rákospalota	0–2	Vác
Pálháza	2–1	Felsőtárkány

=== Group 14 ===
Pos	Team	Pld	W	D	L	GF	GA	GD	Pts	Qualification	BVS	VEL	BAL	VEC
1	BVSC	3	2	1	0	4	2	+2	7	Advance to knockout phase	—			
2	Velence	3	1	1	1	4	6	−2	4	Advance to knockout phase	2–2	—	3–1	
3	Balatonfüred	3	1	0	2	4	4	0	3		0–1		—	
4	Vecsés	3	1	0	2	4	4	0	3		0–1	1–2	3–1	—

July 1996
Vecsés	3–1	Balatonfüred
Velence	2–2	BVSC
July 1996
Vecsés	1–2	Velence
Balatonfüred	0–1	BVSC
August 1996
Velence	0–3	Balatonfüred
Vecsés	0–1	BVSC

=== Group 15 ===
Pos	Team	Pld	W	D	L	GF	GA	GD	Pts	Qualification	SAL	BUD	KIS	TOR
1	Salgótarján	3	2	1	0	6	3	+3	7	Advance to knockout phase	—		2–1	
2	Budafok	3	2	0	1	11	5	+6	6	Advance to knockout phase	0–2	—	4–3	
3	Kispest-Honvéd	3	1	0	2	7	7	0	3				—	
4	Törökbálint	3	0	1	2	3	12	−9	1		2–2	0–7	1–3	—

July 1996
Törökbálint	2–2	Salgótarján
Budafok	4–3	Kispest-Honvéd
July 1996
Budafok	0–2	Salgótarján
Törökbálint	1–3	Kispest-Honvéd
August 1996
Salgótarján	2–1	Kispest-Honvéd
Törökbálint	0–7	Budafok

=== Group 16 ===
Pos	Team	Pld	W	D	L	GF	GA	GD	Pts	Qualification	FER	BES	BKV	PET
1	Ferencváros	3	3	0	0	16	0	+16	9	Advance to knockout phase	—			
2	Besenyőtelek	3	1	1	1	5	6	−1	4	Advance to knockout phase	0–5	—	1–1	
3	BKV Előre	3	1	1	1	3	6	−3	4		0–5		—	
4	Péteri	3	0	0	3	0	12	−12	0		0–6	0–4	0–2	—

July 1996
Péteri	0–4	Besenyőtelek
BKV Előre	0–5	Ferencváros
July 1996
Besenyőtelek	0–5	Ferencváros
Péteri	0–2	BKV Előre
August 1996
Péteri	0–6	Ferencváros
Besenyőtelek	1–1	BKV Előre

== Knockout phase ==
=== Round of 32 ===
Team 1	Agg.	Team 2	1st leg	2nd leg
Velence	2–2 (a)	Kaposvár	1–0	1–2
Vác	4–3	Siófok	2–1	2–2
Újpest	4–1	Dorog	4–0	0–1
Soroksár	4–2	Hajós	1–0	3–2
Soproni FAC	1–2	Tiszavasvári	1–0	0–2
Salgótarján	3–2	Stadler	2–0	1–2
Pálháza	1–5	Csepel	1–3	0–2
MTK	4–1	Budafok	2–0	2–1
Kecskemét	0–2	Haladás	0–1	0–1
Hajdúszoboszló	3–2	Győr	0–0	3–2
Dunaszekcső	1–7	Ferencváros	1–0	0–7
Diósgyőr	1–3	Paks	1–0	0–3
Debrecen	1–3	III. Kerület	1–0	0–3
Csákvár	1–5	Videoton	0–0	1–5
BVSC	4–3	Zalaegerszeg	2–3	2–0
Besenyőtelek	0–6	FC Sopron	0–2	0–4

==== First leg ====
11 September 1996

Velence	1 – 0	Kaposvár
T. Kovács 26'

Sporttelep Velencei, Velence
Attendance: 500
Referee: Attila Hanacsek

2 October 1996

Újpest	4 – 0	Dorog
Véber 12'; Szanyó 15'; Sebők 44'; Herczeg 58'

Szusza Ferenc Stadium, Budapest
Attendance: 500
Referee: Béla Kiss

2 October 1996

Soroksár	1 – 0	Hajós
Vikukel 85'

Stadion Haraszti Út, Budapest
Attendance: 200
Referee: Attila Ábrahám

2 October 1996

Soproni FAC	1 – 0	Tiszavasvári
Majoros 32'

Stadion Városi, Sopron
Attendance: 100
Referee: László Molnár

2 October 1996

Salgótarján	2 – 0	Stadler
Gubán 48'; M. Bíró 74'

Sporttelep Városi, Salgótarján
Attendance: 1000
Referee: Sándor Márton

2 October 1996

Pálháza	1 – 3	Csepel
Cs. Kovács 75'		Z. Kenesei 29' 87'; Bubcsó 34'

Sporttelep Városi, Pálháza
Attendance: 800
Referee: László Vida

2 October 1996

MTK	2 – 0	Budafok
Preisinger 50'; Kuttor 58'

Hidegkuti Nándor Stadium, Budapest
Attendance: 500
Referee: Ferenc Lettrich

2 October 1996

Kecskemét	0 – 1	Haladás
		K. Varga 83'

Széktói Stadion, Kecskemét
Attendance: 500
Referee: Sándor Varga

2 October 1996

Hajdúszoboszló	0 – 0	Győr

Sporttelep Városi, Hajdúszoboszló
Attendance: 1500
Referee: Attila Hajdó

2 October 1996

Dunaszekcső	1 – 0	Ferencváros
Pankovics 56'

Sporttelep Városi, Dunaszekcső
Attendance: 2000
Referee: László Vágner

2 October 1996

Diósgyőr	1 – 0	Paks
Bozó 89'

DVTK Stadion, Miskolc
Attendance: 1000
Referee: Sándor Piller

2 October 1996

Debrecen	1 – 0	III. Kerület
Bagoly 85'; Cs. Madar (red card) 59'

Stadion Oláh Gábor Út, Debrecen
Attendance: 4000
Referee: Zsolt Szabó

2 October 1996

Csákvár	0 – 0	Videoton

Sporttelep Városi, Csákvár
Attendance: 1000
Referee: Ferenc Bede

2 October 1996

BVSC	2 – 3	Zalaegerszeg
Egressy 10' 55'		Gaál 13'; Zs. Szabó 60' 76'

Szőnyi úti Stadion, Budapest
Attendance: 200
Referee: József Bukovics

2 October 1996

Besenyőtelek	0 – 2	FC Sopron
		Körmendi 18'; I. Kovács 21'

Sporttelep Városi, Besenyőtelek
Attendance: 400
Referee: Zoltán Kurmai

7 October 1996

Vác	2 – 1	Siófok
Kasza 7'; Vojtekovszki 39'		Zs. Takács 20'

Stadion Városi Vác, Vác
Attendance: 1000
Referee: László Cserna

==== Second leg ====
23 October 1996

Kaposvár	2 – 1 ( 2 – 2 agg.)	Velence
Meksz 7'; Köves 78'		Petres 32'; Huszár (red card) 75'

Stadion Kaposvár Rákoczi, Kaposvár
Attendance: 400
Referee: Ferenc Vavika

23 October 1996

Siófok	2 – 2 ( 3 – 4 )	Vác
Z. Szabó 43'; Filipovic 60'; T. Juhász (red card) 84'		Vámosi 85'; Andrássy 86'; P. Horváth (red card) 79'

Révesz Géza Stadion, Siófok
Attendance: 1500
Referee: Ferenc Lettrich

23 October 1996

Dorog	1 – 0 ( 1 – 4 )	Újpest
Bajor 66' (pen.)

Sporttelep Városi, Dorog
Attendance: 2500
Referee: Lajos Mohácsi

23 October 1996

Hajós	2 – 3 ( 2 – 4 )	Soroksár
Koch 10' 89'		Csák 14'; Simon 21' 55'

Sporttelep Városi, Hajós
Attendance: 700
Referee: Vencel Tóth

23 October 1996

Tiszavasvári	2 – 0 ( 2 – 1 )	Soproni FAC
Bohács 39'; Rosu 65'

Városi Stadion, Tiszavasvári
Attendance: 2000
Referee: József Mezei

23 October 1996

Stadler	2 – 1 ( 2 – 3 )	Salgótarján
Szentmártoni 2'; Pálfi 38'		Z. Balogh 12' (o.g.)

Stadler Stadion, Akasztó
Attendance: 300
Referee: János Megyebíró

23 October 1996

Csepel	2 – 0 ( 5 – 1 )	Pálháza
Baranyi 16'; T. Nagy 87'

Stadion Csepeli, Csepel, Budapest
Attendance: 500
Referee: Csaba Sápi

23 October 1996

Budafok	1 – 2 ( 1 – 4 )	MTK
Földes 72'		Farkasházy 45'; Halmai 77'

Stadion Promontor úti, Budafok, Budapest
Attendance: 600
Referee: Tamás Arany

23 October 1996

Haladás	1 – 0 ( 2 – 0 )	Kecskemét
Cs. Fehér 45'

Stadion Rohonci Út, Szombathely
Attendance: 2000
Referee: Ferenc Hosszú

23 October 1996

Győr	2 – 3 ( 2 – 3 )	Hajdúszoboszló
Ferenczi 15' 18'		Cipf 8'; Ternován 39'; Ulveczky 77'

ETO Park, Győr
Attendance: 2000
Referee: Sándor Márton

23 October 1996

Ferencváros	7 – 0 ( 7 – 1 )	Dunaszekcső
Arany 9' 41'; Lisztes 22'; Nyilas 65' (pen.) 89'; Telek 77'; F. Horváth 87'

Stadion Albert Flórián, Budapest
Attendance: 3500
Referee: Zoltán Kurmai

23 October 1996

Paks	3 – 0 ( 3 – 1 )	Diósgyőr
Répási 13'; Gubucz 69'; Vayer 78'

Stadion PSE, Paks
Attendance: 500
Referee: István Vad

23 October 1996

III. Kerület	3 – 0 ( 3 – 1 )	Debrecen
Jankov 11' 39'; Szatmári 68' (o.g.)

Stadion Hévízi úti, Budapest
Attendance: 1000
Referee: Attila Hanacsek

23 October 1996

Videoton	5 – 1 ( 5 – 1 )	Csákvár
Donát 5'; Dvéri 53'; Schindler 59'; Árgyelán 77' 80'		J. Takács 27'

Stadion Sóstói, Székesfehérvár
Attendance: 1500
Referee: Ferenc Vavika

23 October 1996

Zalaegerszeg	0 – 2 ( 3 – 4 )	BVSC
		Bükszegi 64' 81'

ZTE Arena, Zalaegerszeg
Attendance: 2500
Referee: Géza Kiss

23 October 1996

FC Sopron	4 – 0 ( 6 – 0 )	Besenyőtelek
Z. Szabó 25'; Gombás 35'; I. Kovács 40'; Ács 85'		Lengyel (red card) 83'

Stadion Városi, Sopron
Attendance: 200
Referee: Csaba Ákos

=== Round of 16 ===
Team 1	Agg.	Team 2	1st leg	2nd leg
Videoton	1–2	BVSC	0–1	1–1
Velence	2–7	Soroksár	1–2	1–5
Vác	6–3	Tiszavasvári	2–1	4–2
Salgótarján	2–2 (a)	FC Sopron	1–2	1–0
MTK	3–2	Újpest	2–2	1–0
III. Kerület	5–2	Paks	3–1	2–1
Haladás	7–4	Hajdúszoboszló	4–4	3–0
Csepel	2–9	Ferencváros	0–3	2–6

==== First leg ====
21 November 1996

Vác	2 – 1	Tiszavasvári
Kasza 33'; T. Nagy 74' (pen.)		Bohács 81' (pen.)

Stadion Városi Vác, Vác
Attendance: 400
Referee: Tamás Arany

21 November 1996

MTK	2 – 2	Újpest
Kuttor 70'; Csillag 77'		Herczeg 80'; Bérczy 90'

Hidegkuti Nándor Stadium, Budapest
Attendance: 3000
Referee: László Molnár

21 November 1996

Haladás	4 – 4	Hajdúszoboszló
Usvat 25'; E. Király 60' 85' 89'		A. Fekete 27'; Cipf 44'; Ternován 66' 87'

Stadion Rohonci Út, Szombathely
Attendance: 2000
Referee: Ferenc Hosszú

21 November 1996

Csepel	0 – 3	Ferencváros
		F. Horváth 67' 73'; Holló 75'

Stadion Csepeli, Csepel, Budapest
Attendance: 3000
Referee: István Hanyecz

24 November 1996

Velence	1 – 2	Soroksár
Wéninger 80'		Gyurováth 20'; Kislőrincz 49'

Sporttelep Városi, Velence
Attendance: 600
Referee: József Szabó

24 November 1996

Salgótarján	1 – 2	FC Sopron
Gubán 90+2'		Gombás 60'; Z. Szabó 81'

Sporttelep Városi, Salgótarján
Attendance: 1000
Referee: Péter Veres

28 November 1996

Videoton	0 – 1	BVSC
Bükszegi 54'

Stadion Sóstói, Székesfehérvár
Attendance: 500
Referee: Ferenc Lettrich

28 November 1996

III. Kerület	3 – 1	Paks
P. Lendvai 30'; Szeitl 63' 75'		Major 6'

Stadion Hévízi úti, Budapest
Attendance: 500
Referee: Béla Kiss

==== Second leg ====
28 November 1996

Tiszavasvári	2 – 4 ( 3 – 6 )	Vác
Erdei 60'; Rosu 67'		Bánföldi 46'; Nyikos 66'; Vojtekovszki 77'; Borgulya 87'

Sporttelep Városi, Tiszavasvári
Attendance: 1500
Referee: József Bukovics

28 November 1996

FC Sopron	0 – 1 ( 2 – 2 agg.)	Salgótarján
		Géczi 86'

Stadion Városi, Sopron
Attendance: 300
Referee: József Molnár

28 November 1996

Újpest	0 – 1 ( 2 – 3 )	MTK
		Zsivóczky 31'

Szusza Ferenc Stadium, Újpest, Budapest
Attendance: 4000
Referee: Ferenc Bede

28 November 1996

Hajdúszoboszló	0 – 3 ( 4 – 7 )	Haladás
M. Szilágyi (red card) 72'		E. Király 20' 57'; Kádár 41'; T. Neudl (red card) 60'

Sporttelep Városi, Hajdúszoboszló
Attendance: 1200
Referee: Sándor Varga

28 November 1996

Ferencváros	6 – 2 ( 9 – 2 )	Csepel
Nicsenko 12' 40' 52'; Miriuță 60'; Nyilas 68' 84'		B. Lukács 4'; Z. Kenesei 62'

Stadion Albert Flórián, Budapest
Attendance: 1500
Referee: Zoltán Kurmai

2 December 1996

Soroksár	5 – 1 ( 7 – 2 )	Velence
Borsányi 10' (o.g.); Kislőrincz 37'; Csák 42' 86'; Boda 81'		Borsányi 20'

Stadion Haraszti úti, Budapest
Attendance: 500
Referee: Lajos Herbály

5 December 1996

BVSC	1 – 1 ( 2 – 1 )	Videoton
N. Tóth 23' (o.g.)		Dvéri 60'

Stadion Szőnyi úti, Budapest
Attendance: 100
Referee: Sándor Márton

5 December 1996

Paks	1 – 2 ( 2 – 5 )	III. Kerület
Major 50'		I. Kiss 2'; P. Lendvai 26'

Stadion PSE, Paks
Attendance: 1200
Referee: Attila Ábrahám

=== Quarter-finals ===
Team 1	Agg.	Team 2	1st leg	2nd leg
III. Kerület	1–6	MTK	1–2	0–4
Soroksár	3–4	Haladás	2–0	1–4
FC Sopron	0–4	BVSC	0–1	0–3
Ferencváros	2–5	Vác	2–2	0–3

=== Semi-finals ===
Team 1	Agg.	Team 2	1st leg	2nd leg
MTK	6–3	Vác	4–0	2–3
BVSC	3–0	Haladás	3–0	0–0

=== Final ===
21 May 1997
20:00 (UTC+2)

MTK	6–0	BVSC
Halmai 12'; Erős 28' (o.g.); Illés 33'; Orosz 36'; Kenesei 66'; Lőrincz 83' (pen.)	Report

Hidegkuti Nándor Stadion, Budapest
Attendance: 2,000
Referee: László Molnár (Hungary)
11 June 1997
19:00 (UTC+2)

BVSC	0–2	MTK
	Report	Orosz 58', 73'

Szőnyi úti Stadion, Budapest
Attendance: 1,000
Referee: Sándor Puhl (Hungary)

MTK won 8–0 on aggregate.
