= 1998–99 Nemzeti Bajnokság I =

Nemzeti Bajnokság I
- Season: 1998–99
- Champions: MTK Budapest
- Relegated: Videoton; Budapesti VSC; III. Kerületi TVE
- Champions League: MTK Budapest
- UEFA Cup: Ferencváros; Újpest
- Intertoto Cup: Vasas
- Matches: 306
- Goals: 859 (2.81 per match)
- Top goalscorer: Béla Illés (22)
- Biggest home win: Ferencváros 7–1 III. Kerület
- Biggest away win: Kispest 1–5 BVSC; III. Kerület 1–5 MTK
- Highest scoring: Győr 5–4 Diósgyőr

The 1998–99 Nemzeti Bajnokság I, also known as NB I for short, was the 97th season of top-tier football in Hungary. The league is officially named Professzionális Nemzeti Bajnokság (PNB) for sponsorship reasons. The season began on 24 July 1998 and ended on the weekend 16 June 1999. Újpest are the defending champions, having won their 20th Hungarian championship at the end of the 1998–99 season.

MTK won their 21st national title, finishing 19 points above Ferencváros, and 20 points above defending champions Újpest. MTK were already leading the table before the winter-break by 11 points. By Gameweek 26 they had extended their lead to 14 points. MTK's championship was confirmed on Gameweek 30, after defeating Gázszer 2–0 at Hungária Körút. Sándor Egervári's men only lost two home games throughout the season, and won 10 consecutive league games between November and April.

== Teams ==
Tiszakécskei FC, Előre FC Békéscsaba and Stadler FC finished the 1997–98 season in the bottom three places of the table and thus were relegated to their respective NB II divisions. Békéscsaba ended a 6-year and Stadler 4-year stay in the top league, while Tiszakécske were relegated after just one year in the league.

=== Stadium and locations ===
Location of teams in 1998–99 Nemzeti Bajnokság I

Club	Short name	City	Stadium	Capacity
BVSC-Zugló FC	BVSC	Budapest	Szőnyi Street Stadium	9,000
Debreceni VSC-Epona	Debrecen	Debrecen	Oláh Gábor utcai stadion	9,640
Diósgyőri FC	Diósgyőr	Miskolc	DVTK Stadion	11,300
Dunaferr SE	Dunaújvaros	Dunaújváros	Stadion Eszperantó Út	12,000
Ferencvárosi TC	Ferencváros	Budapest	Albert Flórián Stadion	18,100
Gázszer FC	Gázszer	Akasztó	Stadler Stadium	12,000
Győri ETO FC	Győr	Győr	ETO Park	16,000
Haladás-Milos	Haladás	Szombathely	Rohonci úti stadion	12,000
III. Kerület FC-AT	III. Kerület	Budapest	Hévízi Street Stadium	3,000
Kispest-Honvéd FC	Honvéd	Budapest	Bozsik Stadion	10,000
MTK Hungária	MTK	Budapest	Hidegkuti Nándor Stadium	12,700
Nyírség-Spartacus	Nyíregyháza	Nyíregyháza	Városi Stadion	16,500
Siófok FC	Siófok	Siófok	Révész Géza utcai stadion	10,500
Újpest FC	Újpest	Budapest	Szusza Ferenc Stadion	13,500
Vasas DH	Vasas	Budapest	Illovszky Rudolf Stadion	12,000
Dunakanyar-Vác FC	Vác	Vác	Stadion Városi Vác	10,500
Videoton FC	Videoton	Székesfehérvár	Sóstói Stadion	15,000
Zalahús ZTE FC	ZTE	Zalaegerszeg	ZTE Aréna	9,000

=== Personnel and kits ===
Note: Flags indicate national team as has been defined under FIFA eligibility rules. Players may hold more than one non-FIFA nationality.

Team	Manager	Captain	Kit manufacturer	Shirt sponsor
BVSC	(Hungary) József Tajti	(Ukraine) Oleksandr Bondarenko	Nike	InterCity
Debrecen	(Hungary) Lajos Garamvölgyi	(Hungary) Zoltán Böőr	Adidas	Epona, MÁV Rt., OTP Bank
Diósgyőr	(Hungary) Miklós Temesvári	(Hungary) István Téger	Adidas	Borsod Brewery
Dunaújváros	(Hungary) Ferenc Ebedli	(Hungary) Gábor Zavadszky	Umbro	Dunaferr
Ferencváros	(Croatia) Marijan Vlak	(Hungary) András Telek	Adidas	
Gázszer	(Hungary) Gábor Hartyáni	(Hungary) István Kövesfalvi	Diadora	
Győr	(Hungary) István Reszeli Soós	(Hungary) Gábor Vayer	Adidas	Rába
Haladás	(Hungary) István Mihalecz	(Hungary) Csaba Balog	Hummel	Steffl Bier
III. Kerület	(Hungary) Lajos Schróth	(Hungary) Balázs Tordai	Umbro	Auto Trader, Rocco Jeans
Kispest	(Hungary) György Gálhidi	(Hungary) János Dubecz	Umbro	Ibusz
MTK	(Hungary) Sándor Egervári	(Hungary) Csaba Madar	Nike	Fotex
Nyíregyháza	(Hungary) Tibor Őze	(Hungary) Zoltán Szatke	Adidas	Taurus
Siófok	(Hungary) József Mészáros	(Hungary) Zsolt Posza	Toti	
Újpest	(Hungary) Péter Várhidi	(Hungary) Szabolcs Bíró	Joma	Espon
Vasas	(Hungary) Imre Gellei	(Hungary) Tamás Mónos	Lotto	Danubius Hotels
Vác	(Hungary) János Csank	(Hungary) Péter Horváth	Adidas	Zollner
Videoton	(Hungary) József Verebes	(Hungary) Árpád Milinte	Uhlsport	Videoton
ZTE	(Hungary) László Strausz	(Hungary) Géza Vlaszák	Adidas	Zalahús

==== Managerial changes ====
Team	Outgoing manager	Manner of departure	Date of vacancy	Position in table	Replaced by	Date of appointment
Haladás	(Hungary) László Dajka	Sacked	17 September 1998	16th	(Hungary) István Mihalecz	17 September 1998
Videoton	(Hungary) Ferenc Csongrádi	Mutual agreement	16 October 1998	14th	(Hungary) József Verebes	16 October 1998
Debrecen	(Hungary) András Herczeg	Sacked	20 October 1998	13th	(Hungary) Lajos Garamvölgyi	20 October 1998
Ferencváros	(Hungary) Tibor Nyilasi	Mutual agreement	17 December 1998	7th	(Croatia) Marijan Vlak	29 December 1998
III. Kerület	(Germany) Ralf Wilhelms	Mutual agreement	18 December 1998	16th	(Hungary) Lajos Schróth	12 February 1999
BVSC	(Hungary) István Sándor	Sacked	22 December 1998	18th	(Federal Republic of Yugoslavia) Dragan Seklulić	3 January 1999
Diósgyőr	(Hungary) Barnabás Tornyi	Resigned	5 January 1999	3rd	(Hungary) Gábor Szapor	7 January 1999
BVSC	(Federal Republic of Yugoslavia) Dragan Seklulić	Sacked	10 February 1999	18th	(Hungary) József Tajti	10 February 1999
Diósgyőr	(Hungary) Gábor Szapor	Sacked	14 April 1999	7th	(Hungary) Miklós Temesvári	14 April 1999
Siófok	(Hungary) László Nagy	Resigned	4 May 1999	16th	(Hungary) József Mészáros	4 May 1999
Dunaújváros	(Hungary) Zoltán Varga	Resigned	12 May 1999	6th	(Hungary) Ferenc Ebedli	12 May 1999

== Overview ==
It was contested by 18 teams, and MTK Hungária FC won the championship.

== League standings ==
Pos	Team	Pld	W	D	L	GF	GA	GD	Pts	Qualification or relegation
1	MTK Hungária (C)	34	27	2	5	77	26	+51	83	Qualification for Champions League first qualifying round
2	Ferencváros	34	19	7	8	61	40	+21	64	Qualification for UEFA Cup qualifying round
3	Újpest	34	20	3	11	58	40	+18	63	Qualification for UEFA Cup qualifying round
4	Győr	34	16	11	7	53	39	+14	59	
5	Dunaferr	34	17	6	11	54	46	+8	57	
6	Vasas	34	15	10	9	51	44	+7	55	Qualification for Intertoto Cup first round
7	Zalaegerszeg	34	15	8	11	43	37	+6	53	
8	Diósgyőr	34	14	9	11	56	54	+2	51	
9	Debrecen	34	14	7	13	53	39	+14	49	Qualification for UEFA Cup first round (Note: The winners of the 1998–99 Hungarian Cup competition will qualify for the second qualifying round of the 1999–2000 UEFA Cup.)
10	Vác	34	13	10	11	51	49	+2	49	
11	Gázszer	34	11	11	12	37	40	−3	44	
12	Kispest Honvéd	34	11	9	14	38	50	−12	42	
13	Nyíregyháza	34	10	9	15	46	52	−6	39	
14	Haladás	34	10	6	18	39	54	−15	36	
15	Siófok	34	7	9	18	32	49	−17	30	
16	Videoton (R)	34	7	9	18	36	54	−18	30	Relegation to Nemzeti Bajnokság II
17	BVSC (R)	34	7	6	21	34	53	−19	27	Relegation to Nemzeti Bajnokság II
18	III. Kerület (R)	34	4	6	24	40	93	−53	18	Relegation to Nemzeti Bajnokság II

Source: soccerway.com
Rules for classification: 1st points; 2nd goal difference; 3rd goals scored; 4th overall wins.
(C) Champions; (R) Relegated

=== Positions by round ===
Team ╲ Round	1	2	3	4	5	6	7	8	9	10	11	12	13	14	15	16	17	18	19	20	21	22	23	24	25	26	27	28	29	30	31	32	33	34
MTK	7	3	3	2	1	1	1	1	1	1	1	1	1	1	1	1	1	1	1	1	1	1	1	1	1	1	1	1	1	1	1	1	1	1
Ferencváros	5	5	4	5	4	3	2	2	2	4	6	5	5	4	6	4	7	6	3	6	5	3	3	3	3	2	2	2	2	2	2	2	2	2
Újpest	4	1	1	4	9	7	10	7	8	8	9	8	6	5	4	7	8	8	7	4	6	6	4	4	4	4	3	3	3	3	3	3	3	3
Győr	10	9	8	6	5	2	4	3	3	2	2	2	2	3	2	2	2	2	2	2	2	2	2	2	2	3	4	4	4	4	4	4	5	4
Dunaferr	11	12	13	9	8	10	8	4	5	5	3	4	4	6	5	5	4	5	4	5	4	5	6	6	5	6	5	6	5	5	5	5	4	5
Vasas	2	2	5	3	2	4	7	6	7	7	5	6	9	9	9	9	9	9	10	10	9	10	9	10	9	8	8	7	6	6	6	6	6	6
Zalaegerszeg	16	17	16	15	11	12	11	10	10	9	8	7	8	8	7	6	5	7	6	3	3	4	5	5	6	5	6	5	7	7	7	7	7	7
Diósgyőr	3	8	2	1	3	5	3	5	4	3	4	3	3	2	3	3	3	3	5	7	7	7	7	7	7	7	7	9	9	9	9	10	8	8
Debrecen	1	6	9	11	12	11	14	12	13	13	13	14	14	14	13	12	11	10	9	9	10	9	10	9	10	10	10	10	10	10	10	8	9	9
Vác	8	11	10	7	6	8	5	8	9	10	10	9	7	7	8	8	6	4	8	8	8	8	8	8	8	9	9	8	8	8	8	9	10	10
Gázszer	9	7	7	8	7	6	9	11	6	6	7	10	10	10	10	11	10	11	12	11	11	11	11	11	11	11	11	11	11	11	11	11	11	11
Honvéd	6	4	6	10	10	9	6	9	11	11	11	11	11	11	11	13	13	13	13	13	13	13	12	12	13	13	12	13	13	13	13	13	12	12
Nyíregyháza	18	15	14	12	13	13	12	13	12	12	12	12	12	12	12	10	12	12	11	12	12	12	13	13	12	12	13	12	12	12	12	12	13	13
Haladás	13	10	12	14	15	16	16	17	16	16	15	13	13	13	14	14	14	14	14	14	14	14	14	14	14	14	14	14	14	14	14	14	14	14
Siófok	12	13	15	17	17	17	17	18	18	17	18	17	18	16	16	15	15	15	15	16	15	15	15	16	16	16	16	17	16	17	15	15	15	15
Videoton	15	16	11	13	14	14	13	14	14	14	16	16	16	17	18	17	17	17	17	15	16	17	16	15	15	15	15	15	15	15	16	16	16	16
BVSC	17	18	17	16	16	18	18	16	17	18	17	18	17	18	17	18	18	18	18	17	18	18	18	18	18	17	17	16	17	16	17	17	17	17
III. Kerület	14	14	18	18	18	15	15	15	15	15	14	15	15	15	15	16	16	16	16	18	17	16	17	17	17	18	18	18	18	18	18	18	18	18

Leader
1999–2000 UEFA Cup Qualifying round
Relegation to 1999–2000 Nemzeti Bajnokság II

Source: NB1 (in Hungarian)

== Results ==
Home \ Away	BVS	DEB	DIÓ	DUN	FTC	GÁZ	GYŐ	HAL	KER	HON	MTK	NYÍ	SIÓ	UTE	VAS	VÁC	VID	ZTE
BVSC		0–1	1–3	3–2	0–1	1–2	2–1	0–3	3–0	3–0	0–2	0–0	0–1	0–3	1–2	2–1	0–1	1–1
Debrecen	3–1		5–0	1–2	6–1	4–0	1–2	1–1	0–0	0–2	3–1	2–0	1–0	0–2	0–0	2–1	5–0	2–0
Diósgyőr	2–1	0–0		1–1	1–3	2–0	1–1	5–1	5–1	0–0	1–1	1–0	1–1	1–1	4–2	0–1	1–0	1–1
Dunaferr	1–1	2–0	2–3		2–1	2–1	0–0	2–0	3–0	2–1	0–3	6–1	2–1	2–0	2–1	1–1	3–1	2–0
Ferencváros	1–0	2–0	3–4	1–3		2–0	1–1	1–0	7–1	0–1	2–2	2–1	2–0	1–0	3–1	2–2	2–0	4–0
Gázszer	0–0	2–1	2–0	3–0	1–1		0–2	4–0	3–2	0–0	1–3	0–0	1–3	2–1	1–1	1–0	0–0	2–0
Győr	1–1	3–1	5–4	2–1	1–2	0–0		2–0	3–0	2–2	1–0	0–1	1–1	3–1	3–3	1–0	3–0	1–0
Haladás	3–1	1–1	2–1	0–1	1–2	1–1	0–1		5–1	0–2	2–1	3–2	2–1	4–1	0–0	0–1	2–0	0–0
III. Kerület	0–0	1–5	1–2	3–1	1–2	2–1	3–3	3–1		1–1	1–5	2–2	2–3	2–3	1–4	2–3	1–2	0–2
Kispest Honvéd	1–5	0–0	3–0	0–0	2–2	1–3	4–0	1–0	2–0		0–2	4–3	3–0	2–3	0–4	2–1	0–0	0–1
MTK Hungária	3–2	1–2	4–0	3–0	2–0	2–0	4–1	2–4	5–0	3–0		2–0	1–0	2–0	2–0	3–1	2–1	2–1
Nyíregyháza	1–0	4–2	3–1	3–1	0–1	0–0	0–0	2–1	3–3	3–0	1–3		3–1	0–2	0–2	3–4	4–2	2–0
Siófok	0–1	0–1	2–1	0–1	0–2	2–2	1–2	1–0	2–1	1–1	0–1	1–1		0–2	2–3	2–4	0–0	0–2
Újpest	3–1	3–2	1–3	3–0	2–1	2–1	1–2	2–0	4–1	3–0	1–2	1–0	2–1		2–0	2–0	1–0	2–2
Vasas	3–2	2–0	0–0	3–2	2–1	2–0	1–4	5–0	0–3	2–1	0–4	1–1	0–0	1–0		0–0	2–1	1–0
Vác	1–0	1–1	1–3	1–0	1–1	1–1	1–0	3–1	1–0	4–1	1–2	2–2	0–2	4–3	1–1		2–1	2–2
Videoton	4–1	1–0	2–3	4–4	1–3	0–2	0–0	0–0	5–0	0–1	0–1	1–0	1–1	0–0	2–2	3–2		1–2
Zalaegerszeg	2–0	3–0	2–1	0–1	1–1	2–0	2–1	3–1	2–1	2–0	0–1	1–0	2–2	0–1	1–0	2–2	4–2	

Source: soccerway.com
Legend: Blue = home team win; Yellow = draw; Red = away team win.

== Statistical leaders ==
=== Top goalscorers ===
Rank	Scorer	Club	Goals
1	(Hungary) Béla Illés	MTK Hungária	22
2	(Romania) Nicolae Ilea	Debreceni VSC-Epona	18
3	(Hungary) Gábor Egressy	Diósgyőri FC	17
4	(Hungary) Attila Korsós	Újpest FC	13
5	(Hungary) Róbert Waltner	Videoton FC	12
5	(Hungary) Zoltán Pál	Vasas SC	12
5	(Hungary) Krisztián Kenesei	MTK Hungária	12
5	(Hungary) István Borgulya	Kispest Honvéd FC	12
5	(Hungary) Imre Szabics	Ferencvárosi TC	12
5	(Hungary) Ferenc Lengyel	Dunaferr SE	12
5	(Hungary) Gábor Zavadszky	Dunaferr SE	12

== Attendances ==
#	Club	Average
1	Diósgyőr	9,706
2	Nyíregyháza Spartacus	9,412
3	Győr	9,294
4	Zalaegerszeg	9,206
5	Ferencváros	7,688
6	Debrecen	5,029
7	Dunaújváros	5,000
8	Szombathelyi Haladás	4,412
9	Vasas	4,118
10	Újpest	4,031
11	Videoton	3,735
12	MTK	3,529
13	Vác	3,276
14	Siófok	2,853
15	III. kerület	2,729
16	Kispest Honvéd	2,676
17	Gázszer	1,918
18	BVSC	1,656

== See also ==
- 1998–99 Magyar Kupa
- 1998–99 Nemzeti Bajnokság II
- 1998–99 Nemzeti Bajnokság III
