= Péter Lendvai =

Hungarian footballer (born 1975)

Personal information
- Date of birth: 21 April 1975 (age 51)
- Place of birth: Budapest, Hungary
- Height: 1.76 m (5 ft 9 in)
- Positions: Striker; forward

Youth career
- –1993: Vasas

Senior career*
| Years | Team | Apps | (Gls) |
| 1993–1995 | Vasas | 12 | (0) |
| 1994–1995 | → Cegléd (loan) | 14 | (3) |
| 1995 | → III. Kerület (loan) | 13 | (3) |
| 1995–1999 | III. Kerület | 101 | (29) |
| 1999–2001 | Videoton | 35 | (14) |
| 2000 | → Siófok (loan) | 8 | (3) |
| 2000–2001 | → Fót (loan) | 16 | (5) |
| 2001–2002 | Pápa | 10 | (0) |
| 2002–2004 | Rákospalota | 71 | (10) |
| 2004–2005 | Club Valencia | | (7) |
| 2005 | BKV Előre | 13 | (3) |
| 2005–2006 | Budakalász | 15 | (4) |
| 2006 | Steinakirchen | | |
| 2006–2007 | Martonvásár | 12 | (0) |
| 2007–2010 | III. Kerület | 49 | (20) |
| Total | | 369 | (101) |

International career
| 1992–1993 | Hungary U18 | 8 | (2) |
| 1996 | Hungary U21 | 4 | (0) |
- * Club domestic league appearances and goals

Péter Lendvai (born 21 April 1975) is a Hungarian former professional footballer who played as a striker and midfielder. He represented Hungary at youth level.

== Club career ==
Born in Budapest, Lendvai began his career with local side Vasas. On 10 April 1993, aged just 17, he made his first team debut by playing the second half of the match of a 2–1 Nemzeti Bajnokság I away loss against Kispest-Honvéd.

On 1 February 1995, Lendvai was loaned out to spend the second half of the season at III. Kerület in the Nemzeti Bajnokság II.

He signed for recently relegated Nemzeti Bajnokság II club Videoton on 28 July 1999, alongside Endre Gáspár. The side went on to win the league, securing an immediate return to the top flight.

In July 2004, Lendvai joined Maldivian club Club Valencia at the invitation of manager László Kiss, and scored seven goals as the club won the Dhivehi League. His spell was cut short by the December 2004 Indian Ocean earthquake and tsunami, which destroyed his rented home and belongings and led to his departure from the country.

== International career ==
Lendvai represented the Hungary national under-18 team at the 1993 UEFA European Under-18 Championship.

== Career statistics ==
=== Club ===
Appearances and goals by club, season and competition
| Club | Season | League | | | National cup (Note: Includes Magyar Kupa) | | Other | | Total | |
| Club | Season | Division | Apps | Goals | Apps | Goals | Apps | Goals | Apps | Goals |
|---|---|---|---|---|---|---|---|---|---|---|
| Vasas | 1992–93 | Nemzeti Bajnokság I | 6 | 0 | — | | — | | 6 | 0 |
| Vasas | 1993–94 | Nemzeti Bajnokság I | 6 | 0 | 2 | 1 | — | | 8 | 1 |
| Vasas | Total | | 12 | 0 | 2 | 1 | — | | 14 | 1 |
| Cegléd (loan) | 1994–95 | Nemzeti Bajnokság III | 14 | 3 | — | | — | | 14 | 3 |
| III. Kerület (loan) | 1994–95 | Nemzeti Bajnokság II | 13 | 3 | — | | — | | 13 | 3 |
| III. Kerület | 1995–96 | Nemzeti Bajnokság II | 24 | 8 | — | | — | | 24 | 8 |
| III. Kerület | 1996–97 | Nemzeti Bajnokság I | 13 | 3 | 5 | 4 | — | | 18 | 7 |
| III. Kerület | 1997–98 | Nemzeti Bajnokság II | 33 | 10 | 4 | 1 | 2 (Note: Appearances in Nemzeti Bajnokság I promotion play-offs) | 0 | 39 | 11 |
| III. Kerület | 1998–99 | Nemzeti Bajnokság I | 31 | 8 | 2 | 0 | — | | 33 | 8 |
| III. Kerület | Total | | 101 | 29 | 11 | 5 | 2 | 0 | 114 | 34 |
| Videoton | 1999–2000 | Nemzeti Bajnokság II | 32 | 14 | 3 | 1 | — | | 35 | 15 |
| Videoton | 2000–01 | Nemzeti Bajnokság I | 3 | 0 | 2 | 2 | — | | 5 | 2 |
| Videoton | Total | | 35 | 14 | 5 | 3 | — | | 40 | 17 |
| Siófok (loan) | 2000–01 | Nemzeti Bajnokság II | 8 | 3 | 1 | 0 | — | | 9 | 3 |
| Fót (loan) | 2000–01 | Nemzeti Bajnokság II | 16 | 5 | — | | — | | 16 | 5 |
| Pápa | 2001–02 | Nemzeti Bajnokság II | 10 | 0 | — | | — | | 10 | 0 |
| Rákospalota | 2001–02 | Nemzeti Bajnokság II | 13 | 1 | — | | — | | 13 | 1 |
| Rákospalota | 2002–03 | Nemzeti Bajnokság II | 27 | 5 | 1 | 0 | — | | 28 | 5 |
| Rákospalota | 2003–04 | Nemzeti Bajnokság II | 31 | 4 | 1 | 2 | 2 | 0 | 34 | 6 |
| Rákospalota | Total | | 71 | 10 | 2 | 2 | 2 | 0 | 75 | 12 |
| Club Valencia | 2004 | Dhivehi League | | 7 | — | | — | | | 7 |
| BKV Előre | 2004–05 | Nemzeti Bajnokság II | 13 | 3 | 2 | 1 | — | | 15 | 4 |
| Budakalász | 2005–06 | Nemzeti Bajnokság II | 15 | 4 | — | | — | | 15 | 4 |
| Martonvásár | 2006–07 | Nemzeti Bajnokság III | 12 | 0 | — | | — | | 12 | 0 |
| III. Kerület | 2007–08 | Nemzeti Bajnokság III | 18 | 6 | | | — | | 18 | 6 |
| III. Kerület | 2008–09 | Nemzeti Bajnokság III | 25 | 11 | 1 | 1 | — | | 26 | 12 |
| III. Kerület | 2009–10 | Megyei Bajnokság I | 6 | 3 | — | | 1 (Note: Appearance in Budapest Kupa) | 1 | 7 | 4 |
| III. Kerület | Total | | 49 | 20 | 1 | 1 | 1 | 1 | 51 | 22 |
| Career total | | | 369 | 101 | 24 | 13 | 5 | 1 | 398 | 115 |

== Honours ==
III. Kerület

- Nemzeti Bajnokság II – East: 1995–96
- Megyei Bajnokság I – Budapest: 2009–10

Videoton

- Nemzeti Bajnokság II: 1999–2000
- Magyar Kupa runner-up: 2000–01

Club Valencia

- Dhivehi League: 2004
