= Roman Bondarenko =

Turkmenistan footballer (born 1966)

Personal information
- Full name: Roman Dmitrievich Bondarenko
- Date of birth: 14 August 1966 (age 60)
- Place of birth: Soviet Union
- Height: 1.82 m (6 ft 0 in)
- Position: Striker

Senior career*
Years	Team	Apps	(Gls)
1987–1999	Torpedo Zaporizhzhia	430	(107)
1999–2000	Metalurh Zaporizhzhia	26	(5)
1999	→ Metalurh-2 Zaporizhzhia	1	(0)
2000–2005	ZAlK Zaporizhzhia		

International career
1998	Turkmenistan	3	(2)
- * Club domestic league appearances and goals

Roman Dmitrievich Bondarenko (Russian: Роман Дмитриевич Бондаренко, born 14 August 1966) is a former Turkmenistani international footballer.

== Club career ==
For most of his career he played as striker for Torpedo Zaporizhia, later Metalurh.

== International career ==
Roman Bondarenko played for Turkmenistan national team at the 1998 Asian Games in Thailand in 1998.

== Personal life ==
His cousin Oleksandr Bondarenko is also a football player, and his son, Taras, is as well.
