= István Hamar =

Hungarian footballer

Personal information
- Full name: István Hamar
- Date of birth: 6 October 1970 (age 56)
- Place of birth: Budapest, Hungary
- Height: 1.81 m (5 ft 11 in)
- Position: Left midfielder

Team information
- Current team: Vecsés FC

Senior career*
Years	Team	Apps	(Gls)
1989–1992	Csepel SC	23	(3)
1992–1996	Budapest Honved	77	(17)
1996–1997	MTK	28	(8)
1997	Vanspor	13	(3)
1997	Vasas SC	2	(0)
1997–2000	Beitar Jerusalem F.C.	118	(21)
2000–2001	Maccabi Netanya F.C.	12	(2)
2001–2003	FC Fehervar	29	(6)
2003–2004	Budapest Honved	20	(4)
2007–2009	Tököl	22	(2)
2009	Vecsés FC	7	(2)
2010	Ladánybene FC		

International career
1993–2001	Hungary	25	(4)
- * Club domestic league appearances and goals

István Hamar (born 6 October 1970 in Budapest) is a Hungarian former football player. In addition to playing for professional teams in Hungary and Israel, he played for the Hungary national team.
