= Zoltán Kenesei =

Hungarian footballer

Personal information
- Full name: Zoltán Kenesei
- Date of birth: 16 September 1972 (age 54)
- Place of birth: Budapest, Hungary
- Height: 1.78 m (5 ft 10 in)
- Position: Midfielder

Youth career
- Volán FC

Senior career*
Years	Team	Apps	(Gls)
1990–1991	Borsod Volán	12	(0)
1991–1992	Rákospalotai EAC		
1992–1993	Szombathelyi Haladás	42	(2)
1994	MTK Budapest FC	27	(3)
1995	MATÁV Sopron	6	(0)
1995–1996	Hapoel Beit She'an	12	(0)
1996	Csepel SC	7	(0)
1997–2000	Szegedi LC	92	(29)
2000–2001	KF Tirana	34	(7)
2002	Partizani Tirana	10	(0)
2002–2003	AEK Larnaca	30	(6)
2004	Diósgyőri VTK	16	(2)
2004–2005	Nyíregyháza Spartacus	11	(3)
- * Club domestic league appearances and goals

Zoltán Kenesei (born 16 September 1972, in Hungary) is a Hungarian former professional footballer.
