= Tibor Csehi =

Hungarian footballer (born 1963)

Personal information
- Date of birth: 27 March 1963 (age 63)
- Place of birth: Kalocsa, Hungary
- Height: 1.78 m (5 ft 10 in)
- Position: Midfielder

Youth career
- 1975–1980: Dunaújváros Kohász

Senior career*
Years	Team	Apps	(Gls)
1980–1981	Dunaújváros Kohász	7	(0)
1982–1983	Budapest Honvéd	5	(0)
1983–1984	Nyíregyháza Spartacus	15	(6)
1987–1992	Budapest Honvéd	94	(20)
1992–1993	Nyíregyháza Spartacus	5	(1)
1993–1995	Budapest Honvéd	0	
1995–1996	Nyíregyhaza Spartacus		
1996–1997	Békéscsaba Előre		(0)

International career
1989–1991	Hungary	3	(0)
- * Club domestic league appearances and goals

Tibor Csehi (born 27 March 1963) is a Hungarian former professional footballer who played as a midfielder.
