= Zsolt Máriási =

Hungarian footballer

Personal information
- Date of birth: 14 October 1967 (age 59)
- Place of birth: Ózd, Hungary
- Height: 1.81 m (5 ft 11 1/2 in)
- Position: Midfielder

Senior career*
Years	Team	Apps	(Gls)
1986–1991	Videoton	119	(8)
1991–1992	BFC Siófok	24	(2)
1992–1993	Rába ETO Győr	10	(1)
1993–1994	Diósgyőri VTK	9	(3)
1994–1997	Vasas Budapest	82	(15)
1997–1998	NK Osijek	2	(0)

International career
1988–1990	Hungary	5	(0)
- * Club domestic league appearances and goals

Zsolt Máriási (born 14 October 1967 in Ózd) is a retired Hungarian international football midfielder.

He played most of his career with Videoton FC. In the early 1990s he played for other Hungarian top league clubs such as Győri ETO FC, Diósgyőri VTK and Vasas SC. In 1997, he moved abroad to Croatia where he played one season with NK Osijek in Croatian First League.

Between 1988 and 1990 Zsolt Máriási played five matches for the Hungary national team.

== External sources ==
- Zsolt Máriási at National-Football-Teams.com
