= Lajos Schróth =

Hungarian footballer (born 1960)

Personal information
- Date of birth: 28 August 1960 (age 66)
- Place of birth: Budapest, Hungary
- Position: Striker

Senior career*
Years	Team	Apps	(Gls)
1984–1989	Újpesti Dózsa	129	(13)
1989–1990	Cádiz CF	10	(1)
1992	FC Haka	13	(2)
- * Club domestic league appearances and goals

Lajos Schróth (born 28 August 1960) is a Hungarian retired professional footballer who played in Hungary for Újpesti Dózsa, in Spain for Cádiz CF and in Finland for FC Haka.
