= Zsolt Fehér =

Hungarian footballer

Personal information
- Date of birth: 15 June 1975 (age 51)
- Place of birth: Szolnok, Hungary
- Height: 1.90 m (6 ft 3 in)
- Position: Defender

Team information
- Current team: Tápiószele SE

Youth career
- Szolnoki MÁV FC

Senior career*
Years	Team	Apps	(Gls)
1996–1997	BVSC Budapest	15	(0)
1997–2000	Szolnoki MÁV FC	?	(?)
2000–2002	Bőcs KSC	?	(?)
2002–2004	Békéscsabai Előre FC	22	(1)
2004–2006	Tápiógyörgye FC	?	(?)
2006–2007	Jászberényi SE	11	(2)
2007–	Tápiószele SE	58	(9)

International career
1996–1997	Hungary U-21	3	(0)
- * Club domestic league appearances and goals as of 10 July 2012

Zsolt Fehér (born 15 June 1975) is a Hungarian footballer who plays for Tápiószele SE as a defender. He finished his career playing in the NB II with Jászberény SE.
