= Anatoliy Grytsayuk =

Ukrainian footballer (born 1969)

Personal information
- Date of birth: 23 June 1969 (age 57)
- Place of birth: Rovno, Ukrainian SSR, Soviet Union
- Height: 1.75 m (5 ft 9 in)
- Positions: Forward; midfielder

Senior career*
Years	Team	Apps	(Gls)
- Nyva Berezhany
–1992	Veres Rivne		
1992–1994	Békéscsaba	40	(6)
1994–2000	Vasas	93	(7)
2000–2001	Rákospalota	49	(0)
2002–2004	Kistarcsa	38	(2)
Total		220	(15)
- * Club domestic league appearances and goals

Anatoliy Grytsayuk (born 23 June 1969) is a Ukrainian professional footballer who played as a forward and midfielder.

== Career ==
=== Békéscsaba ===
On 6 January 1992, Grytsayuk has left Ukrainian First League club Veres Rivne and joined Nemzeti Bajnokság II East Group club Békéscsaba in Hungary with Yuriy Ushmaev. At the end of the season, the club became champions and were promoted to the Nemzeti Bajnokság I. In the 1993–94 Nemzeti Bajnokság I season, Békéscsaba finished third, with Grytsayuk scoring one goal during the season. On 31 March 1994, he transferred to Vasas.

=== Vasas ===
On 29 May 2000, Grytsayuk was among the players who were bid farewell by Vasas.

=== Rákospalota ===
Grytsayuk joined Nemzeti Bajnokság II club Rákospalota in June 2000. On 15 December 2001, the club stated that it would no longer require his services in the future.

== Career statistics ==
Appearances and goals by club, season and competition
Club	Season	League			National cup (Note: Includes Magyar Kupa)		Europe		Total	
Club	Season	Division	Apps	Goals	Apps	Goals	Apps	Goals	Apps	Goals
Békéscsaba	1991–92	Nemzeti Bajnokság II	14	5			—		14	5
Békéscsaba	1992–93	Nemzeti Bajnokság I	17	0	8	5	—		25	5
Békéscsaba	1993–94	Nemzeti Bajnokság I	9	1	3	0	—		12	1
Békéscsaba	Total		40	6	11	5	—		51	11
Vasas	1993–94	Nemzeti Bajnokság I	8	2	1	0	—		9	2
Vasas	1994–95	Nemzeti Bajnokság I	14	2	6	1	—		20	3
Vasas	1995–96	Nemzeti Bajnokság I	18	2	6	0	3 (Note: Appearances in UEFA Intertoto Cup)	0	27	2
Vasas	1996–97	Nemzeti Bajnokság I	23	1	2	0	3	0	28	1
Vasas	1997–98	Nemzeti Bajnokság I	18	0	3	0	—		21	0
Vasas	1998–99	Nemzeti Bajnokság I	12	0	2	0	—		14	0
Vasas	1999–2000	Nemzeti Bajnokság I	—		—		4	0	4	0
Vasas	Total		93	7	20	1	10	0	123	8
Rákospalota	2000–01	Nemzeti Bajnokság II	33	0	—		—		33	0
Rákospalota	2001–02	Nemzeti Bajnokság II	16	0	1	0	—		17	0
Rákospalota	Total		49	0	1	0	—		50	0
Kistarcsa	2001–02	Nemzeti Bajnokság III	9	1	—		—		9	1
Kistarcsa	2002–03	Nemzeti Bajnokság III	29	1	—		—		29	1
Kistarcsa	2003–04	Nemzeti Bajnokság III			1	0	—		1	0
Kistarcsa	Total		38	2	1	0	—		39	2
Career total			220	15	33	6	10	0	263	21

== Honours ==
Békéscsaba

- Nemzeti Bajnokság II – East: 1991–92
