= László Farkasházy =

Hungarian footballer

Personal information
- Date of birth: 27 January 1968 (age 58)
- Place of birth: Budapest, Hungary
- Height: 1.85 m (6 ft 1 in)
- Position: Midfielder

Senior career*
Years	Team	Apps	(Gls)
1985–1989	BVSC Budapest	124	(28)
1989–1990	VfL Bochum	8	(0)
1990–1993	BVSC Budapest	42	(10)
1993–1994	Kispest Honvéd	6	(0)
1994–1998	MTK Budapest	116	(23)
1998–1999	Vasas SC	29	(3)
2000–2001	Kecskemét	8	(0)
2001	BKV Előre SC	4	(0)
Total		337	(64)

International career
1995–1997	Hungary	7	(0)
- * Club domestic league appearances and goals

László Farkasházy (born 27 January 1968) is a Hungarian former professional footballer who played as a midfielder.
