= Daniel Usvat =

Romanian footballer

Personal information
- Date of birth: 2 November 1973 (age 52)
- Place of birth: Oradea, Romania
- Height: 1.73 m (5 ft 8 in)
- Position: Midfielder

Senior career*
Years	Team	Apps	(Gls)
1992–1995	Bihor Oradea (Note: The statistics for the 1992–93 and 1993–94 Divizia B seasons are unavailable.)	32	(5)
1995–1996	Farul Constanța	3	(0)
1996–1997	Haladás	27	(4)
1997–1999	BVSC	53	(5)
1999–2000	Cegléd	17	(0)
2000	Nagykanizsa	11	(2)
2000–2001	Videoton	27	(3)
2002–2004	Siófok (Note: The statistics for the 2001–02 Nemzeti Bajnokság II season are unavailable.)	49	(5)
2004	Lombard Pápa	3	(1)
2005	Putnok		
2005–2008	Tiszalök		
Total		222	(25)
- * Club domestic league appearances and goals as of 26 July 2012

Daniel Usvat (born 2 November 1973) is a Romanian former football player who played as a midfielder. He started his career at Bihor Oradea and Farul Constanța. Subsequently, Usvat moved to Hungary, where he spent the remainder of his career playing for teams such as Haladás, BVSC, Cegléd, Nagykanizsa, Videoton, Siófok, Lombard Pápa, Putnok and Tiszalök.

== Career ==
Usvat was born on 2 November 1973 in Oradea, Romania. He began playing football in 1992 at local club Bihor in Divizia B. After scoring five goals in 32 matches during the 1994–95 season, he was transferred to Farul Constanța. There, Usvat made his Divizia A debut on 2 March 1996 when coach Florin Marin sent him in the 32nd minute to replace Dennis Șerban in a 2–1 away loss to Dinamo București. He made a total of three appearances until the end of the season.

In the summer of 1996, Usvat joined Hungarian side Haladás. He made his Nemzeti Bajnokság I debut on 12 August under coach István Mihalecz in a 1–0 away win over Vác. On 4 September, he scored his first goal in the competition in a 2–0 victory against BVSC. Until the end of the season, he netted three more goals, including one in a 6–0 success over Ferencváros and others during losses to Újpest and Siófok. Subsequently, Usvat went to play for BVSC, scoring a goal in his first match, a 2–1 win over Debrecen. He also played in all four games during the 1997–98 Cup Winners' Cup campaign, as they advanced past Balzers in the qualifying round, being defeated by Real Betis in the next round. At the end of the 1998–99 season, BVSC was relegated. Usvat left the club and joined Nemzeti Bajnokság II side Cegléd. In 2000, he returned to first league football, signing with Nagykanizsa. He scored two goals for them in a 1–0 victory against Videoton and a 3–1 loss to Debrecen, but the team suffered a relegation. Then he went to play for Videoton. Usvat helped them reach the 2000–01 Magyar Kupa final, where he played the entire match under coach Péter Várhidi in the 5–2 loss to Debrecen. In 2002, he joined second league side Siófok and helped them earn first-league promotion at the end of the season. Afterwards, in August 2002, Usvat netted three goals in three consecutive victories against Békéscsaba, MATÁV Sopron and Dunaferr. In the last round of the season, he scored the victory goal in the 2–1 win over Győr. However, during the 2003–04 season, Usvat scored only once when he opened the score in a 4–0 away win over Ferencváros. In 2004, Usvat joined Lombard Pápa where he scored on his debut in a 3–1 victory against Diósgyőr. On 21 August 2004, he made his last Nemzeti Bajnokság I appearance during Lombard's 1–0 away loss to MTK Budapest, totaling 170 matches with 20 goals in the competition.

From 2005 to 2008, Usvat played in the Hungarian lower leagues for Putnok and Tiszalök, retiring afterwards.

== Honours ==
Videoton

- Magyar Kupa runner-up: 2000–01

Siófok

- Nemzeti Bajnokság II: 2001–02
