= Sándor Preisinger =

Hungarian footballer and manager

Sandor Preisinger
Personal information
- Date of birth: 11 December 1973 (age 52)
- Place of birth: Zalaegerszeg, Hungary
- Height: 1.85 m (6 ft 1 in)
- Position: Striker

Team information
- Current team: Fehérvár (assistant coach)

Senior career*
Years	Team	Apps	(Gls)
1992–1996	Zalaegerszegi TE	98	(50)
1996–2000	MTK Hungária FC	75	(18)
2000	K.F.C. Verbroedering Geel	14	(2)
2000–2001	MFC Sopron	32	(7)
2001–2002	Haladás FC	30	(11)
2002–2003	Győri ETO	-	(-)
2003–2004	Nyíregyháza Spartacus	-	(-)

International career
1996	Hungary U23	2	(0)
1999–2000	Hungary	5	(0)

Managerial career
- 2012–2013: Zalaegerszegi TE
- 2020: Hungary U19
- 2020–2021: Békéscsaba 1912 Előre
- 2022–: Fehérvár (assistant)
- * Club domestic league appearances and goals

Sandor Preisinger (born 11 December 1973) is a Hungarian football coach and a former player. He is an assistant coach with Fehérvár.

Sandor was a member of the Hungary squad that reached the 1996 Summer Olympics finals in Atlanta, USA.

He played 186 matches in the Hungarian First Division and scored a total of 64 goals. In the season 1994/95, Sandor Preisinger was the top scorer of the Hungarian league with 21 goals while playing for Zalaegerszegi TE.

He started his international career with Hungary on 5 June 1999 against Romania in a EURO 2000 qualifier match.

== Honours ==
Hungarian League:
Winner: 1997, 1999
Runner-Up: 2000

Hungarian Cup:
Winner: 1997, 1998, 2000
Runner-up: 2002
