= Balázs Bérczy =

Hungarian footballer

Personal information
- Full name: Balázs Bérczy
- Date of birth: 15 January 1966 (age 60)
- Place of birth: Pécs, Hungary
- Height: 1.81 m (5 ft 11 in)
- Position: Midfielder

Team information
- Current team: BVSC Budapest

Senior career*
Years	Team	Apps	(Gls)
1985–1990	Pécsi MFC	135	(23)
1991	K.F.C. Germinal Beerschot	10	(0)
1991	Volán FC	8	(2)
1991–1992	Budapest Honvéd FC	21	(0)
1992–1999	Újpest FC	133	(20)
1999	BVSC Budapest	13	(1)
1999–2000	BKV Előre SC	14	(2)

International career
1987–1994	Hungary	5	(0)
- * Club domestic league appearances and goals

Balázs Bérczy (born 15 January 1966 in Pécs) is a former Hungarian football player who currently is the managing director of Pécsi Mecsek FC.
