= Tamás Szamosi =

Hungarian footballer

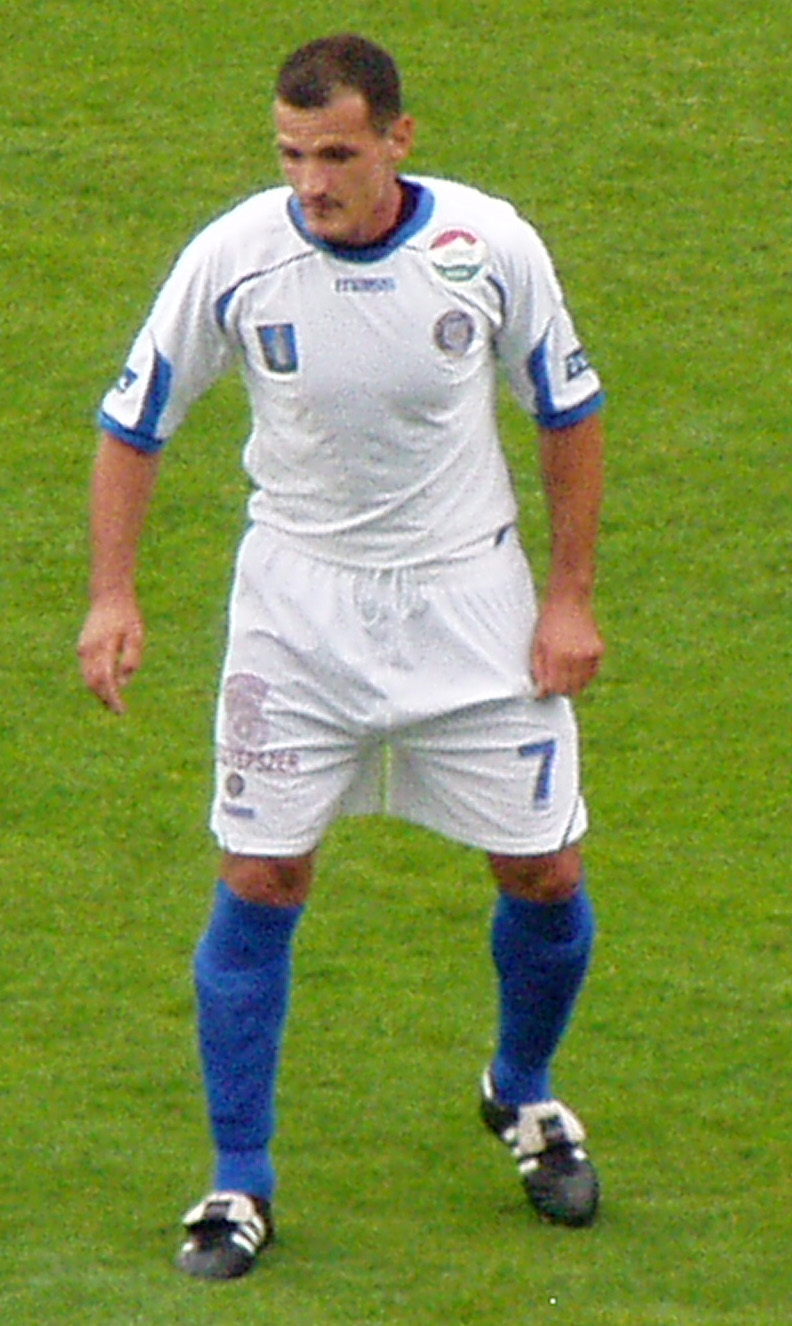

Personal information
- Full name: Tamás Szamosi
- Date of birth: 27 November 1974 (age 51)
- Place of birth: Budapest, Hungary
- Height: 1.78 m (5 ft 10 in)
- Position: Defender

Team information
- Current team: Szigetszentmiklósi TE

Senior career*
Years	Team	Apps	(Gls)
1995–1997	III. Kerületi TUE	59	(4)
1997–2001	MTK Hungária FC	92	(1)
2001–2005	Zalaegerszegi TE	101	(1)
2005–2008	Nea Salamina	73	(3)
2008–2009	Zalaegerszegi TE	29	(0)
2009–2010	Pécsi MFC	24	(0)
2011–2013	Szigetszentmiklósi TE	59	(1)

International career
2001–2002	Hungary	3	(0)
- * Club domestic league appearances and goals

Tamás Szamosi (born 27 November 1974) is a Hungarian defender who playing for Szigetszentmiklósi TE. His former teams are Nea Salamina, III. Kerületi TUE, MTK Hungária FC and Zalaegerszegi TE.
