= Csaba Balog =

Hungarian football player

Personal information
- Date of birth: 24 October 1972 (age 54)
- Place of birth: Törökszentmiklós, Hungary
- Height: 1.78 m (5 ft 10 in)
- Position: Midfielder

Youth career
- 1986–1994: Zalaegerszegi TE

Senior career*
Years	Team	Apps	(Gls)
1994–1997	Nagykanizsai TE	43	(8)
1997–1999	Szombathelyi Haladás	65	(3)
1999–2005	Zalaegerszegi TE	196	(6)
2005–2006	FC Ajka	13	(0)
2006–2007	Hévíz FC	14	(0)
- * Club domestic league appearances and goals

Csaba Balog (born 24 October 1972 in Törökszentmiklós) is a Hungarian football (midfielder) player who has spent most of his career playing for Zalaegerszegi TE.
