= Krisztián Kenesei =

Hungarian footballer

Personal information
- Full name: Krisztián Kenesei
- Date of birth: 7 January 1977 (age 49)
- Place of birth: Budapest, Hungary
- Height: 1.78 m (5 ft 10 in)
- Position: Striker

Team information
- Current team: Vasas
- Number: 20

Senior career*
Years	Team	Apps	(Gls)
1993–2000	MTK	177	(67)
2000–2001	Győr	30	(15)
2001–2003	Zalaegerszeg	68	(44)
2003–2006	Beijing Guoan	36	(12)
2005	→ Győr (loan)	28	(14)
2007	Vasas	10	(6)
2007–2008	Avellino	22	(8)
2008–2013	Haladás	92	(42)
2013–2015	Pápa	36	(5)
2015	Vasas	19	(4)
2016–2018	III. Kerület	52	(30)
2018–2020	Komárom	43	(17)

International career
1996–1999	Hungary U-21	4	(0)
2000–2005	Hungary	29	(9)
- * Club domestic league appearances and goals

Krisztián Kenesei (born 7 January 1977) is a Hungarian former professional footballer.

== Club career ==
Kenesei started his career at MTK Hungária, where he played 9 years. He then moved to Győri ETO and Zalaegerszeg, before signed by Beijing Guoan on 25 August 2003. He was offered a 3-year contract at the end of 2003 season. Kenesei was loaned back to Győri ETO in 2005.

In January 2007, he was allowed to sign by Vasas, and on 30 July 2007, he was signed by newly promoted Serie B team Avellino. For the 2008/09 season he will play for Szombathelyi Haladás.

== International career ==
Kenesei played for Hungary but after he returned to China in 2006 he did not receive any call-up. Kenesei played 7 games in UEFA Euro 2004 qualifying.

== Career statistics ==
=== International ===
Appearances and goals by national team and year
National team	Year	Apps	Goals
Hungary	2000	1	0
Hungary	2002	9	3
Hungary	2003	9	2
Hungary	2004	4	3
Hungary	2005	5	1
Total		28	9

Scores and results list Hungary's goal tally first, score column indicates score after each Kenesei goal.

List of international goals scored by Krisztián Kenesei
No.	Date	Venue	Opponent	Score	Result	Competition	Ref.
1	27 March 2002	Republican Stadium, Chișinău, Moldova	Moldova	1–0	2–0	Friendly	
2	17 April 2002	Oláh Gábor utcai Stadion, Debrecen, Hungary	Belarus	1–0	2–5	Friendly	
3	12 October 2002	Råsunda Stadium, Stockholm, Sweden	Sweden	1–0	1–1	UEFA Euro 2004 qualifying	
4	30 April 2003	Szusza Ferenc Stadion, Budapest, Hungary	Luxembourg	4–1	5–1	Friendly	
5	11 June 2003	San Marino Stadium, Serravalle, San Marino	San Marino	3–0	5–0	UEFA Euro 2004 qualifying	
6	19 February 2004	Tsirio Stadium, Limassol, Cyprus	Latvia	2–1	2–1	Friendly	
7	31 March 2004	Ferenc Puskás Stadium, Budapest, Hungary	Wales	1–0	1–2	Friendly	
8	1 June 2004	TEDA Soccer Stadium, Tianjin, China	China	1–0	1–2	Friendly	
9	16 November 2005	Karaiskakis Stadium, Piraeus, Greece	Greece	1–1	1–2	Friendly	

== Honours ==
=== Club ===
MTK Budapest FC

- Hungarian League: 1996–97, 1998–99
- Hungarian Cup: 1996–97, 1997–98, 1999–00

Zalaegerszeg

- Hungarian League: 2001–02

Beijing Guoan

- Chinese FA Cup: 2003
- Chinese Super Cup: 2003

=== Individual ===
- Hungarian Top scorer: 2002–03
