= Tamás Szekeres =

Hungarian footballer

Personal information
- Full name: Tamás Szekeres
- Date of birth: 18 September 1972 (age 54)
- Place of birth: Budapest, Hungary
- Height: 1.82 m (6 ft 0 in)
- Position: Defender

Senior career*
Years	Team	Apps	(Gls)
1990–1995	Ferencvárosi TC	82	(6)
1995–99	MTK Budapest	86	(7)
1999	Újpest FC	15	(3)
1999–2000	KAA Gent	22	(2)
2000–01	Energie Cottbus	0	(0)
2001	Strømsgodset IF	5	(0)
2002–04	Debreceni VSC	63	(8)
2004–05	MFC Sopron	26	(1)
2005–06	Tromsø IL	20	(1)
2006–07	Fredrikstad FK	11	(0)

International career
1994–2003	Hungary	6	(0)

Managerial career
- 2007–2010: Hungary (Technical Manager)
- * Club domestic league appearances and goals

Tamás Szekeres (born 18 September 1972, in Budapest) is a Hungarian former football player.

== Honours ==
- Nemzeti Bajnokság I (4): 1992, 1995, 1997, 1999
- Magyar Kupa (7): 1991, 1993, 1994, 1995, 1997, 1998, 2005
- Szuperkupa (3): 1993, 1994, 1995
- Norwegian Cup (1): 2006
