= Krisztián Csillag =

Hungarian footballer

Personal information
- Full name: Krisztián Csillag
- Date of birth: 13 June 1975 (age 51)
- Place of birth: Kazincbarcika, Hungary
- Height: 1.76 m (5 ft 9 in)
- Position: Midfielder

Team information
- Current team: Vecsési FC

Youth career
- Kazincbarcikai SC
- Diósgyőri VTK
- MTK Budapest FC

Senior career*
| Years | Team | Apps | (Gls) |
| 1995–1996 | MTK Budapest FC | 21 | (0) |
| 1997 | III. Kerületi TUE | 6 | (1) |
| 1997–1999 | BVSC Budapest | 52 | (2) |
| 1999–2000 | Újpest FC | 24 | (3) |
| 2000 | FC Fehérvár | 3 | (0) |
| 2001 | MTK Budapest FC | 0 | (0) |
| 2001 | BKV Előre SC | ? | (?) |
| 2002–2003 | Százhalombattai LK | 36 | (1) |
| 2003–2004 | FC Dabas | ? | (?) |
| 2004–2005 | Nyíregyháza Spartacus | 10 | (2) |
| 2005–2009 | Vecsési FC | 63 | (5) |
| 2009– | Budaörsi SC | 21 | (3) |

International career
| 1996–1997 | Hungary U-21 | 2 | (0) |
- * Club domestic league appearances and goals as of 11 February 2010

Krisztián Csillag (born 13 June 1975) is a Hungarian footballer who played for BVSC Budapest as midfielder.
