= Zoltán Molnár (footballer, born 1973) =

Hungarian footballer

Personal information
- Full name: Zoltán Molnár
- Date of birth: 4 November 1973 (age 52)
- Place of birth: Budapest, Hungary
- Height: 1.70 m (5 ft 7 in)
- Position: Full back

Senior career*
Years	Team	Apps	(Gls)
1992–1995	Újpest		
1995–1996	BVSC		
1996–1999	MTK Budapest		
1999–2002	Dunaferr		
2002–2004	MTK Budapest		
2004–2006	Vasas	44	(2)
2006–2008	Paksi	46	(2)
2008–2011	Szolnoki MÁV FC	13	(8)
2011–	Veszprém	51	(2)
- * Club domestic league appearances and goals as of 5 November 2012 (UTC)

Zoltán Molnár (born 4 November 1973 in Budapest) is a Hungarian football defender. During his career, Molnár has played for Újpest, BVSC, Dunaferr, Vasas, Paksi and Szolnoki MÁV FC. He currently plays for Veszprém.
