= Oleksandr Bondarenko (footballer, born 1966) =

Ukrainian footballer

Personal information
- Full name: Oleksandr Mykolayovych Bondarenko
- Date of birth: 29 June 1966 (age 60)
- Place of birth: Zaporizhia, Ukrainian SSR, Soviet Union
- Height: 1.83 m (6 ft 0 in)
- Position: Defender

Senior career*
Years	Team	Apps	(Gls)
1983–1984	Metalurh Zaporizhya	1	(0)
1987	Tavriya Simferopol	47	(5)
1988–1991	Metalurh Zaporizhya	120	(5)
1991	Temp Shepetivka	16	(3)
1992	Torpedo Zaporizhia	26	(1)
1993–1994	Chornomorets Odesa	24	(0)
1994	→ Chornomorets-2 Odesa	2	(0)
1994–1999	BVSC Budapest	138	(6)
1999	Chornomorets Odesa	3	(0)
1999	→ Chornomorets-2 Odesa	6	(0)
2000	Zirka Kirovohrad	21	(2)
2001–2003	Dniester Ovidiopol	59	(18)
2003–2004	Real Odesa	9	(1)
2004	Ivan Odesa	2	(0)
Total		474	(41)

International career
1992	Ukraine	2	(0)

Managerial career
- 2006–2008: Real Pharma Odesa
- 2016: Real Pharma Odesa
- * Club domestic league appearances and goals

Oleksandr Mykolayovych Bondarenko (Ukrainian: Олександр Миколайович Бондаренко; born 29 June 1966) is a retired Ukrainian football player.

== Career ==
He played in Hungary for BVSC Budapest. He also played in FC Torpedo Zaporizhia along with his cousin, Roman, who spent almost ten years as the forward there. When there started financial troubles for BVSC Budapest (bankrupt since 2001) he returned to Odesa together with Oleksandr Nikiforov, and later back to the central Ukraine.

== Personal life ==
His cousin Roman Bondarenko is also a retired football player.
