= Szőnyi úti Stadion =

Football stadium in Budapest, Hungary

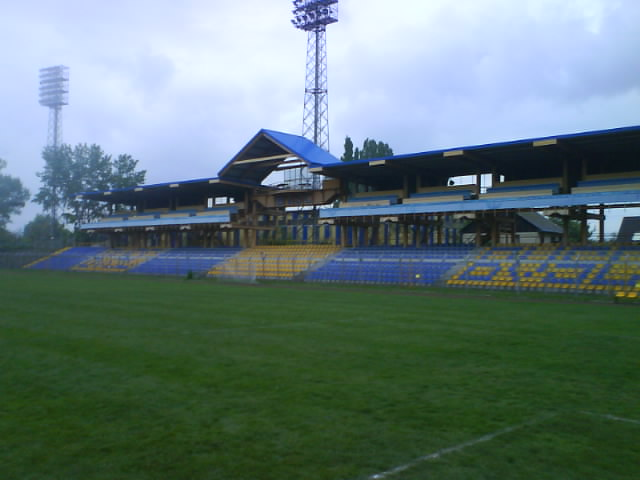
- Interactive map of Szőnyi úti Stadion
- Location: Zugló, Budapest, Hungary
- Coordinates: 47°31′25″N 19°05′30″E
- Owner: BVSC Budapest
- Capacity: 12,000
- Field size: 105 × 68 m

Tenants
- BVSC Budapest; Budapest Wolves; FC Tatabánya

Szőnyi úti Stadion is a sports stadium in Zugló, Budapest, Hungary. The stadium is home to the association football side BVSC Budapest. The stadium has a capacity of 12,000.

== History ==
On 2 April 2015, three new artificial pitches were inaugurated at the sports centre of the club. One of the pitches is 40 x 60 metres and the two other pitches are 22 x 40 metres in size. The cost of the construction of the new pitches was 150 million Hungarian forints. The investment was financed by the Hungarian Football Federation (70%) and by the Zugló Local Government.

== Attendance ==
=== Records ===
Record Attendance:

- 12,000 BVSC Budapest v Újpest FC, September 1994.
