= Csaba Madar =

Hungarian footballer

Personal information
- Full name: Csaba Madar
- Date of birth: 8 October 1974 (age 52)
- Place of birth: Hungary
- Position: Midfielder

Senior career*
Years	Team	Apps	(Gls)
1992–1997	Debreceni VSC		
1997–2003	MTK Hungária FC		
2003–2007	Debreceni VSC		
2007	Nyíregyháza Spartacus		
2007	REAC		
2008	Nyíregyháza Spartacus		
2009	Báránd		

International career
1996	Hungary	3	(0)
- * Club domestic league appearances and goals

Csaba Madar (born 8 October 1974) is a Hungarian former football player who last played for Báránd. He signed with them on 31 May 2005.

He was in the Hungary national team at the 1996 Summer Olympics in Atlanta, where Hungary failed to progress from the group stage.

He previously played for Debreceni VSC, MTK Hungária FC, Nyíregyháza Spartacus, REAC and Hajdúszoboszló.
