= László Vágner =

Hungarian football referee

- Born: December 24, 1955 (age 70); Gávavencsellő, Hungary

Domestic
Years	League	Role
1989-1998	NB I	Referee

International
Years	League	Role
1991-1998	FIFA-listed	Referee

László Vágner (born December 24, 1955, in Gávavencsellő) is a Hungarian former football referee.

He refereed two matches in the 1998 FIFA World Cup in France: Scotland v Norway at the Parc de Lescure in Bordeaux, and Chile v Cameroon at the Stade de la Beaujoire in Nantes which ended in controversial circumstances as he denied Cameroon a potentially winning goal and dished out two red cards to Cameroon.
