= Gábor Halmai =

Hungarian footballer

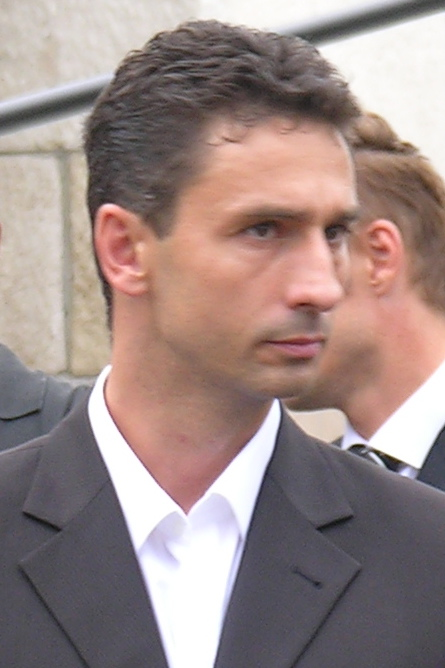

Personal information
- Date of birth: 7 January 1972 (age 54)
- Place of birth: Hungary
- Height: 1.88 m (6 ft 2 in)
- Position: Defensive midfielder

Senior career*
Years	Team	Apps	(Gls)
1989–1991	Videoton FC Fehérvár	32	(1)
1991–1993	Kispest Honvéd FC	54	(9)
1993–1996	Germinal Ekeren	74	(13)
1996–2000	MTK Hungária FC	88	(9)
2000–2003	Hapoel Tel Aviv F.C.	89	(10)
2003–2005	MTK Hungária FC	14	(1)

International career
1993–2001	Hungary	57	(4)
- * Club domestic league appearances and goals

Gábor Halmai (born 7 January 1972) is a retired Hungarian football player.

He made his debut for the Hungary national team in 1993, and got 57 caps and 4 goals until 2001.

== International goals ==
#	Date	Venue	Opponent	Score	Result	Competition
	7 September 1994	Nepstadion, Budapest, Hungary	Turkey	2–0	2–2	1996 ECQ
	26 April 1995	Nepstadion, Budapest, Hungary	Sweden	1–0	1–0	1996 ECQ
	19 March 1997	Valletta, Malta	Malta	0–2	1–4	1998 WCQ
	10 September 1997	Nepstadion, Budapest, Hungary	Azerbaijan	2–0	3–1	1998 WCQ

== Honours ==
- Hungarian League: 1993, 1997, 1999; Runner up 2000
- Hungarian Cup: 1997, 1998, 2000
- Belgian Cup: Runner-up 1995
- Toto Cup (Ligat ha'Al/Liga Leumit): 2002
