= Ferenc Orosz =

Hungarian footballer

Personal information
- Full name: Ferenc Orosz
- Date of birth: 11 October 1969 (age 57)
- Place of birth: Budapest, Hungary
- Position: Striker

Senior career*
Years	Team	Apps	(Gls)
1989–1990	Budapest Honvéd FC	10	(1)
1990–1991	Dorogi FC	12	(5)
1991–1992	Dunakanyar-Vác FC	28	(16)
1992–1995	Budapest Honvéd FC	66	(21)
1995–1996	BVSC Budapest	27	(15)
1996–1999	MTK Budapest FC	67	(31)
1999–2001	Dunaújváros FC	42	(11)

International career^{‡}
1991–1997	Hungary	17	(3)
- * Club domestic league appearances and goals ‡ National team caps and goals as of 25 February 2012

Ferenc Orosz (born 11 October 1969) is a retired Hungarian footballer. He was a member of the Hungary national football team from 1991 to 1997.
