= Emil Lőrincz =

Hungarian footballer

Personal information
- Date of birth: 29 September 1965 (age 61)
- Place of birth: Budapest
- Position: Defender

Senior career*
| Years | Team | Apps | (Gls) |
| 1983–1990 | MTK | | |
| 1990–1995 | R.W.D. Molenbeek | | |
| 1995–2000 | MTK | | |

International career
| 1990–1997 | Hungary | 37 | (3) |

Managerial career
- 2014: Zalaegerszegi TE
- * Club domestic league appearances and goals

Emil Lőrincz (born 29 September 1965) is a retired Hungarian football defender.
