= Gábor Egressy (footballer) =

Hungarian footballer

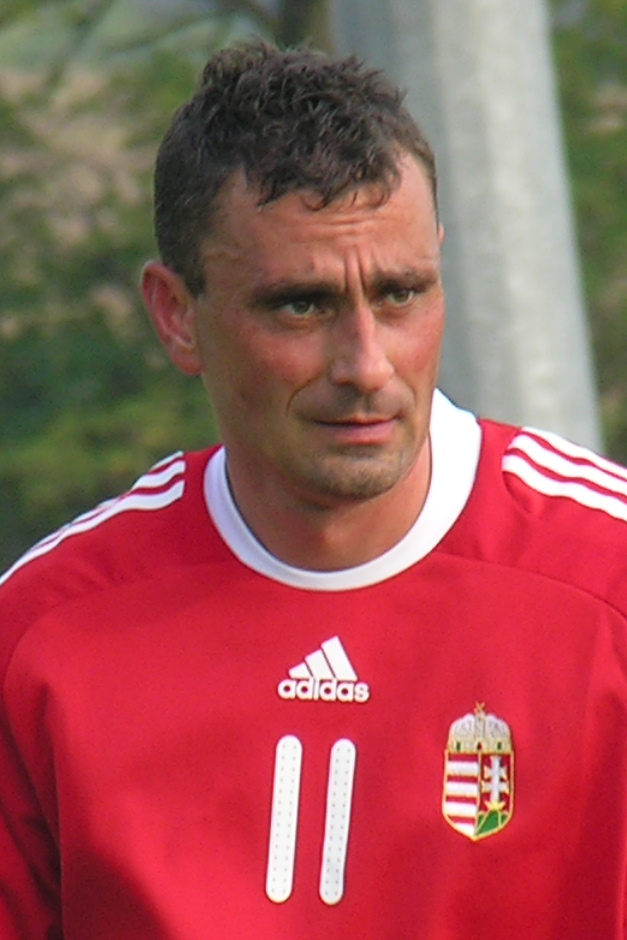

Personal information
- Date of birth: 11 February 1974 (age 52)
- Place of birth: Budapest, Hungary
- Height: 1.85 m (6 ft 1 in)
- Position: Left midfielder

Senior career*
Years	Team	Apps	(Gls)
1993–1996	Újpest FC	76	(21)
1996–1997	BVSC Budapest	24	(5)
1997–1998	MTK Hungária FC	33	(1)
1998–1999	Diósgyőri VTK	31	(17)
1999–2000	MTK Hungária FC	27	(6)
2000–2001	Budapest Honvéd FC	4	(4)
2001–2004	Zalaegerszegi TE	98	(32)
2004–2005	Diósgyőri VTK	23	(10)
2005–2006	VfB Admira Wacker Mödling	10	(1)
2006	Diagoras GS	?	(?)
2007	SC Ritzing	?	(?)
2007–	1. Wiener Neustädter SC	?	(?)

International career
1996–2001	Hungary	21	(1)
- * Club domestic league appearances and goals

Gábor Egressy (born 11 February 1974) is a Hungarian former football player.

== International ==
He has 21 caps for the Hungary national team and progressed at the 1996 Summer Olympics in Atlanta to the group stage.

== Honours ==
- Nemzeti Bajnokság I: 2002; Runner up 2000
- Magyar Kupa: 1998, 2000; Runner up 1996
