= Béla Illés =

Hungarian footballer

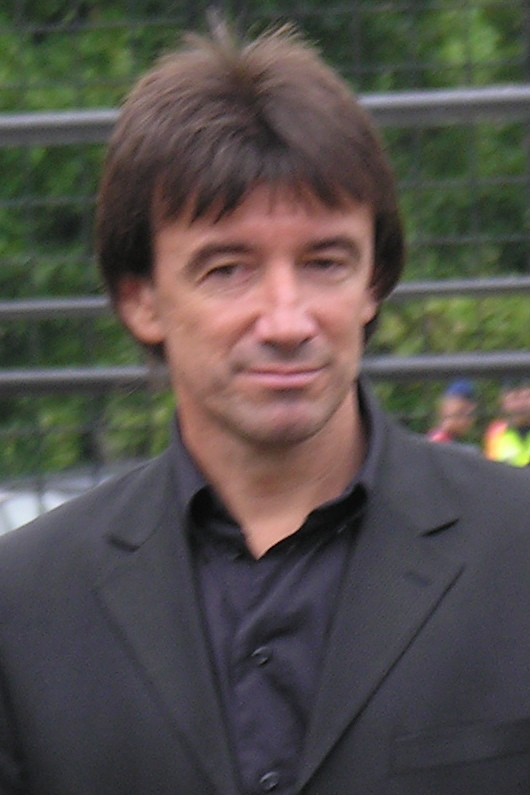

Personal information
- Date of birth: 27 April 1968 (age 58)
- Place of birth: Sárvár, Hungary
- Height: 1.85 m (6 ft 1 in)
- Position: Attacking midfielder

Team information
- Current team: Szombathelyi Haladás (Chairman)

Youth career
- Sárvári Kinizsi

Senior career*
Years	Team	Apps	(Gls)
1986–1992	Haladás VSE	119	(25)
1992–1995	Kispest Honvéd FC	81	(31)
1995–2006	MTK Hungária FC	318	(155)
2004	→ Haladás VSE (loan)	14	(1)
Total		529	(212)

International career^{‡}
1991–2001	Hungary	64	(15)
- * Club domestic league appearances and goals as of 1 June 2007 ‡ National team caps and goals as of 1 June 2007

Béla Illés (Hungarian: [ˈbeːlɒ ˈilleːʃ]; born 27 April 1968 in Sárvár, Hungary) is a retired Hungarian football player who has spent most of his career playing for MTK Hungária FC. He is considered to be the greatest Hungarian footballer of the 1990s.

He was only 19 when Haladás VSE made a move for him during the 1986–1987 season and he made his debut to the NB1 against Tatabánya on 19 October 1986.

He is currently the chairman and part-owner of Szombathelyi Haladás VSE.

== Honours ==
=== Club ===
Budapest Honvéd

- Hungarian League: 1993

MTK Hungária FC

- Hungarian League: 1997, 1999, 2003
  - Runner-up: 2000
- Hungarian Cup: 1997, 1998, 2000
- Hungarian Super Cup: 2003

=== Personal honours ===
- Top Goalscorer: 1994; 1997; 1999
- Player of the Year in Hungary: 1994; 1997; 1998

== International goals ==
International Goals
	Date	Venue	Opponent	Score	Result	Competition
1	23 March 1994	Linz	Austria	1–1	Draw	Friendly
2	1 June 1994	Eindhoven	Netherlands	1–7	Loss	Friendly
3	29 March 1995	Budapest	Switzerland	2–2	Draw	UEFA Euro 1996 Qual.
4	11 November 1995	Budapest	Iceland	1–0	Win	UEFA Euro 1996 Qual.
5	10 September 1997	Budapest	Azerbaijan	3–1	Win	FIFA World Cup 1998 Qual.
6	29 October 1997	Budapest	FR Yugoslavia	1–7	Loss	FIFA World Cup 1998 Qual.
7	25 March 1998	Vienna	Austria	3–2	Win	Friendly
8	25 March 1998	Vienna	Austria	3–2	Win	Friendly
9	20 April 1998	Teheran	Iran	2–0	Win	LG Cup
10	10 October 1998	Baku	Azerbaijan	4–0	Win	UEFA Euro 2000 Qual.
11	10 March 1999	Budapest	Bosnia and Herzegovina	1–1	Draw	Friendly
12	27 March 1999	Budapest	Liechtenstein	5–0	Win	UEFA Euro 2000 Qual.
13	3 June 2000	Budapest	Israel	2–1	Win	Friendly
14	16 August 2000	Budapest	Austria	1–1	Draw	Friendly
15	11 October 2000	Kaunas	Lithuania	6–1	Win	FIFA World Cup 2002 Qual.
