= Hungary national football team results (1990–1999) =

This article provides details of international football games played by the Hungary national football team from 1990 to 1999.

== Results ==
Key
Win
Draw
Defeat

=== 1990 ===
20 March 1990 Friendly	Hungary	2–0	United States	Budapest, Hungary
	Petres; Limperger			Stadium: Stadion Albert Flórián; Attendance: 9,000

28 March 1990 Friendly	Hungary	1–3	France	Budapest, Hungary
	Pintér 38' (pen.)	Match Report	Cantona 27', 67'; Sauzée 70'	Stadium: Népstadion; Attendance: 12,000; Referee: Tadeusz Diakonowicz (Poland)

11 April 1990 Friendly	Austria	3–0	Hungary	Austria

28 May 1990 Friendly	Hungary	3–0	United Arab Emirates	France

2 June 1990 Friendly	Hungary	3–1	Colombia	Budapest, Hungary
	Bognár 7'; Kovács 15', 60'	Report	Rincón 30'	Stadium: Fáy Utcai Stadion; Attendance: 4,000; Referee: Zvi Sharir (Israel)

5 September 1990 Friendly	Hungary	4–1	Turkey	Megyeri úti Stadion, Budapest
	Kovács 3'; Kozma 5'; Kiprich 8', 74' (pen.)	(Report)	54' Çolak	Attendance: 1,500; Referee: (Poland) Michał Listkiewicz

12 September 1990 Friendly	England	1–0	Hungary	London, England
	Lineker 44'	Report		Stadium: Wembley; Attendance: 51,459; Referee: Erik Fredriksson (Sweden)

=== 1991 ===
17 January 1991 Nehru Gold Cup	India	1–2	Hungary	Trivandrum, India
	Pappachan 43'	Report	Balog 50' (pen.); Jován 75'	Stadium: Chandrasekharan Nair Stadium; Attendance: 20,000; Referee: Welly Chikuka (Zambia)

19 February 1991 Friendly	Argentina	2–0	Hungary	Argentina

27 March 1991 Friendly	Spain	2–4	Hungary	El Sardinero, Santander
	Manolo 44' (pen.); Carlos 84'		42', 59' Kiprich; 53', 89' Emil Lőrincz	Attendance: 21,000; Referee: (Switzerland) Arturo Martino

11 September 1991 Friendly	Hungary	1–2	Republic of Ireland	Hungary

9 October 1991 Friendly	Hungary	0–2	Belgium	Székesfehérvár
			Emmers 7'; Scifo 75'	Stadium: Stadion Sóstói; Attendance: 7,000; Referee: Itzhak Ben Itzhak (Israel)

4 December 1991 Friendly	Mexico	3–0	Hungary	Mexico

8 December 1991 Friendly	El Salvador	1–1	Hungary	El Salvador

=== 1992 ===
25 March 1992 Friendly	Hungary	2–1	Austria	Hungary

29 April 1992 Friendly	Ukraine	1–3	Hungary	Uzhhorod, Ukraine
	Kovalets (yellow card) 71'; Hetsko 90'	Report	Mónos (yellow card) 16'; Sallói (yellow card) 17'; Salloi 61'; Kiprich 68', 84' (pen.)	Stadium: Avanhard Stadium; Attendance: 11,000; Referee: Vadim Zhuk (Belarus)

12 May 1992 Friendly	Hungary	0–1	England	Budapest, Hungary
		Report	Webb 56'	Stadium: Népstadion; Attendance: 25,000; Referee: Heinz Holzmann (Austria)

27 May 1992 Friendly	Sweden	2–1	Hungary	Sweden

3 June 1992 1994 World Cup qualification	Hungary	1–2	Iceland	Népstadion, Budapest
	K. Kovács 3'	Report	Orlygsson 51'; Magnússon 73'	Attendance: 11,000; Referee: Angelo Amendolia (Italy)

26 August 1992 Friendly	Hungary	2–1	Ukraine	Nyíregyháza, Hungary
	Fischer (penalty missed) 12' (pen.); Cseh (yellow card) 72'; Sallói (yellow card) 75'; K.Kovács 82'; Nagy 89'	Report	Hudymenko 35'; Hudymenko (yellow card) 39'; Leonenko (red card) 57'; Yudin (yellow card) 89'	Stadium: Városi Stadion; Attendance: 8,000; Referee: Octavian Streng (Romania)

9 September 1992 1994 World Cup qualification	Luxembourg	0–3	Hungary	Josy Barthel Stadium, Luxembourg
		Report	Détári 15'; K. Kovács 53', 78'	Attendance: 3,026; Referee: Loizos Loizou (Cyprus)

23 September 1992 Friendly	Hungary	0–0	Israel	Stadion Albert Flórián, Budapest
		Report		Attendance: 3,000

11 October 1992 Friendly	Qatar	1–4	Hungary	Qatar

13 October 1992 Friendly	Qatar	1–1	Hungary	Qatar

11 November 1992 1994 World Cup qualification	Greece	0–0	Hungary	Kaftanzoglio Stadium, Thessaloniki
		Report		Attendance: 35,367; Referee: Philip Don (England)

=== 1993 ===
7 March 1993 1993 Kirin Cup	Japan	0–1	Hungary	Japan
		Report

10 March 1993 1993 Kirin Cup	United States	0–0	Hungary	Nagoya, Japan
		Report		Stadium: Mizuho Athletic Stadium; Attendance: 12,500

31 March 1993 1994 World Cup qualification	Hungary	0–1	Greece	Népstadion, Budapest
		Report	Apostolakis 70' (pen.)	Attendance: 20,000; Referee: Hellmut Krug (Germany)

5 April 1993 Friendly	Hungary	0–2	Sweden	Hungary

28 April 1993 1994 World Cup qualification	Russia	3–0	Hungary	Luzhniki Stadium, Moscow
	Kanchelskis 55'; Kolyvanov 60'; Yuran 85'	Report		Attendance: 25,000; Referee: Guy Goethals (Belgium)

29 May 1993 Friendly	Republic of Ireland	2–4	Hungary	Ireland

16 June 1993 1994 World Cup qualification	Iceland	2–0	Hungary	Laugardalsvöllur, Reykjavík
	Sverrisson 13'; Gudjohnsen 77'	Report		Attendance: 2,755; Referee: Rémi Harrel (France)

8 September 1993 1994 World Cup qualification	Hungary	1–3	Russia	Üllői úti Stadion, Budapest
	Klausz 20'	Report	Piatnitski 14'; Kiriakov 53'; Borodiuk 89'	Attendance: 6,000; Referee: Gheorghe Constantin (Romania)

27 October 1993 1994 World Cup qualification	Hungary	1–0	Luxembourg	Üllői úti Stadion, Budapest
	Détári 20'	Report		Attendance: 1,500; Referee: Oğuz Sarvan (Turkey)

=== 1994 ===
9 March 1994 Friendly	Hungary	1–2	Switzerland	Hungary

23 March 1994 Friendly	Austria	1–1	Hungary	Austria

6 April 1994 Friendly	Hungary	0–1	Slovenia	Szombathely, Hungary
		Report	Katanec 27'	Stadium: Rohonci út Attendance: 4,000; Referee: Robert Sedlacek (Austria)

20 April 1994 Friendly	Denmark	3–1	Hungary	Denmark

4 May 1994 Friendly	Poland	3–2	Hungary	Poland

18 May 1994 Friendly	Hungary	2–2	Croatia	Győr, Hungary
	Keresztúri 51', 73'; Kovacs (yellow card) 40'; Halmai (yellow card) 53'	Report	Mladenović 52', 62'; Jerkan (yellow card) 20'	Stadium: FC Raba ETO; Attendance: 5,000; Referee: Lubomír Puček (Czech Republic)

1 June 1994 Friendly	Netherlands	7–1	Hungary	Eindhoven, Netherlands
	Bergkamp 13', 88'; Roy 18'; R. Koeman 19' (pen.); Taument 47'; Rijkaard 59', 79'		Illes 8' (pen.)	Stadium: Philips Stadion; Attendance: 27,450; Referee: Elleray (England)

8 June 1994 Friendly	Belgium	3–1	Hungary	Brussels, Belgium
	Goal		Goal

7 September 1994 UEFA Euro 1996 qualifying	Hungary	2–2	Turkey	Budapest, Hungary
20:00 UTC+2	Kiprich 4'; Halmai 43'	Report	Şükür 67'; Korkmaz 72'	Stadium: Népstadion; Attendance: 20,000; Referee: Pierluigi Pairetto (Italy)

12 October 1994 Friendly	Hungary	0–0	Germany	Hungary

16 November 1994 UEFA Euro 1996 qualifying	Sweden	2–0	Hungary	Stockholm, Sweden
19:00 UTC+1	Brolin 43'; Dahlin 70'	Report		Stadium: Råsunda Stadium; Attendance: 27,571; Referee: Mario van der Ende (Netherlands)

14 December 1994 Friendly	Mexico	5–1	Hungary	Mexico

=== 1995 ===
8 March 1995 Friendly	Hungary	3–1	Latvia	Budapest, Hungary
17:00 UTC+1	Hamar 46', 53'; Csertői 65'	Report	Zemļinskis 68' (pen.)	Stadium: Illovszky Rudolf Stadion; Attendance: 3,000; Referee: Radislav Rabrenović (Yugoslavia)

29 March 1995 UEFA Euro 1996 qualifying	Hungary	2–2	Switzerland	Népstadion, Budapest
20:15 UTC+2	Kiprich 50'; Illés 72'	Report	Subiat 74', 84'	Attendance: 13,000; Referee: Alfred Wieser (Austria)

26 April 1995 UEFA Euro 1996 qualifying	Hungary	1–0	Sweden	Népstadion, Budapest
20:05 UTC+2	Halmai 2'	Report		Attendance: 8,300; Referee: Antonio Jesús Lõpez Nieto (Spain)

11 June 1995 UEFA Euro 1996 qualifying	Iceland	2–1	Hungary	Laugardalsvöllur, Reykjavík
20:00 UTC	Bergsson 61'; S.Jónsson 66'	Report	Vincze 20'	Attendance: 4,474; Referee: Alain Sars (France)

6 September 1995 UEFA Euro 1996 qualifying	Turkey	2–0	Hungary	BJK İnönü Stadium, Istanbul
20:00 UTC+3	Şükür 9', 31'	Report		Attendance: 25,358; Referee: Václav Krondl (Czech Republic)

11 October 1995 UEFA Euro 1996 qualifying	Switzerland	3–0	Hungary	Hardturm, Zürich
20:30 UTC+1	Türkyilmaz 22'; Sforza 56'; Ohrel 90'	Report		Attendance: 21,000; Referee: Charles Agius (Malta)

11 November 1995 UEFA Euro 1996 qualifying	Hungary	1–0	Iceland	Stadion Rudolf Illovszky, Budapest
17:00 UTC+1	Illés 56'	Report		Attendance: 1,120; Referee: Georgios Bikas (Greece)

=== 1996 ===
10 April 1996 Friendly	Croatia	4–1	Hungary	Osijek, Croatia
	Brajković 6'; Šuker 23'; Pamić 65'; Stanić 75'	Report	Nagy 39'	Stadium: Stadion Gradski vrt Attendance: 15,000; Referee: Bohdan Benedik (Slovakia)

24 April 1996 Friendly	Hungary	0–2	Austria	Budapest, Hungary
18:00 UTC+2				Stadium: Népstadion

18 May 1996 Friendly	England	3–0	Hungary	London, England
15:00 UTC+1	Anderton 38', 62'; Platt 52'	Report		Stadium: Wembley; Attendance: 34,184; Referee: Markus Merk (Germany)

1 June 1996 Friendly	Hungary	0–2	Italy	Budapest, Hungary
20:30 CEST (UTC+02:00)		Report	Casiraghi 7'; Bánfi 47' (o.g.)	Stadium: Népstadion; Attendance: 25,000; Referee: Mateo Beusan (Croatia)

14 August 1996 Friendly	Hungary	3–1	United Arab Emirates	Siófok, Hungary
19:00 UTC+2				Stadium: Bányász Stadion

1 September 1996 1998 World Cup qualification	Hungary	1–0	Finland	Budapest, Hungary
18:30 UTC+2	Orosz 15'	Report		Stadium: Népstadion; Attendance: 14,500; Referee: Hartmut Strampe (Germany)

9 October 1996 1998 World Cup qualification	Norway	3–0	Hungary	Ullevaal, Oslo
20:00 UTC+2	Rekdal 83', 89', 90' (pen.)	Report		Attendance: 22,480; Referee: Hugh Dallas (Scotland)

10 November 1996 1998 World Cup qualification	Azerbaijan	0–3	Hungary	Tofik Bakhramov Stadium, Baku
16:00 UTC+4		Report	Nyilas 42', 67' (pen.); Urbán 77'	Attendance: 30,000; Referee: Dragutin Poljak (Croatia)

=== 1997 ===
19 March 1997 International friendly	Malta	1–4	Hungary	Ta' Qali, Malta
	Keresztúri 74' (o.g.)	Report	Urbán 18'; Halmai 40'; Orosz 66'; Plókai 88'	Stadium: Ta' Qali National Stadium; Attendance: 1,039; Referee: Robert Boggi (Italy)

2 April 1997 Friendly	Hungary	1–3	Australia	Budapest, Hungary
	Klausz 31'		4', 90' A. Vidmar; 90' Muscat	Stadium: Nepstadion; Attendance: 15,000; Referee: (Germany) Hermann Albrecht

30 April 1997 1998 World Cup qualification	Switzerland	1–0	Hungary	Hardturm, Zürich
20:15 UTC+2	Türkyilmaz 83'	Report		Attendance: 17,300; Referee: Leif Sundell (Sweden)

8 June 1997 1998 World Cup qualification	Hungary	1–1	Norway	Nepstadion, Budapest
20:00 UTC+2	Kovács 22'	Report	Rudi 9'	Attendance: 25,300; Referee: David Elleray (England)

6 August 1997 International friendly	Hungary	3–0	Malta	Siófok, Hungary
	Kovács 47'; Sebők 57'; Lipcsei 90'	Report		Stadium: Bányász Stadion; Attendance: 5,646; Referee: Jacek Granat (Poland)

20 August 1997 1998 World Cup qualification	Hungary	1–1	Switzerland	Nepstadion, Budapest
18:30 UTC+2	Klausz 52'	Report	Chapuisat 90+1'	Attendance: 40,000; Referee: Michel Piraux (Belgium)

6 September 1997 Friendly	Poland	1–0	Hungary	Poland

10 September 1997 1998 World Cup qualification	Hungary	3–1	Azerbaijan	Nepstadion, Budapest
19:30 UTC+2	Klausz 8'; Halmai 44'; Illés 89'	Report	Lychkin 71'	Attendance: 8,112; Referee: Atanas Uzunov (Bulgaria)

11 October 1997 1998 World Cup qualification	Finland	1–1	Hungary	Olympiastadion, Helsinki
19:00 UTC+3	Sumiala 63'	Report	Moilanen 90+1' (o.g.)	Attendance: 31,617; Referee: Bernd Heynemann (Germany)

29 October 1997 1998 World Cup qualification	Hungary	1–7	FR Yugoslavia	Stadion Albert Flórián, Budapest
20:00 UTC+1	Illés 88'	Report	Brnović 2'; Đukić 6'; Savićević 10'; Mijatović 26', 41', 51'; Milošević 63'	Attendance: 13,175; Referee: Vítor Melo Pereira (Portugal)

15 November 1997 1998 World Cup qualification	FR Yugoslavia	5–0	Hungary	Stadion Crvena Zvezda, Belgrade
17:00 UTC+1	Milošević 18'; Mijatović 44', 45' (pen.), 71', 88'	Report		Attendance: 48,498; Referee: Metin Tokat (Turkey)

=== 1998 ===
25 March 1998 Friendly	Austria	2–3	Hungary	Austria

20 April 1998 1998 LG Cup Semi-final	Iran	0–2	Hungary	Azadi Stadium, Tehran
18:00		Report	Korsós 15'; Illés 57'	Attendance: 60,000; Referee: Mahmoud Al-Rifaee (Syria)

22 April 1998 1998 LG Cup Final	Hungary	0–0 (a.e.t.) (4–2 p)	Macedonia	Teheran, Iran
13:00 CEST		Report		Stadium: Azadi Stadium; Attendance: 20,000; Referee: Gholam Ali Hamirad (Iran)
	Penalties
	Illés (penalty scored); Mátyus (penalty missed); Váczi (penalty scored); Korsós (penalty scored); Vincze (penalty scored)		Hristov (penalty missed); Stojanoski (penalty scored); Šakiri (penalty missed); Šainovski (penalty scored)

27 May 1998 Friendly	Hungary	1–0	Lithuania	Nyiregyhaza, Hungary

19 August 1998 Friendly	Hungary	2–1	Slovenia	Zalaegerszeg, Hungary
	Dombi 69'; Sebők 85' (pen.)	Report	Ačimovič 90+1'	Stadium: ZTE Arena; Attendance: 12,000; Referee: Manfred Schüttengruber (Austria)

6 September 1998 UEFA Euro 2000 qualifying	Hungary	1–3	Portugal	Népstadion, Budapest
20:30 UTC+2	Horváth 32'	Report	Sá Pinto 56', 76'; Rui Costa 84'	Attendance: 50,000; Referee: Urs Meier (Switzerland)

10 October 1998 UEFA Euro 2000 qualifying	Azerbaijan	0–4	Hungary	Tofiq Bahramov Stadium, Baku
17:00 UTC+5		Report	Dárdai 59'; Illés 85' (pen.); Pisont 88'; Fehér 90'	Attendance: 7,500; Referee: Stéphane Bré (France)

14 October 1998 UEFA Euro 2000 qualifying	Hungary	1–1	Romania	Népstadion, Budapest
20:15 UTC+2	Hrutka 82'	Report	Moldovan 50'	Attendance: 25,000; Referee: Kim Milton Nielsen (Denmark)

18 November 1998 Friendly	Hungary	2–0	Switzerland	Hungary

=== 1999 ===
10 March 1999 Friendly	Hungary	1–1	Bosnia and Herzegovina	Budapest, Hungary
	Illés 65' (pen.)	Report	Kodro 38'	Attendance: 7,792; Referee: Martin Ingvarsson (Sweden)

27 March 1999 UEFA Euro 2000 qualifying	Hungary	5–0	Liechtenstein	Üllői úti Stadion, Budapest
19:30 UTC+1	J. Sebők 17'; V. Sebők 33', 42', 86' (pen.); Illés 74'	Report		Attendance: 9,534; Referee: Costas Kapitanis (Cyprus)

31 March 1999 UEFA Euro 2000 qualifying	Slovakia	0–0	Hungary	Tehelné pole, Bratislava
18:00 UTC+2		Report		Attendance: 19,452; Referee: Claude Colombo (France)

28 April 1999 Friendly	Hungary	1–1	England	Budapest, Hungary
20:15 CEST (UTC+02)	Hrutka 76'	Report	Shearer 21' (pen.)	Stadium: Népstadion; Attendance: 20,000; Referee: Lutz Michael Fröhlich (Germany)

5 June 1999 UEFA Euro 2000 qualifying	Romania	2–0	Hungary	Stadionul Steaua, Bucharest
21:00 UTC+3	Ilie 2'; D. Munteanu 15'	Report		Attendance: 23,000; Referee: Rune Pedersen (Norway)

9 June 1999 UEFA Euro 2000 qualifying	Hungary	0–1	Slovakia	ETO Park, Győr
20:15 UTC+2		Report	Fabuš 53'	Attendance: 18,300; Referee: Manuel Díaz Vega (Spain)

18 August 1999 Friendly	Hungary	1–1	Moldova	Budapest, Hungary
	Vilmos 39'	Report	Cleşcenco 65'	Stadium: Üllői úti Stadion; Attendance: 5,000; Referee: Wolfgang Sowa (Austria)

4 September 1999 UEFA Euro 2000 qualifying	Liechtenstein	0–0	Hungary	Rheinpark Stadion, Vaduz
20:15 UTC+2		Report		Attendance: 1,650; Referee: Sten Kaldma (Estonia)

8 September 1999 UEFA Euro 2000 qualifying	Hungary	3–0	Azerbaijan	Üllői úti Stadion, Budapest
20:15 UTC+2	Sebők 28'; Egressy 51'; Sowunmi 55'	Report		Attendance: 2,910; Referee: Sašo Lazarevski (Macedonia)

9 October 1999 UEFA Euro 2000 qualifying	Portugal	3–0	Hungary	Estádio da Luz, Lisbon
18:30 UTC+1	Rui Costa 15' (pen.); João Pinto 16'; Abel Xavier 58'	Report		Attendance: 65,000; Referee: Kim Milton Nielsen (Denmark)
