= Ukraine national football team results (1992–2009) =

This is a list of the Ukraine national football team results from 1992 to 2009 (Matches 1 – 162).

== Results ==
Key to background colours
– indicates Ukraine won the match
– indicates Ukraine's opposition won the match
– indicates the match ended in a draw

=== 1992 ===
| 29 April 1992 Friendly | Ukraine | 1–3 | Hungary | Uzhhorod, Ukraine |
| | Kovalets (yellow card) 71'; Hetsko 90' | Report | Mónos (yellow card) 16'; Sallói (yellow card) 17'; Salloi 61'; Kiprich 68', 84' (pen.) | Stadium: Avanhard Stadium; Attendance: 11,000; Referee: Vadim Zhuk (Belarus) |

| 27 June 1992 Friendly | United States | 0–0 | Ukraine | Piscataway, New Jersey, United States |
| 17:00 (UTC−4) | | Report | | Stadium: Rutgers Stadium; Attendance: 11,815; Referee: Michael Caulfield (Ireland) |

| 26 August 1992 Friendly | Hungary | 2–1 | Ukraine | Nyíregyháza, Hungary |
| | Fischer (penalty missed) 12' (pen.); Cseh (yellow card) 72'; Sallói (yellow card) 75'; K.Kovács 82'; Nagy 89' | Report | Hudymenko 35'; Hudymenko (yellow card) 39'; Leonenko (red card) 57'; Yudin (yellow card) 89' | Stadium: Városi Stadion; Attendance: 8,000; Referee: Octavian Streng (Romania) |

| 28 October 1992 Friendly | Belarus | 1–1 | Ukraine | Minsk, Belarus |
| 17:30 (UTC+2) | Antanovich (yellow card) 27'; Gotsmanov 49'; Lesun (yellow card) 83' | Report | Sak (yellow card) 49'; Bezhenar (yellow card) 74'; Maksymov 79' | Stadium: Dinamo Stadium; Attendance: 10,000; Referee: Alexey Spirin (Russia) |

=== 1993 ===
| 27 April 1993 Friendly | Ukraine | 1–1 | Israel | Odesa, Ukraine |
| 18:00 (UTC+3) | Bezhenar (yellow card); Konovalov 78' | Report; Report | Schwartz (yellow card) 12'; Banin (yellow card) 15'; R.Harazi 55'; A.Harazi (yellow card) 72'; Hazan (yellow card) 83' | Stadium: Chornomorets Stadium; Attendance: 8,200; Referee: Nikolai Levnikov (Russia) |

| 18 May 1993 Friendly | Lithuania | 1–2 | Ukraine | Vilnius, Lithuania |
| 18:30 (UTC+3) | Zdančius 4'; Baltušnikas (yellow card); Zdančius (yellow card) | Report | Leonenko 18'; Mykhailenko 22'; Mykhailenko (yellow card); Leonenko (yellow card) | Stadium: Žalgiris Stadium; Attendance: 1,200; Referee: Algirdas Dubinskas (Lithuania) |

| 25 June 1993 Friendly | Croatia | 3–1 | Ukraine | Zagreb, Croatia |
| 20:15 (UTC+2) | Šuker 13'; Adžić 47'; Adžić (yellow card); Šuker (yellow card); Bičanić 83' | Report | Diryavka (yellow card) 38'; Husin 57'; Bezhenar (yellow card) 85' | Stadium: Maksimir Stadium; Attendance: 26,070; Referee: Darko Jamšek (Slovenia) |

| 16 October 1993 North American tour | United States | 1–2 | Ukraine | High Point, North Carolina, United States |
| 14:00 (UTC−4) | Pérez (Dooley) 26' | Report | Leonenko 41', 43' | Stadium: A. J. Simeon Stadium; Attendance: 4,298; Referee: Helder Dias (USA) |

| 20 October 1993 North American tour | Mexico | 2–1 | Ukraine | San Diego, United States |
| | Salvador 14'; Galindo 35' | Report | Alves 33' (o.g.) | Stadium: Jack Murphy Stadium; Attendance: 53,829; Referee: Helder Dias (USA) |

| 23 October 1993 North American tour | United States | 0–1 | Ukraine | Bethlehem, Pennsylvania, United States |
| 14:00 (UTC−4) | | Report | Popov 36' | Stadium: Goodman Stadium; Attendance: 7,896; Referee: Jack D`Aquila (USA) |

=== 1994 ===
| 15 March 1994 Friendly | Israel | 1–0 | Ukraine | Haifa, Israel |
| | Banin 40' (pen.) | Report | Khomyn (yellow card); Turianskyi (yellow card) | Stadium: Kiryat Eliezer Stadium; Attendance: 40,000; Referee: Daud Suheil (Israel) |

| 25 May 1994 Friendly | Ukraine | 3–1 | Belarus | Kyiv, Ukraine |
| 19:00 (UTC+3) | Vasylytchuk (yellow card) 18'; Leonenko 62'; Bezhenar 65' (pen.); Mykhailenko 82' | Report | Herasimets (yellow card) 21'; Belkevich 45' | Stadium: Republican Stadium; Attendance: 12,000; Referee: Kostyantyn Panchyk (Ukraine) |

| 3 June 1994 Friendly | Bulgaria | 1–1 | Ukraine | Sofia, Bulgaria |
| 19:00 (UTC+3) | Sirakov 18'; Ivanov (yellow card) | Report | Mykhaylenko (yellow card); Sak 55' | Stadium: Vasil Levski National Stadium; Attendance: 30,000; Referee: Adrian Porumboiu (Romania) |

| 26 August 1994 Friendly | United Arab Emirates | 1–1 | Ukraine | Grassau, Germany |
| | Bakheet 45' | Report | Finkel 90' | Stadium: Fußballplätze Brandstätt; Attendance: 1,000; Referee: Hermann Albrecht (Germany) |

| 7 September 1994 UEFA Euro 1996 qualifying | Ukraine | 0–2 | Lithuania | Kyiv, Ukraine |
| 19:00 (UTC+3) | | Report | Ivanauskas 53'; Skarbalius 61' | Stadium: Republican Stadium; Attendance: 20,000; Referee: Bo Karlsson (Sweden) |

| 11 September 1994 Friendly | South Korea | 1–0 | Ukraine | Gangneung, South Korea |
| 10:00 | Han Jung-Gook (yellow card) 35'; Hong Myung-bo 77' (pen.) | Report | Pokhlebayev (yellow card) 24' (red card) 55' | Stadium: Gangneung Stadium; Attendance: 22,000; Referee: Kim Young Joo (South Korea) |

| 13 September 1994 Friendly | South Korea | 2–0 | Ukraine | Seoul, South Korea |
| 12:10 | Lee Young-jin (yellow card) 30'; Ha Seok-Joo (yellow card) 32'; Shin Beom-Cheol (yellow card) 34'; Kim Do-Hoon 64'; Hwang Sun-hong 85' | Report | Diryavka (yellow card) 6'; Kryventsov (yellow card) 23' | Stadium: Dongdaemun Stadium; Attendance: 40,000; Referee: Han Nam Shik (South Korea) |

| 12 October 1994 UEFA Euro 1996 qualifying | Ukraine | 0–0 | Slovenia | Kyiv, Ukraine |
| 19:00 (UTC+3) | Kovalets (yellow card) 73'; Diryavka (yellow card) 81' | Report | Udovič (penalty missed) 60'; Židan (yellow card) 85'; Čeh (yellow card) 87' | Stadium: Republican Stadium; Attendance: 15,000; Referee: Atanas Uzunov (Bulgaria) |

| 13 November 1994 UEFA Euro 1996 qualifying | Ukraine | 3–0 | Estonia | Kyiv, Ukraine |
| 17:00 (UTC+2) | Konovalov 30'; Bezhenar (yellow card) 32'; Kirs 45' (o.g.); Huseinov 72' | Report | Kristal (yellow card) 75' | Stadium: Republican Stadium; Attendance: 2,000; Referee: Léon Schelings (Belgium) |

=== 1995 ===
| 25 March 1995 UEFA Euro 1996 qualifying | Croatia | 4–0 | Ukraine | Zagreb, Croatia |
| | Boban 13'; Šuker 20', 79'; Jerkan (yellow card) 51'; Jurčević (yellow card) 65'; Prosinečki 70' (pen.) | Report | Telesnenko (yellow card) 40'; Tyapushkin (yellow card) 70' | Stadium: Maksimir Stadium; Attendance: 25,000; Referee: Hans-Jürgen Weber (Germany) |

| 29 March 1995 UEFA Euro 1996 qualifying | Ukraine | 0–2 | Italy | Kyiv, Ukraine |
| | Khomyn (yellow card) 16' | Report | Lombardo 11'; Zola 37'; Di Matteo (yellow card) 83' | Stadium: Republican Stadium; Attendance: 10,000; Referee: Sándor Puhl (Hungary) |

| 26 April 1995 UEFA Euro 1996 qualifying | Estonia | 0–1 | Ukraine | Tallinn, Estonia |
| | Kallaste (yellow card) 67' | Report | Huseinov 17'; Naduda (yellow card) 69'; Konovalov (yellow card) 86' | Stadium: Kadriorg Stadium; Attendance: 1,100; Referee: Tore Hollung (Norway) |

| 11 June 1995 UEFA Euro 1996 qualifying | Ukraine | 1–0 | Croatia | Kyiv, Ukraine |
| | Kalitvintsev 13'; Pokhlebayev (yellow card) 45'; Horilyi (yellow card) 74' | Report | Pavličić (yellow card) 18'; Gabric (red card) 28'; Asanović (yellow card) | Stadium: Republican Stadium; Attendance: 8,000; Referee: Kurt Röthlisberger (Switzerland) |

| 6 September 1995 UEFA Euro 1996 qualifying | Lithuania | 1–3 | Ukraine | Vilnius, Lithuania |
| | Sukristov (yellow card) 10'; Maciulevičius 17' | Report | Kalitvintsev (yellow card) 4'; Horilyi (yellow card) 53'; Huseinov 66', 70'; Holovko (yellow card) 81'; Husin 83' | Stadium: Zalgiris Stadium; Attendance: 6,000; Referee: Brendan Shorte (Ireland) |

| 11 October 1995 UEFA Euro 1996 qualifying | Slovenia | 3–2 | Ukraine | Ljubljana, Slovenia |
| | Udovič (yellow card) 33'; Milanič (yellow card) 48'; Udovic 50', 90'; Zahovic 73'; Galič (yellow card) 74' | Report | Zhabchenko (red card) 16'; Skrypnyk (yellow card) 21'; Skrypnyk 23'; Huseinov 44'; Holovko (yellow card) 45'; Nahornyak (yellow card) 80' | Stadium: Stadion za Bežigradom; Attendance: 2,750; Referee: Alain Hammer (Luxembourg) |

| 11 November 1995 UEFA Euro 1996 qualifying | Italy | 3–1 | Ukraine | Bari, Italy |
| | Ravanelli 21', 49'; Baggio (yellow card) 32'; Maldini 53'; Crippa (yellow card) 70' | Report | Bezhenar (yellow card) 11'; Polunin 19'; Luzhnyi (yellow card) 57' | Stadium: Stadio San Nicola; Attendance: 43,999; Referee: Serge Muhmenthaler (Switzerland) |

=== 1996 ===
| 9 April 1996 Friendly | Moldova | 2–2 | Ukraine | Chişinău, Moldova |
| 17:00 (UTC+03:00) | Testemitanu 72'; Popovici 83' | Report | Huseinov 49', 66' | Stadium: Stadionul Republican; Attendance: 7,000; Referee: Vadim Zhuk (Belarus) |

| 1 May 1996 Friendly | Turkey | 3–2 | Ukraine | Samsun, Turkey |
| 20:00 (UTC+03:00) | Şükür 7'; Yiğit 13'; Kerimoğlu 32' | Report | Shevchenko 10'; Huseinov 34' | Stadium: 19 Mayıs Stadium; Attendance: 18,000; Referee: Otar Guntadze (Georgia) |

| 13 August 1996 Friendly | Ukraine | 5–2 | Lithuania | Kyiv, Ukraine |
| 19:00 (UTC+03:00) | Leonenko 45', 66'; Skrypnyk 62'; Maxymov 80', 83' | Report | Gvildys 19'; Poderis 53' | Stadium: Olympic NSC; Attendance: 3,500; Referee: Ladislav Gádoši (Slovakia) |

| 31 August 1996 1998 World Cup qualification | Northern Ireland | 0–1 | Ukraine | Belfast, Northern Ireland |
| | | Report | Serhii Rebrov 79' | Stadium: Windsor Park; Attendance: 9,358; Referee: Alain Sars (France) |

| 5 October 1996 1998 World Cup qualification | Ukraine | 2–1 | Portugal | Kyiv, Ukraine |
| | Serhiy Popov 4'; Yuri Maxymov 88' | Report | João Pinto 83' | Stadium: Olympic NSC; Attendance: 51,385; Referee: Kim Milton Nielsen (Denmark) |

| 9 November 1996 1998 World Cup qualification | Portugal | 1–0 | Ukraine | Porto, Portugal |
| | Couto 58' | Report | | Stadium: Estádio das Antas; Attendance: 19,106; Referee: Leif Sundell (Sweden) |

=== 1997 ===
| 23 March 1997 Friendly | Ukraine | 1–0 | Moldova | Kyiv, Ukraine |
| 16:00 UTC+2 | Serhii Rebrov 56' | Report | | Stadium: Olimpiyskiy; Attendance: 2,500; Referee: Robert Sedlacek (Austria) |

| 29 March 1997 1998 World Cup qualification | Albania | 0–1 | Ukraine | Granada, Spain |
| 18:00 UTC+1 | | Report | Serhii Rebrov 40' | Stadium: Estadio Nuevo Los Cármenes; Attendance: 250; Referee: John McDermott (Republic of Ireland) |

| 2 April 1997 1998 World Cup qualification | Ukraine | 2–1 | Northern Ireland | Kyiv, Ukraine |
| 18:00 UTC+3 | Vitaliy Kosovskyi 3'; Andriy Shevchenko 71' | Report | Iain Dowie 14' (pen.) | Stadium: Olimpiyskiy; Attendance: 85,000; Referee: Václav Krondl (Czech Republic) |

| 30 April 1997 1998 World Cup qualification | Germany | 2–0 | Ukraine | Bremen, Germany |
| 19:30 UTC+2 | Oliver Bierhoff 62'; Mario Basler 72' | Report | | Stadium: Weserstadion; Attendance: 33,242; Referee: Anders Frisk (Sweden) |

| 7 May 1997 1998 World Cup qualification | Ukraine | 1–1 | Armenia | Kyiv, Ukraine |
| 19:00 UTC+3 | Andriy Shevchenko 6' | Report | Artur Petrosyan 75' | Stadium: Olimpiyskiy; Attendance: 47,000; Referee: Atanas Uzunov (Bulgaria) |

| 7 June 1997 1998 World Cup qualification | Ukraine | 0–0 | Germany | Kyiv, Ukraine |
| 18:00 UTC+3 | | Report | | Stadium: Olimpyskiy; Attendance: 63,000; Referee: László Vágner (Hungary) |

| 20 August 1997 1998 World Cup qualification | Ukraine | 1–0 | Albania | Kyiv, Ukraine |
| 19:00 UTC+3 | Serhii Rebrov 87' | Report | | Stadium: Olimpiyskiy; Attendance: 38,000; Referee: Ľuboš Micheľ (Slovakia) |

| 11 October 1997 1998 World Cup qualification | Armenia | 0–2 | Ukraine | Yerevan, Armenia |
| | | Report | Andriy Shevchenko 34'; Yuriy Maksymov 56' | Stadium: Hrazdan Stadium; Attendance: 7,500; Referee: Manuel Díaz Vega (Spain) |

| 29 October 1997 1998 World Cup qualification play-offs | Croatia | 2–0 | Ukraine | Zagreb, Croatia |
| 18:00 UTC+1 | Slaven Bilić 11'; Goran Vlaović 49' | Report | | Stadium: Maksimir Stadium; Attendance: 10,405; Referee: Alain Sars (France) |

| 15 November 1997 1998 World Cup qualification play-offs | Ukraine | 1–1 | Croatia | Kyiv, Ukraine |
| 19:00 UTC+2 | Andriy Shevchenko 4' | Report | Alen Bokšić 27' | Stadium: Olimpiysky; Attendance: 77,500; Referee: Rune Pedersen (Norway) |

=== 1998 ===
| 15 July 1998 Friendly | Ukraine | 1–2 | Poland |

| 19 August 1998 Friendly | Ukraine | 4–0 | Georgia |

| 5 September 1998 UEFA Euro 2000 qualifying | Ukraine | 3–2 | Russia |

| 10 October 1998 UEFA Euro 2000 qualifying | Andorra | 0–2 | Ukraine |

| 14 October 1998 UEFA Euro 2000 qualifying | Ukraine | 2–0 | Armenia |

=== 1999 ===
| 20 March 1999 Friendly | Georgia | 0–1 | Ukraine |

| 27 March 1999 UEFA Euro 2000 qualifying | France | 0–0 | Ukraine |

| 31 March 1999 UEFA Euro 2000 qualifying | Ukraine | 1–1 | Iceland |

| 5 June 1999 UEFA Euro 2000 qualifying | Ukraine | 4–0 | Andorra |

| 9 June 1999 UEFA Euro 2000 qualifying | Armenia | 0–0 | Ukraine |

| 18 August 1999 Friendly | Ukraine | 1–1 | Bulgaria |

| 4 September 1999 UEFA Euro 2000 qualifying | Ukraine | 0–0 | France |

| 8 September 1999 UEFA Euro 2000 qualifying | Iceland | 0–1 | Ukraine |

| 9 October 1999 UEFA Euro 2000 qualifying | Russia | 1–1 | Ukraine |

| 13 November 1999 UEFA Euro 2000 qualifying play-offs | Slovenia | 2–1 | Ukraine | Ljubljana, Slovenia |
| | Zahovič 53'; Ačimovič 84' | Report | Shevchenko 33' | Stadium: Bežigrad Stadium; Attendance: 9,000; Referee: Urs Meier (Switzerland) |

| 17 November 1999 UEFA Euro 2000 qualifying play-offs | Ukraine | 1–1 | Slovenia | Kyiv, Ukraine |
| | Rebrov 68' (pen.) | Report | Pavlin 74' | Stadium: Olimpiyskiy National Sports Complex; Attendance: 45,000; Referee: Bernd Heynemann (Germany) |

=== 2000 ===
| 26 April 2000 Friendly | Bulgaria | 0–1 | Ukraine |

| 31 May 2000 Friendly | England | 2–0 | Ukraine |

| 2 September 2000 2002 World Cup qualification | Ukraine | 1–3 | Poland |

| 7 October 2000 2002 World Cup qualification | Armenia | 2–3 | Ukraine |

| 11 October 2000 2002 World Cup qualification | Norway | 0–1 | Ukraine |

=== 2001 ===
| 14 February 2001 Friendly | Georgia | 0–0 | Ukraine |

| 26 February 2001 Cyprus International Football Tournament | Romania | 1–0 | Ukraine |

| 28 February 2001 Cyprus International Football Tournament | Cyprus | 4–3 | Ukraine |

| 24 March 2001 2002 World Cup qualification | Ukraine | 0–0 | Belarus |

| 28 March 2001 2002 World Cup qualification | Wales | 1–1 | Ukraine |

| 2 June 2001 2002 World Cup qualification | Ukraine | 0–0 | Norway |

| 6 June 2001 2002 World Cup qualification | Ukraine | 1–1 | Wales |

| 15 August 2001 Friendly | Latvia | 0–1 | Ukraine |

| 1 September 2001 2002 World Cup qualification | Belarus | 0–2 | Ukraine |

| 5 September 2001 2002 World Cup qualification | Ukraine | 3–0 | Armenia |

| 6 October 2001 2002 World Cup qualification | Poland | 1–1 | Ukraine |

| 10 November 2001 2002 World Cup qualification play-offs | Ukraine | 1–1 | Germany |

| 14 November 2001 2002 World Cup qualification play-offs | Germany | 4–1 | Ukraine |

=== 2002 ===
| 21 March 2002 Friendly | Japan | 1–0 | Ukraine |

| 27 March 2002 Friendly | Romania | 4–1 | Ukraine |

| 17 April 2002 Friendly | Ukraine | 2–1 | Georgia |

| 17 May 2002 2002 LG Cup | Ukraine | 2–0 | FR Yugoslavia |

| 19 May 2002 2002 LG Cup | Belarus | 2–0 | Ukraine |

| 21 August 2002 Friendly | Ukraine | 0–1 | Iran |

| 7 September 2002 UEFA Euro 2004 qualifying | Armenia | 2–2 | Ukraine | Yerevan, Armenia |
| | Petrosyan 73'; Sarkisyan 90' (pen.) | Report | Serebrennikov 2'; Zubov 33' | Stadium: Hanrapetakan Stadium; Attendance: 12,500; Referee: (Finland) Mikko Vuorela |

| 12 October 2002 UEFA Euro 2004 qualifying | Ukraine | 2–0 | Greece | Kyiv, Ukraine |
| | Vorobey 51'; Voronin 90' | Report | | Stadium: NSC Olimpiyskyi; Attendance: 40,000; Referee: (Netherlands) René Temmink |

| 16 October 2002 UEFA Euro 2004 qualifying | Northern Ireland | 0–0 | Ukraine | Belfast, Northern Ireland |
| | | Report | | Stadium: Windsor Park; Attendance: 9,288; Referee: (Italy) Cosimo Bolognino |

| 20 November 2002 Friendly | Slovakia | 1–1 | Ukraine |

=== 2003 ===
| 12 February 2003 Friendly | Turkey | 0–0 | Ukraine |

| 29 March 2003 UEFA Euro 2004 qualifying | Ukraine | 2–2 | Spain |

| 12 April 2003 Friendly | Ukraine | 1–0 | Latvia |

| 30 April 2003 Friendly | Denmark | 1–0 | Ukraine |

| 7 June 2003 UEFA Euro 2004 qualifying | Ukraine | 4–3 | Armenia | Lviv, Ukraine |
| | Horshkov 28'; Shevchenko 65' (pen.), 73'; Fedorov 90' | Report | Sarkisyan 15' (pen.), 52'; Petrosyan 74' | Stadium: Ukraina Stadium; Attendance: 23,600; Referee: (Germany) Hermann Albrecht |

| 11 June 2003 UEFA Euro 2004 qualifying | Greece | 1–0 | Ukraine |

| 20 August 2003 Friendly | Ukraine | 0–2 | Romania |

| 6 September 2003 UEFA Euro 2004 qualifying | Ukraine | 0–0 | Northern Ireland | Donetsk, Ukraine |
| | | Report | | Stadium: Shakhtar Stadium; Attendance: 25,700; Referee: (Germany) Wolfgang Stark |

| 10 September 2003 UEFA Euro 2004 qualifying | Spain | 2–1 | Ukraine | Elche, Spain |
| | Raúl 59', 71' | Report | Shevchenko 84' | Stadium: Estadio Martínez Valero; Attendance: 33,847; Referee: (Norway) Terje Hauge |

| 11 October 2003 Friendly | Ukraine | 0–0 | Macedonia | Kyiv, Ukraine |
| | | Report | | Stadium: Valeriy Lobanovskyi Dynamo Stadium; Attendance: 10,000; Referee: (Moldova) Ghenadie Orlic |

=== 2004 ===
| 18 February 2004 Friendly | Libya | 1–1 | Ukraine | Tripoli, Libya |
| | Kara 56' | Report | Pukanych 15' | Stadium: June 11 Stadium; Attendance: 40,000; Referee: (Morocco) Abderrahim El Arjoun |

| 31 March 2004 Friendly | Macedonia | 1–0 | Ukraine | Skopje, Macedonia |
| | Stavrevski 26' | Report | | Stadium: Gradski; Attendance: 16,000; Referee: (Serbia and Montenegro) Milan Karadžić |

| 28 April 2004 Friendly | Ukraine | 1–1 | Slovakia | Kyiv, Ukraine |
| | Venhlinskyi 13' | Report | Varga 65' | Stadium: Valeriy Lobanovskyi Dynamo Stadium; Attendance: 16,800; Referee: (Poland) Mirosław Ryszka |

| 6 June 2004 Friendly | France | 1–0 | Ukraine | Saint-Denis, France |
| | Zidane 87' | Report | | Stadium: Stade de France; Attendance: 66,646; Referee: (Slovenia) Darko Čeferin |

| 18 August 2004 Friendly | England | 3–0 | Ukraine | Newcastle upon Tyne, England |
| | Beckham 28'; Owen 50'; Wright-Phillips 72' | Report | | Stadium: St James' Park; Attendance: 35,387; Referee: (Scotland) Mike McCurry |

| 4 September 2004 2006 World Cup qualification | Denmark | 1–1 | Ukraine | Copenhagen, Denmark |
| | Jørgensen 9' | Report | Husin 56' | Stadium: Parken Stadium; Attendance: 36,335; Referee: (Switzerland) Urs Meier |

| 8 September 2004 2006 World Cup qualification | Kazakhstan | 1–2 | Ukraine | Almaty, Kazakhstan |
| | Karpovich 34' | Report | Byelik 14'; Rotan 90' | Stadium: Almaty Central Stadium; Attendance: 23,000; Referee: (Portugal) Pedro Proença |

| 9 October 2004 2006 World Cup qualification | Ukraine | 1–1 | Greece | Kyiv, Ukraine |
| | Shevchenko 48' | Report | Tsiartas 82' | Stadium: NSC Olimpiyskyi; Attendance: 56,000; Referee: (Spain) Manuel Mejuto González |

| 13 October 2004 2006 World Cup qualification | Ukraine | 2–0 | Georgia | Lviv, Ukraine |
| | Byelik 12'; Shevchenko 79' | Report | | Stadium: Ukraina Stadium; Attendance: 28,000; Referee: (Germany) Wolfgang Stark |

| 17 November 2004 2006 World Cup qualification | Turkey | 0–3 | Ukraine | Istanbul, Turkey |
| | | Report | Husiev 8'; Shevchenko 17', 88' | Stadium: Şükrü Saracoğlu Stadium; Attendance: 40,486; Referee: (Portugal) Lucílio Batista |

=== 2005 ===
| 9 February 2005 2006 World Cup qualification | Albania | 0–2 | Ukraine | Tirana, Albania |
| | | Report | Rusol 40'; Husin 59' | Stadium: Qemal Stafa Stadium; Attendance: 12,000; Referee: (England) Steve Bennett |

| 30 March 2005 2006 World Cup qualification | Ukraine | 1–0 | Denmark | Kyiv, Ukraine |
| | Voronin 67' | Report | | Stadium: NSC Olimpiyskyi; Attendance: 55,000; Referee: (Slovakia) Ľuboš Micheľ |

| 4 June 2005 2006 World Cup qualification | Ukraine | 2–0 | Kazakhstan | Kyiv, Ukraine |
| | Shevchenko 18'; Avdeyev 83' (o.g.) | Report | | Stadium: NSC Olimpiyskyi; Attendance: 45,000; Referee: (Austria) Gerald Lehner |

| 8 June 2005 2006 World Cup qualification | Greece | 0–1 | Ukraine | Piraeus, Greece |
| | | Report | Husin 82' | Stadium: Karaiskakis Stadium; Attendance: 33,500; Referee: (Netherlands) René Temmink |

| 15 August 2005 Valeriy Lobanovskyi Memorial Tournament | Ukraine | 0–0 (3–5 p) | Israel | Kyiv, Ukraine |
| | | Report | | Stadium: Valeriy Lobanovskyi Dynamo Stadium; Attendance: 7,000; Referee: (Poland) Tomasz Mikulski |
| | Penalties |
| | Husin (penalty missed); Tymoshchuk (penalty scored); Rotan (penalty scored); Husiev (penalty scored) | | Gershon (penalty scored); Tuama (penalty scored); Suan (penalty scored); Harazi (penalty scored); Keisi (penalty scored) |

| 17 August 2005 Valeriy Lobanovskyi Memorial Tournament | Ukraine | 2–1 | Serbia and Montenegro |

| 3 September 2005 2006 World Cup qualification | Georgia | 1–1 | Ukraine |

| 7 September 2005 2006 World Cup qualification | Ukraine | 0–1 | Turkey | Kyiv, Ukraine |
| | | Report | Tümer 55' | Stadium: NSC Olimpiyskyi; Attendance: 67,000; Referee: (France) Alain Sars |

| 8 October 2005 2006 World Cup qualification | Ukraine | 2–2 | Albania |

| 12 October 2005 Friendly | Ukraine | 1–0 | Japan |

=== 2006 ===
| 28 February 2006 Friendly | Azerbaijan | 0–0 | Ukraine |

| 28 May 2006 Friendly | Ukraine | 4–0 | Costa Rica |

| 2 June 2006 Friendly | Italy | 0–0 | Ukraine |

| 5 June 2006 Friendly | Libya | 0–3 | Ukraine |

| 8 June 2006 Friendly | Luxembourg | 0–3 | Ukraine |

| 14 June 2006 2006 World Cup Group Stage | Spain | 4–0 | Ukraine |

| 19 June 2006 2006 World Cup Group Stage | Saudi Arabia | 0–4 | Ukraine | Hamburg, Germany |
| | | Report | Rusol 4'; Rebrov 36'; Shevchenko 46'; Kalynychenko 84' | Stadium: FIFA WM Stadion Hamburg; Attendance: 50,000; Referee: (England) Graham Poll |

| 23 June 2006 2006 World Cup Group Stage | Tunisia | 1–0 | Ukraine |

| 26 June 2006 2006 World Cup round of 16 | Switzerland | 0–0 (a.e.t.) | Ukraine |

| 30 June 2006 2006 World Cup quarter-finals | Italy | 3–0 | Ukraine |

| 15 August 2006 Friendly | Ukraine | 6–0 | Azerbaijan |

| 6 September 2006 UEFA Euro 2008 qualifying | Ukraine | 3–2 | Georgia |

| 7 October 2006 UEFA Euro 2008 qualifying | Italy | 2–0 | Ukraine |

| 11 October 2006 UEFA Euro 2008 qualifying | Ukraine | 2–0 | Scotland |

=== 2007 ===
| 7 February 2007 Friendly | Israel | 1–1 | Ukraine |

| 24 March 2007 UEFA Euro 2008 qualifying | Faroe Islands | 0–2 | Ukraine |

| 28 March 2007 UEFA Euro 2008 qualifying | Ukraine | 1–0 | Lithuania |

| 2 June 2007 UEFA Euro 2008 qualifying | France | 2–0 | Ukraine | Saint-Denis, France |
| | Ribéry 57'; Anelka 71' | Report | | Stadium: Stade de France; Attendance: 80,051; Referee: (Spain) Luis Medina Cantalejo |

| 22 August 2007 Friendly | Ukraine | 2–1 | Uzbekistan |

| 8 September 2007 UEFA Euro 2008 qualifying | Georgia | 1–1 | Ukraine |

| 12 September 2007 UEFA Euro 2008 qualifying | Ukraine | 1–2 | Italy |

| 13 October 2007 UEFA Euro 2008 qualifying | Scotland | 3–1 | Ukraine |

| 17 October 2007 UEFA Euro 2008 qualifying | Ukraine | 5–0 | Faroe Islands |

| 17 November 2007 UEFA Euro 2008 qualifying | Lithuania | 2–0 | Ukraine |

| 21 November 2007 UEFA Euro 2008 qualifying | Ukraine | 2–2 | France |

=== 2008 ===
| 6 February 2008 Friendly | Cyprus | 1–1 | Ukraine |

| 26 March 2008 Friendly | Ukraine | 2–0 | Serbia |

| 24 May 2008 Friendly | Netherlands | 3–0 | Ukraine |

| 1 June 2008 Friendly | Sweden | 0–1 | Ukraine |

| 20 August 2008 Friendly | Ukraine | 1–0 | Poland |

| 6 September 2008 2010 World Cup qualification | Ukraine | 1–0 | Belarus |

| 10 September 2008 2010 World Cup qualification | Kazakhstan | 1–3 | Ukraine |

| 11 October 2008 2010 World Cup qualification | Ukraine | 0–0 | Croatia |

| 19 November 2008 Friendly | Ukraine | 1–0 | Norway |

=== 2009 ===
| 10 February 2009 Cyprus International Football Tournament | Slovakia | 2–3 | Ukraine |

| 11 February 2009 Cyprus International Football Tournament | Serbia | 0–1 | Ukraine |

| 1 April 2009 2010 World Cup qualification | England | 2–1 | Ukraine |

| 6 June 2009 2010 World Cup qualification | Croatia | 2–2 | Ukraine |

| 10 June 2009 2010 World Cup qualification | Ukraine | 2–1 | Kazakhstan |

| 12 August 2009 Friendly | Ukraine | 0–3 | Turkey |

| 5 September 2009 2010 World Cup qualification | Ukraine | 5–0 | Andorra |

| 9 September 2009 2010 World Cup qualification | Belarus | 0–0 | Ukraine |

| 10 October 2009 2010 World Cup qualification | Ukraine | 1–0 | England |

| 14 October 2009 2010 World Cup qualification | Andorra | 0–6 | Ukraine |

| 14 November 2009 2010 FIFA World Cup qualifying play-offs | Greece | 0–0 | Ukraine |

| 18 November 2009 2010 FIFA World Cup qualifying play-offs | Ukraine | 0–1 | Greece |

== See also ==
- Ukraine national football team rosters
