= 1992 Ukraine v Hungary football match =

Ukraine v Hungary (1992)
- Event: Exhibition game
Ukraine	Hungary
(Ukraine)	(Hungary)
1	3
- Date: 29 April 1992
- Venue: Avanhard Stadium, Uzhhorod, Zakarpattia Oblast
- Referee: Vadim Zhuk (Belarus)
- Attendance: 13,000
- Weather: +22°C

Ukraine v Hungary (29 April 1992) was an exhibition or friendly association football match, which became the first international game for the Ukraine national football team to be recognised by FIFA. The game took place in the city of Uzhhorod close to the border with Hungary in the spring of 1992 and saw Hungary win 3–1.

== Background ==
This game was organized almost by accident. The president of FFU was on vacation with his wife in Budapest. Walking the streets of the city, they ended up by the doors to the Hungarian Football Federation and decided to enter. With the help of his wife, who knew English, they agreed to play a game between the two national teams.

At first, they came up with the date of 28 April, but because of Viktor Bannikov's birthday, it was agreed to postpone it to 29 April. The place was changed from the original at Olympic NSC in Kyiv to the Avanhard in Uzhhorod, because of financial difficulties. Those difficulties also contributed to the hardship of gathering the national team of the FFU because the Federation could not afford to pay plane tickets of some of the footballers. On the other hand, Hungary also did not seem to be such a difficult opponent, finishing in the fourth place of Group 3 during the UEFA Euro 1992 qualifying event. However, the Hungarians managed to pull a surprising draw during the game in Moscow with József Kiprich being the major hero of the Mighty Magyars at that time. Hungarians did manage to bring their optimal team roster to the game in Uzhhorod, the central stadium of which was filled as never before. Emerich Jenei in his career as a coach effectively led his teams in the games against the Soviet Union national football team and had some world-class experience qualifying for the 1990 World Cup in Italy.

The FFU wanted to see Valery Lobanovskiy as the head coach, but he was under contract with United Arab Emirates national football team, and the Ukrainian federation could not afford to pay for the cancellation of his contract. So, from the three candidates who agreed to pledge their services, the first coach of the Ukraine national football team was chosen Viktor Prokopenko, coaching FC Chornomorets Odesa. Chornomorets at that time finished fourth in the Soviet Top League 1991 season and was the top representative of Ukrainian football. Other two candidates were Anatoliy Puzach (FC Dynamo Kyiv) and Valeriy Yaremchenko (FC Shakhtar Donetsk). Prokopenko's assistants were chosen Mykola Pavlov (Dnipro Dnipropetrovsk) and Leonid Tkachenko (Metalist Kharkiv).

== Perspective ==
The Ukraine national team at that time seemed simply as an alternative, a type of B-team to the post-Soviet football project of CIS national football team. In 1992, it was even planned to conduct the CIS club championship, which ultimately did not take place. Concurrently with the game in Uzhhorod between Ukraine and Hungary, the CIS team played its own friendly against the England national football team. The main Ukrainian international candidates chose to travel to Moscow, among them were Akhrik Tsveiba, Oleksiy Mykhaylychenko, Volodymyr Lyutyi, Andrei Kanchelskis, Sergei Yuran, and Viktor Onopko. Mykhailichenko was given the captain's handband, which he kept until the disbandment of the CIS team. For the post-Soviet team, that was the first friendly after their intensive winter tour from January 25 to February 19, during which the team had played five games.

Even with the above-mentioned players being involved in the preparation for the Euro-1992, Prokopenko still had some resources to choose from, such as Oleh Protasov, Oleh Kuznetsov, and others. However, because the financing of the Ukrainian Federation ceased from Moscow, being left with only what was available within the country. Ukraine also did not have its own embassies, which only added extra hardship to rally players, numerous of whom played abroad in Germany, Israel, and elsewhere. Prokopenko managed to obtain the "allegiance" from two of the former Soviet internationals and one CIS "dropout": Oleh Luzhnyi, Ivan Hetsko, and Yuriy Nikiforov. Another promising player was Serhiy Scherbakov, who, together with Onopko, Nikiforov, and Serhiy Bezhenar, played for the Soviet Olympic team (U-21). Prokopenko also managed to invite some Russian-born players, such as Yudin and Salenko, who at that time played in Ukraine. Important also important that both Hetsko and Shelepnytsky had been recently recruited by Byshovets for the Italian tour in the winter of 1991 when the Soviet team played a series of friendlies with selected clubs.

The Prokopenko's team, however, fell apart by the end of 1992, and only a few players continued their international career under the blue-yellow flag. An interesting fact is that a good portion of this team later joined Romantsev's FC Spartak Moscow, which was among the top European clubs in the early 90s.

Due to a lack of funding, the team was dressed in the football kit of Inter Milan from Umbro, while Ihor Kutepov played in the football kit of Dynamo Kyiv. Among the sponsors of the game, there was a company "Dinamo - Atlantik" owned by Hryhoriy Surkis.

== Squads ==
The list of 20 players for the first game of the Ukraine national team was such,

- Goalkeepers: Ihor Kutyepov (Dynamo Kyiv), Viktor Hryshko (Chornomorets Odesa)
- Defenders: Oleh Luzhnyi (8/0) (Dynamo Kyiv), Yuriy Moroz (Dynamo Kyiv), Yuriy Nikiforov (4/0) (Chornomorets Odesa), Serhiy Tretyak (Chornomorets Odesa), Yevhen Drahunov (Shakhtar Donetsk), Serhiy Bezhenar (Dnipro Dnipropetrovsk)
- Midfielders: Andriy Annenkov (Dynamo Kyiv), Serhiy Kovalets (Dynamo Kyiv), Serhiy Zayets (Dynamo Kyiv), Yuriy Shelepnytskyi (Chornomorets Odesa), Yuriy Sak (Chornomorets Odesa), Ilya Tsymbalar (Chornomorets Odesa), Serhiy Pohodin (Shakhtar Donetsk), Yuriy Dudnyk (Metalurh Zaporizhya)
- Forwards: Oleg Salenko (Dynamo Kyiv), Ivan Hetsko (5/0) (Chornomorets Odesa), Serhiy Husyev (Chornomorets Odesa), Serhiy Scherbakov (Shakhtar Donetsk).
- Coaching Staff
  - Manager: Viktor Prokopenko (Chornomorets Odesa)
  - Assistants: Mykola Pavlov (Dnipro Dnipropetrovsk), Leonid Tkachenko (Metalist Kharkiv)

Hungarian national:

- Goalkeepers: István Brockhauser (5/0) (Újpest FC), Tamás Balogh
- Defenders: Tibor Simon (6/0) (Ferencvárosi TC), Tamás Mónos, András Telek, Emil Lőrincz, Zsolt Limperger (16/1) (Real Burgos CF), Tibor Balog
- Midfielders: Gábor Márton (1/0) (K.R.C. Genk), Péter Lipcsei (7/0) (Ferencvárosi TC), István Pisont (4/0) (Kispest Honvéd FC), Béla Illés (4/0) (Szombathelyi Haladás)
- Forwards: József Kiprich (50/19) (Feyenoord), István Sallói (Videoton FC), István Vincze (23/5) (Kispest Honvéd FC), Kálmán Kovács (42/12) (Kispest Honvéd FC).
- Manager: Emerich Jenei

== Details ==
The game itself, according to the Komanda newspaper was less rich on events as the whole period of its organization. The weather at the Avanhard stadium was more than favorable for the football festival with a sun shining all day with +22°C. At first Shelepnytskyi wasted an opportunity to open the score by striking the goal-post, then the referee, Vadim Zhuk (Belarus), was indecisive to point to a penalty mark for the foul against Scherbakov.

And after the break all the fire for a victory was lost to the guest team and with it the whole game. In the second half several quick Hungarian counterattacks were accented by finishing performances from Salloi and Kiprich. About five minutes to the end of the match Kiprich realized a penalty, settling the ball in the left low corner and setting Kutepov off-balance in the opposite direction. At the end on the 90th minute, after trailing 0:3, the Ukrainians managed on a consolidation goal from Hetsko scoring the free kick. Hetsko made a history becoming the author of the first goal of the national team and the only one in his career on such level.

Note that attendance might not be precise, because of various reasons. One source claims eleven thousand, another thirteen thousand. However, considering that Avanhard itself has capacity to hold 12,000 it would be safe to assume that the stadium was filled at least to its near limit.

29 April 1992
19:00 LST

Ukraine	1–3	Hungary
Hetsko 90'	Report (ua); Report (hu); Report	Sallói 61'; Kiprich 70', 84' (pen.)

Avanhard Stadium, Uzhhorod
Attendance: 13,000
Referee: Vadim Zhuk (Belarus)

Ukraine	Hungary

UKRAINE:
GK	Ihor Kutyepov
DF	Oleh Luzhnyi
DF	Yuriy Nikiforov
DF	Serhiy Bezhenar
MF	Serhiy Tretyak
MF	Serhiy Kovalets	(yellow card) 71'
MF	Ilya Tsymbalar
MF	Yuriy Shelepnytskyi (c)
MF	Oleg Salenko		(substituted off) 59'
MF	Serhiy Pohodin		(substituted off) 56'
FW	Serhiy Scherbakov		(substituted off) 69'
Substitutes:
GK	Viktor Hryshko
FW	Ivan Hetsko		(substituted on) 59'
MF	Yuriy Sak		(substituted on) 56'
FW	Serhiy Husyev		(substituted on) 69'
DF	Yevhen Drahunov
MF	Andriy Annenkov
DF	Serhiy Zayets
DF	Yuriy Moroz
MF	Yuriy Dudnyk
Manager:
(Ukraine) Viktor Prokopenko

HUNGARY:
GK	István Brockhauser		(substituted off) 88'
DF	Tamás Mónos	(yellow card) 16'
DF	András Telek
DF	Tibor Simon
DF	Emil Lőrincz		(substituted off) 86'
DF	Zsolt Limperger		(substituted off) 58'
FW	József Kiprich
MF	Gábor Márton		(substituted off) 82'
FW	István Sallói	(yellow card) 17'	(substituted off) 74'
MF	Péter Lipcsei
FW	István Vincze
Substitutes:
GK	Tamás Balogh		(substituted on) 88'
MF	István Pisont		(substituted on) 74'
DF	Tibor Balog		(substituted on) 58'
FW	Kálmán Kovács		(substituted on) 86'
MF	Béla Illés		(substituted on) 82'
Manager:
(Romania) Emerich Jenei

MATCH OFFICIALS

- Assistant referees:
  - Valeriy Avdysh (Ukraine)
  - Volodymyr Pianykh (Ukraine)
- Fourth official: ? (?)

MATCH RULES

- 90 minutes.
- Seven named substitutes

== Legacy ==
- On 31 May 2017 there took place a friendly among footballer veterans of Ukraine and Hungary to commemorate the game of 1992.

== See also ==
- Ukraine national football team 1992
