= Aleksandr Pomazun =

Russian footballer (born 1971)

Personal information
- Full name: Aleksandr Vasilyevich Pomazun
- Date of birth: 11 October 1971 (age 55)
- Place of birth: Kharkiv, Ukrainian SSR,USSR
- Height: 1.91 m (6 ft 3 in)
- Position: Goalkeeper

Team information
- Current team: FC Khimik-Arsenal (GK coach)

Youth career
- 1987–1989: Metalist Kharkiv

Senior career*
Years	Team	Apps	(Gls)
1990–1993	Metalist Kharkiv	54	(0)
1993–1994	Spartak Moscow	8	(0)
1994–1998	Baltika Kaliningrad	87	(0)
1999–2001	Torpedo-ZIL Moscow	64	(0)
2001–2002	Saturn-RenTV Ramenskoye	9	(0)
2003	Sokol Saratov	0	(0)
2004	Baltika Kaliningrad	5	(0)
2004	Ural Yekaterinburg	5	(0)
2005–2007	Spartak-MZhK Ryazan	48	(0)
2008	Volga Nizhny Novgorod	11	(0)
2008	Nizhny Novgorod	16	(0)

International career
1990	USSR U-18		
1991	USSR U-20	5	(0)
1992–1993	Ukraine	4	(0)
1993–1994	Russia U-21	4	(0)

Managerial career
- 2009–2011: Baltika Kaliningrad (GK coach)
- 2011–2013: Dynamo Saint Petersburg (assistant)
- 2014: Volga Tver (GK coach)
- 2015: Arsenal Tula (reserves GK coach)
- 2019–: FC Khimik-Arsenal (GK coach)
Medal record
Men's football
Representing Soviet Union
FIFA World Youth Championship
Bronze medal – third place	1991 Portugal
UEFA European Under-18 Championship
Winner	1990 Hungary
- * Club domestic league appearances and goals

Aleksandr Vasilyevich Pomazun (Russian: Александр Васильевич Помазун; Ukrainian: Олександр Васильович Помазун; born 11 October 1971) is a former goalkeeper and football coach. He is the goalkeepers coach with FC Khimik-Arsenal.

== International ==
National Team	Year	Friendlies		World Cup		European Championships		Confederations Cup		Total	
National Team	Year	Pld	GA	Pld	GA	Pld	GA	Pld	GA	Pld	GA
Ukraine	1992	3	3	0	0	0	0	0	0	3	3
Ukraine	1993	1	1	0	0	0	0	0	0	1	1
Total		4	4	0	0	0	0	0	0	4	4

He also capped for USSR U-20 team at 1991 FIFA World Youth Championship and 1990 UEFA European champion for USSR U-18. Later in 1993 he switched his allegiance to Russia and played for the Russia national under-21 football team in the 1994 UEFA European Under-21 Championship qualification.

== Honours ==
- UEFA European Under-18 Championship champion: 1990
- Russian Premier League champion: 1993.

== European club competitions ==
- 1993–94 UEFA Champions League with FC Spartak Moscow: 6 games.
- 1998 UEFA Intertoto Cup with FC Baltika Kaliningrad: 2 games.

== Personal life ==
His son Ilya Pomazun is a professional goalkeeper, who represents Russia.
