= Esperanto in Romania =

International auxiliary language in Romania

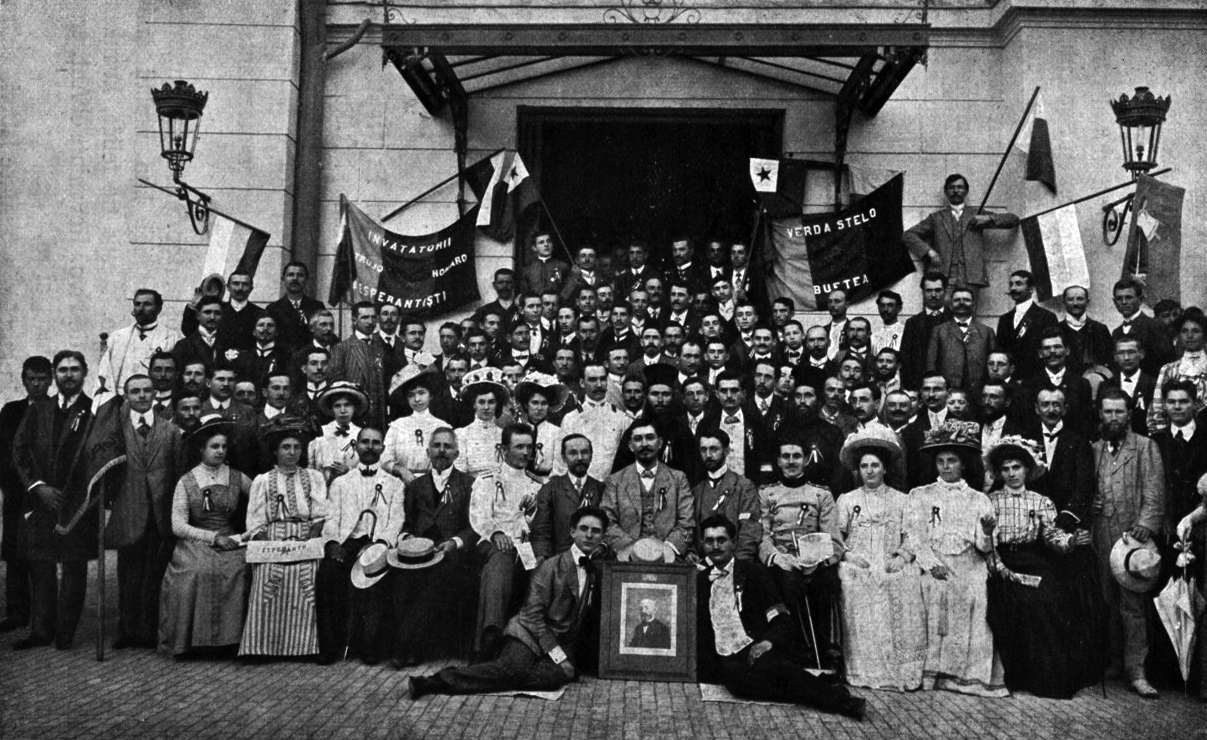
A meeting of Romanian Esperantists in 1909

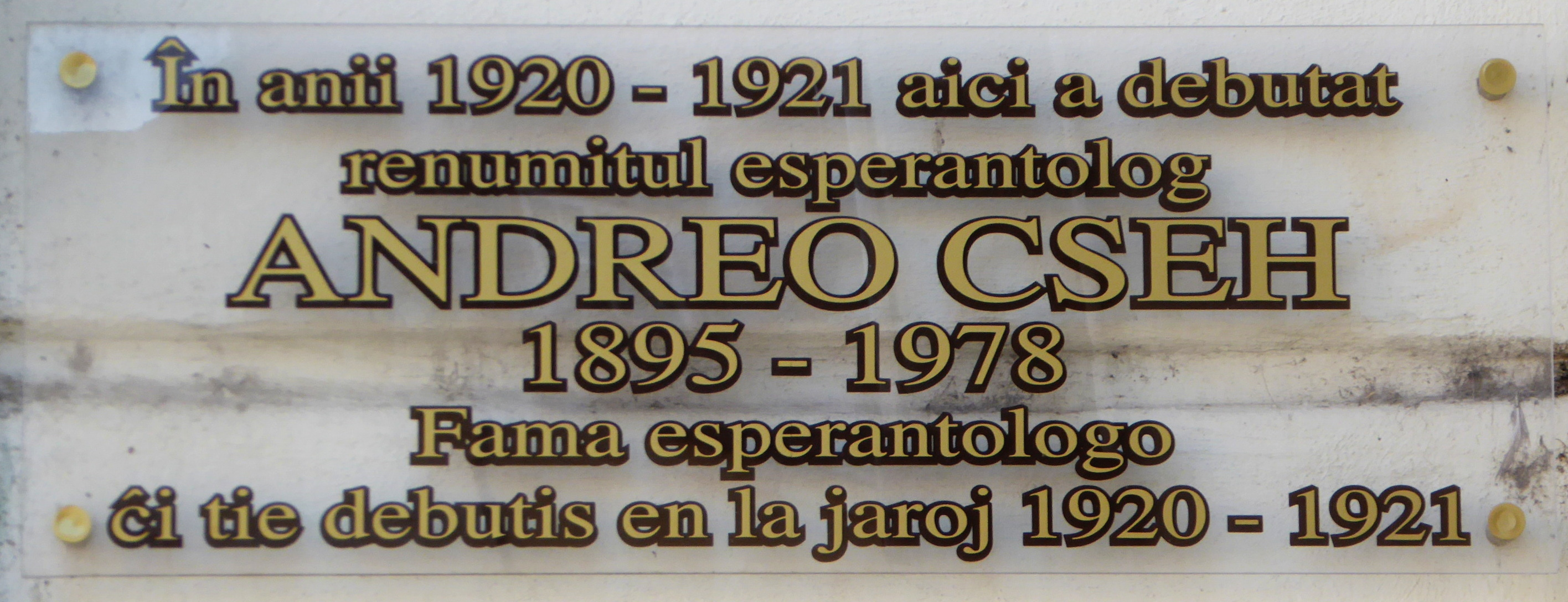
A plaque in both Romanian and Esperanto commemorating Andreo Cseh in Sibiu

Esperanto is a minor language in Romania.

== History ==
The first Esperanto–Romanian dictionary was written by Marta Frollo in 1889, and the Esperanto community in Romania was pioneered by Henriko Fischer-Galați in the 1900s. The Romanian Esperanto Society was founded in 1907. Ethnic Hungarian priest Andreo Cseh was a major figure of the Romanian Esperantist movement in the 1920s. An Esperantist group in Cluj was arrested in 1922 after the green star of Esperanto was mistaken for a communist star, but the head of the resulting military tribunal absolved the group and described Esperanto "a very beautiful cultural movement".

The Romanian Esperanto Society was recognized as a legal entity in 1947, but the Esperanto movement in Romania started suffering suppression by the communist government from 1948 onwards and it would not be reestablished until 1990 after the Romanian Revolution which ended the communist government. The Esperanto Association of Romania was founded in 1990 as a successor to the Romanian Esperanto Society, and the Romanian Esperanto Youth Organization was founded in 1996. As of 2021, there are 23 people from Romania that are members of the Universal Esperanto Association. Ionel Oneț is a major figure in the post-communist Romanian Esperantist movement.

== See also ==
- Languages of Romania
- History of Esperanto

== Bibliography ==
- Lins, Ulrich (2016). Dangerous Language — Esperanto Under Hitler and Stalin. Palgrave Macmillan. ISBN 9781349715053.
- Lins, Ulrich (2017). Dangerous Language — Esperanto and the Decline of Stalinism. Palgrave Macmillan. ISBN 9781352000207.
