= Ivan Hetsko =

Ukrainian footballer (born 1968)

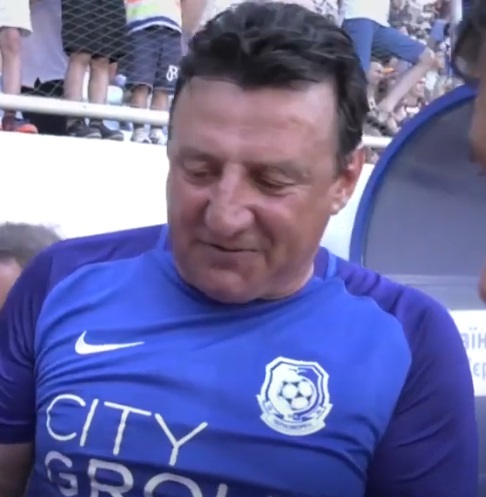

Personal information
- Full name: Ivan Mikhailovich Hetsko
- Date of birth: 6 April 1968 (age 58)
- Place of birth: Dnipropetrovsk, Ukrainian SSR Soviet Union
- Height: 1.86 m (6 ft 1 in)
- Position: Forward

Youth career
- 1981–1985: Irshava sports school

Senior career*
Years	Team	Apps	(Gls)
1986–1988	Zakarpattia Uzhhorod	53	(10)
1988	SKA Karpaty Lviv	5	(0)
1989–1992	Chornomorets Odesa	74	(24)
1992–1994	Maccabi Haifa	53	(23)
1995–1996	Lokomotiv Nizhniy Novgorod	48	(18)
1997	Alania Vladikavkaz	15	(4)
1997	Dnipro Dnipropetrovsk	14	(7)
1998–1999	Karpaty Lviv	51	(29)
2000	Kryvbas Kryviy Rih	20	(18)
2000	→ Kryvbas-2 Kryvyi Rih	2	(1)
2001	Metalist Kharkiv	14	(8)
2001	→ Metalist-2 Kharkiv	1	(1)

International career
1990	USSR	5	(0)
1992–1997	Ukraine	4	(1)

Managerial career
- 2003–2006: Signal Odesa (manager)
- 2007: Chornomorets Odesa (coach, instructor)
- 2026–: Real Pharma (manager)
- * Club domestic league appearances and goals

Ivan Hetsko (born 6 April 1968) is a Ukrainian former professional footballer who played as a forward. He made four appearances for the Ukraine national football team, scoring one goal. His goal was in Ukraine's first match and Ukraine's first goal after the dissolution of the Soviet Union, in a 3–1 friendly loss against Hungary. He also played five matches for the USSR. In 2002, he played for Ukrainian futsal club Signal Odesa.

== International goal ==
Scores and results list Ukraine's goal tally first.

No	Date	Venue	Opponent	Score	Result	Competition
1.	29 April 1992	Avanhard Stadium, Uzhhorod, Ukraine	Hungary	1–3	1–3	Friendly match

== Managerial career ==
=== Real Pharma Odesa ===
On 5 July 2026, it was announced that Hetsko would take over as head coach of Ukrainian club Real Pharma.
