= István Brockhauser =

Hungarian footballer (born 1964)

Personal information
- Full name: István Brockhauser
- Date of birth: 3 May 1964 (age 62)
- Place of birth: Budapest, Hungary
- Height: 1.93 m (6 ft 4 in)
- Position: Goalkeeper

Senior career*
Years	Team	Apps	(Gls)
1987–1988	Vác-Újbuda LTC	30	(0)
1988–1992	Újpest FC	115	(0)
1992–1996	Budapest Honvéd FC	79	(0)
1996	Győri ETO FC	11	(0)
1996–2002	RC Genk	120	(0)
2002–2004	Újpest FC	0	(0)

International career
1990–1992	Hungary	10	(0)
- * Club domestic league appearances and goals

István Brockhauser (born 3 May 1964) is a Hungarian former football player.

== Hungary national football team ==
From 1990 to 1992, he was the No. 2 goalkeeper of the Hungarian national team behind Zsolt Petry under the Hungarian coach Kálmán Mészöly and Imre Jenei. Later on, he was replaced as No. 2 goalkeeper by Zoltán Végh.

== KRC Genk ==
Brockhauser reached a major success while playing for Belgian club KRC Genk, where his colleagues in the successful team included Branko Strupar, Souleymane Oularé, Thordur Ghudjonsson, Mike Origi, Domenico Olivieri, and Wilfried Delbroek.

Brockhauser spent 6 years with KRC Genk and was known among supporters by the nickname "Brockie". He often encouraged the crowd before matches the crowd before matches began by waving his arms as he walked towards the goal.

In the 2001 season he broke his leg after a strong tackle from Korean SK Beveren striker Lee Sang Il, after which spectators in the stadium yelled and booed the striker and the other Genk players looked for the Korean to take revenge. Brockhauser recovered in two months, but lost his place to Jan Moons with whom Brockhauser had been challenging to be first choice keeper in Genk.

The 2002 season, when Genk became Belgian champions for the second time, was Brockhauser's last season at KRC Genk. He completed the season as second keeper behind Jan Moons, only gaining some minor time on the pitch with a heroic goodbye from Genk fans at the end of that season's final game, against SK Lokeren.

== Honours ==
- Hungarian League: 1990, 1993
- Hungarian Cup: 1992, 1996
- Belgian First Division: 1998–99, 2001–02
- Belgian Cup: 1997–98, 1999–2000

== See also ==
- Jupiler League
