= Tamás Balogh =

Hungarian footballer

Personal information
- Date of birth: 6 September 1967 (age 59)
- Place of birth: Budapest
- Position: Goalkeeper

Senior career*
| Years | Team | Apps | (Gls) |
| 1987–1993 | Ferencvárosi TC | | |
| 1993–1994 | MTK Budapest FC | | |
| 1994–1995 | Ferencvárosi TC | | |
| 1995–1996 | Pécsi MFC | | |
| 1996–1997 | Győri ETO FC | | |
| 1998–1999 | Dunaferr SE | | |
| 1999–2002 | FC Tatabánya | | |
| 2002–2004 | Szombathelyi Haladás | | |

International career
| 1992 | Hungary | 3 | (0) |

Managerial career
- 2012–: Ferencvárosi TC (goalkeeper coach)
- * Club domestic league appearances and goals

Tamás Balogh (born 6 September 1967) is a retired Hungarian football goalkeeper.
