= András Keresztúri =

Hungarian footballer

Personal information
- Date of birth: 2 November 1967 (age 58)
- Place of birth: Cegléd, Hungary
- Height: 1.82 m (6 ft 0 in)
- Position: Striker

Youth career
- Ferencváros Budapest

Senior career*
Years	Team	Apps	(Gls)
1988–1991	Ferencváros Budapest	42	(8)
1991–1993	MTK Budapest	47	(11)
1993–1994	Austria Wien	?	(?)
1994–1996	Fehérvár	34	(3)
1996–1997	Csepel	33	(3)
1997–2000	Slovan Bratislava	?	(?)
2000–2001	Cegléd	?	(?)
2001–2003	Békéscsabai Előre	25	(9)

International career
1991–1997	Hungary	20	(2)
- * Club domestic league appearances and goals as of 31 May 2003

András Keresztúri (born 2 November 1967) is a Hungarian footballer who last played for Békéscsabai Előre as striker.
