= Tibor Balog (footballer, born 1966) =

Hungarian footballer

Personal information
- Full name: Tibor Balog
- Date of birth: 1 March 1966 (age 60)
- Place of birth: Kakucs
- Position: Midfielder

Youth career
- 1980–1984: Kakucs

Senior career*
Years	Team	Apps	(Gls)
1984–1986	MTK		
1986–1988	Váci Izzo MTE		
1988–1993	MTK		
1993–1997	Charleroi		
1997–1999	Maccabi Ironi Ashdod		
1999–2000	Hapoel Be'er Sheva		
2000–2002	Mons		

International career
- Hungary u-21
1988–1997	Hungary	38	(2)

Managerial career
- 2009–2011: Charleroi (assistant)
- 2011–2012: Charleroi
- 2012: La Louvière Centre
- 2016–2018: La Louvière Centre
- 2019–2020: Wavre
- 2020–2021: RCS Braine
- 2021: Tubize-Braine
- 2024–: OH Leuven (assistant)
- * Club domestic league appearances and goals

Tibor Balog (born 1 March 1966) is a football manager and retired Hungarian midfielder. He is currently an assistant manager at OH Leuven.
