= Andreo Cseh =

Catholic priest and esperantist

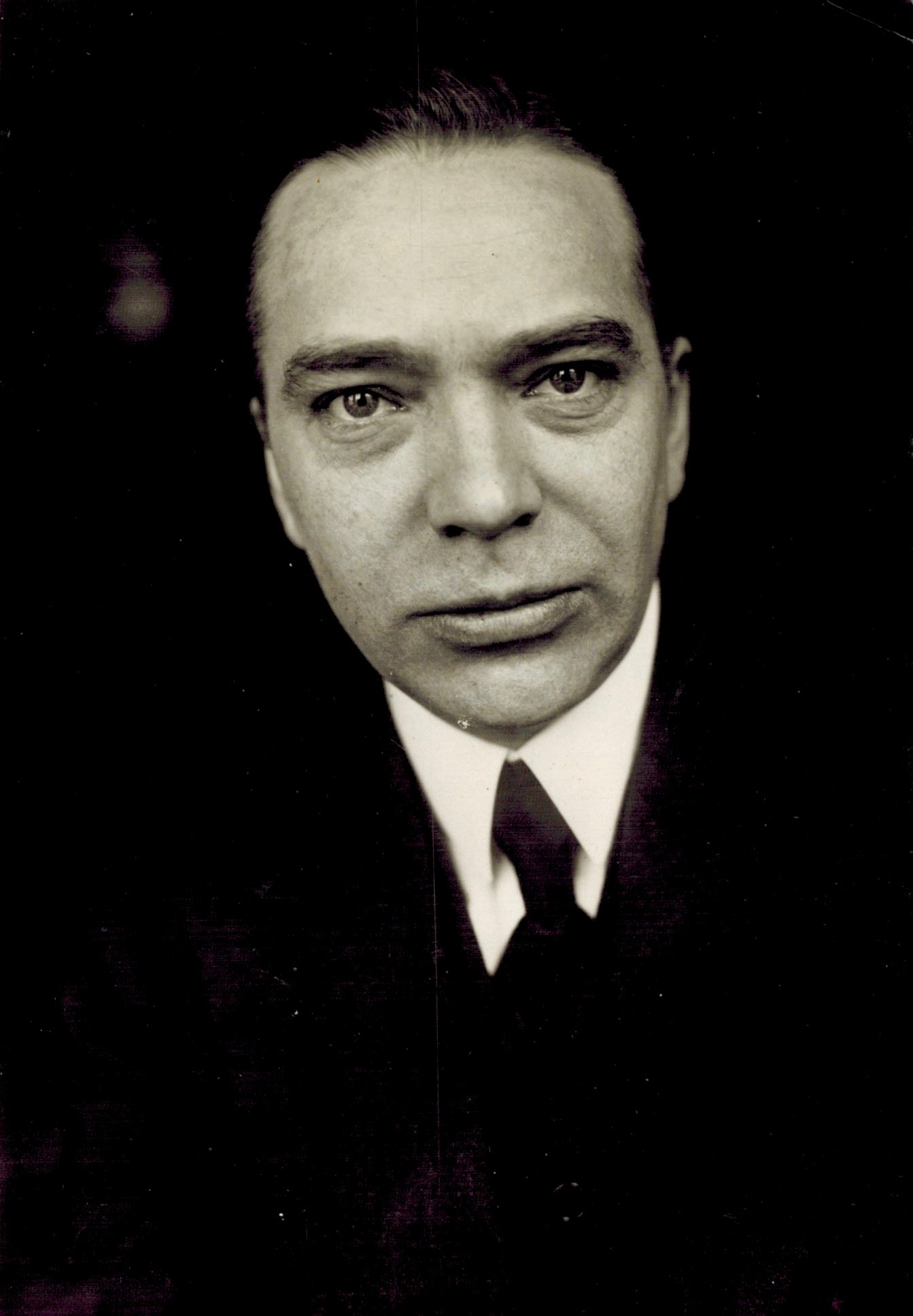
- Born: András Cseh; 12 September 1895; Marosludas, Kingdom of Hungary, Austro-Hungarian Empire
- Died: 9 March 1979 (aged 83); The Hague, Netherlands
- Occupation: Priest
- Known for: Teaching Esperanto

Andreo Cseh (born András Cseh; 12 September 1895 – 9 March 1979) was a Hungarian-Dutch Roman Catholic priest and Esperantist best known for developing the Cseh method, a direct method of teaching Esperanto that emphasizes oral practice and avoids translation.

== Biography ==
Cseh was born on 12 September 1895 in Marosludas, then part of the Kingdom of Hungary within Austria-Hungary. He became an Esperantist in 1910 and was ordained as a Catholic priest in 1919.

In 1920, while in Sibiu, he developed the Cseh method, a simplified, conversation-based approach to learning Esperanto. Due to its success, he was invited to Târgu Mureș and later to Cluj, where he organized Esperanto courses and helped revitalize the Romanian Esperanto movement. In 1922, he moved to Bucharest, where he co-founded the Romanian Esperanto Center (Esperanto: Esperanto-Centro Rumana) with Henriko Fischer-Galați.

Cseh became a chief delegate to the World Esperanto Association in 1921. In 1924, he received permission from his bishop to dedicate himself entirely to promoting Esperanto. He played a role in organizing several Esperanto World Congresses, including those in Geneva (1925), Danzig (1927), and Budapest (1929). His method gained popularity, and he was invited to teach across Europe, including in Sweden, where he led courses in parliament and at the invitation of local authorities.

By 1930, Cseh had settled in the Netherlands, where he co-founded the International Esperanto Institute (Esperanto: Internacia Esperanto-Instituto) with Julia Isbrücker and her husband. This led to conflicts with the World Esperanto Association, resulting in his exclusion from the 1931 World Congress in Kraków. Despite this, his influence in Esperanto education remained strong.

In 1932, Cseh founded and became the editor-in-chief of La Praktiko (Esperanto: Esperanto-Centro Rumana, an Esperanto magazine that was published until 1970. During the German occupation of the Netherlands, he and Isbrücker held a secret meeting in 1942 to establish Universala Ligo, a World Federalist organization advocating for international cooperation.

Cseh remained active in Esperanto education and advocacy throughout his life. He died on 9 March 1979 in The Hague, Netherlands. His teaching method continues to be used in Esperanto instruction today.

== Revocation and reinstatement of priesthood ==
While teaching Esperanto in the Netherlands, Cseh encountered opposition from J.D.J. Aengenent, the bishop of Haarlem, who objected to his courses being open to both Catholics and Protestants. Due to these concerns, Aengenent exercised his ecclesiastical authority to prohibit Cseh from continuing his work in the diocese. However, due to language barriers, Cseh misunderstood the order and continued teaching, leading to the revocation of his priesthood.

Decades later, in 1978, efforts were made to restore his status. With the support of local clergy, including Father Genemans, and the approval of Bishop Zwartkruis, Cseh's priesthood was reinstated on 6 January 1978.

== Cseh method ==
Andreo Cseh teaches Esperanto at the Esperanto house in Arnhem with the Cseh method

The Cseh method consists of:

1. Not using a textbook
2. Not using the students' native language, but instead explaining new words using words that have already been learned
3. Having the students answer in unison
4. Using conversation about current events rather than artificial examples
5. Thoroughly using humor and jokes
6. Allowing the students to discover the rules of the language and construct the grammatical system themselves

== Literature about Cseh and his method ==
- Esperanto en perspektivo ("Esperanto in perspective"), London, Rotterdam, 1974
- Enciklopedio de Esperanto ("Encyclopedia of Esperanto"), Budapest, 1933
- Vortoj de Andreo Cseh ("Words of Andreo Cseh"), Artur E. Iltis, Saarbrücken, 1984 / International Esperanto Institute, Hague, 2003
- Metodologio de lingvostudado kaj parolproprigo ("Methodology of language study and proper pronunciation"), D-ro I. Szerdahelyi, Budapest, 1975
- Memorlibro omaĝe al Andreo Cseh ("Memorial book in homage to Andreo Cseh"), edited with an attached text by Katalin Smidéliusz, Szombathely, 1995
- Vortoj de Andreo Cseh ("Words of Andreo Cseh"), Ed Borsboom, Internacia Esperanto-Instituto, 2003
- Vivo de Andreo Cseh ("Life of Andreo Cseh"), Ed Borsboom, Internacia Esperanto-Instituto, 2003
