= Zsolt Limperger =

Hungarian footballer

Personal information
- Date of birth: 13 September 1968 (age 58)
- Place of birth: Pápa, Hungary
- Position: Central defender

Senior career*
| Years | Team | Apps | (Gls) |
| 1984–1991 | Ferencváros | 112 | (6) |
| 1991–1994 | Real Burgos | 71 | (9) |
| 1994 | Celta Vigo | 1 | (0) |
| 1994–1996 | Real Mallorca | 22 | (2) |
| 1996–1998 | Ferencváros | 18 | (2) |
| Total | | 224 | (19) |

International career
| 1985 | Hungary U17 | 3 | (0) |
| 1989–1992 | Hungary | 22 | (1) |
- * Club domestic league appearances and goals

Zsolt Limperger (born 13 September 1968) is a Hungarian former footballer who played at both professional and international levels as a central defender. Active in both Hungary and Spain, Limperger made over 200 career appearances.

== Career ==
Born in Pápa, Limperger played club football in both Hungary and Spain for Ferencváros, Real Burgos, Celta Vigo and Real Mallorca.

Limperger earned 22 caps for Hungary between 1989 and 1992, appearing in four FIFA World Cup qualifying matches. He scored once at senior international level, against the United States in 1990. He also made three appearances at the 1985 FIFA U-16 World Championship.
