= Viktor Leonenko =

Footballer (born 1969)

Personal information
- Full name: Viktor Yevhenovych Leonenko
- Date of birth: 5 October 1969 (age 57)
- Place of birth: Tyumen, Soviet Union
- Height: 1.76 m (5 ft 9 in)
- Position: Forward

Youth career
- Geolog Tyumen

Senior career*
Years	Team	Apps	(Gls)
1988–1991	Geolog Tyumen	93	(26)
1991–1992	Dynamo Moscow	20	(14)
1992–1998	Dynamo Kyiv	98	(61)
1995–1998	→ Dynamo-2 Kyiv	45	(11)
1997	→ Dynamo-3 Kyiv	2	(0)
1998–2000	CSKA Kyiv	13	(5)
2001	Zakarpattia Uzhhorod	12	(3)
Total		281	(120)

International career
1992–1996	Ukraine	14	(6)
- * Club domestic league appearances and goals

Viktor Yevhenovych Leonenko (Ukrainian: Ві́ктор Євге́нович Лео́ненко; Russian: Виктор Евгеньевич Леоненко; born 5 October 1969) is a former footballer and Ukraine international who played as a forward. At least since 2006 he is a football commentator and analyst for the televised football forum "3 time" at the Ukrainian TV-network ICTV.

== Club career ==
Leonenko began his career with stints at Russian clubs such as Geolog Tyumen and Dynamo Moscow, before transferring to Dynamo Kyiv in 1992, where he played until 1998.

A successful forward for Dynamo in the early to mid 1990s – Leonenko was named Ukrainian Footballer of the Year in 1992, 1993, and 1994 – Leonenko was eventually forced to the bench with the emergence of the striker partnership of Serhii Rebrov and Andriy Shevchenko. In 1998, he moved to play for CSKA Kyiv and ended his career with Zakarpattia Uzhhorod in 2001.

== International career ==
Born in Russia, Leonenko chose to play for the Ukraine national team soon after transferring to Dynamo Kyiv. During his four years representing Ukraine from 1992 until 1996, Leonenko earned 14 caps and scored 6 goals.

== Career statistics ==
=== Club ===
Appearances and goals by club, season and competition
Club	Season	League			Cup (Note: Includes Soviet Cup, Russian Cup (football), Cup)		Europe		Total	
Club	Season	Division	Apps	Goals	Apps	Goals	Apps	Goals	Apps	Goals
Geolog Tyumen	1988	Soviet First League	17	0	1	0	–		18	0
Geolog Tyumen	1989	Soviet First League	35	11	1	0	–		36	11
Geolog Tyumen	1990	Soviet First League	33	12	0	0	–		33	12
Geolog Tyumen	1991	Soviet First League	8	3	0	0	–		8	3
Geolog Tyumen	Total		93	26	2	0	0	0	95	26
Dynamo Moscow	1991	Soviet Top League	16	9	1	0	6	0	23	9
Dynamo Moscow	1992	Russian Premier League	4	5	0	0	0	0	4	5
Dynamo Moscow	Total		20	14	1	0	6	0	27	14
Dynamo Kyiv	1992	Ukrainian Premier League	5	3	1	0	–		6	3
Dynamo Kyiv	1992–93	Ukrainian Premier League	27	16	5	5	4	3	36	24
Dynamo Kyiv	1993–94	Ukrainian Premier League	24	15	0	0	2	2	26	17
Dynamo Kyiv	1994–95	Ukrainian Premier League	20	17	3	0	6	3	29	20
Dynamo Kyiv	1995–96	Ukrainian Premier League	13	5	4	1	0	0	17	6
Dynamo Kyiv	1996–97	Ukrainian Premier League	9	5	0	0	4	0	13	5
Dynamo Kyiv	1997–98	Ukrainian Premier League	0	0	2	4	0	0	2	4
Dynamo Kyiv	Total		98	61	15	10	16	8	129	79
CSKA Kyiv	1998–99	Ukrainian Premier League	12	5	4	1	4	1	20	7
CSKA Kyiv	1999–2000	Ukrainian Premier League	1	0	0	0	–		1	0
CSKA Kyiv	Total		13	5	4	1	4	1	21	7
Zakarpattia	2000–01	Ukrainian First League	5	2	0	0	–		5	2
Zakarpattia	2001–02	Ukrainian Premier League	7	1	2	1	–		9	2
Zakarpattia	Total		12	3	2	1	0	0	14	4
Career total			236	109	24	12	26	9	286	130

=== International ===
Scores and results list Ukraine's goal tally first, score column indicates score after each Leonenko goal.

List of international goals scored by Viktor Leonenko
No.	Date	Venue	Opponent	Score	Result	Competition
1	18 May 1993	Žalgiris Stadium, Vilnius, Lithuania	Lithuania	1–1	2–1	Friendly
2	16 October 1993	A.J. Simeon Stadium, High Point, United States	United States	1–1	2–1	Friendly
3	16 October 1993	A.J. Simeon Stadium, High Point, United States	United States	2–1	2–1	Friendly
4	25 May 1994	Republican Stadium, Kyiv, Ukraine	Belarus	1–1	3–1	Friendly
5	13 August 1996	Republican Stadium, Kyiv, Ukraine	Lithuania	1–1	5–2	Friendly
6	13 August 1996	Republican Stadium, Kyiv, Ukraine	Lithuania	3–1	5–2	Friendly
