= Serhiy Bezhenar =

Ukrainian professional football player

Personal information
- Full name: Serhiy Bezhenar
- Date of birth: 9 August 1970 (age 56)
- Place of birth: Nikopol, Ukrainian SSR, Soviet Union
- Height: 1.82 m (5 ft 11 1/2 in)
- Position: Defender

Senior career*
Years	Team	Apps	(Gls)
1986	Kryvbas Kryviy Rih	8	(0)
1987–1988	Dnipro Dnipropetrovsk	3	(0)
1989	Dynamo Kyiv	0	(0)
1990–1994	Dnipro Dnipropetrovsk	128	(22)
1995–1998	Dynamo Kyiv	69	(8)
1997–1998	→ Dynamo-2 Kyiv	34	(2)
1997	→ Dynamo-3 Kyiv	1	(0)
1998	Vorskla Poltava	1	(0)
1998–1999	CSKA Kyiv	23	(2)
1998–1999	→ CSKA-2 Kyiv	2	(1)
1999	K.R.C. Mechelen	6	(0)
1999–2000	Erzurumspor	32	(0)
2001	Chernomorets Novorossiysk	10	(2)
2002–2003	Tavriya Simferopol	22	(0)
2003	Aktobe	17	(0)
2004	Fakel Ivano‑Frankivsk	4	(0)

International career
1990–1991	Soviet Union (U21)	6	(1)
1992–1997	Ukraine	23	(1)
Medal record
Men's football
Representing Soviet Union
FIFA U-16 World Championship
Winner	1987 Canada
UEFA European U-19 Championships
Winner	1988 Czechoslovakia
UEFA European U-16 Championships
Runner-up	1987 France
- * Club domestic league appearances and goals

Serhiy Bezhenar (Ukrainian: Сергій Миколайович Беженар, born 9 August 1970) is a Ukrainian former professional football player.

== Career ==
He played in defense, usually as a fullback. Even though he won four championships (1995, 1996, 1997, 1998) and two cups (1996, 1998) with Dynamo Kyiv, Bezhenar was more closely associated with FC Dnipro Dnipropetrovsk.

Bezhenar played for the Soviet Union national under-21 football team and then the Ukraine national football team. For the Soviet youth team he played 6 games all during the 1992 UEFA European Under-21 Championship. Bezhenar took part in the Ukraine's first ever match, a friendly against Hungary in 1992. In total, he earned 23 caps, and scored a single goal, a penalty, in a friendly game against Belarus in Kyiv in 1994. Since 2012, he has been a mentor of the Dynamo Kyiv Children's and Youth Sports School of different age categories, including U-17, U-16, and since 2021 U-14.

== Career statistics ==
=== Club ===
Season	Club	Country	Level	Apps	Goals
2004-05	FC Fakel Ivano‑Frankivsk	Ukraine	III
2003	FC Aktobe	Kazakhstan	I	17	0
2002-03	SC Tavriya Simferopol	Ukraine	I	22	0
2001	FC Chernomorets Novorossiysk	Russia	I	10	2
1999-00	Erzurumspor	Turkey	I	32	0
1998-99	FC CSKA Kyiv	Ukraine	I	23	1
1997–98	FC CSKA Kyiv	Ukraine	I	2	1
1997-98	FC Dynamo Kyiv	Ukraine	I	8	0
1996-97	FC Dynamo Kyiv	Ukraine	I	19	2
1995-96	FC Dynamo Kyiv	Ukraine	I	29	5
1994-95	FC Dynamo Kyiv	Ukraine	I	13	1
1994-95	Dnipro Dnipropetrovsk	Ukraine	I	17	6
1993-94	Dnipro Dnipropetrovsk	Ukraine	I	30	5
1992-93	Dnipro Dnipropetrovsk	Ukraine	I	37	8
1991	Dnipro Dnipropetrovsk	USSR	I	28	3
1990	Dnipro Dnipropetrovsk	USSR	I	16	0
1989	FC Dynamo Kyiv	USSR	I	0	0
1988	Dnipro Dnipropetrovsk	USSR	I	3	0

=== International ===
Appearances and goals by national team and year
National team	Year	Apps	Goals
Ukraine	1992	2	0
Ukraine	1993	3	0
Ukraine	1994	5	1
Ukraine	1995	3	0
Ukraine	1996	4	0
Ukraine	1997	6	0
Total		23	1

Scores and results list Ukraine's goal tally first, score column indicates score after each Bezhenar goal.

List of international goals scored by Serhiy Bezhenar
No.	Date	Venue	Opponent	Score	Result	Competition
1	25 May 1994	Republican Stadium, Kyiv, Ukraine	Belarus	2–1	3–1	Friendly
