= István Sallói =

Hungarian footballer (born 1966)

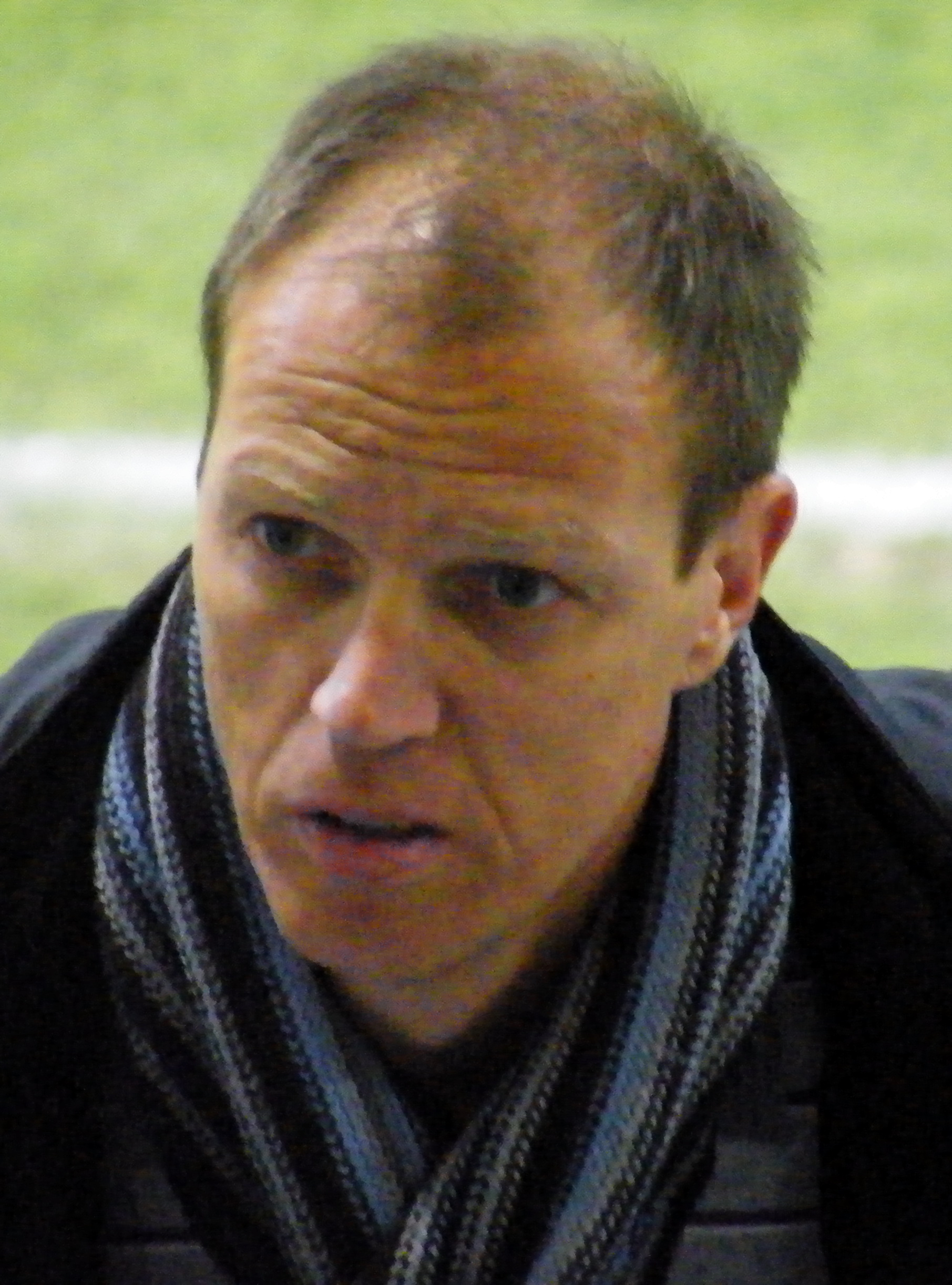
- Sallói in 2010

Personal information
- Full name: István Sallói
- Date of birth: 26 September 1966 (age 60)
- Place of birth: Oroszlány, Hungary
- Height: 1.87 m (6 ft 2 in)
- Position: Striker

Youth career
- Videoton FC

Senior career*
Years	Team	Apps	(Gls)
1985–1989	Videoton FC	54	(4)
1989–1990	Győri ETO FC	35	(8)
1990–1993	Videoton FC	77	(34)
1993–1994	Budapest Honvéd FC	22	(9)
1994–1999	Beitar Jerusalem F.C.	116	(59)
1999–2000	Maccabi Herzliya	47	(12)

International career
1992-1995	Hungary	13	(1)

Managerial career
- 2002-2004: Siófok FC
- 2004-2005: Újpest FC
- 2005-2007: Diósgyőri VTK
- 2007-2009: Újpest FC
- 2011-2015: Kecskeméti TE
- 2015: Dunaújvárosi PASE
- 2018-2021: Zalaegerszegi TE
- 2021-2022: MOL Fehérvár FC
- 2023-2025: Zalaegerszegi TE
- 2025-: NK Nafta 1903
- * Club domestic league appearances and goals

István Sallói (born 26 September 1966 in Oroszlány) is a former Hungarian football player. Sallói came from a footballing family with his grandfather playing in lower divisions before later becoming a referee. His father played in the Hungarian first league at Tatabanya FC.

== Playing career ==
Started his career at Videoton FC young team (1981) and became professional player 1986. Played for ETO FC GYOR (1988–1989) as loan player meanwhile he served his army duty at Győr. Returned to Videoton and became the captain and the leader in his home team. His best year was 1992-93 when he was invited to the national team and voted as the Player of the Year and finished 2nd best scorer. He signed for Honved with the aim to be champion and get an offer from abroad. End of the year of 1994 he accepted the offer from Beitar Jerusalem.

At Beitar Jerusalem F.C., he was known as ‘Stefan’ due to difficulties supporters and staff had pronouncing ‘István’. He spent five seasons with the club and became one of its most popular foreign players. Although he typically played in a supporting role behind the striker, he finished as Beitar’s top scorer during those seasons and remains the leading Israeli scorer in European competitions, with 12 goals. He concluded his career at Herzliya in 2000 after an 18-month spell there.

== Sporting director career ==
After his football career, he worked as the technical director of the National Team for Hungarian Football Federation. He left the federation and became the club manager (CEO) of SIÓFOK FC 2002-2004 . They promoted to first league in the first year and finished 5th position in top league next season. Although the successful seasons, the club got into financial crisis when the owner couldn't finances the club anymore. Sallói made a new business plan, releasing the expensive players and build a young team with a young coach, Aurel Csertoi. They finished the first part of the league in first place causing big surprise for everyone. Seeing his success with small club, Újpest FC, one of the biggest and most popular team in Hungary, offered him the CEO position in winter break and he took the job. Újpest FC started the second part of the league in 8th position without head coach who resigned in winter break. Sallói again, give the job to a young coach, Geza Meszoly who made excellent job with his team, winning the second part of the league and finished the 2nd place in the table at the end of the season. In 2005, when new owner arrived to the club, Sallói resigned. He moved to Diósgyőri VTK to a very popular team which was year by year in financial crisis. For that time Sallói was called in Hungary 'man who can manage the financial crisis'. He did the job again, stabilized the club and madeDiósgyőri VTK a stable mid table team. End of 2007, the new owner of Ujpest FC called him back to Újpest FC as a sport director. His task was to build a team who can win the league. Újpest FC finished in 2nd place after a year and made over 1 million euros profit on transfer fees. End of 2009, he joined to Wolverhampton Wanderers Football Club as an Eastern Europe scout. 2011 Sallói returned to Hungarian football and took a job in Kecskeméti TE as sport director until 2015. From July 2015 after Kecskemeti TE lost the licence for the Hungarian professional leagues, he signed for Dunaujvaros PASE as the sport director. In 2018 he became the sport director of the second league club Zalaegerszegi TE In the first season the team promoted to the first league after 7 years. In 2021 he moved and take the sporting director position of MOL Fehérvár FC 2023 he returned to Zalaegerszegi TE until 2025 june. from 2025 july he is the sporting director of NK Nafta 1903.

== Personal ==
Sallói is the father of Dániel Sallói, who currently plays football at Toronto FC.

== Honours ==
=== Player ===
Beitar Jerusalem

- Israeli Championship: 1996–97, 1997–98
- Toto Cup Al: 1997–98

Individual

- Hungarian Player of the Year: 1993

=== Manager ===
Siófok

- NB II: 2001–02 champion

Újpest FC

- NB I: Runner Up 2003-2004, 2008-2009

Kecskemét

- Magyar Kupa: 2010–11

Zalaegerszeg

- NB II: 2018–19 champion
- Magyar Kupa: 2022-23

NK Nafta Lendava

- NB II: 2025–26 promotion

Individual

- Hungarian Club Manager of the Year: 2004
