= Avanhard Stadium (Uzhhorod) =

Football stadium in Ukraine

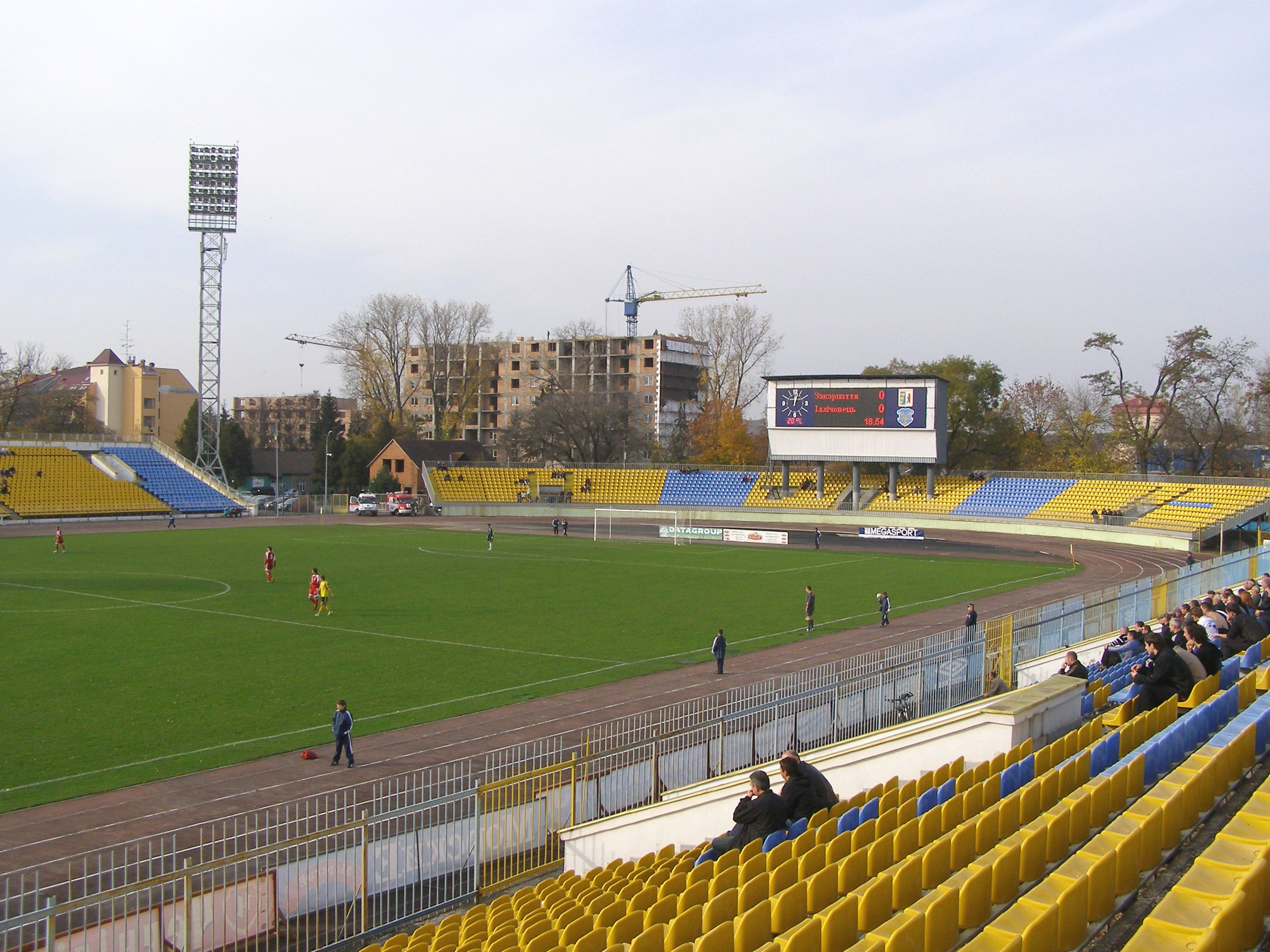
- Interactive map of Avanhard Stadium
- Location: Uzhorod, Ukraine
- Coordinates: 48°37′25″N 22°16′35″E
- Owner: City of Uzhorod
- Capacity: 10,383
- Surface: Grass
- Field size: 104 m × 68 m (341 ft × 223 ft)

Construction
- Opened: 1952
- Renovated: 2005
- Architects: Yevhen Valts, Emil Egresi, Sandor Kavac

Tenants
- FC Metalist Kharkiv (since 2023); FC Mynai (2020–2025); Zakarpattia Uzhhorod (1952–2016); Ukraine National (1992); Ukraine national rugby league team

Avanhard Stadium is a multi-purpose stadium in Uzhhorod, Ukraine. The stadium holds 12,000 people. The stadium is certified to hold matches of the national football team of Ukraine.

== History ==
The stadium was built in 1952, its architects are Yevhen Valts, Emil Egresi and Sandor Kavac. The size of the field is 104X68 m.

On 29 April 1992, the Ukraine national football team played its first international game after independence against Hungary at Avanhard Stadium lost by a score of 1–3.

The stadium was renovated in 2005.

In 2012 the stadium was leased to then highest playing (in Ukraine's top professional league, the Ukrainian Premier League) regional football club FC Hoverla Uzhhorod for the following 20 years. After Hoverla Uzhhorod ceased to exist following the 2015–16 Ukrainian Premier League season, this contract expired in May 2017 and was not renewed.

In 2020 professional football matches at the highest level (of Ukraine) returned to the stadium since FC Mynai played its home matches in the stadium. But this club relegated back to the Ukrainian First League after finishing second to last in the 2023–24 season; after four seasons in the top flight. In July 2025 Mynai withdrew from the 2025–26 Ukrainian First League and professional football altogether.

In 2020 the stadium was recertified to hold matches of the national football team of Ukraine. Currently the stadium is owned primarily by the municipal government.

== Ukraine national team matches ==
Date	Tournament	Host	Score	Guest
29 April 1992	F	Ukraine	1-3	Hungary

== Gallery ==
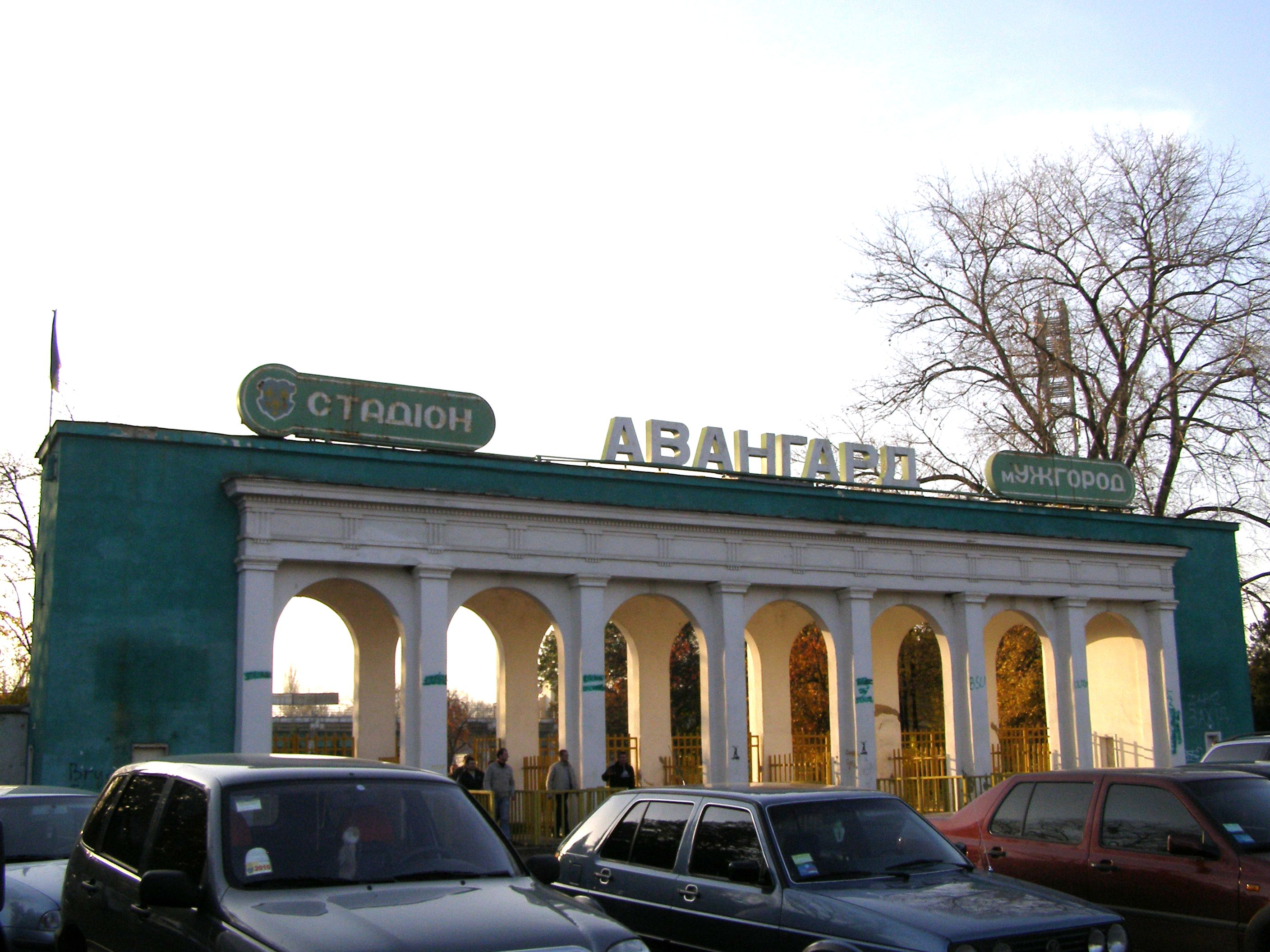
Entrance of the stadium

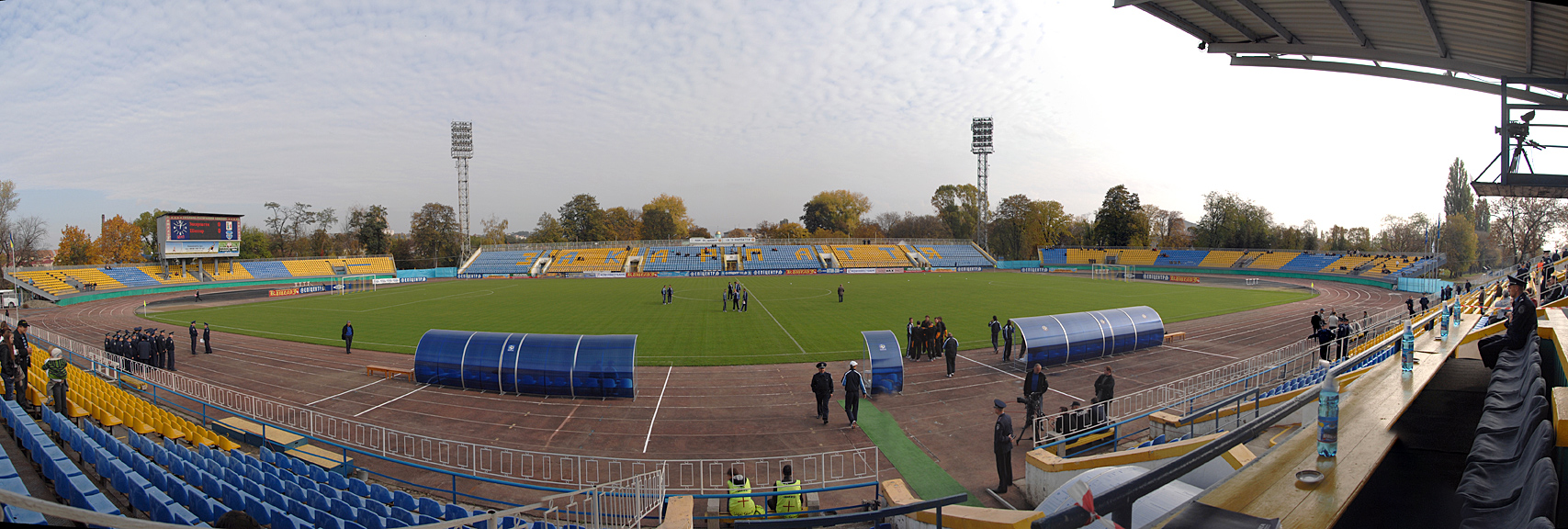
Panorama view inside the stadium in 2012

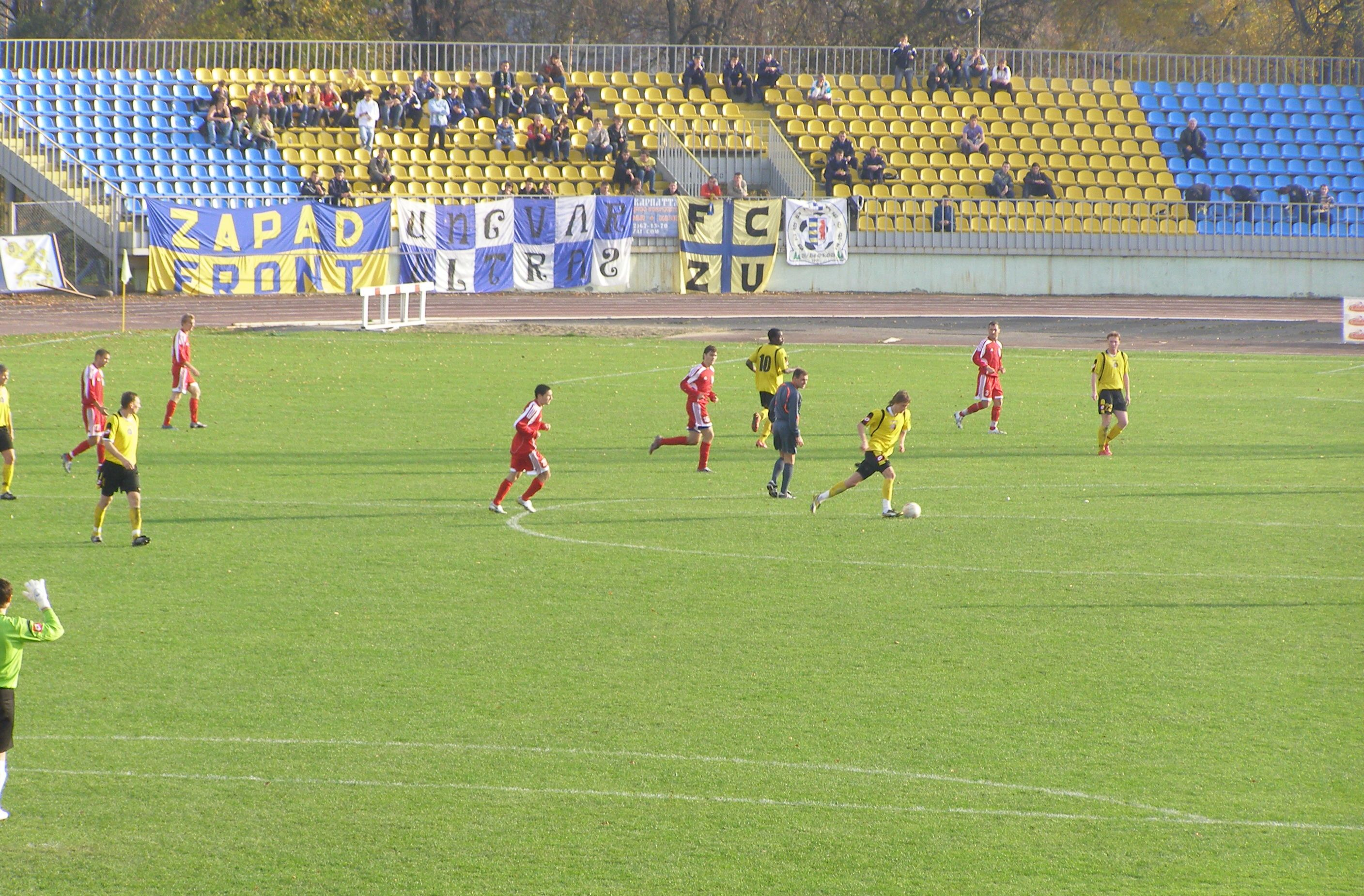
FC Zakarpattia Uzhhorod hosting FC Feniks-Illichovets Kalinine in November 2008
