= József Kiprich =

Hungarian footballer, manager, and scout

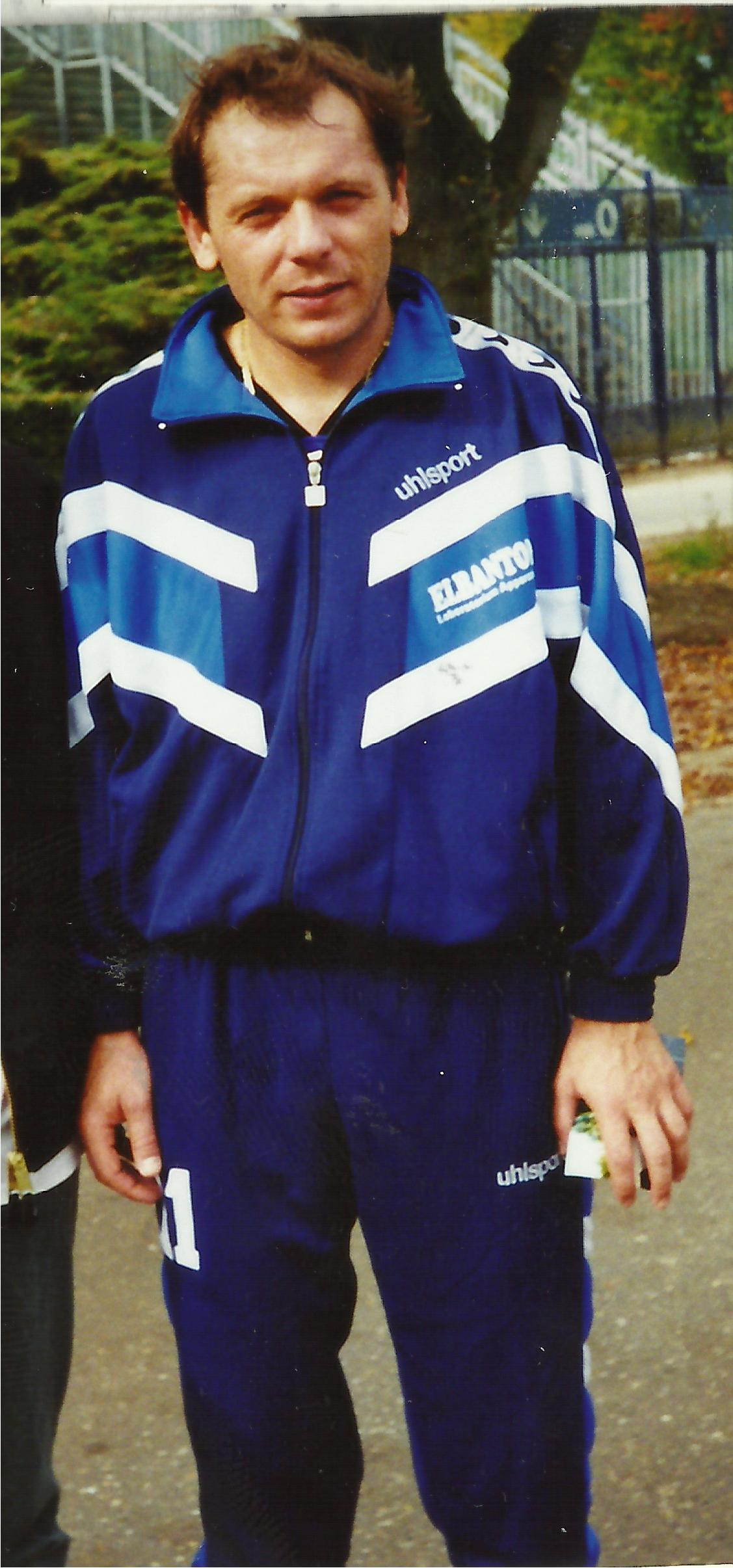
- Kiprich in 1997

Personal information
- Full name: József Kiprich
- Date of birth: 6 September 1963 (age 63)
- Place of birth: Tatabánya, Hungary
- Height: 1.80 m (5 ft 11 in)
- Position: Striker

Youth career
- Tatabányai Bányász

Senior career*
Years	Team	Apps	(Gls)
1980–1989	Tatabányai Bányász	180	(75)
1989–1995	Feyenoord	128	(53)
1995–1997	APOEL	40	(29)
1998	FC Den Bosch	9	(5)
1998–2001	Lombard FC Tatabánya	60	(28)
Total		422	(190)

International career^{‡}
1984–1995	Hungary	70	(28)

Managerial career
- 1999–2001: FC Tatabánya
- 2001: Vasas SC
- 2002–2003: Kecskeméti TE
- 2003: Olimpia Satu Mare
- 2003: Győri ETO
- 2004: Olimpia Satu Mare
- 2004: Diósgyőri VTK
- 2007–2008: Lombard-Pápa TFC
- 2008–2011: Gyirmót SE
- 2011–2012: FC Tatabánya
- 2012–2013: Kazincbarcikai SC
- 2014: Környe SE
- * Club domestic league appearances and goals as of 15 November 2006 ‡ National team caps and goals as of 15 November 2006

József Kiprich (born 6 September 1963) is a Hungarian football coach and scout and former player. He made his debut for the Hungarian national team in 1984, and got 70 caps and 28 goals until 1995. He was a participant at the 1986 FIFA World Cup in Mexico, where Hungary failed to progress from the group stage. During his career he won two national championships, five national cups, two super cups and he became top goalscorer in a league twice.

== Playing career ==
József Kiprich started his professional career at the age of 17 in the 1980/81 season at Tatabányai Bányász which played in the highest Hungarian League in football. During the following years Kiprich became a first team regular and a key player for the team. He became known as a goalscorer and made his debut in the national team of Hungary in 1984. He became top goalscorer in the Hungarian League in 1985, scoring 18 goals in 26 matches. In total he played nine seasons at Tatabánya before making his move to the Netherlands.

He had just played his first match in his 10th season at Tatabánya when Feyenoord Rotterdam got interested in signing him. Kiprich didn't hesitate and signed a contract and left Tatabánya for Rotterdam. Kiprich joined Feyenoord in what is known as the worst period in the club's history. Feyenoord, one of the clubs that has never been relegated were underperforming and close to the relegation zone of the Eredivisie when Kiprich joined the club. Kiprich made his debut on 20 August 1989 in Feyenoord's home match versus Fortuna Sittard. The match ended in another disappointing result for the fans as Fortuna Sittard won 0–2. The furious fans entered the pitch and chased the players and referees which were running towards the changing rooms. With Kiprich the team started performing slightly better and eventually ended the season in 11th position, securing their place in the Eredivisie, but missing out on European football for the first time in many years.

Despite the team's performances, Kiprich was loved and adored by the fans for his working rate, his occasional technical skills (while not being a technical footballer), his goalscoring abilities and his humour in the press. Soon he became one of the heroes of the team together with Ed de Goeij and John de Wolf.

Things went better in the 1990/91 season. Feyenoord was still struggling and was only able to finish in eighth position that season. Managers Pim Verbeek and Gunder Bengtsson were replaced by Wim Jansen and Feyenoord reached the KNVB Cup final, where BVV Den Bosch was beaten 1–0. Kiprich won his first trophy.

In 1991/92 Feyenoord finally was back among Ajax and PSV to form the traditional top-3 in Dutch football. The Dutch supercup was introduced and Feyenoord became the first winner of the event. In the Eredivisie Kiprich and his teammates were fighting for the Championship but finished the season in third position behind PSV which finished first and Ajax. The Feyenoord squad in that period turned out to be cup fighters and reached the final of the KNVB Cup again. This time Roda JC was beaten 3–0 in the final, Kiprich scored the third goal in this match. In the UEFA Cup Winners' Cup 1991-92 Feyenoord reached the semi-finals by beating KF Partizani Tirana, FC Sion and Tottenham Hotspur before falling to AS Monaco 3–3 on aggregate due to the away goals rule.

After the worst period in Feyenoord's history the club was becoming stronger every year, with József Kiprich as one of their key players. In 1992/93 Feyenoord did not win the KNVB Cup, but did perform well again in the UEFA Cup Winners' Cup 1992-93. Hapoel Petah Tikva and FC Lucerne were beaten while FC Spartak Moscow were the stronger side in the quarter-finals. Kiprich and Feyenoord were still able to win a trophy as they managed to win the Eredivisie Championship for the first time since 1984. Feyenoord's decisive match was played away to FC Groningen, with their stadium De Kuip being packed with fans who watched the match live on a huge screen, unique at that time. Feyenoord won the match 0–5, and Kiprich scored the first goal.

Feyenoord was able to catch up in the 1993/94 season, but eventually finished in second position in the league, three points behind winners Ajax. As the Dutch Champions Feyenoord played in the UEFA Champions League 1993-94 but were unable to reach the group stage after being beaten by FC Porto due to a 90th-minute strike by Domingos. Despite that Kiprich was still able to retain his average of winning one prize a season at Feyenoord as the KNVB Cup was won for the third time in four seasons, when NEC was beaten 2–1.

1994/95 was Kiprich's last season at Feyenoord. In this season he played one of his most memorable matches at Feyenoord although he only came in as a substitute late in the match. The team played PSV and were trailing 1-2 when Feyenoord was awarded a penalty. Kiprich who did not even do a warm-up came on the pitch and stepped up to take the penalty and scored the equaliser. He later managed to score the winning goal as well to finish the match in 3–2. Feyenoord finished fourth in the league that season, but managed to win another KNVB Cup. Feyenoord beat FC Volendam 2–1 in the final, which was Kiprich's last match at the club. After the celebrations and the cup was awarded the players took Kiprich on their shoulders and walked him all around the stadium under loud applauds. Kiprich came back to Feyenoord opening day at the start of the next season and the fans were begging him to return with chants, but he told them his skills were no longer good enough to play for Feyenoord.

Kiprich left for Cyprus to play at APOEL and after amazing performances he won the double in his first season, winning the Championship and the Cup. He was worshipped by the APOEL fans who appreciated his skills and passion. His 25 goals in 24 appearances also made him top goalscorer of the league. The next season APOEL won two more titles, the Super Cup and the Cup, but Kiprich played in 16 league matches and scored only 4 goals during that season.

He was not used in APOEL's 1997/98 campaign and he left Cyprus to go to Eerste Divisie side FC Den Bosch in the Netherlands where he played the last couple of matches of the season and scored 5 times in 9 games.

He then moved back to Hungary to play at his former team in Tatabánya that now was named Lombard FC Tatabánya. They were playing in the Raab-Karcher NB2, the second level of Hungarian football and won promotion to the highest level. Kiprich was appointed as the team's player manager and played another 36 matches in two seasons where he scored 11 goals.

== Manager career ==
While still a player at Lombard FC Tatabánya Kiprich was appointed as a player/manager in July 1999. In his first season, he finished on the fourth position of the Raab-Karcher NB1. The following season a new format was introduced, called the Professzionális Nemzeti Bajnokság. The competition was split in two groups and Kiprich finished with his team in the first position in his group, claiming six bonus points into the second stage of the Championship. Things went worse and Tatabánya was falling down in the rankings and Kiprich was sacked in March 2001. A few months later in July 2001 he was appointed as the manager of Vasas SC, where he was not able to lift the team to high performances and only won 15 points out of 22 matches and was fired in December 2001 as a result. In April 2002 he was appointed as the manager of second league club Kecskeméti FC which he successfully helped avoiding from relegation to the third level of Hungarian football.

In July 2003 Kiprich moved to Romania to manage Divizia B team Olimpia Satu Mare. Kiprich and his team did well, winning 15 points in six matches, but when Győri ETO FC in his home country was in need of a manager he switched back to Hungary. Kiprich won seven points at Györi in his first three matches at the team, before losing 1-0 versus Pécsi Munkás FC. As a result, in the next seven matches only five points were won and he was sacked. He returned to Olimpia Satu Mare and finished the season at the club this time, finishing in third position, but not clinching promotion. At the start of the 2004/05 season he started at Diósgyőri-Balaton FC in Hungary. Only three points out of the first seven matches of the season were won and Kiprich was fired again.

During 2005, Kiprich went back to his old love Feyenoord to become a scout for them in combination with a new job as the under-19 coach at Újpest FC.

== Career statistics ==
=== Club ===
Season	Club	Competition	Apps	Goals
1980/81	Tatabányai Bányász	Nemzeti Bajnokság 1	2	0
1981/82	Tatabányai Bányász	Nemzeti Bajnokság 1	19	2
1982/83	Tatabányai Bányász	Nemzeti Bajnokság 1	17	0
1983/84	Tatabányai Bányász	Nemzeti Bajnokság 1	24	8
1984/85	Tatabányai Bányász	Nemzeti Bajnokság 1	26	18
1985/86	Tatabányai Bányász	Nemzeti Bajnokság 1	27	13
1986/87	Tatabányai Bányász	Nemzeti Bajnokság 1	18	10
1987/88	Tatabányai Bányász	Nemzeti Bajnokság 1	24	14
1988/89	Tatabányai Bányász	Nemzeti Bajnokság 1	22	10
1989/90	Tatabányai Bányász	Nemzeti Bajnokság 1	1	0
1989/90	Feyenoord	Eredivisie	23	5
1990/91	Feyenoord	Eredivisie	25	7
1991/92	Feyenoord	Eredivisie	23	9
1992/93	Feyenoord	Eredivisie	25	18
1993/94	Feyenoord	Eredivisie	10	3
1994/95	Feyenoord	Eredivisie	22	11
1995/96	APOEL FC	Cypriot First Division	24	25
1996/97	APOEL FC	Cypriot First Division	17	4
1997/98	APOEL FC	Cypriot First Division	0	0
1997/98	FC Den Bosch	Eerste Divisie	9	5
1998/99	Lombard FC Tatabánya	Raab-Karcher NB2	24	17
1999/00	Lombard FC Tatabánya	Raab-Karcher NB1	24	5
2000/01	Lombard FC Tatabánya	Professzionális Nemzeti Bajnokság	12	6
Total			422	196

=== International ===
Appearances and goals by national team and year
National team	Year	Apps	Goals
Hungary	1984	3	0
Hungary	1985	7	1
Hungary	1986	4	1
Hungary	1987	6	1
Hungary	1988	11	5
Hungary	1989	5	0
Hungary	1990	6	4
Hungary	1991	5	5
Hungary	1992	10	5
Hungary	1993	5	1
Hungary	1994	3	1
Hungary	1995	3	1
Total		68	27

Scores and results list Hungary's goal tally first, score column indicates score after each Kiprich goal.

List of international goals scored by József Kiprich
No.	Date	Venue	Opponent	Score	Result	Competition	Ref.
1	17 April 1985	Gerhard Hanappi Stadium, Vienna, Austria	Austria	1–0	3–0	1986 FIFA World Cup qualification	
2	17 April 1985	Gerhard Hanappi Stadium, Vienna, Austria	Austria	2–0	3–0	1986 FIFA World Cup qualification	
3	8 December 1985	Estadio Sergio León Chávez, Irapuato, Mexico	South Korea	1–0	1–0	Friendly	
4	2 February 1986	Hamad bin Khalifa Stadium, Doha, Qatar	Qatar	–	2–2	Friendly	
5	2 December 1987	Üllői úti Stadion, Budapest, Hungary	Cyprus	1–0	1–0	UEFA Euro 1988 qualifying	
6	16 March 1988	Ferenc Puskás Stadium, Budapest, Hungary	Turkey	1–0	1–0	Friendly	
7	10 May 1988	Ferenc Puskás Stadium, Budapest, Hungary	Denmark	1–0	2–2	Friendly	
8	21 September 1988	Laugardalsvöllur, Reykjavík, Iceland	Iceland	1–0	3–0	Friendly	
9	21 September 1988	Laugardalsvöllur, Reykjavík, Iceland	Iceland	3–0	3–0	Friendly	
10	11 December 1988	National Stadium, Ta' Qali, Malta	Malta	2–1	2–2	1990 FIFA World Cup qualification	
11	5 September 1990	Megyeri úti Stadion, Budapest, Hungary	Turkey	3–0	4–1	Friendly	
12	5 September 1990	Megyeri úti Stadion, Budapest, Hungary	Turkey	4–1	4–1	Friendly	
13	31 October 1990	Hungária körúti stadion, Budapest, Hungary	Cyprus	3–1	4–2	UEFA Euro 1992 qualifying	
14	31 October 1990	Hungária körúti stadion, Budapest, Hungary	Cyprus	4–1	4–2	UEFA Euro 1992 qualifying	
15	27 March 1991	El Sardinero, Santander, Spain	Spain	1–0	4–2	Friendly	
16	27 March 1991	El Sardinero, Santander, Spain	Spain	3–1	4–2	Friendly	
17	3 April 1991	Tsirio Stadium, Limassol, Cyprus	Cyprus	2–0	2–0	UEFA Euro 1992 qualifying	
18	25 September 1991	Luzhniki Stadium, Moscow, Russia	Soviet Union	1–0	2–2	UEFA Euro 1992 qualifying	
19	25 September 1991	Luzhniki Stadium, Moscow, Russia	Soviet Union	2–2	2–2	UEFA Euro 1992 qualifying	
20	29 April 1992	Avanhard Stadium, Luhansk, Ukraine	Ukraine	2–0	3–1	Friendly	
21	29 April 1992	Avanhard Stadium, Luhansk, Ukraine	Ukraine	3–0	3–1	Friendly	
22	11 October 1992	Khalifa International Stadium, Doha, Qatar	Qatar	1–0	4–1	Friendly	
23	11 October 1992	Khalifa International Stadium, Doha, Qatar	Qatar	2–0	4–1	Friendly	
24	11 October 1992	Khalifa International Stadium, Doha, Qatar	Qatar	4–0	4–1	Friendly	
25	7 March 1993	Hakatanomori Athletic Stadium, Fukuoka, Japan	Japan	1–0	1–0	Friendly	
26	7 September 1994	Ferenc Puskás Stadium, Budapest, Hungary	Turkey	1–0	2–2	UEFA Euro 1996 qualifying	
27	29 March 1995	Ferenc Puskás Stadium, Budapest, Hungary	Switzerland	1–0	2–2	UEFA Euro 1996 qualifying	

== Honours ==
- Top goalscorer of the Nemzeti Bajnokság at Tatabányai Bányász in 1985
- Dutch Eredivisie winner at Feyenoord in 1993
- Dutch KNVB Cup winner at Feyenoord in 1991, 1992, 1994 and 1995
- Johan Cruijff-schaal at Feyenoord in 1991
- Cypriot First Division winner at APOEL in 1996
- Cypriot Cup winner at APOEL in 1996
- Cypriot Super Cup winner at APOEL in 1996
- Top goalscorer of the Cypriot First Division at APOEL in 1996
- Cypriot Cup winner at APOEL in 1997
- A Hat-trick trophy is named after him: József Kiprich Trophy

== Personal life ==
On his 60th birthday he received a gift from Viktor Orbán and he was celebrated at the newly built Tatabánya sports hall.

In 2022, he suffered a femoral hip fracture that made him use a wheelchair. However, he soon recovered and could start working again.
