= Kálmán Kovács (footballer, born 1965) =

Hungarian footballer

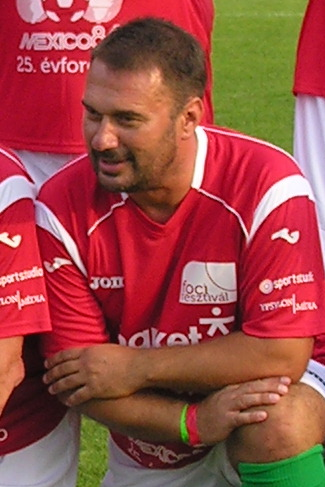

Personal information
- Date of birth: 11 September 1965 (age 61)
- Place of birth: Budapest, Hungary
- Height: 1.74 m (5 ft 8 1/2 in)
- Position: Forward

Senior career*
Years	Team	Apps	(Gls)
1983–1989	Budapest Honvéd	142	(39)
1989–1991	AJ Auxerre	83	(36)
1991–1992	Budapest Honvéd	10	(10)
1992–1993	FC Valenciennes	32	(8)
1993–1994	R. Antwerp F.C.	4	(1)
1994–1995	Budapest Honvéd	28	(19)
1995–1996	APOEL	24	(7)
1996–1997	SR Delémont	0	(0)
1997–1998	Budapest Honvéd	4	(1)
Total		327	(121)

International career
1982–1995	Hungary	56	(19)
- * Club domestic league appearances and goals

Kálmán Kovács (born 11 September 1965) is a retired Hungarian football player.

He made his debut for the Hungary national team in 1982, and got 56 caps and 19 goals until 1995. He was a participant at the 1986 FIFA World Cup in Mexico, where Hungary failed to progress from the group stage.

Following the end of his active career, he served as technical director at Honvéd and has lately been showing up as co-commentator and expert on several Hungarian TV channels, including during the 2006 World Cup.

== Honours ==
- Budapest Honvéd
  - Hungarian League: 1984, 1985, 1986, 1988, 1989
  - Hungarian Cup: 1985, 1989
- APOEL
  - Cypriot Championship: 1996
  - Cypriot Cup: 1996
  - Cyprus FA Shield: 1996
