= Tamás Mónos =

Hungarian football player

Personal information
- Date of birth: 3 January 1968 (age 58)
- Place of birth: Simontornya
- Position: Midfielder

Senior career*
| Years | Team | Apps | (Gls) |
| 1988–1990 | Veszprém FC | | |
| 1990–1991 | K.F.C. Germinal Ekeren | | |
| 1991–1993 | R.F.C. de Liège | | |
| 1993–2001 | Vasas SC | | |

International career
| 1990–1995 | Hungary | 21 | (0) |
- * Club domestic league appearances and goals

Tamás Mónos (born 3 January 1968) is a retired Hungarian football midfielder.
