= 1998 FIFA World Cup qualification =

Tournament details
- Dates: 10 March 1996 – 29 November 1997
- Teams: 174 (from 6 confederations)

Tournament statistics
- Matches played: 644
- Goals scored: 1,925 (2.99 per match)
- Top scorer(s): (Iran) Karim Bagheri (19 goals)

The 1998 FIFA World Cup qualification competition was a series of tournaments organised by the six FIFA confederations. Each confederation — the AFC (Asia), CAF (Africa), CONCACAF (North, Central America and Caribbean), CONMEBOL (South America), OFC (Oceania), and UEFA (Europe) — was allocated a certain number of the 32 places at the 1998 FIFA World Cup. 174 teams entered the qualification rounds, while two places were reserved for France and Brazil as host nation and defending champions, respectively.

== Qualified teams ==
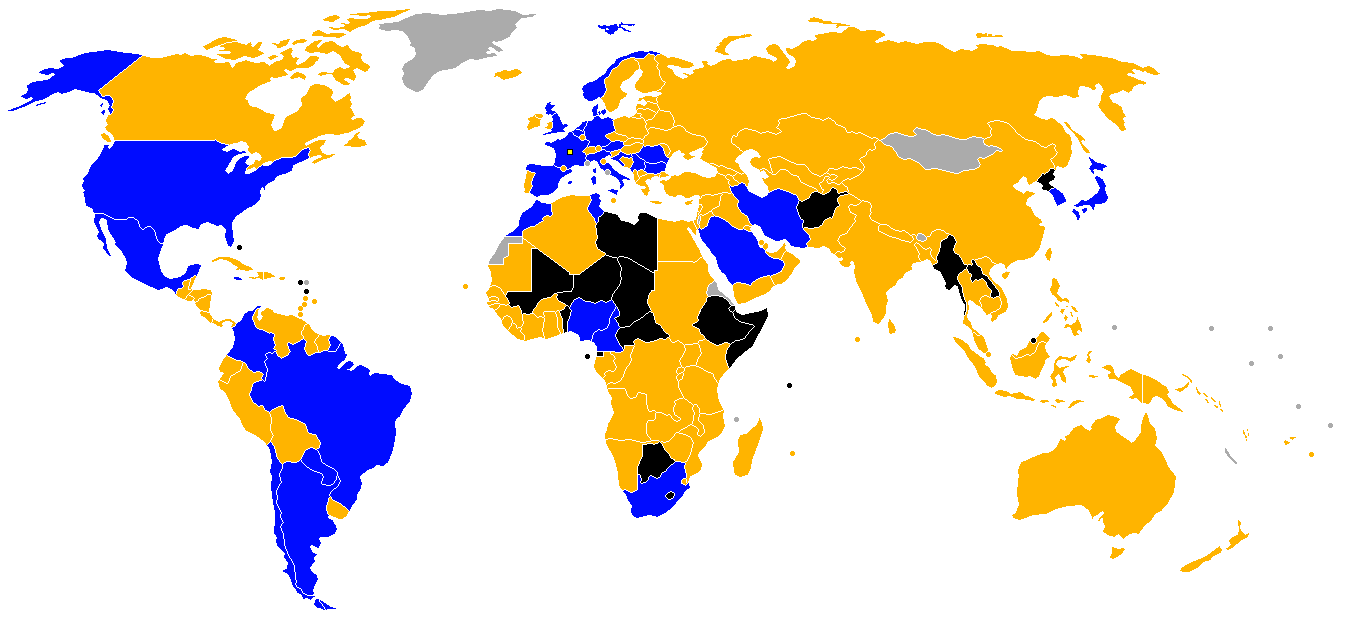
Country qualified for World Cup Country failed to qualify Country did not enter World Cup Country not a FIFA member

Team	Method of qualification	Date of qualification	Finals appearance	Last appearance	Consecutive finals appearances	Previous best performance	FIFA ranking at start of event
France	Host	2 July 1992	10th	1986	1	Third place (1958, 1986)	18
Brazil	1994 FIFA World Cup winners	17 July 1994	16th	1994	16	Winners (1958, 1962, 1970, 1994)	1
Nigeria	CAF final round group 1 winners	7 June 1997	2nd	1994	2	Round of 16 (1994)	74
Tunisia	CAF final round group 2 winners	8 June 1997	2nd	1978	1	Group stage (1978)	21
Morocco	CAF final round group 5 winners	8 June 1997	4th	1994	2	Round of 16 (1986)	13
South Africa	CAF final round group 3 winners	16 August 1997	1st	—	1	—	24
Cameroon	CAF final round group 4 winners	17 August 1997	4th	1994	3	Quarter-finals (1990)	49
Romania	UEFA group 8 winners	18 August 1997	7th	1994	3	Quarter-finals (1994)	22
Norway	UEFA group 3 winners	6 September 1997	3rd	1994	2	*First round (1938, 1994)	7
Bulgaria	UEFA group 5 winners	10 September 1997	7th	1994	2	Fourth place (1994)	35
Argentina	CONMEBOL winners	10 September 1997	12th	1994	7	Winners (1978, 1986)	6
Colombia	CONMEBOL 3rd place	10 September 1997	4th	1994	3	Round of 16 (1990)	10
Paraguay	CONMEBOL 2nd place	10 September 1997	5th	1986	1	Round of 16 (1986)	29
Denmark	UEFA group 1 winners	11 October 1997	2nd	1986	1	Round of 16 (1986)	27
England	UEFA group 2 winners	11 October 1997	10th	1990	1	Winners (1966)	5
Austria	UEFA group 4 winners	11 October 1997	7th	1990	1	Third place (1954)	31
Spain	UEFA group 6 winners	11 October 1997	10th	1994	6	Fourth place (1950)	15
Netherlands	UEFA group 7 winners	11 October 1997	7th	1994	3	Runners-up (1974, 1978)	25
Germany	UEFA group 9 winners	11 October 1997	14th	1994	12	Winners (1954, 1974, 1990)	2
Scotland	UEFA group 4 runners-up	11 October 1997	8th	1990	1	Group stage (1954, 1958, 1974, 1978, 1982, 1986, 1990)	41
Mexico	CONCACAF fourth round winners	12 October 1997	11th	1994	2	Quarter-finals (1970, 1986)	4
South Korea	AFC final round group B winners	18 October 1997	5th	1994	4	Group stage (1954, 1986, 1990, 1994)	20
United States	CONCACAF fourth round 2nd place	9 November 1997	6th	1994	3	Third place (1930)	11
Saudi Arabia	AFC final round group A winners	12 November 1997	2nd	1994	2	Round of 16 (1994)	34
Croatia	UEFA play-off winners	15 November 1997	1st	—	1	—	19
Italy	UEFA play-off winners	15 November 1997	14th	1994	10	Winners (1934, 1938, 1982)	14
Belgium	UEFA play-off winners	15 November 1997	10th	1994	5	Fourth place (1986)	36
FR Yugoslavia	UEFA play-off winners	15 November 1997	9th	1990	1	Fourth place (1930, 1962)	8
Japan	AFC play-off winners	16 November 1997	1st	—	1	—	12
Jamaica	CONCACAF fourth round 3rd place	16 November 1997	1st	—	1	—	30
Chile	CONMEBOL 4th place	16 November 1997	7th	1982	1	Third place (1962)	9
Iran	AFC v OFC play-off winners	29 November 1997	2nd	1978	1	Group stage (1978)	42

- Norway was eliminated from the group stage of the 1994 World Cup, while they exited the 1938 tournament in the first round of what was then a pure knockout tournament.

== Qualification process ==
The distribution by confederation for the 1998 FIFA World Cup was:

- AFC (Asia): 3 or 4 places
- CAF (Africa): 5 places
- CONCACAF (North America): 3 places
- CONMEBOL (South America): 4 places (+ Brazil qualified automatically as 1994 FIFA World Cup winners for a total of 5 places)
- OFC (Oceania): 0 or 1 place(s)
- UEFA (Europe): 14 places (+ France qualified automatically as host nation for a total of 15 places)

== Confederation qualification ==
=== AFC ===
A total of 36 teams entered the competition. The Asian zone was allocated 3.5 places (out of 32) in the final tournament.

There were three rounds of play:

- First round: The 36 teams were divided into 10 groups of 3 or 4 teams each. The teams played against each other twice, except in Group 10, where the teams played against each other once. The group winners would advance to the final round.
- Second round: The 10 teams were divided into 2 groups of 5 teams. The teams played against each other on a home-and-away basis. The group winners would qualify. The runners-up would advance to the AFC play-off.
- Third round: The two teams played against each other once in Malaysia. The winner would qualify. The loser would advance to the AFC–OFC intercontinental play-offs.

==== Final positions (second round) ====
Legend
Countries that qualified for the 1998 World Cup
Countries that advanced to the third round

Group A

Team	Pld	Pts
Saudi Arabia	8	14
Iran	8	12
China	8	11
Qatar	8	10
Kuwait	8	8

Group B

Team	Pld	Pts
South Korea	8	19
Japan	8	13
United Arab Emirates	8	9
Uzbekistan	8	6
Kazakhstan	8	6

==== Third round ====
Team 1	Score	Team 2
Iran	2–3 (a.e.t.)	Japan

=== CAF ===
A total of 38 CAF teams entered the competition. However, Mali and Niger both withdrew before the draw was made. The African Zone was allocated five places (out of 32) in the final tournament.

There would be two rounds of play:

- First round: Cameroon, Nigeria, Morocco and Egypt, the four highest-ranked teams according to FIFA, received byes and advanced to the final round directly. The remaining 32 teams were paired up to play knockout matches on a home-and-away basis. The winners would advance to the final round.
- Final round: The 20 teams were divided into five groups of four teams each. The teams would play against each other on a home-and-away basis. The group winners would qualify.

Legend
Countries that qualified for the 1998 World Cup

==== Final positions (final round) ====
Group 1
Group 2
Group 3

Team	Pld	Pts
Nigeria	6	13
Guinea	6	12
Kenya	6	10
Burkina Faso	6	0

Team	Pld	Pts
Tunisia	6	16
Egypt	6	10
Liberia	6	4
Namibia	6	4

Team	Pld	Pts
South Africa	6	13
Congo	6	10
Zambia	6	8
DR Congo	6	2

Group 4
Group 5

Team	Pld	Pts
Cameroon	6	14
Angola	6	10
Zimbabwe	6	4
Togo	6	4

Team	Pld	Pts
Morocco	6	16
Sierra Leone	5	7
Ghana	6	6
Gabon	5	1

=== CONCACAF ===
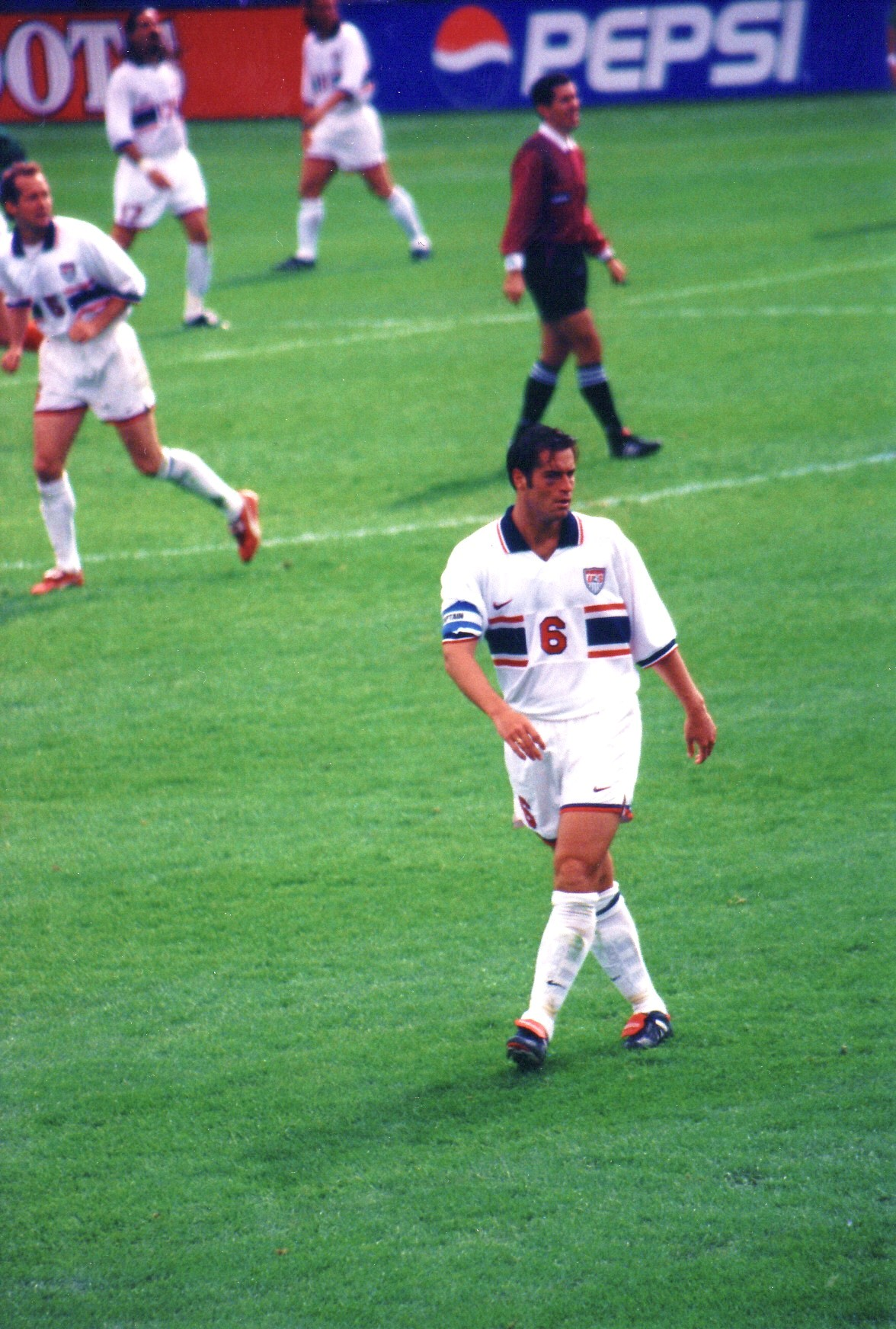
John Harkes playing for the United States in a fourth round qualifying match against Mexico on April 20, 1997

A total of 30 CONCACAF teams entered the competition. Mexico, the US, Costa Rica, Honduras, El Salvador and Canada, the six highest-ranked teams according to FIFA, received byes and advanced to the third round directly. The remaining 24 teams were divided into two zones, based on geographical locations, as follows:

- Caribbean Zone: The 20 teams played in three rounds of knockout matches on a home-and-away basis to determine four winners advancing to the third round.
- Central American Zone: The four teams were paired up to play knockout matches on a home-and-away basis. The winners would advance to the third round.

In the third round, the 12 teams were divided into three groups of four teams each. They played against each other on a home-and-away basis. The group winners and runners-up would advance to the final round.

In the final round, the six teams played against each other on a home-and-away basis. The top three teams would qualify.

Legend
Countries that qualified for the 1998 World Cup

==== Final positions (fourth round) ====
Team	Pld	Pts
Mexico	10	18
United States	10	17
Jamaica	10	14
Costa Rica	10	12
El Salvador	10	10
Canada	10	6

=== CONMEBOL ===
A total of 10 CONMEBOL teams entered the competition. The South American zone was allocated 5 places (out of 32) in the final tournament. Brazil, the defending champions, qualified automatically, leaving 4 spots open for competition between 9 teams.

The rules were very simple. The 9 teams would play against each other on a home-and-away basis. The top 4 teams would qualify.

Legend
Countries that qualified for the 1998 World Cup

==== Final positions ====
Team	Pld	Pts
Argentina	16	30
Paraguay	16	29
Colombia	16	28
Chile	16	25
Peru	16	25
Ecuador	16	21
Uruguay	16	21
Bolivia	16	17
Venezuela	16	3

=== OFC ===
A total of 10 teams entered the competition. The Oceanian zone was allocated 0.5 places (out of 32) in the final tournament.

There were three rounds of play:

- First round: Australia, New Zealand, Fiji and Tahiti, the four best ranked teams according to FIFA, received byes and advanced to the second round directly. The remaining 6 teams were divided into 2 groups of 3 teams each, namely the Melanesian Group and the Polynesian Group, based on geographical considerations. The teams played against each other once. The winner of the Melanesian Group would advance to the second round. The runner-up of the Melanesian Group and the winner of the Polynesian Group would advance to the first round play-off. In the play-off, they played against each other on a home-and-away basis. The winner would advance to the second round.
- Second round: The 6 teams were divided into 2 groups of 3 teams each. The teams played against each other twice. The group winners would advance to the final round.
- Final round: The 2 teams played against each other on a home-and-away basis. The winner would advance to the AFC / OFC intercontinental play-off.

==== Final positions (third round) ====
Team 1	Agg.	Team 2	1st leg	2nd leg
New Zealand	0–5	Australia	0–3	0–2

=== UEFA ===
A total of 50 UEFA teams entered the competition. The European zone was allocated 15 places (out of 32) in the final tournament. France, the hosts, qualified automatically, leaving 14 spots open for competition between 49 teams.

The 49 teams were divided into nine groups, four groups of six teams and five groups of five teams. The teams would play against each other on a home-and-away basis. The group winners would qualify. The runners-up would be ranked according to their records against the 1st, 3rd and 4th-placed team in their groups, and the team with the best record would also qualify. The remaining runners-up would advance to the UEFA Play-offs.

In the play-offs, the 8 teams were paired up to play knockout matches on a home-and-away basis. The winners would qualify.

Legend
Countries that qualified for the 1998 World Cup
Countries that advanced to the Play-offs

==== Final positions (first round) ====
Group 1
Team	Pld	Pts
Denmark	8	17
Croatia	8	15
Greece	8	14
Bosnia and Herzegovina	8	9
Slovenia	8	1

Group 2
Team	Pld	Pts
England	8	19
Italy	8	18
Poland	8	10
Georgia	8	10
Moldova	8	0

Group 3
Team	Pld	Pts
Norway	8	20
Hungary	8	12
Finland	8	11
Switzerland	8	10
Azerbaijan	8	3

Group 4
Team	Pld	Pts
Austria	10	25
Scotland	10	23
Sweden	10	21
Latvia	10	10
Estonia	10	4
Belarus	10	4

Group 5
Team	Pld	Pts
Bulgaria	8	18
Russia	8	17
Israel	8	13
Cyprus	8	10
Luxembourg	8	0

Group 6
Team	Pld	Pts
Spain	10	26
FR Yugoslavia	10	23
Czech Republic	10	16
Slovakia	10	16
Faroe Islands	10	6
Malta	10	0

Group 7
Team	Pld	Pts
Netherlands	8	19
Belgium	8	18
Turkey	8	14
Wales	8	7
San Marino	8	0

Group 8
Team	Pld	Pts
Romania	10	28
Republic of Ireland	10	18
Lithuania	10	17
Macedonia	10	13
Iceland	10	9
Liechtenstein	10	0

Group 9
Team	Pld	Pts
Germany	10	22
Ukraine	10	20
Portugal	10	19
Armenia	10	8
Northern Ireland	10	7
Albania	10	4

==== Play-offs ====
Team 1	Agg.	Team 2	1st leg	2nd leg
Croatia	3–1	Ukraine	2–0	1–1
Russia	1–2	Italy	1–1	0–1
Republic of Ireland	2–3	Belgium	1–1	1–2
Hungary	1–12	FR Yugoslavia	1–7	0–5

== Inter-confederation play-offs: AFC v OFC ==
It was a two-legged home-and-away tie between the winners of the Oceania qualifying tournament, Australia, and the losing team in the AFC play-off from the Asian qualifying tournament, Iran. The games were played on 22 and 29 November 1997 in Tehran and Melbourne respectively. Australia was hoping to play in the FIFA World Cup for the first time since 1974 and Iran in 1978. The second game is known in Iran as the Saga of Melbourne.

Team 1	Agg.	Team 2	1st leg	2nd leg
Iran	3–3 (a)	Australia	1–1	2–2

== Top goalscorers ==
19 goals

- (Iran) Karim Bagheri

14 goals

- (Japan) Kazuyoshi Miura
- (Serbia and Montenegro) Predrag Mijatović

12 goals

- (Chile) Iván Zamorano

11 goals

- (Chile) Marcelo Salas
- (Mexico) Carlos Hermosillo

6 goals

- (El Salvador) Raúl Díaz Arce
- (Iran) Ali Daei
- (Serbia and Montenegro) Savo Milošević
- (South Korea) Choi Yong-soo
