= Belgium national football team results (1990–1999) =

- Win Draw Loss

In the 1990s, the Belgium national football team played at all three World Cups, but missed out on Euro 1992 and Euro 1996. They also appeared at three minor tournaments.

The overall match balance is positive with 36 wins versus 30 losses (and 23 draws).

== Results ==
89 matches played:

	Legend for encounters
S.O.	Summer Olympics
W.C.	FIFA World Cup
EURO	UEFA European Football Championship
CC	Confederations Cup
TB	Tie-break match
Q	Qualification rounds
R + number	Round number
FR	Final Round
GS	Group Stage
1/16	Round of 32
1/8	Round of 16
QF	Quarter-final
SF	Semi-final
F	Final
RP	Repechage
Rep.	Replay match
3rd-4th	Third place match

=== 1990 ===
17 January 1990 Friendly	Greece	2–0	Belgium	Athens, Greece
17:00 UTC+2	Tsalouchidis 58'; Apostolakis 90'	Report		Stadium: Spyros Louis Olympic Stadium; Attendance: 2,000; Referee: Pietro D'Elia (Italy)

21 February 1990 Friendly	Belgium	0–0	Sweden	Brussels, Belgium
20:00 UTC+1		Report		Stadium: Heysel Stadium; Attendance: 3,537; Referee: Friedrich Kaupe (Austria)

26 May 1990 Friendly	Belgium	2–2	Romania	Brussels, Belgium
19:00 UTC+2	Scifo 7' (pen.); Clijsters 29'	Report	Rednic 53'; Lăcătuş 64' (pen.)	Stadium: Heysel Stadium; Attendance: 31,625; Referee: Alain Delmer (France)

2 June 1990 Friendly	Belgium	3–0	Mexico	Brussels, Belgium
20:00 UTC+2	Degryse 36', 38'; Versavel 50'	Report		Stadium: Heysel Stadium; Attendance: 32,816; Referee: Jan Damgaard (Denmark)

6 June 1990 Friendly	Belgium	1–1	Poland	Brussels, Belgium
20:00 UTC+2	Emmers 51'	Report	Ziober 16'	Stadium: Heysel Stadium; Attendance: 17,634; Referee: Roger Philippi (Luxembourg)

17 June 1990 W.C. 1990 GS	Belgium	2–0	South Korea	Verona, Italy
17:00 UTC+2	Degryse 53'; De Wolf 64'	Report		Stadium: Stadio Marc'Antonio Bentegodi; Attendance: 32,486; Referee: Vincent Mauro (United States)

17 June 1990 W.C. 1990 GS	Belgium	3–1	Uruguay	Verona, Italy
21:00 UTC+2	Clijsters 15'; Scifo 22'; Ceulemans 46'	Report	Bengoechea 72'	Stadium: Stadio Marc'Antonio Bentegodi; Attendance: 33,759; Referee: Siegfried Kirschen (East Germany)

21 June 1990 W.C. 1990 GS	Belgium	1–2	Spain	Verona, Italy
17:00 UTC+2	Vervoort 29'	Report	Míchel 26' (pen.); Górriz 38'	Stadium: Stadio Marc'Antonio Bentegodi; Attendance: 35,950; Referee: Juan Carlos Loustau (Argentina)

26 June 1990 W.C. 1990 1/8	England	1–0 (a.e.t.)	Belgium	Bologna, Italy
21:00 UTC+2	Platt 119'	Report		Stadium: Stadio Renato Dall'Ara; Attendance: 34,520; Referee: Peter Mikkelsen (Denmark)

12 September 1990 Friendly	Belgium	0–2	East Germany	Anderlecht, Belgium
19:45 UTC+2		Report	Sammer 74', 89'	Stadium: Constant Vanden Stock Stadium; Attendance: 12,000; Referee: John Blankenstein (Netherlands)

17 October 1990 EURO 1992 Q	Wales	3–1	Belgium	Cardiff, Wales
19:30 UTC+1	Rush 29'; Saunders 86'; Hughes 88'	Report	Versavel 24'	Stadium: Cardiff Arms Park; Attendance: 14,274; Referee: Kurt Röthlisberger (Switzerland)

=== 1991 ===
13 February 1991 Friendly	Italy	0–0	Belgium	Terni, Italy
20:15 UTC+1		Report		Stadium: Stadio Libero Liberati; Attendance: 20,788; Referee: Stavros Zakestidis (Greece)

27 February 1991 EURO 1992 Q	Belgium	3–0	Luxembourg	Anderlecht, Belgium
20:00 UTC+1	Vandenbergh 7'; Ceulemans 16'; Scifo 35'	Report		Stadium: Constant Vanden Stock Stadium; Attendance: 11,105; Referee: Loizos Loizou (Cyprus)

27 March 1991 EURO 1992 Q	Belgium	1–1	Wales	Anderlecht, Belgium
20:00 UTC+1	Degryse 48'	Report	Saunders 60'	Stadium: Constant Vanden Stock Stadium; Attendance: 18,591; Referee: Emilio Soriano Aladrén (Spain)

1 May 1991 EURO 1992 Q	Germany	1–0	Belgium	Hannover, Germany
18:15 UTC+2	Matthäus 3'	Report		Stadium: Niedersachsenstadion; Attendance: 52,363; Referee: Zoran Petrović (Yugoslavia)

11 September 1991 EURO 1992 Q	Luxembourg	0–2	Belgium	Luxembourg City, Luxembourg
20:00 UTC+2		Report	Scifo 25'; Degryse 49'	Stadium: Stade Josy Barthel; Attendance: 6,872; Referee: Rémi Harrel (France)

9 October 1991 Friendly	Hungary	0–2	Belgium	Székesfehérvár, Hungary
20:00 UTC+2		Report	Emmers 7'; Scifo 75'	Stadium: Stadion Sóstói; Attendance: 7,000; Referee: Itzhak Ben Itzhak (Israel)

20 November 1991 EURO 1992 Q	Belgium	0–1	Germany	Anderlecht, Belgium
20:00 UTC+1		Report	Völler 16'	Stadium: Constant Vanden Stock Stadium; Attendance: 16,138; Referee: Tullio Lanese (Italy)

=== 1992 ===
26 February 1992 Friendly	Tunisia	2–1	Belgium	Tunis, Tunisia
19:00 UTC+1	Rouissi 31'; Genaux 75' (o.g.)	Report	Oliveira 58'	Stadium: Stade Olympique d'El Menzah; Attendance: 35,000; Referee: Abdelali Naciri (Morocco)

25 March 1992 Friendly	France	3–3	Belgium	Paris, France
19:45 UTC+2	Papin 40' (pen.), 82'; Vahirua 45'	Report	Albert 28'; Scifo 44' (pen.); Wilmots 48'	Stadium: Parc des Princes; Attendance: 25,000; Referee: Philip Don (England)

22 April 1992 W.C. 1994 Q	Belgium	1–0	Cyprus	Anderlecht, Belgium
19:45 UTC+2	Wilmots 24'	Report		Stadium: Constant Vanden Stock Stadium; Attendance: 15,314; Referee: Manuel Díaz Vega (Spain)

3 June 1992 W.C. 1994 Q	Faroe Islands	0–3	Belgium	Toftir, Faroe Islands
19:45 UTC+2		Report	Albert 30'; Wilmots 65', 71'	Stadium: Svangaskarð; Attendance: 5,156; Referee: Leslie Mottram (Scotland)

2 September 1992 W.C. 1994 Q	Czechoslovakia	1–2	Belgium	Prague, Czechoslovakia
18:00 UTC+2	Kadlec 77'	Report	Chovanec 45' (o.g.); Czerniatynski 83'	Stadium: Stadion Evžena Rošického; Attendance: 10,500; Referee: Kurt Röthlisberger (Switzerland)

14 October 1992 W.C. 1994 Q	Belgium	1–0	Romania	Anderlecht, Belgium
20:00 UTC+2	Smidts 27'	Report		Stadium: Constant Vanden Stock Stadium; Attendance: 21,000; Referee: Pierluigi Pairetto (Italy)

18 November 1992 W.C. 1994 Q	Belgium	2–0	Wales	Anderlecht, Belgium
20:00 UTC+1	Staelens 53'; Degryse 58'	Report		Stadium: Constant Vanden Stock Stadium; Attendance: 21,000; Referee: Jan Damgaard (Denmark)

=== 1993 ===
13 February 1993 W.C. 1994 Q	Cyprus	0–3	Belgium	Nicosia, Cyprus
19:00 UTC+2		Report	Scifo 2', 5'; Albert 87'	Stadium: Makario Stadium; Attendance: 3,000; Referee: Piero Ceccarini (Italy)

31 March 1993 W.C. 1994 Q	Wales	2–0	Belgium	Cardiff, Wales
19:30 UTC+1	Giggs 18'; Rush 39'	Report		Stadium: Cardiff Arms Park; Attendance: 27,002; Referee: Aron Schmidhuber (Germany)

22 May 1993 W.C. 1994 Q	Belgium	3–0	Faroe Islands	Anderlecht, Belgium
19:45 UTC+2	Wilmots 33', 76'; Scifo 50' (pen.)	Report		Stadium: Constant Vanden Stock Stadium; Attendance: 20,641; Referee: Brendan Shorte (Ireland)

6 October 1993 Friendly	Belgium	2–1	Gabon	Anderlecht, Belgium
20:00 UTC+2	Wilmots 43', 88'	Report	Mackaya 38'	Stadium: Constant Vanden Stock Stadium; Attendance: 6,000; Referee: Friedrich Kaupe (Austria)

13 October 1993 W.C. 1994 Q	Romania	2–1	Belgium	Bucharest, Romania
20:00 UTC+3	Răducioiu 67' (pen.); Dumitrescu 85'	Report	Scifo 88' (pen.)	Stadium: Stadionul Steaua; Attendance: 28,000; Referee: Sándor Puhl (Hungary)

17 November 1993 W.C. 1994 Q	Belgium	0–0	Representation of Czechs and Slovaks (RCS)	Anderlecht, Belgium
20:15 UTC+1		Report		Stadium: Constant Vanden Stock Stadium; Attendance: 21,000; Referee: Hellmut Krug (Germany)

=== 1994 ===
16 February 1994 Friendly	Malta	1–0	Belgium	Ta' Qali, Malta
18:00 UTC+1	Busuttil 35'	Report		Stadium: Ta' Qali National Stadium; Attendance: 2,640; Referee: Angelo Amendolia (Italy)

4 June 1994 Friendly	Belgium	9–0	Zambia	Brussels, Belgium
19:00 UTC+2	Weber 9', 14', 58', 61', 88'; Degryse 28', 38', 63'; Nilis 56'	Report		Stadium: Heysel Stadium; Attendance: 5,000; Referee: Hugh Dallas (Scotland)

8 June 1994 Friendly	Belgium	3–1	Hungary	Brussels, Belgium
20:00 UTC+2	Weber 6'; Degryse 37'; Nilis 67'	Report	Jagodics 55'	Stadium: Heysel Stadium; Attendance: 16,000; Referee: Zbigniew Przesmycki (Poland)

19 June 1994 W.C. 1994 GS	Belgium	1–0	Morocco	Orlando, United States
12:30 UTC-4	Degryse 11'	Report		Stadium: Citrus Bowl; Attendance: 61,219; Referee: José Torres Cadena (Colombia)

25 June 1994 W.C. 1994 GS	Belgium	1–0	Netherlands	Orlando, United States
12:30 UTC-4	Albert 65'	Report		Stadium: Citrus Bowl; Attendance: 62,387; Referee: Renato Marsiglia (Brazil)

29 June 1994 W.C. 1994 GS	Belgium	0–1	Saudi Arabia	Washington, D.C., United States
12:30 UTC-4		Report	Al-Owairan 5'	Stadium: RFK Stadium; Attendance: 52,959; Referee: Hellmut Krug (Germany)

2 July 1994 W.C. 1994 1/8	Belgium	2–3	Germany	Chicago, United States
12:30 UTC-5	Grün 8'; Albert 90'	Report	Völler 6', 38'; Klinsmann 11'	Stadium: Soldier Field; Attendance: 60,246; Referee: Kurt Röthlisberger (Switzerland)

7 September 1994 EURO 1996 Q	Belgium	2–0	Armenia	Anderlecht, Belgium
20:15 UTC+2	Krbachyan 3' (o.g.); Degryse 73'	Report		Stadium: Constant Vanden Stock Stadium; Attendance: 6,140; Referee: John Ferry (Northern Ireland)

12 October 1994 EURO 1996 Q	Denmark	3–1	Belgium	Copenhagen, Denmark
20:15 UTC+2	Vilfort 35'; Jensen 72'; Strudal 86'	Report	Degryse 31'	Stadium: Parken Stadium; Attendance: 40,075; Referee: Pierluigi Pairetto (Italy)

16 November 1994 EURO 1996 Q	Belgium	1–1	Macedonia	Anderlecht, Belgium
20:15 UTC+1	Verheyen 31'	Report	Boškovski 51'	Stadium: Constant Vanden Stock Stadium; Attendance: 5,839; Referee: Sergei Khusainov (Russia)

17 December 1994 EURO 1996 Q	Belgium	1–4	Spain	Anderlecht, Belgium
20:30 UTC+1	Degryse 7'	Report	Hierro 29'; Donato 56'; Salinas 68'; Luis Enrique 90'	Stadium: Constant Vanden Stock Stadium; Attendance: 15,074; Referee: Ahmet Çakar (Turkey)

=== 1995 ===
29 March 1995 EURO 1996 Q	Spain	1–1	Belgium	Seville, Spain
21:30 UTC+2	Guerrero 24'	Report	Degryse 26'	Stadium: Estadio Ramón Sánchez Pizjuán; Attendance: 27,000; Referee: Rémi Harrel (France)

22 April 1995 Friendly	Belgium	1–0	United States	Brussels, Belgium
19:30 UTC+2	Schepens 44'	Report		Stadium: Edmond Machtens Stadium; Attendance: 12,369; Referee: Michel Zen-Ruffinen (Switzerland)

26 April 1995 EURO 1996 Q	Belgium	2–0	Cyprus	Anderlecht, Belgium
20:15 UTC+2	De Bilde 20'; Schepens 47'	Report		Stadium: Constant Vanden Stock Stadium; Attendance: 17,703; Referee: David Elleray (England)

7 June 1995 EURO 1996 Q	Macedonia	0–5	Belgium	Skopje, Macedonia
20:00 UTC+2		Report	Grün 15'; Scifo 18', 59'; Schepens 27'; Versavel 43'	Stadium: Gradski Stadion; Attendance: 532; Referee: Ryszard Wójcik (Poland)

23 August 1995 Friendly	Belgium	1–2	Germany	Brussels, Belgium
20:30 UTC+2	Goossens 17'	Report	Möller 6'; Bobič 84'	Stadium: King Baudouin Stadium; Attendance: 33,000; Referee: Mario van der Ende (Netherlands)

6 September 1995 EURO 1996 Q	Belgium	1–3	Denmark	Brussels, Belgium
20:15 UTC+2	Grün 26'	Report	M. Laudrup 20'; Beck 21'; Vilfort 85'	Stadium: King Baudouin Stadium; Attendance: 39,627; Referee: Vadim Zhuk (Belarus)

7 October 1995 EURO 1996 Q	Armenia	0–2	Belgium	Yerevan, Armenia
20:00 UTC+4		Report	Nilis 28', 39'	Stadium: Hrazdan Stadium; Attendance: 8,000; Referee: Mitko Mitrev (Bulgaria)

15 November 1995 EURO 1996 Q	Cyprus	1–1	Belgium	Limassol, Cyprus
19:00 UTC+2	Agathokleous 18'	Report	De Bilde 66'	Stadium: Tsirion Stadium; Attendance: 2,021; Referee: Graziano Cesari (Italy)

=== 1996 ===
27 March 1996 Friendly	Belgium	0–2	France	Brussels, Belgium
19:45 UTC+2		Report	Albert 65' (o.g.); Lamouchi 70'	Stadium: King Baudouin Stadium; Attendance: 24,417; Referee: Fritz Stuchlik (Austria)

24 April 1996 Friendly	Belgium	0–0	Russia	Brussels, Belgium
20:00 UTC+2		Report		Stadium: King Baudouin Stadium; Attendance: 14,539; Referee: Graziano Cesari (Italy)

29 May 1996 Friendly	Italy	2–2	Belgium	Cremona, Italy
20:45 UTC+2	Del Piero 25'; Chiesa 55'	Report	Claeys 5'; Carboni 11' (o.g.)	Stadium: Stadio Giovanni Zini; Attendance: 13,247; Referee: Kurt Zuppinger (Switzerland)

31 August 1996 W.C. 1998 Q	Belgium	2–1	Turkey	Brussels, Belgium
20:30 UTC+2	Degryse 11'; Oliveira 37'	Report	Yalçin 56'	Stadium: King Baudouin Stadium; Attendance: 33,024; Referee: David Elleray (England)

9 October 1996 W.C. 1998 Q	San Marino	0–3	Belgium	Serravalle, San Marino
20:30 UTC+2		Report	Verheyen 11'; Nilis 20', 49'	Stadium: Stadio Olimpico; Attendance: 1,353; Referee: Gevorg Hovhannisyan (Armenia)

14 December 1996 W.C. 1998 Q	Belgium	0–3	Netherlands	Brussels, Belgium
20:00 UTC+1		Report	Bergkamp 24'; Seedorf 29'; Jonk 89' (pen.)	Stadium: King Baudouin Stadium; Attendance: 36,953; Referee: Pierluigi Pairetto (Italy)

=== 1997 ===
11 February 1997 Friendly	Northern Ireland	3–0	Belgium	Belfast, Northern Ireland
19:00 UTC±0	Quinn 14'; Magilton 62' (pen.); Mulryne 88'	Report		Stadium: Windsor Park; Attendance: 7,126; Referee: John Rowbotham (Scotland)

29 March 1997 W.C. 1998 Q	Wales	1–2	Belgium	Cardiff, Wales
19:00 UTC±0	Speed 60'	Report	Crasson 24'; Staelens 45'	Stadium: Cardiff Arms Park; Attendance: 14,650; Referee: Christer Fällström (Sweden)

30 April 1997 W.C. 1998 Q	Turkey	1–3	Belgium	Istanbul, Turkey
20:30 UTC+3	Derelioğlu 35'	Report	Oliveira 14', 32', 45'	Stadium: Ali Sami Yen Stadium; Attendance: 21,350; Referee: Bernd Heynemann (Germany)

7 June 1997 W.C. 1998 Q	Belgium	6–0	San Marino	Brussels, Belgium
19:45 UTC+2	Staelens 15', 84'; Van Meir 26'; E. Mpenza 27', 45'; Oliveira 33'	Report		Stadium: King Baudouin Stadium; Attendance: 24,000; Referee: Pavlin Jirku (Czech Republic)

6 September 1997 W.C. 1998 Q	Netherlands	3–1	Belgium	Rotterdam, Netherlands
20:00 UTC+2	Stam 32'; Kluivert 54'; Bergkamp 84'	Report	Staelens 67' (pen.)	Stadium: De Kuip; Attendance: 48,000; Referee: Kim Milton Nielsen (Denmark)

11 October 1997 W.C. 1998 Q	Belgium	3–2	Wales	Brussels, Belgium
20:00 UTC+2	Staelens 4' (pen.); Claessens 32'; Wilmots 39'	Report	Pembridge 53' (pen.); Giggs 66'	Stadium: King Baudouin Stadium; Attendance: 18,233; Referee: Vítor Melo Pereira (Portugal)

29 October 1997 W.C. 1998 Q PO	Republic of Ireland	1–1	Belgium	Dublin, Ireland
19:30 UTC±0	Irwin 7'	Report	Nilis 29'	Stadium: Lansdowne Road; Attendance: 32,305; Referee: László Vagner (Hungary)

15 November 1997 W.C. 1998 Q PO	Belgium	2–1 (3–2 agg.)	Republic of Ireland	Brussels, Belgium
20:00 UTC+1	Oliveira 25'; Nilis 70'	Report	Houghton 58'	Stadium: King Baudouin Stadium; Attendance: 35,320; Referee: Günter Benkö (Austria)

=== 1998 ===
25 February 1998 Friendly	Belgium	2–0	United States	Brussels, Belgium
19:45 UTC+2	Van Kerckhoven 23', 59'	Report		Stadium: King Baudouin Stadium; Attendance: 15,894; Referee: Philippe Kart (France)

25 March 1998 Friendly	Belgium	2–2	Norway	Brussels, Belgium
20:00 UTC+1	Van der Elst 8'; Wilmots 65'	Report	Riseth 11'; Solskjær 70'	Stadium: King Baudouin Stadium; Attendance: 13,371; Referee: Hans-Jürgen Weber (Germany)

22 April 1998 Friendly	Belgium	1–1	Romania	Brussels, Belgium
20:00 UTC+2	Nilis 78'	Report	Moldovan 44'	Stadium: King Baudouin Stadium; Attendance: 18,212; Referee: Morgan Norman (Sweden)

27 May 1998 King Hassan II Tournament	Belgium	0–1	France	Casablanca, Morocco
20:30 UTC+1		Report	Zidane 64'	Stadium: Stade Mohamed V Attendance: 80,000; Referee: Mohamed Guezzaz (Morocco)

29 May 1998 King Hassan II Tournament	Belgium	0–0 (4–3 p)	England	Casablanca, Morocco
18:30 UTC+1		Report		Stadium: Stade Mohamed V Attendance: 25,000; Referee: Abderrahim El Arjoun (Morocco)
	Penalties
	Van Meir (penalty scored); Borkelmans (penalty scored); Mpenza (penalty scored); Scifo (penalty missed); Vande Walle (penalty scored)		(penalty missed) Lee; (penalty scored) Owen; (penalty scored) Beckham; (penalty scored) Merson; (penalty missed) Ferdinand

3 June 1998 Friendly	Belgium	2–0	Colombia	Brussels, Belgium
20:15 UTC+2	Boffin 18'; Wilmots 32'	Report		Stadium: King Baudouin Stadium; Attendance: 9,253; Referee: Stefan Ormandzhiev (Bulgaria)

6 June 1998 Friendly	Belgium	1–0	Paraguay	Brussels, Belgium
20:15 UTC+2	Scifo 54'	Report		Stadium: King Baudouin Stadium; Attendance: 30,610; Referee: Kenny Clark (Scotland)

13 June 1998 W.C. 1998 GS	Belgium	0–0	Netherlands	Saint-Denis, France
21:00 UTC+2		Report		Stadium: Stade de France; Attendance: 77,000; Referee: Pierluigi Collina (Italy)

20 June 1998 W.C. 1998 GS	Mexico	2–2	Belgium	Bordeaux, France
17:30 UTC+2	García Aspe 55' (pen.); Blanco 62'	Report	Wilmots 42', 47'	Stadium: Parc Lescure; Attendance: 31,800; Referee: Hugh Dallas (Scotland)

25 June 1998 W.C. 1998 GS	South Korea	1–1	Belgium	Paris, France
16:00 UTC+2	Yoo Sang-chul 72'	Report	Nilis 7'	Stadium: Parc des Princes; Attendance: 45,500; Referee: Márcio Rezende de Freitas (Brazil)

18 November 1998 Friendly	Luxembourg	0–0	Belgium	Luxembourg City, Luxembourg
20:00 UTC+1		Report		Stadium: Stade Josy Barthel; Attendance: 3,149; Referee: Stéphane Bré (France)

=== 1999 ===
3 February 1999 Cyprus Tournament	Cyprus	0–1	Belgium	Limassol, Cyprus
21:00 UTC+2		Report	Mpenza 76'	Stadium: Tsirion Athletic Center; Attendance: 600; Referee: Loizos Loizou (Cyprus)

5 February 1999 Cyprus Tournament	Belgium	0–1	Greece	Larnaca, Cyprus
21:00 UTC+2		Report	Giannakopoulos 90+4'	Stadium: GSZ Stadium; Attendance: 3,000; Referee: Yiannakis Kiprianidis (Cyprus)

9 February 1999 Friendly	Belgium	0–1	Czech Republic	Brussels, Belgium
20:00 UTC+1		Report	Koller 73'	Stadium: King Baudouin Stadium; Attendance: 14,700; Referee: Jan Wegereef (Netherlands)

27 March 1999 Friendly	Belgium	0–1	Bulgaria	Brussels, Belgium
20:00 UTC+1		Report	Yovov 10'	Stadium: King Baudouin Stadium; Attendance: 23,412; Referee: Domenico Messina (Italy)

30 March 1999 Friendly	Belgium	0–1	Egypt	Liège, Belgium
20:45 UTC+2		Report	Emam 13'	Stadium: Stade Maurice Dufrasne; Attendance: 18,612; Referee: Dominique Tavel (Switzerland)

28 April 1999 Friendly	Romania	1–0	Belgium	Bucharest, Romania
20:30 UTC+3	Ganea 48'	Report		Stadium: Stadionul Steaua; Attendance: 7,000; Referee: Georgios Fassolis (Greece)

30 May 1999 Kirin Cup	Peru	1–1	Belgium	Kyoto, Japan
13:30 UTC+9	Maestri 6'	Report	Tanghe 27'	Stadium: Nishikyogoku Athletic Stadium; Attendance: 9,262; Referee: Naotsugu Fuse (Japan)

3 June 1999 Kirin Cup	Japan	0–0	Belgium	Tokyo, Japan
19:00 UTC+9		Report		Stadium: National Stadium; Attendance: 54,685; Referee: Kim Tae-young (South Korea)

5 June 1999 Friendly	South Korea	1–2	Belgium	Seoul, South Korea
20:00 UTC+9	Ko Jong-soo 90+1' (pen.)	Report	Martens 23', 31'	Stadium: Olympic Stadium; Attendance: 58,000; Referee: Masayoshi Okada (Japan)

18 August 1999 Friendly	Belgium	3–4	Finland	Bruges, Belgium
19:45 UTC+2	Martens 42'; Wilmots 60'; Mpenza 70'	Report	Wiss 32'; Johansson 45', 54'; Lehkosuo 63'	Stadium: Jan Breydel Stadium; Attendance: 8,000; Referee: Alain Hamer (Luxembourg)

4 September 1999 Friendly	Netherlands	5–5	Belgium	Rotterdam, Netherlands
20:30 UTC+2	Davids 37', 42'; Kluivert 45', 58', 69'	Report	Strupar 9', 30'; Goor 50'; Wilmots 52'; Mpenza 77'	Stadium: De Kuip; Attendance: 25,000; Referee: Urs Meier (Switzerland)

7 September 1999 Friendly	Belgium	4–0	Morocco	Liège, Belgium
20:45 UTC+2	Staelens 9' (pen.); Walem 18'; Mpenza 20'; Strupar 87'	Report		Stadium: Stade Maurice Dufrasne; Attendance: 15,000; Referee: Georgios Fassolis (Greece)

10 October 1999 Friendly	England	2–1	Belgium	Sunderland, England
15:00 UTC+1	Shearer 6'; Redknapp 66'	Report	Strupar 14'	Stadium: Stadium of Light; Attendance: 40,987; Referee: Anders Frisk (Sweden)

13 November 1999 Friendly	Italy	1–3	Belgium	Lecce, Italy
20:45 UTC+1	Vanoli 26'	Report	De Bilde 7'; Wilmots 69'; Goor 86'	Stadium: Stadio Via del Mare; Attendance: 9,550; Referee: Edgar Steinborn (Germany)
