= 1998 FIFA World Cup qualification (UEFA) =

Tournament details
- Dates: 24 April 1996 – 15 November 1997
- Teams: 49 (from 1 confederation)

Tournament statistics
- Matches played: 228
- Goals scored: 667 (2.93 per match)
- Attendance: 4,794,512 (21,029 per match)
- Top scorer(s): (Federal Republic of Yugoslavia) Predrag Mijatović (14 goals)

Listed below are the dates and results for the 1998 FIFA World Cup qualification rounds for the European zone (UEFA).

A total of 50 UEFA teams entered the competition; Andorra, which joined FIFA and UEFA in November 1996 while the qualifiers were underway, could not enter. The European zone was allocated 15 places (out of 32) in the final tournament. France, the hosts, qualified automatically, leaving 14 spots open for competition between 49 teams.

The 49 teams were divided into nine groups, four groups of six teams and five groups of five teams. The teams would play against each other on a home-and-away basis. The group winners would qualify. The runners-up would be ranked according to their records against the 1st, 3rd and 4th-placed team in their groups, and the team with the best record would also qualify. The other runners-up would advance to the UEFA Play-offs.

In the play-offs, the 8 teams were paired up to play knockout matches on a home-and-away basis. The winners would qualify.

== First round ==
First round was group play. The draw was made on 12 December 1995, and was based on the November 1995 FIFA World Rankings.

=== Seeding ===
The teams were divided into five pools as shown in table below (November 1995 rankings shown in brackets).

Pot 1
Team	Rank
Germany	2
Spain	3
Italy	4
Russia	5
Norway	6
Denmark	8
Netherlands	10
Sweden	11
Romania	12

Pot 2
Team	Rank
Bulgaria	14
Switzerland	15
Portugal	16
Czech Republic	18
England	20
Republic of Ireland	21
Scotland	25
Belgium	26
Greece	29

Pot 3
Team	Rank
Turkey	31
Poland	33
Slovakia	35
Austria	38
Croatia	39
Israel	40
Finland	41
Lithuania	45
Northern Ireland	46

Pot 4
Team	Rank
Iceland	48
Latvia	54
Wales	57
Hungary	60
Cyprus	70
Ukraine	71
Slovenia	75
Georgia	77
FR Yugoslavia	80

Pot 5
Team	Rank
Albania	87
Belarus	88
Malta	89
Macedonia	90
Luxembourg	98
Moldova	107
Armenia	112
Faroe Islands	116
Estonia	126
Azerbaijan	136
San Marino	142
Liechtenstein	151
Bosnia and Herzegovina	NR

=== Summary ===
Winner of each group and the best runner-up qualified directly for the 1998 FIFA World Cup
The remaining runners-up advanced to the second round (play-offs)
Other teams were eliminated after the first round

Group 1	Group 2	Group 3	Group 4	Group 5	Group 6	Group 7	Group 8	Group 9
Denmark	England	Norway	Austria	Bulgaria	Spain	Netherlands	Romania	Germany
Croatia	Italy	Hungary	Scotland	Russia	FR Yugoslavia	Belgium	Republic of Ireland	Ukraine
Greece Bosnia and Herzegovina Slovenia	Poland Georgia Moldova	Finland Switzerland Azerbaijan	Sweden Latvia Estonia Belarus	Israel Cyprus Luxembourg	Czech Republic Slovakia Faroe Islands Malta	Turkey Wales San Marino	Lithuania Macedonia Iceland Liechtenstein	Portugal Armenia Northern Ireland Albania

=== Group 1 ===
Pos	Team	Pld	W	D	L	GF	GA	GD	Pts	Qualification	Denmark national football team	Croatia national football team	Greece national football team	Bosnia and Herzegovina national football team	Slovenia national football team
1	Denmark	8	5	2	1	14	6	+8	17	Qualification to 1998 FIFA World Cup	—	3–1	2–1	2–0	4–0
2	Croatia	8	4	3	1	17	12	+5	15	Advance to second round	1–1	—	1–1	3–2	3–3
3	Greece	8	4	2	2	11	4	+7	14		0–0	0–1	—	3–0	2–0
4	Bosnia and Herzegovina	8	3	0	5	9	14	−5	9		3–0	1–4	0–1	—	1–0
5	Slovenia	8	0	1	7	5	20	−15	1		0–2	1–3	0–3	1–2	—

=== Group 2 ===
Pos	Team	Pld	W	D	L	GF	GA	GD	Pts	Qualification	England national football team	Italy national football team	Poland national football team	Georgia national football team	Moldova national football team
1	England	8	6	1	1	15	2	+13	19	Qualification to 1998 FIFA World Cup	—	0–1	2–1	2–0	4–0
2	Italy	8	5	3	0	11	1	+10	18	Advance to second round	0–0	—	3–0	1–0	3–0
3	Poland	8	3	1	4	10	12	−2	10		0–2	0–0	—	4–1	2–1
4	Georgia	8	3	1	4	7	9	−2	10		0–2	0–0	3–0	—	2–0
5	Moldova	8	0	0	8	2	21	−19	0		0–3	1–3	0–3	0–1	—

=== Group 3 ===
Pos	Team	Pld	W	D	L	GF	GA	GD	Pts	Qualification	Norway national football team	Hungary national football team	Finland national football team	Switzerland national football team	Azerbaijan national football team
1	Norway	8	6	2	0	21	2	+19	20	Qualification to 1998 FIFA World Cup	—	3–0	1–1	5–0	5–0
2	Hungary	8	3	3	2	10	8	+2	12	Advance to second round	1–1	—	1–0	1–1	3–1
3	Finland	8	3	2	3	11	12	−1	11		0–4	1–1	—	2–3	3–0
4	Switzerland	8	3	1	4	11	12	−1	10		0–1	1–0	1–2	—	5–0
5	Azerbaijan	8	1	0	7	3	22	−19	3		0–1	0–3	1–2	1–0	—

=== Group 4 ===
Pos	Team	Pld	W	D	L	GF	GA	GD	Pts	Qualification	Austria national football team	Scotland national football team	Sweden men's national football team	Latvia national football team	Estonia national football team	Belarus national football team
1	Austria	10	8	1	1	17	4	+13	25	Qualification to 1998 FIFA World Cup	—	0–0	1–0	2–1	2–0	4–0
2	Scotland	10	7	2	1	15	3	+12	23	Qualification to 1998 FIFA World Cup	2–0	—	1–0	2–0	2–0	4–1
3	Sweden	10	7	0	3	16	9	+7	21		0–1	2–1	—	1–0	1–0	5–1
4	Latvia	10	3	1	6	10	14	−4	10		1–3	0–2	1–2	—	1–0	2–0
5	Estonia	10	1	1	8	4	16	−12	4		0–3	0–0	2–3	1–3	—	1–0
6	Belarus	10	1	1	8	5	21	−16	4		0–1	0–1	1–2	1–1	1–0	—

=== Group 5 ===
Pos	Team	Pld	W	D	L	GF	GA	GD	Pts	Qualification	Bulgaria national football team	Russia national football team	Israel national football team	Cyprus national football team	Luxembourg national football team
1	Bulgaria	8	6	0	2	18	9	+9	18	Qualification to 1998 FIFA World Cup	—	1–0	1–0	4–1	4–0
2	Russia	8	5	2	1	19	5	+14	17	Advance to second round	4–2	—	2–0	4–0	3–0
3	Israel	8	4	1	3	9	7	+2	13		2–1	1–1	—	2–0	1–0
4	Cyprus	8	3	1	4	10	15	−5	10		1–3	1–1	2–0	—	2–0
5	Luxembourg	8	0	0	8	2	22	−20	0		1–2	0–4	0–3	1–3	—

=== Group 6 ===
Pos	Team	Pld	W	D	L	GF	GA	GD	Pts	Qualification	Spain national football team	Serbia and Montenegro national football team	Czech Republic national football team	Slovakia national football team	Faroe Islands national football team	Malta national football team
1	Spain	10	8	2	0	26	6	+20	26	Qualification to 1998 FIFA World Cup	—	2–0	1–0	4–1	3–1	4–0
2	FR Yugoslavia	10	7	2	1	29	7	+22	23	Advance to second round	1–1	—	1–0	2–0	3–1	6–0
3	Czech Republic	10	5	1	4	16	6	+10	16		0–0	1–2	—	3–0	2–0	6–0
4	Slovakia	10	5	1	4	18	14	+4	16		1–2	1–1	2–1	—	3–0	6–0
5	Faroe Islands	10	2	0	8	10	31	−21	6		2–6	1–8	0–2	1–2	—	2–1
6	Malta	10	0	0	10	2	37	−35	0		0–3	0–5	0–1	0–2	1–2	—

=== Group 7 ===
Pos	Team	Pld	W	D	L	GF	GA	GD	Pts	Qualification	Netherlands national football team	Belgium national football team	Turkey national football team	Wales national football team	San Marino national football team
1	Netherlands	8	6	1	1	26	4	+22	19	Qualification to 1998 FIFA World Cup	—	3–1	0–0	7–1	4–0
2	Belgium	8	6	0	2	20	11	+9	18	Advance to second round	0–3	—	2–1	3–2	6–0
3	Turkey	8	4	2	2	21	9	+12	14		1–0	1–3	—	6–4	7–0
4	Wales	8	2	1	5	20	21	−1	7		1–3	1–2	0–0	—	6–0
5	San Marino	8	0	0	8	0	42	−42	0		0–6	0–3	0–5	0–5	—

=== Group 8 ===
Pos	Team	Pld	W	D	L	GF	GA	GD	Pts	Qualification	Romania national football team	Republic of Ireland national football team	Lithuania national football team	North Macedonia national football team	Iceland national football team	Liechtenstein national football team
1	Romania	10	9	1	0	37	4	+33	28	Qualification to 1998 FIFA World Cup	—	1–0	3–0	4–2	4–0	8–0
2	Republic of Ireland	10	5	3	2	22	8	+14	18	Advance to second round	1–1	—	0–0	3–0	0–0	5–0
3	Lithuania	10	5	2	3	11	8	+3	17		0–1	1–2	—	2–0	2–0	2–1
4	Macedonia	10	4	1	5	22	18	+4	13		0–3	3–2	1–2	—	1–0	3–0
5	Iceland	10	2	3	5	11	16	−5	9		0–4	2–4	0–0	1–1	—	4–0
6	Liechtenstein	10	0	0	10	3	52	−49	0		1–8	0–5	0–2	1–11	0–4	—

=== Group 9 ===
Pos	Team	Pld	W	D	L	GF	GA	GD	Pts	Qualification	Germany national football team	Ukraine national football team	Portugal national football team	Armenia national football team	Northern Ireland national football team	Albania national football team
1	Germany	10	6	4	0	23	9	+14	22	Qualification to 1998 FIFA World Cup	—	2–0	1–1	4–0	1–1	4–3
2	Ukraine	10	6	2	2	10	6	+4	20	Advance to second round	0–0	—	2–1	1–1	2–1	1–0
3	Portugal	10	5	4	1	12	4	+8	19		0–0	1–0	—	3–1	1–0	2–0
4	Armenia	10	1	5	4	8	17	−9	8		1–5	0–2	0–0	—	0–0	3–0
5	Northern Ireland	10	1	4	5	6	10	−4	7		1–3	0–1	0–0	1–1	—	2–0
6	Albania	10	1	1	8	7	20	−13	4		2–3	0–1	0–3	1–1	1–0	—

=== Ranking of second-placed teams ===
As some groups had six teams and others had five, the matches vs the fifth and sixth place teams were discarded for the purposes of the ranking, though discarding results against the sixth placed team would have been sufficient.

Pos	Grp	Team	Pld	W	D	L	GF	GA	GD	Pts	Qualification
1	4	Scotland	6	4	1	1	8	2	+6	13	Qualification to 1998 FIFA World Cup
2	2	Italy	6	3	3	0	5	0	+5	12	Advance to second round (play-offs)
3	7	Belgium	6	4	0	2	11	11	0	12	Advance to second round (play-offs)
4	5	Russia	6	3	2	1	12	5	+7	11	Advance to second round (play-offs)
5	1	Croatia	6	3	2	1	11	8	+3	11	Advance to second round (play-offs)
6	6	FR Yugoslavia	6	3	2	1	7	5	+2	11	Advance to second round (play-offs)
7	8	Republic of Ireland	6	2	2	2	8	6	+2	8	Advance to second round (play-offs)
8	9	Ukraine	6	2	2	2	5	5	0	8	Advance to second round (play-offs)
9	3	Hungary	6	1	3	2	4	7	−3	6	Advance to second round (play-offs)

== Second round ==
Team 1	Agg.	Team 2	1st leg	2nd leg
Croatia	3–1	Ukraine	2–0	1–1
Russia	1–2	Italy	1–1	0–1
Republic of Ireland	2–3	Belgium	1–1	1–2
Hungary	1–12	FR Yugoslavia	1–7	0–5

== Qualified teams ==
The following 15 teams from UEFA qualified for the final tournament.

Team	Qualified as	Qualified on	Previous appearances in FIFA World Cup^{1}
France	Hosts	2 July 1992	9 (1930, 1934, 1938, 1954, 1958, 1966, 1978, 1982, 1986)
Denmark	Group 1 winners	11 October 1997	1 (1986)
England	Group 2 winners	11 October 1997	9 (1950, 1954, 1958, 1962, **1966**, 1970, 1982, 1986, 1990)
Norway	Group 3 winners	6 September 1997	2 (1938, 1994)
Austria	Group 4 winners	11 October 1997	6 (1934, 1954, 1958, 1978, 1982, 1990)
Bulgaria	Group 5 winners	10 September 1997	6 (1962, 1966, 1970, 1974, 1986, 1994)
Spain	Group 6 winners	11 October 1997	9 (1934, 1950, 1962, 1966, 1978, 1982, 1986, 1990, 1994)
Netherlands	Group 7 winners	11 October 1997	6 (1934, 1938, 1974, 1978, 1990, 1994)
Romania	Group 8 winners	18 August 1997	6 (1930, 1934, 1938, 1970, 1990, 1994)
Germany	Group 9 winners	11 October 1997	13 (1934, 1938, **1954**^{2}, 1958^{2}, 1962^{2}, 1966^{2}, 1970^{2}, **1974**^{2}, 1978^{2}, 1982^{2}, 1986^{2}, **1990**^{2}, 1994)
Scotland	Best runners-up	11 October 1997	7 (1954, 1958, 1974, 1978, 1982, 1986, 1990)
Croatia	Play-off winners	15 November 1997	0 (debut)
Italy	Play-off winners	15 November 1997	13 (**1934**, **1938**, 1950, 1954, 1962, 1966, 1970, 1974, 1978, **1982**, 1986, 1990, 1994)
Belgium	Play-off winners	15 November 1997	9 (1930, 1934, 1938, 1954, 1970, 1982, 1986, 1990, 1994)
FR Yugoslavia	Play-off winners	15 November 1997	8 (1930^{3}, 1950^{3}, 1954^{3}, 1958^{3}, 1962^{3}, 1974^{3}, 1982^{3}, 1990^{3})

^{1} Bold indicates champions for that year. Italic indicates hosts for that year.
^{2} Competed as West Germany. A separate team for East Germany also participated in qualifications during this time, having only competed in 1974.
^{3} Competed as Yugoslavia.

== Top goalscorers ==
There were 667 goals scored in 228 matches, for an average of 2.93 goals per match.

14 goals

- (Federal Republic of Yugoslavia) Predrag Mijatović

9 goals

- (Federal Republic of Yugoslavia) Savo Milošević

8 goals

- (Romania) Gheorghe Popescu
- (Turkey) Hakan Şükür

7 goals

- (Austria) Toni Polster
- (Republic of Ireland) Tony Cascarino
- (Netherlands) Dennis Bergkamp
- (Sweden) Kennet Andersson
- (Federal Republic of Yugoslavia) Dejan Savićević

6 goals

- (Belgium) Luís Oliveira
- (Bulgaria) Emil Kostadinov
- (Germany) Oliver Bierhoff
- (Romania) Viorel Moldovan
- (Scotland) Kevin Gallacher

Below are full goalscorer lists for all groups and the play-offs:

- Group 1
- Group 2
- Group 3
- Group 4
- Group 5
- Group 6
- Group 7
- Group 8
- Group 9
- Play-offs

== Notes ==
- To date, this was the last time that Portugal failed to qualify for a FIFA World Cup, and the only time Italy qualified for a FIFA World Cup through the playoffs (having lost in 2018, 2022 and 2026).
