= List of Turkey national football team hat-tricks =

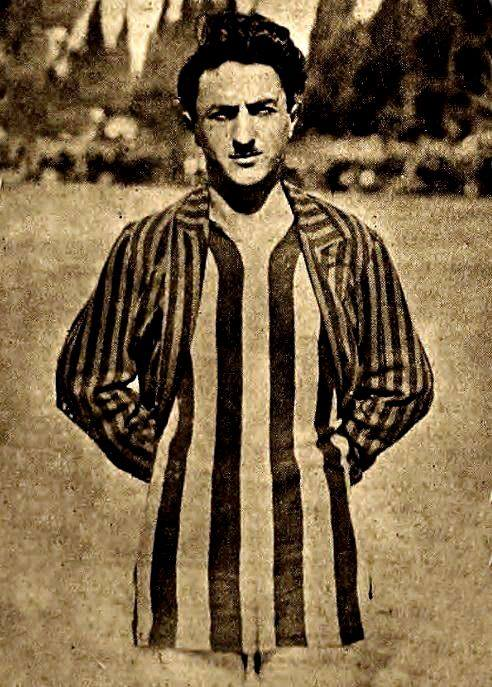
Zeki Rıza Sporel was the first player to score a hat-trick for the Turkey national team in 1924

This page is a list of the hat-tricks scored for the Turkey national football team. Since Turkey's first international association football match in 1923 against Romania, there have been 19 occasions when a Turkish player has scored three or more goals (a hat-trick) in a game. The first hat-trick was scored by Zeki Rıza Sporel against Finland in 1924. The record for the most goals scored in an international game by a Turkish player is four, which has been achieved on four occasions: by Zeki Rıza Sporel against Finland in a friendly match, by Oktay Derelioğlu against San Marino at the 1998 FIFA World Cup qualification, and the other two by Hakan Şükür, the first against Wales at the 1998 FIFA World Cup qualification and the second against Moldova at the UEFA Euro 2008 qualifying.

== Hat-tricks for Turkey ==
Ranks	Date	Goals	Player	Opponent	Venue	Competition	Result^{[a]}	Ref
1	17 June 1924	4	Zeki Rıza Sporel	Finland	Töölön Pallokenttä, Helsinki	Friendly	4–2	
2	22 June 1924	3	Zeki Rıza Sporel	Latvia	LSB Stadions, Riga	Friendly	3–1	
3	20 November 1949	3	Fahrettin Cansever	Syria	19 Mayıs Stadium, Ankara	1950 FIFA World Cup qualification	7–0	
4	28 May 1950	3	Reha Eken	Iran	Mithatpaşa Stadium, Istanbul	Friendly	6–1	
5	20 June 1954	3	Burhan Sargın	South Korea	Charmilles Stadium, Geneva	1954 FIFA World Cup	7–0	
6	5 April 1957	3	Lefter Küçükandonyadis	Egypt	El Zamalek Stadium, Cairo	1953–58 Mediterranean Cup	4–0	
7	10 October 1962	3	Metin Oktay	Ethiopia	19 Mayıs Stadium, Ankara	Friendly	3–0	
8	18 April 1973	3	Cemil Turan	Bulgaria	Atatürk Stadium, İzmir	1973-76 Balkan Cup	5–2	
9	31 October 1976	3	Cemil Turan	Malta	Atatürk Stadium, İzmir	1978 FIFA World Cup qualification	4–0	
10	10 November 1996	4	Oktay Derelioğlu	San Marino	Ali Sami Yen Stadium, Istanbul	1998 FIFA World Cup qualification	7–0	
11	20 August 1997	4	Hakan Şükür	Wales	Ali Sami Yen Stadium, Istanbul	1998 FIFA World Cup qualification	6–4	
12	4 September 1999	3	Arif Erdem	Northern Ireland	Windsor Park, Belfast	UEFA Euro 2000 qualifying	3–0	
13	6 June 2001	3	Alpay Özalan	Macedonia	Atatürk Stadium, Bursa	2002 FIFA World Cup qualification	3–3	
14	16 November 2005	3	Tuncay Şanlı	Switzerland	Şükrü Saracoğlu Stadium, Istanbul	2006 FIFA World Cup qualification	4–2	
15	11 October 2006	4	Hakan Şükür	Moldova	Commerzbank-Arena, Frankfurt	UEFA Euro 2008 qualifying	5–0	
16	19 November 2008	3	Tuncay Şanlı	Austria	Ernst-Happel-Stadion, Wien	Friendly	4–2	
17	6 September 2013	3	Umut Bulut	Andorra	Kadir Has Stadium, Kayseri	2014 FIFA World Cup qualification	5–0	
18	24 March 2021	3	Burak Yılmaz	Netherlands	Atatürk Olympic Stadium, Istanbul	2022 FIFA World Cup qualification	4–2	
19	9 September 2024	3	Kerem Aktürkoğlu	Iceland	Gürsel Aksel Stadium, İzmir	2024–25 UEFA Nations League B	3–1	

== Hat-tricks conceded by Turkey ==
Ranks	Date	Goals	Player	Opponent	Venue	Competition	Result^{[a]}	Ref
1	12 September 1926	3	Zygmunt Steuermann	Poland	Polish Army Stadium, Lemberg	Friendly	1–6	
2	28 May 1928	3	Mahmoud Mokhtar El-Tetsh	Egypt	Olympic Stadium, Amsterdam	1928 Summer Olympics	1–7	
3	27 September 1931	3	Arsen Panchev	Bulgaria	Vasil Levski Stadium, Sofia	1931 Balkan Cup	1–5	
4	28 October 1950	3	Yehoshua Glazer	Israel	Maccabiah Stadium, Tel Aviv	Friendly	1–5	
5	23 June 1954	3	Max Morlock	West Germany	Hardturm Stadium, Zürich	1954 FIFA World Cup	2–7	
6	17 October 1954	3	Stjepan Bobek	Yugoslavia	Koševo Stadium, Sarajevo	Friendly	1–5	
7	6 November 1957	3	László Kubala	Spain	Santiago Bernabéu, Madrid	Friendly	0–3	
8	2 December 1962	4	Alberto Orlando	Italy	Stadio Comunale, Bologna	1964 European Nations' Cup qualifying	0–6	
9	28 September 1963	3	Uwe Seeler	West Germany	Waldstadion, Frankfurt	Friendly	0–3	
10	24 January 1965	3	Eusébio	Portugal	Estádio Nacional, Lisbon	1966 FIFA World Cup qualification	1–5	
11	9 May 1965	3	Spiro Debarski	Bulgaria	Slavia Stadium, Sofia	Friendly	1–4	
12	28 November 1967	3	Abdul Jabbar	Pakistan	Dacca Stadium, Dhaka	1967 RCD Cup	7–4	
13	24 April 1968	3	Eugeniusz Faber	Poland	Silesian Stadium, Chorzów	Friendly	0–8	
14	24 April 1968	3	Włodzimierz Lubański	Poland	Silesian Stadium, Chorzów	Friendly	0–8	
15	21 September 1971	3	Włodzimierz Lubański	Poland	Stadion Wisła, Kraków	UEFA Euro 1972 qualifying	1–5	
16	12 April 1972	3	Atanas Mihaylov	Bulgaria	Vasil Levski Stadium, Sofia	Friendly	2–4	
17	29 October 1975	4	Don Givens	Republic of Ireland	Dalymount Park, Dublin	UEFA Euro 1976 qualifying	0–4	
18	14 November 1984	3	Bryan Robson	England	İnönü Stadium, Istanbul	1986 FIFA World Cup qualification	0–8	
19	16 October 1985	3	Gary Lineker	England	Wembley Stadium, London	1986 FIFA World Cup qualification	0–5	
20	29 October 1986	3	Zlatko Vujović	Yugoslavia	Stadion Poljud, Split	UEFA Euro 1988 qualifying	0–4	
21	14 October 1987	3	Gary Lineker	England	Wembley Stadium, London	UEFA Euro 1988 qualifying	0–8	
22	17 October 1990	3	John Aldridge	Republic of Ireland	Lansdowne Road, Dublin	UEFA Euro 1992 qualifying	0–5	
23	17 July 1991	4	Arnór Guðjohnsen	Iceland	Laugardalsvöllur, Reykjavík	Friendly	1–5	
24	30 April 1997	3	Luís Oliveira	Belgium	Ali Sami Yen Stadium, Istanbul	1998 FIFA World Cup qualification	1–3	
25	7 September 2021	3	Memphis Depay	Netherlands	Johan Cruyff Arena, Amsterdam	2022 FIFA World Cup qualification	1–6	
26	26 March 2024	3	Michael Gregoritsch	Austria	Ernst-Happel-Stadion, Vienna	Friendly	1–6	
27	7 September 2025	3	Mikel Merino	Spain	Konya Metropolitan Municipality Stadium, Konya	2026 FIFA World Cup qualification	0–6	
