= 1998 FIFA World Cup qualification – UEFA Group 9 =

Group 9 consisted of six of the 50 teams entered into the European zone: (Note: Only 49 of the entered teams actually competed in the qualification tournament: France qualified for the World Cup automatically as host.) Albania, Armenia, Germany, Northern Ireland, Portugal, and Ukraine. These six teams competed on a home-and-away basis for two of the 15 spots in the final tournament allocated to the European zone, with the group's winner and runner-up claiming those spots.

== Standings ==
Pos	Team	Pld	W	D	L	GF	GA	GD	Pts	Qualification	Germany national football team	Ukraine national football team	Portugal national football team	Armenia national football team	Northern Ireland national football team	Albania national football team
1	Germany	10	6	4	0	23	9	+14	22	Qualification to 1998 FIFA World Cup	—	2–0	1–1	4–0	1–1	4–3
2	Ukraine	10	6	2	2	10	6	+4	20	Advance to second round	0–0	—	2–1	1–1	2–1	1–0
3	Portugal	10	5	4	1	12	4	+8	19		0–0	1–0	—	3–1	1–0	2–0
4	Armenia	10	1	5	4	8	17	−9	8		1–5	0–2	0–0	—	0–0	3–0
5	Northern Ireland	10	1	4	5	6	10	−4	7		1–3	0–1	0–0	1–1	—	2–0
6	Albania	10	1	1	8	7	20	−13	4		2–3	0–1	0–3	1–1	1–0	—

== Matches ==
31 August 1996
15:00 UTC+1

Northern Ireland	0–1	Ukraine
	Report	Rebrov 79'

Windsor Park, Belfast
Attendance: 9,358
Referee: Alain Sars (France)
31 August 1996
20:30 UTC+4

Armenia	0–0	Portugal
	Report

Hrazdan Stadium, Yerevan
Attendance: 6,015
Referee: Karol Ihring (Slovakia)

5 October 1996
20:00 UTC+3

Ukraine	2–1	Portugal
Popov 4'; Maksymov 88'	Report	João V. Pinto 83'

Olimpiysky, Kyiv
Attendance: 51,385
Referee: Kim Milton Nielsen (Denmark)
5 October 1996
15:00 UTC+1

Northern Ireland	1–1	Armenia
Lennon 29'	Report	Assadourian 8'

Windsor Park, Belfast
Attendance: 8,357
Referee: Krsto Danilovski (Macedonia)

9 October 1996
20:00 UTC+4

Armenia	1–5	Germany
Mikaelyan 85'	Report	Häßler 20', 39'; Klinsmann 26'; Bobić 69'; Kuntz 81'

Hrazdan Stadium, Yerevan
Attendance: 42,000
Referee: Pierluigi Collina (Italy)
9 October 1996
20:00 UTC+2

Albania	0–3	Portugal
	Report	Figo 10'; Hélder 75'; Rui Costa 88'

Qemal Stafa, Tirana
Attendance: 16,000
Referee: Oguz Sarvan (Turkey)

9 November 1996
17:30 UTC+1

Germany	1–1	Northern Ireland
Möller 40'	Report	Taggart 38'

Frankenstadion, Nuremberg
Attendance: 40,718
Referee: Ahmet Çakar (Turkey)
9 November 1996
20:45 UTC

Portugal	1–0	Ukraine
Fernando Couto 58'	Report

Estádio das Antas, Porto
Attendance: 19,106
Referee: Leif Sundell (Sweden)
9 November 1996
14:00 UTC+1

Albania	1–1	Armenia
Franholli 57'	Report	Ter-Petrosyan 90'

Qemal Stafa, Tirana
Attendance: 7,000
Referee: Fritz Stuchlik (Austria)

14 December 1996
20:45 UTC

Portugal	0–0	Germany
	Report

Estádio da Luz, Lisbon
Attendance: 50,000
Referee: Sándor Puhl (Hungary)
14 December 1996
15:00 UTC

Northern Ireland	2–0	Albania
Dowie 12', 21'	Report

Windsor Park, Belfast
Attendance: 7,935
Referee: Andreas Georgiou (Cyprus)

29 March 1997
18:00 UTC+1

Albania	0–1	Ukraine
	Report	Rebrov 40'

Estadio Nuevo Los Cármenes, Granada (Note: Played in neutral ground due to the 1997 rebellion in Albania.)
Attendance: 1,200
Referee: John McDermott (Republic of Ireland)
29 March 1997
15:00 UTC

Northern Ireland	0–0	Portugal
	Report

Windsor Park, Belfast
Attendance: 9,400
Referee: Graziano Cesari (Italy)

2 April 1997
19:30 UTC+2

Albania	2–3	Germany
Kola 61', 90+2' (pen.)	Report	Kirsten 63', 80', 83'

Estadio Nuevo Los Cármenes, Granada
Attendance: 9,780
Referee: Michel Piraux (Belgium)
2 April 1997
19:30 UTC+3

Ukraine	2–1	Northern Ireland
Kosovskyi 3'; Shevchenko 70'	Report	Dowie 14' (pen.)

Olimpiyskiy, Kyiv
Attendance: 85,000
Referee: Václav Krondl (Czech Republic)

30 April 1997
19:30 UTC+2

Germany	2–0	Ukraine
Bierhoff 62'; Basler 71'	Report

Weserstadion, Bremen
Attendance: 33,242
Referee: Anders Frisk (Sweden)
30 April 1997
17:00 UTC+4

Armenia	0–0	Northern Ireland
	Report

Hrazdan Stadium, Yerevan
Attendance: 5,000
Referee: Karl-Erik Nilsson (Sweden)

7 May 1997
19:00 UTC+3

Ukraine	1–1	Armenia
Shevchenko 6'	Report	Petrosyan 77'

Olimpiyskiy, Kyiv
Attendance: 47,000
Referee: Atanas Uzunov (Bulgaria)

7 June 1997
19:00 UTC+3

Ukraine	0–0	Germany
	Report

Olimpyskiy, Kyiv
Attendance: 63,000
Referee: László Vágner (Hungary)
7 June 1997
21:30 UTC+1

Portugal	2–0	Albania
João V. Pinto 14'; Figo 70'	Report

Estadio das Antas, Porto
Attendance: 14,000
Referee: Terje Hauge (Norway)

20 August 1997
19:30 UTC+1

Northern Ireland	1–3	Germany
Hughes 59'	Report	Bierhoff 72', 77', 78'

Windsor Park, Belfast
Attendance: 12,037
Referee: José María García-Aranda (Spain)
20 August 1997
19:00 UTC+3

Ukraine	1–0	Albania
Rebrov 86'	Report

Olimpiyskiy, Kyiv
Attendance: 38,000
Referee: Ľuboš Micheľ (Slovakia)
20 August 1997
21:30 UTC+1

Portugal	3–1	Armenia
Domingos 23'; Figo 31'; Pedro Barbosa 55'	Report	Assadourian 46'

Estadio do Bonfim, Setúbal
Attendance: 16,000
Referee: Marcel Lica (Romania)

6 September 1997
20:00 UTC+2

Germany	1–1	Portugal
Kirsten 80'	Report	Barbosa 70'

Olympiastadion, Berlin
Attendance: 75,841
Referee: Marc Batta (France)
6 September 1997
17:00 UTC+4

Armenia	3–0	Albania
Vardanyan 56'; Assadourian 81'; Avalyan 87' (pen.)	Report

Hrazdan Stadium, Yerevan
Attendance: 5,000
Referee: Miroslav Radoman (Yugoslavia)

10 September 1997
19:30 UTC+2

Germany	4–0	Armenia
Klinsmann 70', 84'; Häßler 85'; Kirsten 90+1'	Report

Westfalenstadion, Dortmund
Attendance: 43,000
Referee: Peter Mikkelsen (Denmark)
10 September 1997
17:00 UTC+2

Albania	1–0	Northern Ireland
Haxhi 65'	Report

Hardturm, Zürich
Attendance: 2,650
Referee: Roger Philippi (Luxembourg)

11 October 1997
18:30 UTC+2

Germany	4–3	Albania
Helmer 64'; Bierhoff 78', 90'; Marschall 85'	Report	Kohler 55' (o.g.); Tare 80'; Vata 87'

Niedersachsenstadion, Hanover
Attendance: 44,522
Referee: Rune Pedersen (Norway)
11 October 1997
20:30 UTC+4

Armenia	0–2	Ukraine
	Report	Shevchenko 33'; Maksymov 54'

Hrazdan Stadium, Yerevan
Attendance: 7,500
Referee: Manuel Díaz Vega (Spain)
11 October 1997
17:30 UTC+1

Portugal	1–0	Northern Ireland
Conceição 18'	Report

Estádio da Luz, Lisbon
Attendance: 31,847
Referee: Peter Mikkelsen (Denmark)

== Goalscorers ==
There were 66 goals scored in 30 matches, for an average of 2.2 goals per match.

6 goals

- (Germany) Oliver Bierhoff

5 goals

- (Germany) Ulf Kirsten

3 goals

- (Armenia) Éric Assadourian
- (Germany) Thomas Häßler
- (Germany) Jürgen Klinsmann
- (Northern Ireland) Iain Dowie
- (Portugal) Luís Figo
- (Ukraine) Serhii Rebrov
- (Ukraine) Andriy Shevchenko

2 goals

- (Albania) Bledar Kola
- (Portugal) Pedro Barbosa
- (Portugal) João Vieira Pinto
- (Ukraine) Yuriy Maksymov

1 goal

- (Albania) Bajram Franholli
- (Albania) Altin Haxhi
- (Albania) Igli Tare
- (Albania) Rudi Vata
- (Armenia) Garnik Avalyan
- (Armenia) Karapet Mikaelyan
- (Armenia) Artur Petrosyan
- (Armenia) Hakob Ter-Petrosyan
- (Armenia) Harutyun Vardanyan
- (Germany) Mario Basler
- (Germany) Fredi Bobić
- (Germany) Thomas Helmer
- (Germany) Stefan Kuntz
- (Germany) Olaf Marschall
- (Germany) Andreas Möller
- (Northern Ireland) Michael Hughes
- (Northern Ireland) Neil Lennon
- (Northern Ireland) Gerry Taggart
- (Portugal) Sérgio Conceição
- (Portugal) Rui Costa
- (Portugal) Fernando Couto
- (Portugal) Hélder Cristóvão
- (Portugal) Domingos Paciência
- (Ukraine) Vitaliy Kosovskyi
- (Ukraine) Serhiy Popov

1 own goal

- (Germany) Jurgen Kohler (playing against Albania)
