= Karapet Mikaelyan =

Armenian football player

Personal information
- Full name: Karapet Mikaelyan
- Date of birth: 27 September 1969 (age 57)
- Place of birth: Moscow, Soviet Union
- Height: 1.68 m (5 ft 6 in)
- Position: Forward

Youth career
- 1988: FC Spartak Moscow

Senior career*
| Years | Team | Apps | (Gls) |
| 1989–1992 | FC Amur Komsomolsk-na-Amure | 61 | (4) |
| 1992–1995 | FC Zvezda Irkutsk | 118 | (45) |
| 1996 | FC Sokol-Saratov | 38 | (20) |
| 1997 | Bucheon SK | 9 | (1) |
| 1998 | FC Sokol-Saratov | 9 | (1) |
| 1998 | FC Gazovik-Gazprom Izhevsk | 12 | (3) |
| 1999–2000 | FC Krylia Sovetov Samara | 37 | (10) |
| 2001 | FC Nika Moscow | 22 | (7) |
| 2002 | FC KUZBASS Kemerovo | 25 | (14) |
| 2003 | FC Dynamo Stavropol | 16 | (2) |
| 2003–2004 | FC Lukoil Chelyabinsk | 52 | (12) |
| 2005 | FC Nika Moscow | 27 | (11) |
| 2006 | FC Chita | 16 | (2) |
| 2006–2008 | FC Nika Moscow | 43 | (6) |
| | Total | 502 | (138 ) |

International career
| 1996–1999 | Armenia | 20 | (2) |
- * Club domestic league appearances and goals

Karapet Mikaelyan (Armenian: Կարապետ Միքայելյան, born 27 September 1969) is a former Russian-born Armenian football striker. Karapet was also a member of Armenia national team, participated in 20 international matches and scored 2 goals since his debut on 5 October 1996, in away match against Northern Ireland.

== Health problems ==
In September 2011, Mikaelyan has been diagnosed with severe heart failure and was in urgent need of heart transplantation. The fans of his former clubs FC Zvezda Irkutsk and FC Krylia Sovetov Samara had raised funds to finance his heart surgery. However, the president of Armenian Football Federation Ruben Hayrapetyan has announced that the heart operation will be financed through his federation.

Mikaelyan underwent heart surgery on 14 March 2013. The Union of Football Players and Coaches of Russia was raising money for Mikayelyan's surgery since 25 February. The 935,000 rubles (approx. $30,487)-worth surgery went successfully. FC Krylia Sovetov and the Football Federation of Armenia were among those that had provided financial support to Karapet Mikaelyan.

== International goals ==
| # | Date | Venue | Opponent | Score | Result | Competition |
|---|---|---|---|---|---|---|
| 1 | 9 October 1996 | Armenia | Germany | 1–5 | Loss | 1998 WCQ |
| 2 | 8 September 1999 | Armenia | France | 2–3 | Loss | 2000 ECQ |
