= Éric Assadourian =

Footballer (born 1966)

Personal information
- Date of birth: 24 June 1966 (age 60)
- Place of birth: Saint-Maurice, France
- Height: 1.75 m (5 ft 9 in)
- Position: Striker

Team information
- Current team: Lens (head of academy)

Youth career
- 1984 – 1986: INF Vichy

Senior career*
Years	Team	Apps	(Gls)
1986–1988	Toulouse	18	(0)
1987–1988	Guingamp	12	(1)
1988–1990	Toulouse	43	(9)
1990–1995	Lille	178	(27)
1995–1996	Lyon	30	(2)
1996–1997	Guingamp	9	(0)
1997–1998	Louhans-Cuiseaux	35	(8)
1998–1999	Beauvais	35	(13)
1999–2001	Valence	58	(11)
Total		418	(71)

International career
1996–1998	Armenia	12	(3)

Managerial career
- 2011–2012: Lens B
- 2014–2019: Brest U19
- 2019: Rennes U19
- * Club domestic league appearances and goals

Éric Assadourian (Armenian: Էրիկ Ասադուրյան, born on 24 June 1966) is a former professional footballer who played as a striker. As of 2020, he is the head of the academy of Lens.

Born in France, he played for the Armenia national team, participating in 12 international matches and scoring 3 goals after making his debut on 5 October 1996 in an away 1998 World Cup qualification match against Northern Ireland.

== Coaching and managerial career ==
After retiring, Assadourian worked for Stade Brestois 29 and RC Lens in the youth sectors. From 2005 until 2011, he had different roles at Lens including managing the U18 squad and senior reserve team.

From June 2012 to June 2014, he worked for Qatari club Al-Duhail also in the youth sector. He then returned to Stade Brestois 29 and became manager of their U19's. In June 2019, he was appointed manager of Stade Rennais' U19 squad and responsible for the youth sector. However, after four months, he decided to resign from the positions.

In January 2020, he returned to Lens as head of the club's academy.

== Career statistics ==
#	Date	Venue	Opponent	Score	Result	Competition
1	5 October 1996	Northern Ireland	Northern Ireland	1–1	Draw	1998 WCQ
2	20 August 1997	Portugal	Portugal	1–3	Loss	1998 WCQ
3	6 September 1997	Armenia	Albania	3–0	Win	1998 WCQ

== Honours ==
Toulouse

- Division 1 third place: 1986–87

Guingamp

- UEFA Intertoto Cup: 1996
- Coupe de France finalist: 1996–97
