= László Klausz =

Hungarian footballer

Personal information
- Date of birth: 24 June 1971 (age 55)
- Place of birth: Tatabánya, Hungary
- Height: 1.89 m (6 ft 2 in)
- Position: Striker

Team information
- Current team: Tiszakécske (manager)

Senior career*
Years	Team	Apps	(Gls)
1989–1992	FC Tatabánya	67	(11)
1992–1994	Győri ETO FC	58	(14)
1994–1997	Admira Wacker	75	(17)
1997–1998	SV Austria Salzburg	34	(9)
1998–1999	FC Sochaux-Montbéliard	22	(3)
1999–2002	SV Waldhof Mannheim	91	(31)
2002–2004	SW Bregenz	65	(14)
2004–2005	SC-ESV Parndorf	25	(7)

International career
1993–2000	Hungary	27	(6)

Managerial career
- 2015–2017: Szeged-Csanád
- 2017–2018: Cegléd
- 2019–2020: Pénzügyőr
- 2020–2021: Honvéd (assistant)
- 2021–2022: Győri ETO
- 2022–: Tiszakécske
- * Club domestic league appearances and goals

László Klausz (born 24 June 1971) is a Hungarian football coach and a former player. He is the manager of Tiszakécske FC.

== International career ==
He was a member of the Hungary national football team from 1993 to 2000.

=== International goals ===
Goal	Date	Venue	Opponent	Score	Result	Competition
1.	4 May 1994	Stadion Suche Stawy, Kraków, Poland	Poland	2-1	2-3	Friendly
2.	14 December 1994	Estadio Azteca, Mexico City, Mexico	Mexico	1-0	1-5	Friendly
3.	14 August 1996	Bányász Stadion, Siófok, Hungary	United Arab Emirates	1-0	3-1	Friendly
4.	2 April 1997	Népstadion, Budapest, Hungary	Australia	1-1	1-3	Friendly
5.	20 August 1997	Népstadion, Budapest, Hungary	Switzerland	1-0	1-1	1998 FIFA World Cup qualification
6.	10 September 1997	Üllői úti stadion, Budapest, Hungary	Azerbaijan	1-0	3-1	1998 FIFA World Cup qualification

== Coaching career ==
Klausz signed a two-year contract as a manager of Győri ETO on 2 June 2021.
