= Luca Gobbi =

Sammarinese footballer

Personal information
- Full name: Luca Gobbi
- Date of birth: 12 June 1971 (age 55)
- Place of birth: San Marino
- Position: Defender

Senior career*
Years	Team	Apps	(Gls)
1990–1991	Juvenes/Dogana		
1993–1995	A.C. Cattolica Calcio		
1995–1999	Juvenes/Dogana		
1999–2006	S.P. Tre Penne		

International career^{‡}
1990–2002	San Marino	41	(0)
- * Club domestic league appearances and goals ‡ National team caps and goals as of 16 March 2012

Luca Gobbi (born 12 June 1971) is a San Marino former footballer.

== International career ==
Gobbi was a member of the San Marino national football team from 1990 to 2002.
