= Hakob Ter-Petrosyan =

Armenian footballer

Personal information
- Date of birth: 31 August 1971 (age 55)
- Position: Midfielder

Senior career*
Years	Team	Apps	(Gls)
- Spartak Hoktemberyan
- FC Spitak
- Koshkagorts Yerevan
1995–1997	FC Ararat Yerevan		
1997	FC Yerevan		

International career
1994–1997	Armenia	17	(1)
- * Club domestic league appearances and goals

Hakob Ter-Petrosyan (born 31 August 1971) is a retired Armenian football midfielder.
