= Oktay Derelioğlu =

Turkish footballer and manager

Personal information
- Date of birth: 17 December 1975 (age 50)
- Place of birth: Istanbul, Turkey
- Height: 1.79 m (5 ft 10 in)
- Position: Forward

Senior career*
Years	Team	Apps	(Gls)
1990–1992	Fatih Karagümrük	20	(5)
1992–1993	Trabzonspor	2	(0)
1993–1999	Beşiktaş	155	(69)
1999	Siirtspor	4	(2)
1999–2000	→ Gaziantepspor (loan)	20	(16)
2000	UD Las Palmas	2	(0)
2000–2001	Trabzonspor	13	(14)
2001–2003	Fenerbahçe	21	(5)
2003	Samsunspor	17	(4)
2003–2004	1. FC Nürnberg	5	(1)
2004	Akçaabat Sebatspor	21	(9)
2004–2005	Khazar Lankaran	17	(16)
2005–2006	Sakaryaspor	4	(0)
2006	Diyarbakırspor	2	(0)
2006–2007	İstanbulspor	3	(0)
2007	Yalovaspor	5	(2)
2007–2008	Fatih Karagümrük	4	(1)
Total		315	(144)

International career
1990–1992	Turkey U16	14	(10)
1992	Turkey U17	2	(0)
1991–1993	Turkey U18	35	(14)
1994–1997	Turkey U21	14	(9)
1995–2001	Turkey	18	(9)

Managerial career
- 2017: Kahramanmaraşspor
- 2018: Gaziantepspor
- 2018: Fatih Karagümrük
- 2018: Darıca Gençlerbirliği
- 2019: Tokatspor
- 2020: Amed S.K.
- 2021-2023: KF Gostivari
- * Club domestic league appearances and goals

Oktay Derelioğlu (born 17 December 1975) is a Turkish football manager and former player.

Derelioğlu played as a forward and is notable for his goal for the Turkey national team against Belgium during the qualifying rounds of the 1998 FIFA World Cup. The goal started at midfield before Derelioğlu jinked past six Belgian defenders, one of them twice, mimicking Diego Maradona's "Goal of the Century".

Derelioğlu holds the record for most goals in European competitions for Beşiktaş with 14.

== Club career ==
=== Early club career (1990–1993) ===
Derelioğlu was born in Istanbul and began his club career with local club Fatih Karagümrük. He made his debut at the age of 14, coming on as a substitute in the 66th minute. In two seasons with the club, Derelioğlu netted five times in 20 matches. Trabzonspor transferred him the following season. With Trabzonspor, Derelioğlu did not find many chances, featuring twice in his first and only season with the club. He scored four times in three matches for the youth team. Beşiktaş transferred him at the start of the 1993–94 season.

=== Beşiktaş (1993–1998) ===
Derelioğlu made his debut on 29 August 1993, starting alongside the likes of Feyyaz Uçar, Sergen Yalçın, and Rıza Çalımbay. Derelioğlu scored nine times in 27 matches during his first season. Derelioğlu continued scoring at that rate before breaking out during the 1996–97 season, netting 22 times in the league and four times in cup competitions.

=== Journeyman years (1999–2008) ===
Siirtspor transferred him at the start of the 1999–2000 where he scored twice in four matches before being loaned out to Gaziantepspor on 11 November 1999. Derelioğlu spent the rest of the season with the club, scoring 16 times in 20 matches. The following season, Derelioğlu moved abroad to Las Palmas for £2 million.

Derelioğlu spent two months with the club before returning to Turkey, making two appearances. Derelioğlu was the subject of controversy with the Spanish club, getting into a physical altercation with then-captain Vinny Samways during a training session. He also complained that his teammates were not passing the ball to him.

In his first season back with Trabzonspor, Derelioğlu scored 14 times in 13 matches. However, he left the club and signed Fenerbahçe on 25 July 2001, complaining that he had not been paid by Trabzonspor. He moved to Samsunspor on the last day of the 2002–03 winter transfer window.

At the end of the season, Derelioğlu moved abroad for a second time, but returned to Turkey during the winter transfer window. With Akçaabat Sebatspor, Derelioğlu netted nine times in 21 matches. Khazar Lankaran transferred him at the start of the 2004–05 season.

Derelioğlu moved back to Turkey during the winter transfer window and made 18 appearances for four different clubs in two-and-a-half seasons. Derelioğlu finished his career with his first club, Fatih Karagümrük, scoring one goal in four matches. He retired before the end of the 2007–08 season.

== International career ==
Derelioğlu started his international career with the Turkey U-16 squad in 1990. He was also capped at U-17, U-18, and U-21 levels, totaling 65 caps and 33 goals at youth level. He earned his first senior call-up in 1995, and scored nine goals in 18 caps from 1995 to 2001.

== International goals ==
No.	Date	Venue	Opponent	Score	Result	Competition
1.	10 November 1996	Ali Sami Yen Stadium, Istanbul, Turkey	San Marino	1–0	7–0	1998 FIFA World Cup qualification
2.	10 November 1996	Ali Sami Yen Stadium, Istanbul, Turkey	San Marino	2–0	7–0	1998 FIFA World Cup qualification
3.	10 November 1996	Ali Sami Yen Stadium, Istanbul, Turkey	San Marino	3–0	7–0	1998 FIFA World Cup qualification
4.	10 November 1996	Ali Sami Yen Stadium, Istanbul, Turkey	San Marino	4–0	7–0	1998 FIFA World Cup qualification
5.	30 April 1997	Ali Sami Yen Stadium, Istanbul, Turkey	Belgium	1–2	1–3	1998 FIFA World Cup qualification
6.	21 January 1998	Atatürk Stadium, Antalya, Turkey	Albania	1–3	1–4	Friendly
7.	5 September 1998	Ali Sami Yen Stadium, Istanbul, Turkey	Northern Ireland	1–0	3–0	UEFA Euro 2000 qualifying
8.	5 September 1998	Ali Sami Yen Stadium, Istanbul, Turkey	Northern Ireland	3–0	3–0	UEFA Euro 2000 qualifying
9.	2 June 2001	İnönü Stadium, Istanbul, Turkey	Azerbaijan	2–0	3–0	2002 FIFA World Cup qualification
