= 1998 FIFA World Cup qualification – UEFA Group 1 =

Football tournament qualifying stage

Group 1 consisted of five teams entered into the European zone: Bosnia and Herzegovina, Croatia, Denmark, Greece, and Slovenia. These five teams competed on a home-and-away basis for two of the 15 spots in the final tournament allocated to the European zone, with the group's winner and runner-up claiming those spots.

== Standings ==
Pos	Team	Pld	W	D	L	GF	GA	GD	Pts	Qualification	Denmark national football team	Croatia national football team	Greece national football team	Bosnia and Herzegovina national football team	Slovenia national football team
1	Denmark	8	5	2	1	14	6	+8	17	Qualification to 1998 FIFA World Cup	—	3–1	2–1	2–0	4–0
2	Croatia	8	4	3	1	17	12	+5	15	Advance to second round	1–1	—	1–1	3–2	3–3
3	Greece	8	4	2	2	11	4	+7	14		0–0	0–1	—	3–0	2–0
4	Bosnia and Herzegovina	8	3	0	5	9	14	−5	9		3–0	1–4	0–1	—	1–0
5	Slovenia	8	0	1	7	5	20	−15	1		0–2	1–3	0–3	1–2	—

== Matches ==
24 April 1996
20:00 UTC+3

Greece	2–0	Slovenia
Batista 55'; Nikolaidis 65'	Report

Olympic Stadium, Athens
Attendance: 5,053
Referee: Rune Pedersen (Norway)

1 September 1996
20:00 UTC+2

Slovenia	0–2	Denmark
	Report	A. Nielsen 78'; Schjønberg 89'

Stadion za Bežigradom, Ljubljana
Attendance: 5,000
Referee: Urs Meier (Switzerland)
1 September 1996
17:30 UTC+3

Greece	3–0	Bosnia and Herzegovina
Ouzounidis 41'; Apostolakis 79'; Nikolaidis 84'	Report

Kalamata Metropolitan Stadium, Kalamata
Attendance: 4,020
Referee: Günter Benkö (Austria)

8 October 1996
20:00 UTC+2

Bosnia and Herzegovina	1–4	Croatia
Salihamidžić 25'	Report	Bilić 13'; Vlaović 32'; Bokšić 64', 85'

Stadio Renato Dall'Ara, Bologna (Note: Match played in Bologna due to the renovation of the Asim Ferhatović Hase Stadium.)
Attendance: 1,500
Referee: Atanas Uzunov (Bulgaria)
9 October 1996
19:15 UTC+2

Denmark	2–1	Greece
Zagorakis 25' (o.g.); B. Laudrup 52'	Report	Donis 35'

Parken Stadium, Copenhagen
Attendance: 40,262
Referee: Paul Durkin (England)

10 November 1996
20:15 UTC+1

Croatia	1–1	Greece
Šuker 44'	Report	Nikolaidis 9'

Maksimir Stadium, Zagreb
Attendance: 24,000
Referee: Mario van der Ende (Netherlands)
10 November 1996
15:00 UTC+1

Slovenia	1–2	Bosnia and Herzegovina
Zahovič 41' (pen.)	Report	Bolić 5'; Kodro 33'

Stadion za Bežigradom, Ljubljana
Attendance: 3,200
Referee: Charles Agius (Malta)

29 March 1997
20:15 UTC+1

Croatia	1–1	Denmark
Šuker 49'	Report	B. Laudrup 82'

Poljud, Split
Attendance: 33,865
Referee: Piero Ceccarini (Italy)

2 April 1997
20:15 UTC+2

Croatia	3–3	Slovenia
Prosinečki 33'; Boban 43', 60'	Report	Gliha 45', 65', 66'

Poljud, Split
Attendance: 15,365
Referee: Paul Durkin (England)
2 April 1997
15:30 UTC+2

Bosnia and Herzegovina	0–1	Greece
	Report	Frantzeskos 73'

Koševo Stadium, Sarajevo
Attendance: 33,000
Referee: Alain Sars (France)

30 April 1997
19:15 UTC+2

Denmark	4–0	Slovenia
A. Nielsen 3', 55'; P. Pedersen 28'; B. Laudrup 50'	Report

Parken Stadium, Copenhagen
Attendance: 41,278
Referee: Hellmut Krug (Germany)
30 April 1997
21:00 UTC+3

Greece	0–1	Croatia
	Report	Šuker 74'

Kaftanzoglio Stadium, Thessaloniki
Attendance: 10,730
Referee: Antonio Jesús López Nieto (Spain)

8 June 1997
15:00 UTC+2

Denmark	2–0	Bosnia and Herzegovina
Rieper 67'; Molnar 89'	Report

Parken Stadium, Copenhagen
Attendance: 41,592
Referee: Karol Ihring (Slovakia)

20 August 1997
20:30 UTC+2

Bosnia and Herzegovina	3–0	Denmark
Mujčin 19'; Bolić 25', 35'	Report

Koševo Stadium, Sarajevo
Attendance: 36,500
Referee: Vítor Melo Pereira (Portugal)

6 September 1997
20:15 UTC+2

Croatia	3–2	Bosnia and Herzegovina
Bilić 27'; Marić 39'; Boban 79'	Report	Ladić 17' (o.g.); Salihamidžić 55'

Maksimir Stadium, Zagreb
Attendance: 16,518
Referee: Hugh Dallas (Scotland)
6 September 1997
20:15 UTC+2

Slovenia	0–3	Greece
	Report	Alexandris 54'; Konstantinidis 89'; Machlas 90+1'

Stadion za Bežigradom, Ljubljana
Attendance: 4,689
Referee: Karol Ihring (Slovakia)

10 September 1997
19:15 UTC+2

Denmark	3–1	Croatia
B. Laudrup 15'; M. Laudrup 34'; Molnar 40'	Report	Šuker 44'

Parken Stadium, Copenhagen
Attendance: 41,381
Referee: Sándor Puhl (Hungary)
10 September 1997
20:15 UTC+2

Bosnia and Herzegovina	1–0	Slovenia
Bolić 22'	Report

Koševo Stadium, Sarajevo
Attendance: 18,000
Referee: Taras Bezubiak (Russia)

11 October 1997
21:00 UTC+3

Greece	0–0	Denmark
	Report

Olympic Stadium, Athens
Attendance: 64,272
Referee: Gilles Veissière (France)
11 October 1997
20:00 UTC+2

Slovenia	1–3	Croatia
Zahovič 72'	Report	Šuker 11'; Soldo 39'; Bokšić 50'

Stadion za Bežigradom, Ljubljana
Attendance: 5,500
Referee: Armand Ancion (Belgium)

== Goalscorers ==
There were 56 goals scored in 20 matches, for an average of 2.8 goals per match.

5 goals

- (Croatia) Davor Šuker

4 goals

- (Bosnia and Herzegovina) Elvir Bolić
- (Denmark) Brian Laudrup

3 goals

- (Croatia) Zvonimir Boban
- (Croatia) Alen Bokšić
- (Denmark) Allan Nielsen
- (Greece) Demis Nikolaidis
- (Slovenia) Primož Gliha

2 goals

- (Bosnia and Herzegovina) Hasan Salihamidžić
- (Croatia) Slaven Bilić
- (Denmark) Miklos Molnar
- (Slovenia) Zlatko Zahovič

1 goal

- (Bosnia and Herzegovina) Meho Kodro
- (Bosnia and Herzegovina) Edin Mujčin
- (Croatia) Silvio Marić
- (Croatia) Robert Prosinečki
- (Croatia) Zvonimir Soldo
- (Croatia) Goran Vlaović
- (Denmark) Michael Laudrup
- (Denmark) Per Pedersen
- (Denmark) Marc Rieper
- (Denmark) Michael Schjønberg
- (Greece) Alekos Alexandris
- (Greece) Stratos Apostolakis
- (Greece) Georgios Donis
- (Greece) Kostas Frantzeskos
- (Greece) Kostas Konstantinidis
- (Greece) Daniel Batista
- (Greece) Nikos Machlas
- (Greece) Marinos Ouzounidis

1 own goal

- (Croatia) Dražen Ladić (against Bosnia & Herzegovina)
- (Greece) Theodoros Zagorakis (against Denmark)
