= 1998 FIFA World Cup qualification – UEFA second round =

Football tournament qualification stage

The 1998 FIFA World Cup European qualification playoffs were a set of home-and-away playoffs to decide the final four places granted to national football teams from European nations (more precisely, UEFA members) for the 1998 FIFA World Cup.

The playoffs were decided by the standard FIFA method of aggregate score, with away goals and, if necessary, extra time with the possibility of a penalty shoot-out at the end of the second leg. The winner of each playoff was awarded a place in the 1998 FIFA World Cup.

== Qualified teams ==
By the rules of the UEFA qualifying tournament, the first-place finishers in each of the nine groups received automatic berths, along with the best second-place team that had earned the most points. As some groups had six teams and others had five, the matches vs the fifth and sixth place teams were discarded for the purposes of the ranking, despite the fact that discarding results vs the sixth placed team would have sufficed.

The eight remaining second-place teams were competed in this round: An open draw was held on 13 October 1997 at FIFA headquarters in Zürich.

Pos	Grp	Team	Pld	W	D	L	GF	GA	GD	Pts	Qualification
1	4	Scotland	6	4	1	1	8	2	+6	13	Qualification to 1998 FIFA World Cup
2	2	Italy	6	3	3	0	5	0	+5	12	Advance to second round (play-offs)
3	7	Belgium	6	4	0	2	11	11	0	12	Advance to second round (play-offs)
4	5	Russia	6	3	2	1	12	5	+7	11	Advance to second round (play-offs)
5	1	Croatia	6	3	2	1	11	8	+3	11	Advance to second round (play-offs)
6	6	FR Yugoslavia	6	3	2	1	7	5	+2	11	Advance to second round (play-offs)
7	8	Republic of Ireland	6	2	2	2	8	6	+2	8	Advance to second round (play-offs)
8	9	Ukraine	6	2	2	2	5	5	0	8	Advance to second round (play-offs)
9	3	Hungary	6	1	3	2	4	7	−3	6	Advance to second round (play-offs)

== Matches ==
Team 1	Agg.	Team 2	1st leg	2nd leg
Croatia	3–1	Ukraine	2–0	1–1
Russia	1–2	Italy	1–1	0–1
Republic of Ireland	2–3	Belgium	1–1	1–2
Hungary	1–12	FR Yugoslavia	1–7	0–5

29 October 1997
18:00 UTC+1

Croatia	2–0	Ukraine
Bilić 11'; Vlaović 49'	Report

Maksimir Stadium, Zagreb
Attendance: 28,000
Referee: Alain Sars (France)
15 November 1997
19:00 UTC+2

Ukraine	1–1	Croatia
Shevchenko 5'	Report	Bokšić 27'

Olimpiysky, Kyiv
Attendance: 77,500
Referee: Rune Pedersen (Norway)

Croatia won 3–1 on aggregate.

29 October 1997
20:30 UTC+3

Russia	1–1	Italy
Cannavaro 52' (o.g.)	Report	Vieri 49'

Dynamo Stadium, Moscow
Attendance: 15,000
Referee: Peter Mikkelsen (Denmark)
15 November 1997
20:45 UTC+1

Italy	1–0	Russia
Casiraghi 53'	Report

Stadio San Paolo, Naples
Attendance: 69,207
Referee: Serge Muhmenthaler (Switzerland)

Italy won 2–1 on aggregate.

29 October 1997
20:00 UTC+1

Hungary	1–7	FR Yugoslavia
Illés 88'	Report	Brnović 2'; Đukić 6'; Savićević 10'; Mijatović 26', 41', 51'; Milošević 63'

Stadion Albert Flórián, Budapest
Attendance: 13,175
Referee: Vítor Melo Pereira (Portugal)
15 November 1997
17:00 UTC+1

FR Yugoslavia	5–0	Hungary
Milošević 18'; Mijatović 44', 45' (pen.), 71', 88'	Report

Stadion Crvena Zvezda, Belgrade
Attendance: 48,498
Referee: Metin Tokat (Turkey)

Yugoslavia won 12–1 on aggregate.

29 October 1997
19:30 UTC±0

Republic of Ireland	1–1	Belgium
Irwin 7'	Report	Nilis 29'

Lansdowne Road, Dublin
Attendance: 32,305
Referee: László Vagner (Hungary)
15 November 1997
20:00 UTC+1

Belgium	2–1	Republic of Ireland
Oliveira 25'; Nilis 70'	Report	Houghton 58'

King Baudouin Stadium, Brussels
Attendance: 35,320
Referee: Günter Benkö (Austria)

Belgium won 3–2 on aggregate.

== Goalscorers ==
There were 25 goals scored in 8 matches, for an average of 3.12 goals per match.

7 goals

- (Federal Republic of Yugoslavia) Predrag Mijatović

2 goals

- (Belgium) Luc Nilis
- (Federal Republic of Yugoslavia) Savo Milošević

1 goal

- (Belgium) Luís Oliveira
- (Croatia) Slaven Bilić
- (Croatia) Alen Bokšić
- (Croatia) Goran Vlaović
- (Hungary) Béla Illés
- (Republic of Ireland) Ray Houghton
- (Republic of Ireland) Denis Irwin
- (Italy) Pierluigi Casiraghi
- (Italy) Christian Vieri
- (Ukraine) Andriy Shevchenko
- (Federal Republic of Yugoslavia) Branko Brnović
- (Federal Republic of Yugoslavia) Miroslav Đukić
- (Federal Republic of Yugoslavia) Dejan Savićević

1 own goal

- (Italy) Fabio Cannavaro (against Russia)
