= Eric Van Meir =

Belgian footballer

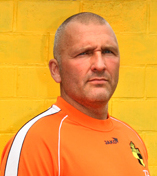

Personal information
- Date of birth: 28 February 1968 (age 58)
- Place of birth: Deurne, Belgium
- Height: 1.95 m (6 ft 5 in)
- Position: Defender

Team information
- Current team: Belgium U-19 (assistant)

Senior career*
Years	Team	Apps	(Gls)
1985–1991	Berchem	124	(9)
1991–1996	Charleroi	115	(14)
1996–2001	Lierse	145	(57)
2001–2003	Standard Liège	35	(2)
Total		419	(82)

International career
1993–2002	Belgium	34	(1)

Managerial career
- 2003–2010: Lierse (assistant)
- 2010–2011: Lierse
- 2011: Turnhout
- 2013: Lierse (assistant)
- 2013: Lierse
- 2014: Berchem
- 2014–2015: Lierse (assistant)
- 2015–2017: Lierse
- 2020–: Belgium U-19 (assistant)
- * Club domestic league appearances and goals

Eric Van Meir (Dutch pronunciation: [ˈɛrɪk fɑ ˈmɛiər]; (Note: In isolation, van is pronounced [vɑn].) born 28 February 1968) is a Belgian football manager and former player who played as a defender.

His former clubs include Lierse, Charleroi and Standard Liège. Van Meir played for Belgium and was in the squad for the 1994, 1998 and 2002 World Cups and also for the Euro 2000 but played only a few matches.

Van Meir won the Belgian First Division Title with Lierse in 1997, and the Belgian Cup in 1999, also with Lierse. In 1997, he scored 17 goals and won second place in the Belgian Golden Shoe award.

== Club football ==
Van Meir played in his career for Hoboken SK, Berchem Sport, Sporting Charleroi, Lierse SK and Standard Liège, enjoying the most successful spell in his career at Lierse, winning the Belgian League in 1997, the Belgian Cup in 1999 and the Belgian Supercup in 1997 and 1999. He also finished second in 1997 in the Golden Boot voting behind Pär Zetterberg.

He also played several times in European club football, including the Champions League in season 1997–98.

Meir scored exceptionally high for a defender. He was in top scorer for his club in 1997, 1998 and 2000.

At the 100-year anniversary of Lierse in 2006, Van Meir was elected by supporters as a player in the "Lierse team of the century".

== International career ==
Van Meir played for the Belgium national team for almost ten years. He attended three World Cups (1994, 1998, 2002) and one European Championship (2000), but each time he only played a few matches. In total he won 35 caps for the national team.

== Coaching career ==
Following his retirement as a player in 2003, Van Meir was appointed an assistant coach at Lierse SK. Following the dismissal of Aimé Anthuenis in September 2010 in the club's first season back in the Belgian First Division, Van Meir took over as head coach of the club, assisted by Chris Janssens, but was replaced in the beginning of 2011 by Trond Sollied.

In March 2020, Van Meir was hired as an assistant manager for Belgium U-19 under manager Wesley Sonck.

== Honours ==
Lierse

- Belgian First Division: 1996–97
- Belgian Cup: 1998–99
- Belgian Supercup: 1997, 1999

Belgium

- FIFA Fair Play Trophy: 2002 World Cup
