= 1998 FIFA World Cup qualification – UEFA Group 2 =

Football tournament qualifying stage

Group 2 consisted of five of the 50 teams entered into the European zone: (Note: Only 49 of the entered teams actually competed in the qualification tournament: France qualified for the World Cup automatically as host.) England, Georgia, Italy, Moldova, and Poland. These five teams competed on a home-and-away basis for two of the 15 spots in the final tournament allocated to the European zone, with the group's winner and runner-up claiming those spots.

== Standings ==
Pos	Team	Pld	W	D	L	GF	GA	GD	Pts	Qualification	England national football team	Italy national football team	Poland national football team	Georgia national football team	Moldova national football team
1	England	8	6	1	1	15	2	+13	19	Qualification to 1998 FIFA World Cup	—	0–1	2–1	2–0	4–0
2	Italy	8	5	3	0	11	1	+10	18	Advance to second round	0–0	—	3–0	1–0	3–0
3	Poland	8	3	1	4	10	12	−2	10		0–2	0–0	—	4–1	2–1
4	Georgia	8	3	1	4	7	9	−2	10		0–2	0–0	3–0	—	2–0
5	Moldova	8	0	0	8	2	21	−19	0		0–3	1–3	0–3	0–1	—

== Matches ==
1 September 1996
18:00 UTC+3

Moldova	0–3	England
	Report	Barmby 24'; Gascoigne 26'; Shearer 61'

Republican Stadium, Chişinău
Attendance: 9,500
Referee: Ilkka Koho (Finland)

5 October 1996
21:15 UTC+3

Moldova	1–3	Italy
Curtianu 12'	Report	Ravanelli 8', 87'; Casiraghi 67'

Republican Stadium, Chişinău
Attendance: 4,085
Referee: Gerd Grabher (Austria)

9 October 1996
20:00 UTC+1

England	2–1	Poland
Shearer 25', 38'	Report	Citko 7'

Wembley, London
Attendance: 74,663
Referee: Hellmut Krug (Germany)
9 October 1996
20:30 UTC+2

Italy	1–0	Georgia
Ravanelli 43'	Report

Stadio Renato Curi, Perugia
Attendance: 14,012
Referee: Eric Blareau (Belgium)

9 November 1996
16:00 UTC+4

Georgia	0–2	England
	Report	Sheringham 15'; Ferdinand 37'

Boris Paichadze Stadium, Tbilisi
Attendance: 48,000
Referee: Jorge Monteiro Coroado (Portugal)
10 November 1996
20:15 UTC+2

Poland	2–1	Moldova
Bałuszyński 4'; K. Warzycha 77' (pen.)	Report	Cleşcenco 83' (pen.)

GKS Stadium, Katowice
Attendance: 8,000
Referee: Sotirios Vorgias (Greece)

12 February 1997
20:00 UTC

England	0–1	Italy
	Report	Zola 19'

Wembley, London
Attendance: 75,056
Referee: Sándor Puhl (Hungary)

29 March 1997
20:45 UTC+1

Italy	3–0	Moldova
Maldini 24'; Zola 45'; Vieri 50'	Report

Nereo Rocco Stadium, Trieste
Attendance: 17,677
Referee: Gilles Veissière (France)

2 April 1997
20:30 UTC+2

Poland	0–0	Italy
	Report

Silesian Stadium, Chorzów
Attendance: 32,000
Referee: Kim Milton Nielsen (Denmark)

30 April 1997
20:00 UTC+1

England	2–0	Georgia
Sheringham 42'; Shearer 90+1'	Report

Wembley, London
Attendance: 71,208
Referee: Rémi Harrel (France)
30 April 1997
20:30 UTC+2

Italy	3–0	Poland
Di Matteo 24'; Maldini 36'; R.Baggio 62'	Report

San Paolo, Naples
Attendance: 35,237
Referee: José María García-Aranda (Spain)

31 May 1997
20:30 UTC+2

Poland	0–2	England
	Report	Shearer 5'; Sheringham 90'

Silesian Stadium, Chorzów
Attendance: 25,000
Referee: Urs Meier (Switzerland)

7 June 1997
19:15 UTC+4

Georgia	2–0	Moldova
S. Arveladze 27'; Kinkladze 51'	Report

Central Stadium, Batumi
Attendance: 12,500
Referee: Charles Agius (Malta)

14 June 1997
20:30 UTC+2

Poland	4–1	Georgia
Ledwoń 32'; Trzeciak 34'; Bukalski 74' (pen.); K. Nowak 90'	Report	S. Arveladze 24'

GKS Stadium, Katowice
Attendance: 1,022
Referee: Günter Benkö (Austria)

10 September 1997
20:00 UTC+1

England	4–0	Moldova
Scholes 29'; Wright 46', 90'; Gascoigne 81'	Report

Wembley, London
Attendance: 74,102
Referee: Karl-Erik Nilsson (Sweden)
10 September 1997
21:00 UTC+4

Georgia	0–0	Italy
	Report

Boris Paichadze Stadium, Tbilisi
Attendance: 51,117
Referee: Rune Pedersen (Norway)

24 September 1997
19:00 UTC+3

Moldova	0–1	Georgia
	Report	Ketsbaia 10'

Republican Stadium, Chişinău
Attendance: 5,300
Referee: Dani Koren (Israel)

7 October 1997
19:00 UTC+3

Moldova	0–3	Poland
	Report (incorrect substitutions); Report	Juskowiak 23', 56', 60'

Republican Stadium, Chişinău
Attendance: 8,000
Referee: Metin Tokat (Turkey)

11 October 1997
20:45 UTC+2

Italy	0–0	England
	Report

Stadio Olimpico, Rome
Attendance: 65,892
Referee: Mario van der Ende (Netherlands)
11 October 1997
16:00 UTC+4

Georgia	3–0	Poland
A. Arveladze 55'; Tskhadadze 68'; Ketsbaia 74'	Report (incorrect substitutions); Report

Boris Paichadze Stadium, Tbilisi
Attendance: 15,000
Referee: Ľuboš Micheľ (Slovakia)

== Goalscorers ==
There were 45 goals scored in 20 matches, for an average of 2.25 goals per match.

5 goals

- (England) Alan Shearer

3 goals

- (England) Teddy Sheringham
- (Italy) Fabrizio Ravanelli
- (Poland) Andrzej Juskowiak

2 goals

- (England) Paul Gascoigne
- (England) Ian Wright
- (Georgia (country)) Shota Arveladze
- (Georgia (country)) Temuri Ketsbaia
- (Italy) Paolo Maldini
- (Italy) Gianfranco Zola

1 goal

- (England) Nick Barmby
- (England) Les Ferdinand
- (England) Paul Scholes
- (Georgia (country)) Archil Arveladze
- (Georgia (country)) Georgi Kinkladze
- (Georgia (country)) Kakhaber Tskhadadze
- (Italy) Roberto Baggio
- (Italy) Pierluigi Casiraghi
- (Italy) Roberto Di Matteo
- (Italy) Christian Vieri
- (Moldova) Serghei Cleşcenco
- (Moldova) Alexandru Curtianu
- (Poland) Henryk Bałuszyński
- (Poland) Krzysztof Bukalski
- (Poland) Marek Citko
- (Poland) Adam Ledwoń
- (Poland) Krzysztof Nowak
- (Poland) Mirosław Trzeciak
- (Poland) Krzysztof Warzycha
