= Karol Ihring =

Slovak football referee

- Full name: Karol Ihring
- Born: January 8, 1953 (age 73); Czechoslovakia, Kremnica

International
- Years: League
- 1991–1999: FIFA, UEFA

Karol Ihring (born 8 January 1953 in Kremnica), is a former Slovak football referee. A former youth player with ŠK Slovan Bratislava, he served as a FIFA referee for eight years from 1991.

At international level, Ihring presided over qualifiers for UEFA Euro 1996 and FIFA World Cup 1998. He refereed Liverpool's shock UEFA Cup defeat to Brøndby in October 1995. After hanging up his whistle, Ihring served as a director for FK Dukla Banská Bystrica from 2000 until 2007. Ihring also inspired his niece, Saša Ihringová, to take up officiating.
