= 1998 FIFA World Cup qualification – UEFA Group 7 =

Football tournament qualification stage

Group 7 consisted of five of the 50 teams entered into the European zone: (Note: Only 49 of the entered teams actually competed in the qualification tournament: France qualified for the World Cup automatically as host.) Belgium, Netherlands, San Marino, Turkey, and Wales. These five teams competed on a home-and-away basis for two of the 15 spots in the final tournament allocated to the European zone, with the group's winner and runner-up claiming those spots.

== Standings ==
Pos	Team	Pld	W	D	L	GF	GA	GD	Pts	Qualification	Netherlands national football team	Belgium national football team	Turkey national football team	Wales national football team	San Marino national football team
1	Netherlands	8	6	1	1	26	4	+22	19	Qualification to 1998 FIFA World Cup	—	3–1	0–0	7–1	4–0
2	Belgium	8	6	0	2	20	11	+9	18	Advance to second round	0–3	—	2–1	3–2	6–0
3	Turkey	8	4	2	2	21	9	+12	14		1–0	1–3	—	6–4	7–0
4	Wales	8	2	1	5	20	21	−1	7		1–3	1–2	0–0	—	6–0
5	San Marino	8	0	0	8	0	42	−42	0		0–6	0–3	0–5	0–5	—

== Matches ==
2 June 1996
20:30 UTC+2

San Marino	0–5	Wales
	Report	Melville 20'; Hughes 32', 43'; Giggs 50'; Pembridge 85'

Stadio Olimpico, Serravalle
Attendance: 1,613
Referee: Ľuboš Micheľ (Slovakia)

31 August 1996
20:30 UTC+2

Belgium	2–1	Turkey
Degryse 11'; Oliveira 37'	Report	Yalçin 56'

Roi Baudouin, Brussels
Attendance: 33,024
Referee: David Elleray (England)
31 August 1996
15:00 UTC+1

Wales	6–0	San Marino
Saunders 1', 74'; Hughes 25', 54'; Melville 34'; Robinson 45'	Report

Cardiff Arms Park, Cardiff
Attendance: 15,150
Referee: Alain Hamer (Luxembourg)

5 October 1996
19:00 UTC+1

Wales	1–3	Netherlands
Saunders 17'	Report	Hooijdonk 72', 75'; R. de Boer 79'

Cardiff Arms Park, Cardiff
Attendance: 34,560
Referee: Antonio López Nieto (Spain)
9 October 1996
20:30 UTC+2

San Marino	0–3	Belgium
	Report	Verheyen 11'; Nilis 20', 49'

Stadio Olimpico, Serravalle
Attendance: 1,353
Referee: Gevorg Hovhannisyan (Armenia)

9 November 1996
20:00 UTC+1

Netherlands	7–1	Wales
Bergkamp 21', 72', 78'; R. de Boer 32'; Jonk 33'; F. de Boer 43'; Cocu 60'	Report	Saunders 38'

Philips Stadion, Eindhoven
Attendance: 26,210
Referee: Vítor Melo Pereira (Portugal)
10 November 1996
20:00 UTC+2

Turkey	7–0	San Marino
Derelioğlu 25', 38', 51', 59'; Şükür 56', 63'; Sağlam 81'	Report

Ali Sami Yen Stadium, Istanbul
Attendance: 19,654
Referee: Vladimir Antonov (Moldova)

14 December 1996
20:00 UTC+1

Belgium	0–3	Netherlands
	Report	Bergkamp 24'; Seedorf 29'; Jonk 89' (pen.)

Roi Baudouin, Brussels
Attendance: 36,953
Referee: Pierluigi Pairetto (Italy)
14 December 1996
15:00 UTC

Wales	0–0	Turkey
	Report

Cardiff Arms Park, Cardiff
Attendance: 12,500
Referee: Aron Huzu (Romania)

29 March 1997
20:00 UTC+1

Netherlands	4–0	San Marino
Kluivert 44'; F. de Boer 58', 90'; Hooijdonk 82'	Report

Amsterdam ArenA, Amsterdam
Attendance: 47,000
Referee: Amit Klein (Israel)
29 March 1997
19:00 UTC

Wales	1–2	Belgium
Speed 60'	Report	Crasson 24'; Staelens 45'

Cardiff Arms Park, Cardiff
Attendance: 14,650
Referee: Christer Fällström (Sweden)

2 April 1997
20:30 UTC+3

Turkey	1–0	Netherlands
Şükür 53'	Report

Ataturk, Bursa
Attendance: 17,000
Referee: Manuel Díaz Vega (Spain)

30 April 1997
20:30 UTC+2

San Marino	0–6	Netherlands
	Report	Bergkamp 40', 88'; Winter 62'; Hooijdonk 69'; F. de Boer 73'; Bosman 83'

Stadio Olimpico, Serravalle
Attendance: 2,832
Referee: Andreas Georgiou (Cyprus)
30 April 1997
20:30 UTC+3

Turkey	1–3	Belgium
Derelioğlu 35'	Report	Oliveira 14', 32', 45'

Ali Sami Yen Stadium, Istanbul
Attendance: 21,350
Referee: Bernd Heynemann (Germany)

7 June 1997
20:00 UTC+2

Belgium	6–0	San Marino
Staelens 15', 84'; Van Meir 26'; E.Mpenza 27', 45'; Oliveira 33'	Report

Roi Baudouin, Brussels
Attendance: 24,000
Referee: Pavlin Jirku (Czech Republic)

20 August 1997
20:30 UTC+3

Turkey	6–4	Wales
Şükür 5', 37', 77', 82'; Akyüz 8'; Çetin 61'	Report	Blake 18'; Savage 20'; Saunders 31'; Melville 52'

Ali Sami Yen Stadium, Istanbul
Attendance: 9,710
Referee: Marek Kowalczyk (Poland)

6 September 1997
20:00 UTC+2

Netherlands	3–1	Belgium
Stam 32'; Kluivert 54'; Bergkamp 84'	Report	Staelens 67' (pen.)

De Kuip, Rotterdam
Attendance: 48,000
Referee: Kim Milton Nielsen (Denmark)
10 September 1997
20:30 UTC+2

San Marino	0–5	Turkey
	Report	Gobbi 27' (o.g.); Erdem 30', 81'; Şükür 74'; Mandirali 78'

Stadio Olimpico, Serravalle
Attendance: 947
Referee: Serhiy Tatulian (Ukraine)

11 October 1997
20:00 UTC+2

Netherlands	0–0	Turkey
	Report

Amsterdam ArenA, Amsterdam
Attendance: 48,000
Referee: Leif Sundell (Sweden)
11 October 1997
20:00 UTC+2

Belgium	3–2	Wales
Staelens 4' (pen.); Claessens 32'; Wilmots 39'	Report	Pembridge 53' (pen.); Giggs 66'

Roi Baudouin, Brussels
Attendance: 18,233
Referee: Vítor Melo Pereira (Portugal)

== Goalscorers ==
There were 87 goals scored in 20 matches, for an average of 4.35 goals per match.

8 goals

- (Turkey) Hakan Şükür

7 goals

- (Netherlands) Dennis Bergkamp

5 goals

- (Belgium) Luís Oliveira
- (Belgium) Lorenzo Staelens
- (Turkey) Oktay Derelioğlu
- (Wales) Dean Saunders

4 goals

- (Netherlands) Frank de Boer
- (Netherlands) Pierre van Hooijdonk
- (Wales) Mark Hughes

3 goals

- (Wales) Andy Melville

2 goals

- (Belgium) Émile Mpenza
- (Belgium) Luc Nilis
- (Netherlands) Ronald de Boer
- (Netherlands) Wim Jonk
- (Netherlands) Patrick Kluivert
- (Turkey) Arif Erdem
- (Wales) Ryan Giggs
- (Wales) Mark Pembridge

1 goal

- (Belgium) Gert Claessens
- (Belgium) Bertrand Crasson
- (Belgium) Marc Degryse
- (Belgium) Eric Van Meir
- (Belgium) Gert Verheyen
- (Belgium) Marc Wilmots
- (Netherlands) John Bosman
- (Netherlands) Phillip Cocu
- (Netherlands) Clarence Seedorf
- (Netherlands) Jaap Stam
- (Netherlands) Aron Winter
- (Turkey) Saffet Ayküz
- (Turkey) Oğuz Çetin
- (Turkey) Hami Mandirali
- (Turkey) Ertuğrul Sağlam
- (Turkey) Sergen Yalçın
- (Wales) Nathan Blake
- (Wales) John Robinson
- (Wales) Robbie Savage
- (Wales) Gary Speed

1 own goal

- (San Marino) Luca Gobbi (against Turkey)
