= 1998 FIFA World Cup qualification – UEFA Group 3 =

Football tournament qualification stage

Group 3 consisted of five of the 50 teams entered into the European zone: (Note: Only 49 of the entered teams actually competed in the qualification tournament: France qualified for the World Cup automatically as host.) Azerbaijan, Finland, Hungary, Norway, and Switzerland. These five teams competed on a home-and-away basis for two of the 15 spots in the final tournament allocated to the European zone, with the group's winner and runner-up claiming those spots.

== Standings ==
Pos	Team	Pld	W	D	L	GF	GA	GD	Pts	Qualification	Norway national football team	Hungary national football team	Finland national football team	Switzerland national football team	Azerbaijan national football team
1	Norway	8	6	2	0	21	2	+19	20	Qualification to 1998 FIFA World Cup	—	3–0	1–1	5–0	5–0
2	Hungary	8	3	3	2	10	8	+2	12	Advance to second round	1–1	—	1–0	1–1	3–1
3	Finland	8	3	2	3	11	12	−1	11		0–4	1–1	—	2–3	3–0
4	Switzerland	8	3	1	4	11	12	−1	10		0–1	1–0	1–2	—	5–0
5	Azerbaijan	8	1	0	7	3	22	−19	3		0–1	0–3	1–2	1–0	—

== Matches ==
2 June 1996
20:00 UTC+2

Norway	5–0	Azerbaijan
Solbakken 7', 46'; Solskjær 37', 89'; Strandli 59'	Report

Ullevaal, Oslo
Attendance: 14,012
Referee: Alan Snoddy (Northern Ireland)

31 August 1996
20:00 UTC+5

Azerbaijan	1–0	Switzerland
Rzayev 28'	Report

Tofik Bakhramov Stadium, Baku
Attendance: 15,000
Referee: Ryszard Wójcik (Poland)
1 September 1996
18:30 UTC+2

Hungary	1–0	Finland
Orosz 15'	Report

Nepstadion, Budapest
Attendance: 14,500
Referee: Hartmut Strampe (Germany)

6 October 1996
19:00 UTC+3

Finland	2–3	Switzerland
Sumiala 41' (pen.); Kolkka 77'	Report	Lombardo 14'; Sforza 34'; Yakin 54'

Olympiastadion, Helsinki
Attendance: 7,217
Referee: Gylfi Thor Orrason (Iceland)
9 October 1996
20:00 UTC+2

Norway	3–0	Hungary
Rekdal 83', 89', 90' (pen.)	Report

Ullevaal, Oslo
Attendance: 22,480
Referee: Hugh Dallas (Scotland)

10 November 1996
14:30 UTC+1

Switzerland	0–1	Norway
	Report	Leonhardsen 32'

Wankdorf Stadion, Bern
Attendance: 22,000
Referee: Manuel Díaz Vega (Spain)
10 November 1996
16:00 UTC+4

Azerbaijan	0–3	Hungary
	Report	Nyilas 42', 67' (pen.); Urbán 77'

Tofik Bakhramov Stadium, Baku
Attendance: 30,000
Referee: Dragutin Poljak (Croatia)

2 April 1997
20:00 UTC+5

Azerbaijan	1–2	Finland
Suleymanov 83' (pen.)	Report	Litmanen 26'; Paatelainen 64'

Tofik Bakhramov Stadium, Baku
Attendance: 19,000
Referee: Graham Poll (England)

30 April 1997
20:00 UTC+2

Norway	1–1	Finland
Solskjær 83'	Report	Sumiala 60'

Ullevaal, Oslo
Attendance: 22,782
Referee: Markus Merk (Germany)
30 April 1997
20:15 UTC+2

Switzerland	1–0	Hungary
Türkyilmaz 83'	Report

Hardturm, Zürich
Attendance: 17,300
Referee: Leif Sundell (Sweden)

8 June 1997
20:00 UTC+2

Hungary	1–1	Norway
Kovács 22'	Report	Rudi 9'

Nepstadion, Budapest
Attendance: 25,300
Referee: David Elleray (England)
8 June 1997
19:00 UTC+3

Finland	3–0	Azerbaijan
Vanhala 60'; Litmanen 65'; Sumiala 82'	Report

Olympiastadion, Helsinki
Attendance: 13,417
Referee: Alain Hamer (Luxembourg)

20 August 1997
19:00 UTC+3

Finland	0–4	Norway
	Report	Solbakken 9'; Rudi 12'; J.Flo 48'; T.A.Flo 84'

Olympiastadion, Helsinki
Attendance: 35,520
Referee: Vadim Zhuk (Belarus)
20 August 1997
18:30 UTC+2

Hungary	1–1	Switzerland
Klausz 52'	Report	Chapuisat 90+1'

Nepstadion, Budapest
Attendance: 40,000
Referee: Michel Piraux (Belgium)

6 September 1997
20:00 UTC+5

Azerbaijan	0–1	Norway
	Report	T.A.Flo 42'

Tofik Bakhramov Stadium, Baku
Attendance: 8,000
Referee: Günter Benkö (Austria)
6 September 1997
21:15 UTC+2

Switzerland	1–2	Finland
Kunz 90+1'	Report	Litmanen 16'; Sumiala 79'

Stade Olympique de la Pontaise, Lausanne
Attendance: 15,000
Referee: Stefano Braschi (Italy)

10 September 1997
20:00 UTC+2

Norway	5–0	Switzerland
Jakobsen 46'; Solbakken 51'; Eggen 65'; Østenstad 75'; T.A.Flo 85'	Report

Ullevaal, Oslo
Attendance: 22,603
Referee: Hellmut Krug (Germany)
10 September 1997
19:30 UTC+2

Hungary	3–1	Azerbaijan
Klausz 8'; Halmai 44'; Illés 89'	Report	Lychkin 71'

Nepstadion, Budapest
Attendance: 8,112
Referee: Atanas Uzunov (Bulgaria)

11 October 1997
19:00 UTC+3

Finland	1–1	Hungary
Sumiala 63'	Report	Moilanen 90+1' (o.g.)

Olympiastadion, Helsinki
Attendance: 31,617
Referee: Bernd Heynemann (Germany)
11 October 1997
20:15 UTC+2

Switzerland	5–0	Azerbaijan
Türkyilmaz 13', 23', 69' (pen.); Yakin 43'; Chapuisat 51'	Report

Hardturm, Zürich
Attendance: 7,600
Referee: John Rowbotham (Scotland)

== Goalscorers ==
There were 56 goals scored in 20 matches, for an average of 2.8 goals per match.

5 goals

- (Finland) Antti Sumiala

4 goals

- (Norway) Ståle Solbakken
- (Switzerland) Kubilay Türkyilmaz

3 goals

- (Finland) Jari Litmanen
- (Norway) Tore André Flo
- (Norway) Kjetil Rekdal
- (Norway) Ole Gunnar Solskjær

2 goals

- (Hungary) László Klausz
- (Hungary) Elek Nyilas
- (Norway) Petter Rudi
- (Switzerland) Stéphane Chapuisat
- (Switzerland) Murat Yakin

1 goal

- (Azerbaijan) Vyacheslav Lychkin
- (Azerbaijan) Vidadi Rzayev
- (Azerbaijan) Nazim Suleymanov
- (Finland) Joonas Kolkka
- (Finland) Mika-Matti Paatelainen
- (Finland) Jari Vanhala
- (Hungary) Gábor Halmai
- (Hungary) Béla Illés
- (Hungary) Zoltán Kovács
- (Hungary) Ferenc Orosz
- (Hungary) Flórián Urbán
- (Norway) Dan Eggen
- (Norway) Jostein Flo
- (Norway) Jahn Ivar Jakobsen
- (Norway) Øyvind Leonhardsen
- (Norway) Frank Strandli
- (Norway) Egil Østenstad
- (Switzerland) Adrian Kunz
- (Switzerland) Massimo Lombardo
- (Switzerland) Ciriaco Sforza

1 own goal

- (Finland) Teuvo Moilanen (against Hungary)
