= 1998 FIFA World Cup qualification – UEFA Group 4 =

Football tournament qualification stage

Group 4 consisted of six of the 50 teams entered into the European zone: (Note: Only 49 of the entered teams actually competed in the qualification tournament: France qualified for the World Cup automatically as host.) Austria, Belarus, Estonia, Latvia, Scotland and Sweden. These six teams competed on a home-and-away basis for two of the 15 spots in the final tournament allocated to the European zone, with the group's winner and runner-up claiming those spots.

== Standings ==
Pos	Team	Pld	W	D	L	GF	GA	GD	Pts	Qualification	Austria national football team	Scotland national football team	Sweden men's national football team	Latvia national football team	Estonia national football team	Belarus national football team
1	Austria	10	8	1	1	17	4	+13	25	Qualification to 1998 FIFA World Cup	—	0–0	1–0	2–1	2–0	4–0
2	Scotland	10	7	2	1	15	3	+12	23	Qualification to 1998 FIFA World Cup	2–0	—	1–0	2–0	2–0	4–1
3	Sweden	10	7	0	3	16	9	+7	21		0–1	2–1	—	1–0	1–0	5–1
4	Latvia	10	3	1	6	10	14	−4	10		1–3	0–2	1–2	—	1–0	2–0
5	Estonia	10	1	1	8	4	16	−12	4		0–3	0–0	2–3	1–3	—	1–0
6	Belarus	10	1	1	8	5	21	−16	4		0–1	0–1	1–2	1–1	1–0	—

== Matches ==
1 June 1996
18:30 UTC+2

Sweden	5–1	Belarus
K. Andersson 20', 62' (pen.); Dahlin 30'; P. Andersson 77'; Larsson 87'	Report	Byalkevich 75'

Råsunda Stadium, Stockholm
Attendance: 30,014
Referee: Rémi Harrel (France)

31 August 1996
20:30 UTC+2

Austria	0–0	Scotland
	Report

Ernst Happel Stadion, Vienna
Attendance: 27,600
Referee: Michel Piraux (Belgium)
31 August 1996
18:30 UTC+3

Belarus	1–0	Estonia
Makowski 35'	Report

Dinamo, Minsk
Attendance: 7,500
Referee: Sergei Khusainov (Russia)
1 September 1996
19:00 UTC+3

Latvia	1–2	Sweden
Rimkus 56'	Report	Dahlin 16'; K. Andersson 21'

Daugavas stadions, Riga
Attendance: 9,200
Referee: László Vágner (Hungary)

5 October 1996
19:00 UTC+3

Latvia	0–2	Scotland
	Report	Collins 18'; Jackson 80'

Daugavas stadions, Riga
Attendance: 9,500
Referee: Jiří Ulrich (Czech Republic)
5 October 1996
15:00 UTC+3

Estonia	1–0	Belarus
Hohlov-Simson 52'	Report

Kadriong, Tallinn
Attendance: 1,500
Referee: Richard O'Hanlon (Republic of Ireland)

9 October 1996
19:00 UTC+2

Sweden	0–1	Austria
	Report	Herzog 11'

Råsunda Stadium, Stockholm
Attendance: 36,859
Referee: Václav Krondl (Czech Republic)
9 October 1996
18:30 UTC+3

Belarus	1–1	Latvia
Makowski 78'	Report	Zemļinskis 16'

Dinamo, Minsk
Attendance: 7,300
Referee: Sergo Kvaratskhelia (Georgia)

9 November 1996
18:15 UTC+1

Austria	2–1	Latvia
Polster 43'; Herzog 73'	Report	Rimkus 44'

Ernst Happel Stadion, Vienna
Attendance: 15,700
Referee: Milan Mitrović (Slovenia)
10 November 1996
15:00 UTC

Scotland	1–0	Sweden
McGinlay 7'	Report

Ibrox, Glasgow
Attendance: 46,738
Referee: José María García-Aranda (Spain)

11 February 1997
20:00 UTC+1

Estonia	0–0	Scotland
	Report

Stade Louis II, Monaco
Attendance: 3,766
Referee: Miroslav Radoman (Yugoslavia)

This game was a replay of the original game that took place in Tallinn on 9 October where the Estonian team failed to show up.

29 March 1997
15:00 UTC

Scotland	2–0	Estonia
Boyd 25'; Meet 52' (o.g.)	Report

Rugby Park, Kilmarnock
Attendance: 17,996
Referee: Bernd Heynemann (Germany)

2 April 1997
20:00 UTC+1

Scotland	2–0	Austria
Gallacher 25', 78'	Report

Celtic Park, Glasgow
Attendance: 43,259
Referee: Nikolai Levnikov (Russia)

30 April 1997
20:00 UTC+2

Austria	2–0	Estonia
Vastić 48'; Stöger 87'	Report

Ernst Happel Stadion, Vienna
Attendance: 27,500
Referee: Armand Ancion (Belgium)
30 April 1997
19:30 UTC+2

Sweden	2–1	Scotland
K. Andersson 43', 63'	Report	Gallacher 83'

Ullevi Stadion, Gothenburg
Attendance: 40,302
Referee: Pierluigi Collina (Italy)
30 April 1997
17:00 UTC+3

Latvia	2–0	Belarus
Ševļakovs 36', 83'	Report

Daugavas stadions, Riga
Attendance: 4,200
Referee: Ilkka Koho (Finland)

18 May 1997
19:00 UTC+3

Estonia	1–3	Latvia
Zelinski 5'	Report	Babičevs 53'; Jelisejevs 80'; Lemsalu 87' (o.g.)

Kadriong, Tallinn
Attendance: 2,500
Referee: Darko Cvitkovic (Croatia)

8 June 1997
19:00 UTC+3

Latvia	1–3	Austria
Astafjevs 88'	Report	Heraf 55'; Polster 81'; Stöger 82'

Daugavas stadions, Riga
Attendance: 9,200
Referee: Dick Jol (Netherlands)
8 June 1997
17:00 UTC+3

Belarus	0–1	Scotland
	Report	McAllister 49' (pen.)

Dinamo, Minsk
Attendance: 12,000
Referee: Ahmet Çakar (Turkey)
8 June 1997
20:00 UTC+3

Estonia	2–3	Sweden
Oper 74'; Kristal 84'	Report	Dahlin 14'; Zetterberg 53' (pen.); K. Andersson 71'

Kadriorg, Tallinn
Attendance: 2,500
Referee: Ryszard Wójcik (Poland)

20 August 1997
18:30 UTC+3

Estonia	0–3	Austria
	Report	Polster 47', 69', 90'

Kariorg, Tallinn
Attendance: 2,200
Referee: Georgios Fassolis (Greece)
20 August 1997
20:30 UTC+3

Belarus	1–2	Sweden
Gurenko 38'	Report	K. Andersson 74'; Zetterberg 84'

Dinamo, Minsk
Attendance: 9,000
Referee: Dermot Gallagher (England)

6 September 1997
20:30 UTC+2

Austria	1–0	Sweden
Herzog 76'	Report

Ernst Happel Stadion, Vienna
Attendance: 48,500
Referee: Antonio López Nieto (Spain)
6 September 1997
20:30 UTC+3

Latvia	1–0	Estonia
Zemļinskis 87' (pen.)	Report

Daugavas stadions, Riga
Attendance: 2,500
Referee: Otar Guntadze (Georgia)
7 September 1997 (Note: The Scotland v Belarus match was moved from the original scheduled date of 6 September 1997 as it fell on the Funeral of Diana, Princess of Wales in London, England.)
14:00 UTC+1

Scotland	4–1	Belarus
Gallacher 7', 58'; Hopkin 54', 88'	Report	Kachuro 73' (pen.)

Pittodrie Stadium, Aberdeen
Attendance: 20,160
Referee: Mario van der Ende (Netherlands)

10 September 1997
19:00 UTC+3

Belarus	0–1	Austria
	Report	Pfeifenberger 50'

Dinamo, Minsk
Attendance: 7,000
Referee: Serge Muhmenthaler (Switzerland)
10 September 1997
19:00 UTC+2

Sweden	1–0	Latvia
Jonson 88'	Report

Råsunda Stadium, Stockholm
Attendance: 20,251
Referee: Markus Merk (Germany)

11 October 1997
16:00 UTC+2

Austria	4–0	Belarus
Polster 3', 16' (pen.); Stöger 6', 42'	Report

Ernst Happel Stadion, Vienna
Attendance: 48,500
Referee: Aron Huzu (Romania)
11 October 1997
15:00 UTC+1

Scotland	2–0	Latvia
Gallacher 43'; Durie 80'	Report

Celtic Park, Glasgow
Attendance: 47,613
Referee: Sándor Piller (Hungary)
11 October 1997
15:00 UTC+2

Sweden	1–0	Estonia
Zetterberg 25'	Report

Råsunda Stadium, Stockholm
Attendance: 18,702
Referee: Stefan Ormandzhiev (Bulgaria)

== Goalscorers ==
There were 67 goals scored in 30 matches, for an average of 2.23 goals per match.

7 goals

- (Austria) Toni Polster
- (Sweden) Kennet Andersson

6 goals

- (Scotland) Kevin Gallacher

4 goals

- (Austria) Peter Stöger

3 goals

- (Austria) Andreas Herzog
- (Sweden) Martin Dahlin
- (Sweden) Pär Zetterberg

2 goals

- (Belarus) Uladzimir Makowski
- (Latvia) Vits Rimkus
- (Latvia) Jurijs Ševļakovs
- (Latvia) Mihails Zemļinskis
- (Scotland) David Hopkin

1 goal

- (Austria) Andreas Heraf
- (Austria) Heimo Pfeifenberger
- (Austria) Ivica Vastić
- (Belarus) Valyantsin Byalkevich
- (Belarus) Sergei Gurenko
- (Belarus) Petr Kachuro
- (Estonia) Sergei Hohlov-Simson
- (Estonia) Marko Kristal
- (Estonia) Andres Oper
- (Estonia) Indrek Zelinski
- (Latvia) Vitālijs Astafjevs
- (Latvia) Vladimirs Babičevs
- (Latvia) Aleksandrs Jelisejevs
- (Scotland) Tom Boyd
- (Scotland) John Collins
- (Scotland) Gordon Durie
- (Scotland) Darren Jackson
- (Scotland) John McGinlay
- (Scotland) Gary McAllister
- (Sweden) Patrik Andersson
- (Sweden) Mattias Jonson
- (Sweden) Henrik Larsson

1 own goal

- (Estonia) Janek Meet (against Scotland)
- (Estonia) Marek Lemsalu (against Latvia)
