= 2002–03 Ferencvárosi TC season =

Ferencvárosi TC
2002–03 season
- Chairman: János Furulyás
- Manager: József Garami
- Stadium: Üllői úti stadion
- NB 1: Runners-up
- Hungarian Cup: Winner
- UEFA Cup: Third Qualifying round
- Top goalscorer: League: Attila Tököli (15); All: Attila Tököli (26)
- Highest home attendance: 16,000 vs Stuttgart (31 October 2002)
- Lowest home attendance: 5,063 vs Dunaferr (23 November 2002)

The 2002–03 season will be Ferencvárosi TC's101st competitive season, 101st consecutive season in the Borsodi Liga and 103rd year in existence as a football club.

== Transfers ==
=== Summer ===
In: Note: Flags indicate national team as defined under FIFA eligibility rules; some limited exceptions apply. Players may hold more than one non-FIFA nationality.

No.	Pos.	Nation	Player
1	GK	HUN	Milán Udvarácz (from Kispest-Honvéd)
8	FW	ROU	Bogdan Andone (from (Romania) Oțelul Galați)
10	FW	BRA	Leandro (from Haladás)
13	MF	HUN	Tamás Somorjai (loan return from Celldömölk)
14	MF	HUN	Tibor Szabó (from (Russia) Volgar Astrakhan)
19	DF	HUN	Zsolt Bognár (from Győr)
23	DF	HUN	János Hrutka (loan return from Vasas)
55	FW	HUN	Attila Tököli (from Dunaferr)
—	MF	HUN	Tibor Halgas (loan return from Celldömölk)
—	MF	HUN	Sándor Károlyi (from Győr)

Out: Note: Flags indicate national team as defined under FIFA eligibility rules; some limited exceptions apply. Players may hold more than one non-FIFA nationality.

No.	Pos.	Nation	Player
1	GK	HUN	Mihály Szerovay (to ESMTK)
7	MF	SVK	Attila Pinte (to (Greece) Panionios)
8	FW	HUN	Péter Horváth (to Dunaferr)
11	MF	HUN	Gábor Vén (to Diósgyőr)
12	FW	UKR	Serhiy Kuznetsov (loan to (Romania) Bihor Oradea)
16	FW	HUN	Ernő Kardos (to Győr)
25	GK	HUN	Gábor Németh (to Siófok)
27	DF	HUN	György Sallai (to Rákospalota)
28	FW	HUN	Zoltán Fülöp (to Siófok)

=== Winter ===
In: Note: Flags indicate national team as defined under FIFA eligibility rules; some limited exceptions apply. Players may hold more than one non-FIFA nationality.

No.	Pos.	Nation	Player
4	DF	HUN	György Kiss (from Dunaferr)
51	MF	HUN	János Zováth (from Dunaferr)
90	FW	HUN	Thomas Sowunmi (from Dunaferr)

Out: Note: Flags indicate national team as defined under FIFA eligibility rules; some limited exceptions apply. Players may hold more than one non-FIFA nationality.

No.	Pos.	Nation	Player
10	MF	HUN	Tibor Szabó (loan to Videoton)
15	MF	HUN	Csaba Földvári (to BKV Előre)
20	MF	HUN	Zalán Zombori (to Kispest-Honvéd)
23	DF	HUN	János Hrutka (to Kispest-Honvéd)
—	DF	HUN	Norbert Palásthy (loan to Fót)

== Nemzeti Bajnokság I ==
=== First stage ===
Pos	Team	Pld	W	D	L	GF	GA	GD	Pts	Qualification
1	Ferencváros	22	15	3	4	41	17	+24	48	Qualification for championship playoff
2	MTK Hungária	22	14	5	3	42	21	+21	47	Qualification for championship playoff
3	Újpest	22	12	4	6	45	29	+16	40	Qualification for championship playoff
4	Debrecen	22	10	9	3	44	30	+14	39	Qualification for championship playoff
5	Siófok	22	8	8	6	28	27	+1	32	Qualification for championship playoff

Source: rsssf.com

=== Second stage ===
Pos	Team	Pld	W	D	L	GF	GA	GD	Pts	Qualification
1	MTK Hungária (C)	32	20	6	6	59	34	+25	66	Qualification for Champions League second qualifying round
2	Ferencváros	32	19	7	6	50	24	+26	64	Qualification for UEFA Cup qualifying round
3	Debrecen	32	13	14	5	57	38	+19	53	Qualification for UEFA Cup qualifying round
4	Újpest	32	15	7	10	54	41	+13	52	
5	Siófok	32	12	11	9	46	44	+2	47	
6	Győr	32	9	9	14	41	50	−9	36	Qualification for Intertoto Cup first round

Source: rsssf.com
(C) Champions

=== Results summary ===
Overall								Home						Away					
Pld	W	D	L	GF	GA	GD	Pts	W	D	L	GF	GA	GD	W	D	L	GF	GA	GD
32	19	7	6	50	24	+26	64	11	2	3	28	10	+18	8	5	3	22	14	+8

Last updated: 31 May 2003.
Source: NB1

=== Results by round ===
Round	1	2	3	4	5	6	7	8	9	10	11	12	13	14	15	16	17	18	19	20	21	22	23	24	25	26	27	28	29	30	31	32
Ground	A	H	A	H	A	H	A	H	A	H	A	H	A	H	A	H	A	H	A	H	A	H	H	A	H	H	A	A	H	A	A	H
Result	W	W	W	W	D	L	L	D	W	W	W	W	W	L	W	W	W	W	L	W	D	W	W	L	W	W	D	D	L	D	W	D
Position	4	1	1	1	1	2	3	4	2	2	2	2	2	2	2	2	1	1	2	2	2	1	1	1	1	1	1	1	1	1	1	2

Updated to match(es) played on 31 May 2003. Source: Matches
A = Away; H = Home; W = Win; D = Draw; L = Loss

=== Matches ===
==== First stage ====
27 July 2002 1	Siófok	0 – 2	Ferencváros	Siófok
19:30 CEST		Report	Tököli 56'; Gera 68'	Stadium: Révész Géza utcai Stadion; Attendance: 10,230; Referee: Zsolt Szabó

3 August 2002 2	Ferencváros	4 – 0	Kispest-Honvéd	Budapest
18:30 CEST	Tököli 11'; Leandro 19'; Szkukalek 78'; Dragóner 83'	Report		Stadium: Üllői úti stadion Attendance: 7,942; Referee: Attila Hanacsek

10 August 2002 3	Békéscsaba	0 – 2	Ferencváros	Békéscsaba
17:00 CEST	Udvari (red card) 90'	Report	Gyepes 55'; Szili 90'	Stadium: Kórház utcai Stadion; Attendance: 15,000; Referee: Attila Juhos

18 August 2002 4	Ferencváros	2 – 0	Sopron	Budapest
19:30 CEST	Tököli 34'; Gyepes 68'	Report		Stadium: Üllői úti stadion Attendance: 8,178; Referee: Csaba Sápi

24 August 2002 5	Dunaferr	2 – 2	Ferencváros	Dunaújváros
17:00 CEST	Alex 27'; Éger 90' (pen.)	Report	Lipcsei 67'; Tököli 80'	Stadium: Dunaferr Arena; Attendance: 6,000; Referee: Attila Dubraviczky

1 September 2002 6	Ferencváros	0 – 1	MTK Budapest	Budapest
20:45 CEST	Dragóner (red card) 30'	Report	Zavadszky 27'; Jezdimirović (red card) 79'	Stadium: Üllői úti stadion Attendance: 8,276; Referee: Ferenc Bede

14 September 2002 7	Újpest	3 – 0	Ferencváros	Budapest
18:30 CEST	Kovács 61', 87'; Rósa 68'	Report		Stadium: Megyeri úti stadion Attendance: 5,019; Referee: Zsolt Szabó

23 September 2002 8	Ferencváros	0 – 0	Debrecen	Budapest
18:00 CEST		Report		Stadium: Üllői úti stadion Attendance: 5,118; Referee: Attila Juhos

27 September 2002 9	Győr	1 – 2	Ferencváros	Győr
19:00 CEST	Szanyó 90+1'	Report	Gera 46'; Szili 57'; Jović (red card) 90+1'	Stadium: Stadion ETO; Attendance: 5,000; Referee: Csaba Sápi

6 October 2002 10	Ferencváros	3 – 2	Zalaegerszeg	Budapest
18:00 CEST	Tököli 21', 90+3'; Gera 63'	Report	Vincze 58'; Kocsárdi 77'	Stadium: Üllői úti stadion Attendance: 6,657; Referee: Attila Dubraviczky

19 October 2002 11	Videoton	0 – 3	Ferencváros	Székesfehérvár
19:00 CEST		Report	Dragóner 59'; Lipcsei 65', 77' (pen.)	Stadium: Sóstói Stadion; Attendance: no spectators Referee: János Megyebíró

25 October 2002 12	Ferencváros	4 – 0	Siófok	Budapest
18:00 CEST	Lipcsei 25', 77'; Szili 87', 90'	Report		Stadium: Üllői úti stadion Attendance: 5,506; Referee: Zoltán Szarka

6 December 2002 13	Kispest-Honvéd	0 – 3	Ferencváros	Budapest
19:00 CET	Hercegfalvi 66'	Report	Lipcsei 62'; Kriston 65'	Stadium: Bozsik József Stadion; Attendance: 5,000; Referee: Attila Hanacsek

8 November 2002 14	Ferencváros	0 – 1	Békéscsaba	Budapest
18:00 CET		Report	Keresztúri 72'	Stadium: Üllői úti stadion Attendance: 6,000; Referee: Attila Hajdó

16 November 2002 15	Sopron	1 – 3	Ferencváros	Sopron
13:00 CET	Bausz 76'	Report	Tököli 10'; Gera 31'; Kriston 72'	Stadium: Káposztás utcai Stadion; Attendance: 4,500; Referee: Attila Juhos

23 November 2002 16	Ferencváros	3 – 0	Dunaferr	Budapest
18:00 CET	Tököli 70', 90+2'; Lipcsei 90+1'	Report	Zováth (red card) 84'	Stadium: Üllői úti stadion Attendance: 5,063; Referee: János Makai

1 December 2002 17	MTK Budapest	0 – 1	Ferencváros	Budapest
17:00 CET	Komlósi (red card) 61'	Report	Gera 14'	Stadium: Hidegkuti Nándor Stadion; Attendance: 5,230; Referee: Ferenc Bede

8 March 2003 18	Ferencváros	1 – 0	Újpest	Budapest
18:00 CET	Tököli 88'	Report		Stadium: Üllői úti stadion Attendance: 13,042; Referee: Attila Ábrahám

12 March 2003 19	Debrecen	2 – 0	Ferencváros	Debrecen
18:00 CET	Ilie 32'; Éger 81' (pen.)	Report		Stadium: Oláh Gábor utcai Stadion; Attendance: 6,000; Referee: Viktor Kassai

16 March 2003 20	Ferencváros	5 – 2	Győr	Budapest
18:00 CET	Tököli 16', 66'; Bognár 40'; Leandro 48'; Keller 82'	Report	Bajevski 45'; Szanyó 47'	Stadium: Üllői úti stadion Attendance: 6,170; Referee: Béla Kiss

22 March 2003 21	Zalaegerszeg	1 – 1	Ferencváros	Zalaegerszeg
15:00 CET	Gyánó 90+2'	Report	Lipcsei 83'	Stadium: ZTE Arena; Attendance: 11,000; Referee: Zsolt Szabó

5 April 2003 22	Ferencváros	1 – 0	Videoton	Budapest
18:00 CEST	Kriston 33'	Report		Stadium: Üllői úti stadion Attendance: 6,262; Referee: Attila Ábrahám

12 April 2003 23	Ferencváros	2 – 1	MTK Budapest	Budapest
18:00 CEST	Leandro 16'; Bognár (red card) 54'; Lipcsei 65' (pen.)	Report	Illés 36'	Stadium: Üllői úti stadion Attendance: 7,354; Referee: Attila Hanacsek

19 April 2003 24	Siófok	2 – 1	Ferencváros	Siófok
17:00 CEST	Schwarcz 18'; Fülöp 88' (pen.)	Report	Leandro 50'	Stadium: Révész Géza utcai Stadion; Attendance: 8,000; Referee: Zoltán Szarka

23 April 2003 25	Ferencváros	2 – 1	Újpest	Budapest
18:00 CET	Gera 76'; Jović 86'	Report	Tokody 73'; Németh (red card) 84'	Stadium: Üllői úti stadion Attendance: 8,520; Referee: János Megyebíró

26 April 2003 26	Ferencváros	1 – 0	Győr	Budapest
19:00 CET	Tököli 13'	Report		Stadium: Üllői úti stadion Attendance: 7,246; Referee: Tamás Arany

3 May 2003 27	Debrecen	1 – 1	Ferencváros	Debrecen
18:00 CEST	Șumudică 69'	Report	Flávio Pim 7' (o.g.)	Stadium: Oláh Gábor utcai Stadion; Attendance: 6,000; Referee: János Makai

10 May 2003 28	MTK Budapest	0 – 0	Ferencváros	Budapest
18:00 CEST		Report	Vukmir (red card) 21'	Stadium: Hidegkuti Nándor Stadion; Attendance: 5,000; Referee: Viktor Kassai

14 May 2003 29	Ferencváros	0 – 2	Siófok	Budapest
19:00 CET		Report	Csordás 51'; Fülöp 68'	Stadium: Üllői úti stadion Attendance: 5,975; Referee: Ferenc Bede

17 May 2003 30	Újpest	0 – 0	Ferencváros	Budapest
15:00 CEST		Report		Stadium: Megyeri úti stadion Attendance: 4,785; Referee: János Makai

24 May 2003 31	Győr	0 – 2	Ferencváros	Győr
18:00 CEST		Report	Tököli 8', 12'	Stadium: Stadion ETO; Attendance: 5,000; Referee: Ferenc Bede

30 May 2003 32	Ferencváros	0 – 0	Debrecen	Budapest
18:00 CET		Report		Stadium: Üllői úti stadion Attendance: 13,622; Referee: János Megyebíró

== Hungarian Cup ==
5 November 2002 Round of 32	Pápa	2 – 3 (a.e.t.)	Ferencváros	Pápa
CET	Lászka 67'; Kvasz 120'		Tököli 87', 110'; Jović 100'	Stadium: Perutz Stadion; Attendance: 3,300; Referee: János Makai

26 November 2002 Round of 16	Kaposvár	1 – 1 (a.e.t.) (1 – 4 p)	Ferencváros	Kaposvár
CET	Rajczi 39'		Jović 86'	Stadium: Rákóczi Stadion; Attendance: 3,500; Referee: Viktor Kassai

4 March 2003 Quarter-final	Ferencváros	2 – 0	Zalaegerszeg	Budapest
CET	Tököli 77'; Penksa 90+1'			Stadium: Üllői úti stadion Attendance: 4,627; Referee: Zoltán Szarka

16 April 2003 Semi-final	BKV Előre	1 – 2	Ferencváros	Budapest
CEST	Hegedűs 27'	Report	Tököli 18', 81'	Stadium: Hidegkuti Nándor Stadion; Attendance: 2,000; Referee: Attila Dubraviczky

6 May 2003 Final	Ferencváros	2 – 1	Debrecen	Budapest
17:30 CEST	Tököli 68', 78'	Report	Szűcs 43' (o.g.)	Stadium: Puskás Ferenc Stadion; Attendance: 9,244; Referee: János Megyebíró

== UEFA Cup ==
=== Qualifying round ===
15 August 2002 Q Leg 1	Ferencváros	4 – 0	(Cyprus) AEL Limassol	Budapest, Hungary
CEST	Tököli 10', 11'; Gera 55'; Szkukalek 58'	Report		Stadium: Üllői úti stadion Attendance: 11,000; Referee: (Bulgaria) Anton Guenov

29 August 2002 Q Leg 2	AEL Limassol (Cyprus)	2 – 1 (2 – 5 agg.)	Ferencváros	Limassol, Cyprus
CEST	Kyriacou 29'; Sebők 86'	Report	Lipcsei 90'	Stadium: Tsirion Stadium; Attendance: 2,000; Referee: (North Macedonia) Saso Lazarevski

19 September 2002 R1 Leg 1	Ferencváros	4 – 0	(Turkey) Kocaelispor	Budapest, Hungary
CEST	Tököli 10', 90'; Lipcsei 30'; Dragóner 76'	Report		Stadium: Üllői úti stadion Attendance: 6,176; Referee: (Russia) Valentin Ivanov

3 October 2002 R1 Leg 2	Kocaelispor (Turkey)	0 – 1 (0 – 5 agg.)	Ferencváros	İzmit, Turkey
CEST		Report	Lipcsei 30'	Stadium: İzmit Stadium; Attendance: 4,000; Referee: (Portugal) Paulo Costa

31 October 2002 R2 Leg 1	Ferencváros	0 – 0	(Germany) Stuttgart	Budapest, Hungary
CEST		Report		Stadium: Üllői úti stadion Attendance: 16,000; Referee: (Finland) Mikko Vuorela

12 November 2002 R2 Leg 2	Stuttgart (Germany)	2 – 0 (2 – 0 agg.)	Ferencváros	Stuttgart, Germany
CEST	Amanatidis 63'; Meira 90' (pen.)	Report		Stadium: Gottlieb-Daimler-Stadion; Attendance: 15,000; Referee: (Cyprus) Costas Kapitanis

== Statistics ==
=== Appearances and goals ===
Last updated on 31 May 2003.

No.	Pos	Nat	Player	Total		Nemzeti Bajnokság I		Hungarian Cup		UEFA Cup	
No.	Pos	Nat	Player	Apps	Goals	Apps	Goals	Apps	Goals	Apps	Goals
1	GK	(Hungary) HUN	Milán Udvarácz	1	-1	1	-1	0	0	0	0
5	MF	(Slovakia) SVK	Igor Szkukalek	36	2	26	1	4	0	6	1
6	MF	(Hungary) HUN	Péter Lipcsei	42	12	31	9	5	0	6	3
8	FW	(Romania) ROU	Bogdan Andone	10	0	7	0	1	0	2	0
9	FW	(Hungary) HUN	Attila Szili	27	4	19	4	2	0	6	0
10	FW	(Brazil) BRA	Leandro	39	4	29	4	5	0	5	0
13	MF	(Hungary) HUN	Tamás Somorjai	3	0	3	0	0	0	0	0
14	MF	(Hungary) HUN	József Keller	12	1	10	1	2	0	0	0
16	FW	(Serbia and Montenegro) SCG	Aleksandar Jović	29	3	23	1	3	2	3	0
18	DF	(Romania) ROU	Marius Cheregi	5	0	4	0	0	0	1	0
19	DF	(Hungary) HUN	Zsolt Bognár	12	1	9	1	1	0	2	0
21	DF	(Serbia and Montenegro) SCG	Dragan Vukmir	40	0	29	0	5	0	6	0
22	GK	(Hungary) HUN	Lajos Szűcs	42	-32	31	-23	5	-5	6	-4
24	DF	(Hungary) HUN	Gábor Gyepes	25	2	17	2	2	0	6	0
26	DF	(Hungary) HUN	Attila Dragóner	34	3	24	2	4	0	6	1
27	MF	(Hungary) HUN	Attila Kriston	38	3	29	3	4	0	5	0
30	MF	(Hungary) HUN	Zoltán Gera	35	7	26	6	3	0	6	1
51	MF	(Hungary) HUN	János Zováth	14	0	11	0	3	0	0	0
53	MF	(Slovenia) SVN	Adem Kapič	35	0	24	0	5	0	6	0
55	FW	(Hungary) HUN	Attila Tököli	41	26	30	15	5	7	6	4
78	DF	(Hungary) HUN	Zoltán Balog	25	0	19	0	4	0	2	0
90	FW	(Hungary) HUN	Thomas Sowunmi	5	0	3	0	2	0	0	0
99	FW	(Slovakia) SVK	Marek Penksa	20	1	14	0	5	1	1	0

=== Top scorers ===
Includes all competitive matches. The list is sorted by shirt number when total goals are equal.

Last updated on 31 May 2003.

Position	Nation	Number	Name	Nemzeti Bajnokság I	Hungarian Cup	UEFA Cup	Total
1	(Hungary)	55	Attila Tököli	15	7	4	26
2	(Hungary)	6	Péter Lipcsei	9	0	3	12
3	(Hungary)	30	Zoltán Gera	6	0	1	7
4	(Hungary)	9	Attila Szili	4	0	0	4
5	(Brazil)	10	Leandro	4	0	0	4
6	(Hungary)	27	Attila Kriston	3	0	0	3
7	(Serbia and Montenegro)	16	Aleksandar Jović	1	2	0	3
8	(Slovakia)	5	Igor Szkukalek	1	0	1	2
9	(Hungary)	26	Attila Dragóner	1	0	1	2
10	(Hungary)	24	Gábor Gyepes	2	0	0	2
11	(Hungary)	26	Attila Dragóner	1	0	0	1
12	(Hungary)	19	Zsolt Bognár	1	0	0	1
13	(Hungary)	14	József Keller	1	0	0	1
14	(Slovakia)	99	Marek Penksa	0	1	0	1
/	/	/	Own Goals	1	0	0	1
			TOTALS	50	10	10	70

=== Disciplinary record ===
Includes all competitive matches. Players with 1 card or more included only.

Last updated on 31 May 2003.

Position	Nation	Number	Name	Nemzeti Bajnokság I		Hungarian Cup		UEFA Cup		Total (Hu Total)	
Position	Nation	Number	Name	Booked	Sent off (straight red)	Booked	Sent off (straight red)	Booked	Sent off (straight red)	Booked	Sent off (straight red)
MF	(Slovakia)	5	Igor Szkukalek	1	0	0	0	1	0	2 (1)	0 (0)
MF	(Hungary)	6	Péter Lipcsei	5	0	0	0	0	1	5 (5)	1 (0)
FW	(Romania)	8	Bogdan Andone	1	0	0	0	0	0	1 (1)	0 (0)
FW	(Hungary)	9	Attila Szili	0	0	0	0	2	0	2 (0)	0 (0)
FW	(Brazil)	10	Leandro	3	0	0	0	4	0	7 (3)	0 (0)
MF	(Hungary)	14	József Keller	1	0	0	0	0	0	1 (1)	0 (0)
FW	(Serbia and Montenegro)	16	Aleksandar Jović	0	1	1	0	0	0	1 (0)	1 (1)
DF	(Romania)	18	Marius Cheregi	1	0	0	0	0	0	1 (1)	0 (0)
DF	(Hungary)	19	Zsolt Bognár	1	1	0	0	1	0	2 (1)	1 (1)
DF	(Serbia and Montenegro)	21	Dragan Vukmir	5	1	1	0	1	0	7 (5)	1 (1)
GK	(Hungary)	22	Lajos Szűcs	2	0	0	0	0	0	2 (2)	0 (0)
DF	(Hungary)	24	Gábor Gyepes	1	0	1	0	2	0	4 (1)	0 (0)
DF	(Hungary)	26	Attila Dragóner	2	1	3	0	1	0	6 (2)	1 (1)
MF	(Hungary)	27	Attila Kriston	6	0	1	0	3	0	10 (6)	0 (0)
MF	(Hungary)	30	Zoltán Gera	5	0	0	0	1	0	6 (5)	0 (0)
MF	(Hungary)	51	János Zováth	1	0	0	0	0	0	1 (1)	0 (0)
MF	(Slovenia)	53	Adem Kapič	7	0	0	0	1	0	8 (7)	0 (0)
FW	(Hungary)	55	Attila Tököli	4	0	1	0	1	0	6 (4)	0 (0)
DF	(Hungary)	78	Zoltán Balog	1	0	1	0	0	0	2 (1)	0 (0)
FW	(Slovakia)	99	Marek Penksa	1	0	0	0	0	0	1 (1)	0 (0)
			TOTALS	48	4	9	0	18	1	75 (50)	5 (4)

=== Overall ===
Games played	43 (32 Nemzeti Bajnokság I, 5 Hungarian Cup and 6 UEFA Cup)
Games won	26 (19 Nemzeti Bajnokság I, 4 Hungarian Cup and 3 UEFA Cup)
Games drawn	9 (7 Nemzeti Bajnokság I, 1 Hungarian Cup and 1 UEFA Cup)
Games lost	8 (6 Nemzeti Bajnokság I, 0 Hungarian Cup and 2 UEFA Cup)
Goals scored	70
Goals conceded	33
Goal difference	+37
Yellow cards	75
Red cards	5
Worst discipline	(Hungary) Attila Kriston (10 (yellow card) , 0 (red card) )
Best result	4–0 (H) v Kispest-Honvéd - (Nemzeti Bajnokság I) - 3-8-2002
Best result	4–0 (H) v AEL Limassol - (UEFA Cup) - 15-8-2002
Best result	4–0 (H) v Kocaelispor - (UEFA Cup) - 19-9-2002
Best result	4–0 (H) v Siófok - (Nemzeti Bajnokság I) - 25-10-2002
Worst result	0–3 (A) v Újpest - (Nemzeti Bajnokság I) - 14-9-2002
Most appearances	(Hungary) Lajos Szűcs (42 appearances)
Most appearances	(Hungary) Péter Lipcsei (42 appearances)
Top scorer	(Hungary) Attila Tököli (26 goals)
Points	87/129 (67.44%)

Last updated: 31 May 2003
