= 2001–02 Ferencvárosi TC season =

Ferencvárosi TC
2001–02 season
- Chairman: János Furulyás
- Manager: János Csank (until 10 December 2001); József Garami
- Stadium: Üllői úti stadion
- NB 1: Runners-up
- Hungarian Cup: Round of 32
- UEFA CL: Second qualifying round
- Top goalscorer: League: Aleksandar Jović (11); All: Aleksandar Jović (11)
- Highest home attendance: 15,627 vs Újpest (16 March 2002)
- Lowest home attendance: 3,000 vs MTK Budapest (5 December 2001)

The 2001–02 season will be Ferencvárosi TC's100th competitive season, 100th consecutive season in the OTP Bank Liga and 102nd year in existence as a football club.

== Transfers ==
=== Summer ===
In: Note: Flags indicate national team as defined under FIFA eligibility rules; some limited exceptions apply. Players may hold more than one non-FIFA nationality.

No.	Pos.	Nation	Player
5	MF	SVK	Igor Szkukalek (from (Czech Republic) Drnovice)
10	MF	HUN	Tibor Szabó (from Kispest-Honvéd)
12	FW	UKR	Serhiy Kuznetsov (from (Finland) Jokerit)
13	FW	SVK	Tibor Jančula (from (Slovakia) Slovan Bratislava)
16	FW	YUG	Aleksandar Jović (from (Germany) Carl Zeiss Jena)
20	MF	HUN	Zalán Zombori (from Videoton)

Out: Note: Flags indicate national team as defined under FIFA eligibility rules; some limited exceptions apply. Players may hold more than one non-FIFA nationality.

No.	Pos.	Nation	Player
3	DF	HUN	Pál Lakos (to Győr)
5	DF	HUN	Mihály Szűcs (to Tatabánya)
20	MF	HUN	Ákos Csiszár (to Sopron)
21	FW	HUN	Mihály Tóth (to Sopron)

=== Winter ===
In: Note: Flags indicate national team as defined under FIFA eligibility rules; some limited exceptions apply. Players may hold more than one non-FIFA nationality.

No.	Pos.	Nation	Player
9	MF	HUN	Attila Szili (loan from Vasas)
21	DF	YUG	Dragan Vukmir (from (Federal Republic of Yugoslavia) Dinamo Pančevo)
53	MF	SVN	Adem Kapič (from (Germany) Stuttgarter Kickers)
99	MF	SVK	Marek Penksa (from Dunaferr)

Out: Note: Flags indicate national team as defined under FIFA eligibility rules; some limited exceptions apply. Players may hold more than one non-FIFA nationality.

No.	Pos.	Nation	Player
4	MF	HUN	Norbert Nagy (to Tatabánya)
10	MF	HUN	Tibor Szabó (to (Russia) Volgar Astrakhan)
12	FW	UKR	Serhiy Kuznetsov (loan to ESMTK)
13	FW	SVK	Tibor Jančula (sucked)
15	MF	HUN	Csaba Földvári (loan to ESMTK)
16	FW	HUN	Ernő Kardos (loan to ESMTK)
17	DF	YUG	Dragan Crnomarković (loan to Pápa)
22	GK	HUN	János Vámos (to Siófok)
23	DF	HUN	János Hrutka (loan to Vasas)
24	MF	HUN	Balázs Lászka (loan to Kispest-Honvéd)
28	FW	HUN	Zoltán Fülöp (loan to ESMTK)
31	MF	HUN	Zoltán Varga (loan to ESMTK)

== Nemzeti Bajnokság I ==
=== First stage ===
Pos	Team	Pld	W	D	L	GF	GA	GD	Pts	Qualification
1	MTK Hungária	33	20	4	9	56	34	+22	64	Qualification for championship playoff
2	Zalaegerszeg	33	18	7	8	65	40	+25	61	Qualification for championship playoff
3	Ferencváros	33	18	5	10	58	34	+24	59	Qualification for championship playoff
4	Dunaferr (Note: 6 points deducted for not paying a transfer fee)	33	15	8	10	62	38	+24	47	Qualification for championship playoff
5	Videoton	33	12	10	11	45	47	−2	46	Qualification for championship playoff

Source: rsssf.com

=== Second stage ===
Pos	Team	Pld	W	D	L	GF	GA	GD	Pts	Qualification
1	Zalaegerszeg (C)	38	21	8	9	76	47	+29	71	Qualification for Champions League second qualifying round
2	Ferencváros	38	21	6	11	66	39	+27	69	Qualification for UEFA Cup qualifying round
3	MTK Hungária	38	21	4	13	62	47	+15	67	
4	Dunaferr	38	17	8	13	71	47	+24	59	
5	Videoton	38	15	10	13	56	53	+3	55	
6	Újpest	38	14	8	16	65	69	−4	50	Qualification for UEFA Cup qualifying round (Note: Újpest FC won the 2001–02 Hungarian Cup and thereby qualified for the qualifying round of the UEFA Cup.)

Source: rsssf.com
(C) Champions

=== Results summary ===
Overall								Home						Away					
Pld	W	D	L	GF	GA	GD	Pts	W	D	L	GF	GA	GD	W	D	L	GF	GA	GD
38	21	6	11	66	39	+27	69	12	1	6	38	18	+20	9	5	5	28	21	+7

Last updated: 25 May 2002.
Source: NB1

=== Results by round ===
Round	1	2	3	4	5	6	7	8	9	10	11	12	13	14	15	16	17	18	19	20	21	22	23	24	25	26	27	28	29	30	31	32	33	34	35	36	37	38
Ground	H	A	H	A	H	A	H	H	A	H	A	A	H	A	H	A	H	A	A	H	A	H	H	A	H	A	H	A	H	H	A	H	A	H	A	A	A	H
Result	L	L	W	W	W	W	W	L	W	W	L	L	L	D	D	D	L	W	W	W	D	L	W	W	W	L	W	W	W	L	D	W	W	W	W	L	D	W
Position	9	10	7	6	5	3	3	3	2	2	2	3	5	4	4	5	6	5	5	4	4	5	4	3	3	3	3	3	3	3	3	3	3	3	2	3	2	2

Updated to match(es) played on 25 May 2002. Source: Matches
A = Away; H = Home; W = Win; D = Draw; L = Loss

=== Matches ===
==== First stage ====
14 July 2001 1	Ferencváros	0 – 1	Zalaegerszeg	Budapest
19:45 CEST	Dragóner (red card) 38'	Report	Egressy 33'	Stadium: Üllői úti stadion Attendance: 8,022; Referee: Zsolt Szabó

21 July 2001 2	Kispest-Honvéd	1 – 0	Ferencváros	Budapest
16:45 CEST	Faragó 70' (pen.)	Report		Stadium: Bozsik Stadion; Attendance: 3,000; Referee: Attila Juhos

28 July 2001 3	Ferencváros	2 – 1	Újpest	Budapest
20:45 CEST	Korolovszky 6' (o.g.); Vén 72'	Report	Tokody 50'	Stadium: Üllői úti stadion Attendance: 8,644; Referee: János Megyebíró

5 August 2001 4	Sopron	1 – 2	Ferencváros	Sopron
17:15 CEST	Somogyi 25' (pen.)	Report	Hrutka 32'; Kriston 59'	Stadium: Káposztás utcai Stadion; Attendance: 4,000; Referee: Ferenc Bede

10 August 2001 5	Ferencváros	4 – 0	Videoton	Budapest
19:45 CEST	Hrutka 49'; Jančula 59'; Szűcs 64' (pen.); Gera 70'	Report		Stadium: Üllői úti stadion Attendance: 7,211; Referee: József Bukovics

18 August 2001 6	Dunaferr	0 – 1	Ferencváros	Dunaújváros
16:45 CEST		Report	Hrutka 57'	Stadium: Dunaferr Arena; Attendance: 4,500; Referee: Attila Hanacsek

24 August 2001 7	Ferencváros	3 – 1	Haladás	Budapest
18:15 CEST	Pinte 10'; Gera 60'; Jović 84'	Report	Preisinger 71'; Nagy (red card) 80'	Stadium: Üllői úti stadion Attendance: 7,449; Referee: Béla Kiss

8 September 2001 8	Ferencváros	0 – 1	Debrecen	Budapest
16:45 CEST	Cheregi (red card) 90'	Report	Kuttor 73'	Stadium: Üllői úti stadion Attendance: 6,202; Referee: Attila Juhos

14 September 2001 9	Vasas	1 – 3	Ferencváros	Budapest
17:30 CEST	Gyánó 61'	Report	Jović 55'; Horváth 86' (pen.), 89'	Stadium: Illovszky Rudolf Stadion; Attendance: 6,000; Referee: János Megyebíró

22 September 2001 10	Ferencváros	3 – 1	Győr	Budapest
17:00 CEST	Horváth 6', 38' (pen.); Lipcsei 45'	Report	Oross 83'	Stadium: Üllői úti stadion Attendance: 6,177; Referee: János Makai

30 September 2001 11	MTK Budapest	3 – 1	Ferencváros	Budapest
18:00 CEST	Zavadszky 26'; Smiljanić 78'; Branežac 82'	Report	Hrutka 50'	Stadium: Hungária körúti stadion Attendance: 7,000; Referee: Zsolt Szabó

13 October 2001 12	Zalaegerszeg	2 – 0	Ferencváros	Zalaegerszeg
16:30 CEST	Nagy 47'; Kenesei 72'	Report	Szűcs (red card) 80'	Stadium: ZTE Arena; Attendance: 8,500; Referee: Attila Hanacsek

21 October 2001 13	Ferencváros	0 – 2	Kispest-Honvéd	Budapest
18:00 CEST		Report	Piroska 30', 78'	Stadium: Üllői úti stadion Attendance: 7,480; Referee: Viktor Kassai

24 October 2001 14	Újpest	2 – 2	Ferencváros	Budapest
17:15 CEST	Erős 71'; Poljaković 84'	Report	Dragóner 73'; Vén 79'	Stadium: Megyeri úti stadion Attendance: 5,000; Referee: Attila Juhos

28 October 2001 15	Ferencváros	3 – 3	Sopron	Budapest
18:00 CET	Jović 54'; Dragóner 55'; Zombori 62'	Report	Tóth 10'; Nagy 16'; Csiszár 75' (pen.)	Stadium: Üllői úti stadion Attendance: 4,000; Referee: Csaba Sápi

3 November 2001 16	Videoton	2 – 2	Ferencváros	Székesfehérvár
16:30 CET	Terjék 5'; Komódi 44' (pen.)	Report	Zombori 26'; Lipcsei 67'	Stadium: Sóstói Stadion; Attendance: 8,500; Referee: János Megyebíró

9 November 2001 17	Ferencváros	0 – 3	Dunaferr	Budapest
18:00 CET		Report	Sowunmi 11', 40'; Penksa 76'	Stadium: Üllői úti stadion Attendance: 4,067; Referee: Attila Dubraviczky

17 November 2001 18	Haladás	1 – 3	Ferencváros	Szombathely
16:30 CET	Leandro 57' (pen.)	Report	Gyepes 16'; Jović 90', 90+1'	Stadium: Rohonci úti Stadion; Attendance: 8,000; Referee: Attila Ábrahám

20 November 2001 19	Debrecen	0 – 1	Ferencváros	Debrecen
18:00 CET		Report	Gyepes 34'	Stadium: Oláh Gábor utcai Stadion; Attendance: 6,000; Referee: Zsolt Szabó

24 November 2001 20	Ferencváros	2 – 0	Vasas	Budapest
16:30 CET	Dragóner 34'; Jović 53'	Report		Stadium: Üllői úti stadion Attendance: 3,500; Referee: Ferenc Bede

2 December 2001 21	Győr	1 – 1	Ferencváros	Győr
18:00 CET	Fülöp 49'	Report	Nichenko 20'; Szanyó (red card) 59'	Stadium: ETO Park; Attendance: 4,000; Referee: Viktor Kassai

5 December 2001 22	Ferencváros	1 – 3	MTK Budapest	Budapest
17:15 CET	Fülöp (red card) 41'; Lipcsei 64' (pen.)	Report	Illés 39', 45'; Ferenczi 77'	Stadium: Üllői úti stadion Attendance: 3,000; Referee: Attila Juhos

1 March 2002 23	Ferencváros	2 – 0	Zalaegerszeg	Budapest
18:00 CET	Penksa 20'; Pinte 49'; Vukmir (red card) 69'	Report		Stadium: Üllői úti stadion Attendance: 8,457; Referee: Zsolt Szabó

8 March 2002 24	Kispest-Honvéd	0 – 4	Ferencváros	Budapest
18:00 CET	Borgulya (red card) 52'	Report	Gera 7', 47'; Penksa 43'; Kriston (red card) 85'; Pinte 87'	Stadium: Bozsik Stadion; Attendance: 5,000; Referee: Attila Juhos

16 March 2002 25	Ferencváros	2 – 0	Újpest	Budapest
18:30 CET	Gera 38'; Lipcsei 45' (pen.)	Report		Stadium: Üllői úti stadion Attendance: 15,627; Referee: Attila Hanacsek

23 March 2002 26	Sopron	2 – 1	Ferencváros	Sopron
15:00 CET	Somogyi 25'; Yavruyan 58'	Report	Gera 42'	Stadium: Káposztás utcai Stadion; Attendance: 4,800; Referee: Ferenc Bede

30 March 2002 27	Ferencváros	4 – 1	Videoton	Budapest
18:30 CET	Szili 8'; Lipcsei 51' (pen.); Jović 75'; Vén 77'	Report	Szalai 32'; Pomper (red card) 51'	Stadium: Üllői úti stadion Attendance: 7,406; Referee: Attila Dubraviczky

6 April 2002 28	Dunaferr	0 – 1	Ferencváros	Akasztó
16:30 CEST		Report	Gera 13'	Stadium: Stadler Stadion; Attendance: 5,000; Referee: Zoltán Szarka

10 April 2002 29	Ferencváros	5 – 0	Haladás	Budapest
19:00 CEST	Kriston 11'; Gera 56'; Lipcsei 58'; Kapič 70'; Penksa 82'	Report		Stadium: Üllői úti stadion Attendance: 5,478; Referee: János Megyebíró

13 April 2002 30	Ferencváros	0 – 1	Debrecen	Budapest
16:30 CEST		Report	Balog 80' (o.g.)	Stadium: Üllői úti stadion Attendance: 6,465; Referee: Attila Ábrahám

20 April 2002 31	Vasas	0 – 0	Ferencváros	Budapest
16:30 CEST		Report		Stadium: Illovszky Rudolf Stadion; Attendance: 6,000; Referee: János Makai

24 April 2002 32	Ferencváros	4 – 0	Győr	Budapest
17:45 CEST	Jović 16', 57'; Lipcsei 80'; Szili 89'	Report		Stadium: Üllői úti stadion Attendance: 6,673; Referee: Ferenc Bede

27 April 2002 33	MTK Budapest	0 – 1	Ferencváros	Budapest
16:30 CEST		Report	Horváth 12'	Stadium: Hungária körúti stadion Attendance: 5,000; Referee: Viktor Kassai

==== Second stage ====
4 May 2002 34	Ferencváros	1 – 0	MTK Budapest	Budapest
19:30 CEST	Szili 2'	Report	Elek (red card) 75'	Stadium: Üllői úti stadion Attendance: 7,550; Referee: Attila Dubraviczky

11 May 2002 35	Videoton	1 – 2	Ferencváros	Székesfehérvár
18:30 CEST	Tímár 21'	Report	Lipcsei 43' (pen.); Penksa 54'; Dragóner (red card) 69'	Stadium: Sóstói Stadion; Attendance: 9,000; Referee: Attila Juhos

18 May 2002 36	Újpest	3 – 2	Ferencváros	Budapest
16:30 CEST	Erős 55'; Lőw 59'; Herczeg 90+2'	Report	Jović 61', 64'	Stadium: Megyeri úti stadion Attendance: 6,000; Referee: Zsolt Szabó

22 May 2002 37	Zalaegerszeg	1 – 1	Ferencváros	Zalaegerszeg
17:00 CEST	Sabo 71'	Report	Gyepes 56'	Stadium: ZTE Arena; Attendance: 16,000; Referee: Attila Ábrahám

25 May 2002 38	Ferencváros	2 – 0	Dunaferr	Budapest
15:30 CEST	Dragóner 65'; Cheregi 90+2'	Report		Stadium: Üllői úti stadion Attendance: 6,304; Referee: Attila Dubraviczky

== Hungarian Cup ==
10 October 2001 Round of 32	Ferencváros	1 – 1 (a.e.t.) (1–4 p)	Újpest	Budapest
CEST	Pinte 45'	Report	Korolovszky 72'	Stadium: Üllői úti stadion Attendance: 7,500; Referee: Attila Ábrahám
	Penalties
	Hrutka (penalty missed); Szkukalek (penalty missed); Pinte (penalty scored)		(penalty scored) Medgyesi; (penalty scored) Korolovszky; (penalty scored) Poljaković; (penalty scored) Vágner

== UEFA Champions League ==
=== Second qualifying round ===
25 July 2001 Q2 Leg 1	Ferencváros	0 – 0	(Croatia) Hajduk Split	Budapest, Hungary
CEST		Report		Stadium: Üllői úti stadion Attendance: 9,259; Referee: (Finland) Mikko Vuorela

1 August 2001 Q2 Leg 2	Hajduk Split (Croatia)	0 – 0 (a.e.t.) (5–4 p)	Ferencváros	Split, Croatia
CEST		Report		Stadium: Stadion Poljud; Attendance: 26,400; Referee: (Turkey) Orhan Erdemir
	Penalties
	Asanović (penalty scored); Srna (penalty missed); Carević (penalty scored); Deranja (penalty scored); Štimac (penalty scored); Musa (penalty scored)		(penalty missed) Alex Arruda; (penalty scored) Pinte; (penalty scored) Szkukalek; (penalty scored) Lipcsei; (penalty scored) Vén; (penalty missed) Dragóner

== Statistics ==
=== Appearances and goals ===
Last updated on 25 May 2002.

No.	Pos	Nat	Player	Total		Nemzeti Bajnokság I		Hungarian Cup		UEFA Champions League	
No.	Pos	Nat	Player	Apps	Goals	Apps	Goals	Apps	Goals	Apps	Goals
2	DF	(Hungary) HUN	Zoltán Balog	28	0	26	0	1	0	1	0
5	MF	(Slovakia) SVK	Igor Szkukalek	39	0	36	0	1	0	2	0
6	MF	(Hungary) HUN	Péter Lipcsei	39	8	36	8	1	0	2	0
7	MF	(Slovakia) SVK	Attila Pinte	35	4	32	3	1	1	2	0
8	FW	(Hungary) HUN	Péter Horváth	16	5	15	5	1	0	0	0
9	FW	(Hungary) HUN	Attila Szili	7	3	7	3	0	0	0	0
11	MF	(Hungary) HUN	Gábor Vén	29	3	27	3	1	0	1	0
14	MF	(Hungary) HUN	József Keller	13	0	13	0	0	0	0	0
16	FW	(Federal Republic of Yugoslavia) YUG	Aleksandar Jović	32	11	31	11	1	0	0	0
18	DF	(Romania) ROU	Marius Cheregi	20	1	17	1	1	0	2	0
20	MF	(Hungary) HUN	Zalán Zombori	21	2	21	2	0	0	0	0
21	DF	(Federal Republic of Yugoslavia) YUG	Dragan Vukmir	12	0	12	0	0	0	0	0
22	GK	(Hungary) HUN	Lajos Szűcs	40	-38	37	-37	1	-1	2	0
24	DF	(Hungary) HUN	Gábor Gyepes	36	3	33	3	1	0	2	0
25	GK	(Hungary) HUN	Gábor Németh	1	-2	1	-2	0	0	0	0
26	DF	(Hungary) HUN	Attila Dragóner	33	4	31	4	0	0	2	0
27	MF	(Hungary) HUN	Attila Kriston	33	2	30	2	1	0	2	0
29	FW	(Brazil) BRA	Alex Monken	3	0	1	0	0	0	2	0
30	MF	(Hungary) HUN	Zoltán Gera	29	8	27	8	0	0	2	0
53	MF	(Slovenia) SVN	Adem Kapič	13	1	13	1	0	0	0	0
99	MF	(Slovakia) SVK	Marek Penksa	13	4	13	4	0	0	0	0
Out to loan:
12	FW	(Ukraine) UKR	Serhiy Kuznetsov	4	0	4	0	0	0	0	0
15	MF	(Hungary) HUN	Csaba Földvári	1	0	1	0	0	0	0	0
23	DF	(Hungary) HUN	János Hrutka	17	4	14	4	1	0	2	0
28	FW	(Hungary) HUN	Zoltán Fülöp	11	1	11	1	0	0	0	0
31	MF	(Hungary) HUN	Zoltán Varga	3	0	3	0	0	0	0	0
Players no longer at the club:
4	MF	(Hungary) HUN	Norbert Nagy	6	0	5	0	0	0	1	0
9	FW	(Hungary) HUN	Ferenc Hámori	1	0	1	0	0	0	0	0
10	MF	(Hungary) HUN	Tibor Szabó	23	0	20	0	1	0	2	0
13	FW	(Slovakia) SVK	Tibor Jančula	10	1	9	1	1	0	0	0

=== Top scorers ===
Includes all competitive matches. The list is sorted by shirt number when total goals are equal.

Last updated on 25 May 2002.

Position	Nation	Number	Name	Nemzeti Bajnokság I	Hungarian Cup	UEFA Champions League	Total
1	(Federal Republic of Yugoslavia)	16	Aleksandar Jović	11	0	0	11
2	(Hungary)	30	Zoltán Gera	8	0	0	8
3	(Hungary)	6	Péter Lipcsei	8	0	0	8
4	(Hungary)	8	Péter Horváth	5	0	0	5
5	(Hungary)	23	János Hrutka	4	0	0	4
6	(Slovakia)	99	Marek Penksa	4	0	0	4
7	(Hungary)	26	Attila Dragóner	4	0	0	4
8	(Slovakia)	7	Attila Pinte	3	1	0	4
9	(Hungary)	11	Gábor Vén	3	0	0	3
10	(Hungary)	9	Attila Szili	3	0	0	3
11	(Hungary)	24	Gábor Gyepes	3	0	0	3
12	(Hungary)	20	Zalán Zombori	2	0	0	2
13	(Hungary)	27	Attila Kriston	2	0	0	2
14	(Slovakia)	13	Tibor Jančula	1	0	0	1
15	(Hungary)	22	Lajos Szűcs	1	0	0	1
16	(Hungary)	28	Zoltán Fülöp	1	0	0	1
17	(Hungary)	53	Adem Kapič	1	0	0	1
18	(Romania)	18	Marius Cheregi	1	0	0	1
/	/	/	Own Goals	1	0	0	1
			TOTALS	66	1	0	67

=== Disciplinary record ===
Includes all competitive matches. Players with 1 card or more included only.

Last updated on 25 May 2002.

Position	Nation	Number	Name	Nemzeti Bajnokság I		Hungarian Cup		UEFA Champions League		Total (Hu Total)	
Position	Nation	Number	Name	Booked	Sent off (straight red)	Booked	Sent off (straight red)	Booked	Sent off (straight red)	Booked	Sent off (straight red)
MF	(Hungary)	4	Norbert Nagy	1	0	0	0	0	0	1 (1)	0 (0)
MF	(Slovakia)	5	Igor Szkukalek	4	0	0	0	1	0	5 (4)	0 (0)
MF	(Hungary)	6	Péter Lipcsei	6	0	1	0	0	0	7 (6)	0 (0)
MF	(Slovakia)	7	Attila Pinte	4	0	0	0	0	0	4 (4)	0 (0)
MF	(Hungary)	11	Gábor Vén	1	0	0	0	0	0	1 (1)	0 (0)
MF	(Hungary)	14	József Keller	1	0	0	0	0	0	1 (1)	0 (0)
FW	(Federal Republic of Yugoslavia)	16	Aleksandar Jović	2	0	0	0	0	0	2 (2)	0 (0)
DF	(Romania)	18	Marius Cheregi	3	1	0	0	1	0	4 (3)	1 (1)
MF	(Hungary)	20	Zalán Zombori	3	0	0	0	0	0	3 (3)	0 (0)
DF	(Federal Republic of Yugoslavia)	21	Dragan Vukmir	1	1	0	0	0	0	1 (1)	1 (1)
GK	(Hungary)	22	Lajos Szűcs	0	1	0	0	0	0	0 (0)	1 (1)
DF	(Hungary)	23	János Hrutka	4	0	0	0	1	0	5 (4)	0 (0)
DF	(Hungary)	24	Gábor Gyepes	4	0	0	0	1	0	5 (4)	0 (0)
DF	(Hungary)	26	Attila Dragóner	6	2	0	0	0	0	6 (6)	2 (2)
MF	(Hungary)	27	Attila Kriston	8	1	0	0	1	0	9 (8)	1 (1)
FW	(Hungary)	28	Zoltán Fülöp	3	1	0	0	0	0	3 (3)	1 (1)
MF	(Hungary)	30	Zoltán Gera	4	0	0	0	2	0	6 (4)	0 (0)
MF	(Slovenia)	53	Adem Kapič	2	0	0	0	0	0	2 (2)	0 (0)
MF	(Slovakia)	99	Marek Penksa	1	0	0	0	0	0	1 (1)	0 (0)
			TOTALS	58	7	1	0	7	0	66 (58)	7 (7)

=== Overall ===
Games played	41 (38 Nemzeti Bajnokság I, 1 Hungarian Cup and 2 UEFA Champions League)
Games won	21 (21 Nemzeti Bajnokság I, 0 Hungarian Cup and 0 UEFA Champions League)
Games drawn	9 (6 Nemzeti Bajnokság I, 1 Hungarian Cup and 2 UEFA Champions League)
Games lost	11 (11 Nemzeti Bajnokság I, 0 Hungarian Cup and 0 UEFA Champions League)
Goals scored	67
Goals conceded	40
Goal difference	+27
Yellow cards	66
Red cards	7
Worst discipline	(Hungary) Attila Kriston (9 (yellow card) , 1 (red card) )
Best result	5–0 (H) v Haladás - (Nemzeti Bajnokság I) - 10–4–2002
Worst result	0–3 (H) v Dunaferr - (Nemzeti Bajnokság I) - 9–11–2001
Most appearances	(Hungary) Lajos Szűcs (40 appearances)
Top scorer	(Federal Republic of Yugoslavia) Aleksandar Jović (11 goals)
Points	72/123 (58.53%)

Last updated: 25 May 2002
