= 2000–01 Ferencvárosi TC season =

Ferencvárosi TC
2000–01 season
- Chairman: János Furulyás
- Manager: János Csank
- Stadium: Üllői úti stadion
- NB 1: Winner
- Hungarian Cup: Round of 32
- Top goalscorer: League: Péter Horváth (15); All: Péter Horváth (15)
- Highest home attendance: 13,262 vs Újpest (12 May 2001)
- Lowest home attendance: 5,000 vs Sopron (21 October 2000)

The 2000–01 season will be Ferencvárosi TC's 99th competitive season, 99th consecutive season in the OTP Bank Liga and 101st year in existence as a football club.

== Transfers ==
=== Summer ===
In: Note: Flags indicate national team as defined under FIFA eligibility rules; some limited exceptions apply. Players may hold more than one non-FIFA nationality.

| No. | Pos. | Nation | Player |
|---|---|---|---|
| 1 | GK | HUN | Csaba Sólyom (from Pécs) |
| 2 | DF | HUN | Zoltán Balog (from Cegléd) |
| 6 | MF | HUN | Péter Lipcsei (from Austria Salzburg) |
| 12 | FW | HUN | Zoltán Gera (from Pécs) |
| 16 | DF | ROU | Marius Cheregi (from Videoton) |
| 16 | FW | HUN | Ernő Kardos (from Pécs) |
| 20 | MF | HUN | Ákos Csiszár (from Győr) |
| 25 | GK | HUN | Gábor Németh (from Videoton) |
| 26 | DF | HUN | Attila Dragóner (from (Germany) Fortuna Köln) |

Out: Note: Flags indicate national team as defined under FIFA eligibility rules; some limited exceptions apply. Players may hold more than one non-FIFA nationality.

| No. | Pos. | Nation | Player |
|---|---|---|---|
| 2 | DF | HUN | Tibor Baranyai (to Kecskemét) |
| 6 | DF | HUN | Pál Lilik (loan to Nyíregyháza) |
| 10 | MF | HUN | Levente Schultz (loan to Pápa) |
| 13 | MF | HUN | Zoltán Váczi (to Kecskemét) |
| 14 | MF | HUN | Ákos Füzi (to MTK Budapest) |
| 18 | DF | HUN | Zoltán Jagodics (to (China) Liaoning) |
| 19 | MF | HUN | Zsolt Bárányos (loan return to (Belgium) Lommel) |
| 20 | MF | HUN | Béla Kovács (to Budapest Honvéd) |
| 23 | FW | HUN | Zoltán Bükszegi (to MTK Budapest) |
| 24 | MF | HUN | Balázs Lászka (loan to Kecskemét) |
| 26 | MF | HUN | Tamás Bócz (to BVSC Budapest) |
| 27 | DF | HUN | György Sallai |
| 28 | FW | HUN | Sándor Kulcsár (loan to Nyíregyháza) |
| 29 | FW | HUN | Zoltán Fülöp (loan to Nyíregyháza) |
| 30 | MF | HUN | Tamás Somorjai (loan to Dabas) |
| 39 | DF | HUN | László Csákvári |

=== Winter ===
In: Note: Flags indicate national team as defined under FIFA eligibility rules; some limited exceptions apply. Players may hold more than one non-FIFA nationality.

| No. | Pos. | Nation | Player |
|---|---|---|---|
| 7 | MF | SVK | Attila Pinte (from (Slovakia) Dunajska Streda) |
| 9 | FW | HUN | Ferenc Hámori (from (Israel) Maccabi Netanya) |
| 13 | FW | BRA | Alex Arruda (from (Brazil) Vasco da Gama) |
| 14 | DF | HUN | József Keller (from (France) Wasquehal) |
| 23 | DF | HUN | János Hrutka (from (Germany) Eintracht Frankfurt) |

Out: Note: Flags indicate national team as defined under FIFA eligibility rules; some limited exceptions apply. Players may hold more than one non-FIFA nationality.

| No. | Pos. | Nation | Player |
|---|---|---|---|
| 9 | FW | HUN | Kornél Rob (to Videoton) |
| 14 | MF | SVK | Norbert Csoknay (loan to Dabas) |
| 19 | MF | HUN | Tibor Halgas (loan to Pápa) |
| 22 | GK | HUN | János Vámos (to Zalaegerszeg) |
| 27 | FW | HUN | István Gajda (to Pápa) |

== Nemzeti Bajnokság I ==
=== League table ===
==== First stage ====
| Pos | Team | Pld | W | D | L | GF | GA | GD | Pts | Qualification or relegation |
|---|---|---|---|---|---|---|---|---|---|---|
| 1 | Tatabánya | 14 | 8 | 5 | 1 | 29 | 18 | +11 | 29 | Qualification for second stage |
| 2 | Dunaferr | 14 | 8 | 5 | 1 | 37 | 20 | +17 | 29 | Qualification for second stage |
| 3 | Ferencváros | 14 | 6 | 3 | 5 | 23 | 21 | +2 | 21 | Qualification for second stage |
| 4 | Sopron | 14 | 6 | 2 | 6 | 21 | 23 | −2 | 20 | Qualification for second stage |
| 5 | Győr | 14 | 5 | 3 | 6 | 21 | 23 | −2 | 18 | Qualification for second stage |
| 6 | Kispest Honvéd | 14 | 3 | 6 | 5 | 18 | 20 | −2 | 15 | Qualification for second stage |
| 7 | Haladás (R) | 14 | 3 | 4 | 7 | 14 | 24 | −10 | 13 | Relegation to Nemzeti Bajnokság II |
| 8 | Nyíregyháza (R) | 14 | 3 | 0 | 11 | 10 | 24 | −14 | 9 | Relegation to Nemzeti Bajnokság II |

Source: rsssf.com
(R) Relegated

==== Second stage ====
| Pos | Team | Pld | W | D | L | GF | GA | GD | BP | Pts | Qualification or relegation |
|---|---|---|---|---|---|---|---|---|---|---|---|
| 1 | Ferencváros (C) | 22 | 12 | 8 | 2 | 36 | 14 | +22 | 4 | 48 | Qualification for Champions League second qualifying round |
| 2 | Dunaferr | 22 | 13 | 2 | 7 | 40 | 35 | +5 | 5 | 46 | Qualification for UEFA Cup qualifying round |
| 3 | Vasas | 22 | 10 | 6 | 6 | 42 | 33 | +9 | 4 | 40 | |
| 4 | Újpest | 22 | 10 | 5 | 7 | 40 | 37 | +3 | 5 | 40 | |
| 5 | Győr | 22 | 11 | 5 | 6 | 34 | 32 | +2 | 2 | 40 | |

Source: rsssf.com
(C) Champions

=== Results summary ===
==== First stage ====
| Overall | | | | | | | | Home | | | | | | Away | | | | | |
| Pld | W | D | L | GF | GA | GD | Pts | W | D | L | GF | GA | GD | W | D | L | GF | GA | GD |
|---|---|---|---|---|---|---|---|---|---|---|---|---|---|---|---|---|---|---|---|
| 14 | 6 | 3 | 5 | 23 | 21 | +2 | 21 | 3 | 3 | 1 | 14 | 9 | +5 | 3 | 0 | 4 | 9 | 12 | −3 |

Last updated: 29 October 2000.
Source: NB1

==== Second stage ====
| Overall | | | | | | | | Home | | | | | | Away | | | | | |
| Pld | W | D | L | GF | GA | GD | Pts | W | D | L | GF | GA | GD | W | D | L | GF | GA | GD |
|---|---|---|---|---|---|---|---|---|---|---|---|---|---|---|---|---|---|---|---|
| 22 | 12 | 8 | 2 | 36 | 14 | +22 | 44 | 7 | 3 | 1 | 20 | 7 | +13 | 5 | 5 | 1 | 16 | 7 | +9 |

Last updated: 23 June 2001.
Source: NB1

==== Overall ====
| Overall | | | | | | | | Home | | | | | | Away | | | | | |
| Pld | W | D | L | GF | GA | GD | Pts | W | D | L | GF | GA | GD | W | D | L | GF | GA | GD |
|---|---|---|---|---|---|---|---|---|---|---|---|---|---|---|---|---|---|---|---|
| 36 | 18 | 11 | 7 | 59 | 35 | +24 | 65 | 10 | 6 | 2 | 34 | 16 | +18 | 8 | 5 | 5 | 25 | 19 | +6 |

Last updated: 23 June 2001.
Source: NB1

=== Results by round ===
==== First stage ====
| Round | 1 | 2 | 3 | 4 | 5 | 6 | 7 | 8 | 9 | 10 | 11 | 12 | 13 | 14 |
|---|---|---|---|---|---|---|---|---|---|---|---|---|---|---|
| Ground | H | A | H | H | A | A | H | A | H | A | A | H | H | A |
| Result | W | L | L | D | W | L | D | L | D | W | W | W | W | L |
| Position | 1 | 3 | 5 | 5 | 4 | 6 | 6 | 6 | 6 | 5 | 5 | 4 | 3 | 3 |

Updated to match(es) played on 29 October 2000. Source: Matches
A = Away; H = Home; W = Win; D = Draw; L = Loss

==== Second stage ====
| Round | 1 | 2 | 3 | 4 | 5 | 6 | 7 | 8 | 9 | 10 | 11 | 12 | 13 | 14 | 15 | 16 | 17 | 18 | 19 | 20 | 21 | 22 |
|---|---|---|---|---|---|---|---|---|---|---|---|---|---|---|---|---|---|---|---|---|---|---|
| Ground | A | H | A | H | A | H | A | H | A | A | H | H | A | H | A | H | A | H | A | H | H | A |
| Result | D | W | W | D | W | W | W | L | D | W | W | W | D | D | L | D | D | W | D | W | W | W |
| Position | 7 | 4 | 2 | 3 | 1 | 1 | 1 | 1 | 2 | 1 | 1 | 1 | 1 | 1 | 1 | 1 | 1 | 1 | 1 | 1 | 1 | 1 |

Updated to match(es) played on 23 June 2001. Source: Matches
A = Away; H = Home; W = Win; D = Draw; L = Loss

=== Matches ===
==== First stage ====
| 22 July 2000 1 | Ferencváros | 4 – 0 | Haladás | Budapest |
| 20:00 CEST | Gera 45'; Csiszár 61'; Horváth 77'; Rob 86' | Report | | Stadium: Üllői úti stadion Attendance: 9,315; Referee: Sándor Puhl |

| 6 September 2000 2 | Dunaferr | 5 – 2 | Ferencváros | Dunaújváros |
| 16:15 CEST | Tököli 36', 58'; Lengyel 39', 83'; Zavadszky 80' | Report | Salamon 78' (o.g.); Tóth 90+1' | Stadium: Dunaferr Arena; Attendance: 8,000; Referee: Attila Ábrahám |

| 5 August 2000 3 | Ferencváros | 1 – 3 | Győr | Budapest |
| 17:00 CEST | Horváth 45' | Report | Nagy 16', 59', 84' | Stadium: Üllői úti stadion Attendance: 7,241; Referee: Ferenc Bede |

| 11 August 2000 4 | Ferencváros | 2 – 2 | Kispest-Honvéd | Budapest |
| 17:30 CEST | Tóth 23'; Plókai 89' (o.g.) | Report | Plókai 22'; Horváth 34' | Stadium: Üllői úti stadion Attendance: 5,436; Referee: Zsolt Szabó |

| 19 August 2000 5 | Nyíregyháza | 0 – 1 | Ferencváros | Nyíregyháza |
| 17:00 CEST | | Report | Horváth 11' | Stadium: Városi Stadion; Attendance: 6,000; Referee: Csaba Sápi |

| 27 August 2000 6 | Sopron | 2 – 1 | Ferencváros | Sopron |
| 17:00 CEST | Tóth 26'; Somogyi 71' | Report | Dragóner 59' | Stadium: Káposztás utcai Stadion; Attendance: 8,000; Referee: József Bukovics |

| 9 September 2000 7 | Ferencváros | 2 – 2 | Tatabánya | Budapest |
| 19:00 CEST | Lipcsei 6'; Dragóner 72' | Report | Varga 46'; Hornyák 69' | Stadium: Üllői úti stadion Attendance: 5,637; Referee: István Hanyecz |

| 15 September 2000 8 | Haladás | 3 – 0 | Ferencváros | Szombathely |
| 17:30 CEST | Alex 48', 63'; Halmosi 81' | Report | | Stadium: Rohonci úti Stadion; Attendance: 7,000; Referee: Béla Kiss |

| 20 September 2000 9 | Ferencváros | 1 – 1 | Dunaferr | Budapest |
| 19:00 CEST | Gera 87' | Report | Tököli 31' | Stadium: Üllői úti stadion Attendance: 6,182; Referee: Attila Juhos |

| 23 September 2000 10 | Győr | 0 – 3 | Ferencváros | Győr |
| 16:00 CEST | | Report | Tóth 14'; Csiszár 72'; Gyepes 90+4' | Stadium: ETO Park; Attendance: 5,000; Referee: Csaba Sápi |

| 30 September 2000 11 | Kispest-Honvéd | 1 – 2 | Ferencváros | Budapest |
| 17:00 CEST | Faragó 2' | Report | Vén 27'; Horváth 85' | Stadium: Bozsik Stadion; Attendance: 4,000; Referee: Tamás Arany |

| 16 October 2000 12 | Ferencváros | 2 – 0 | Nyíregyháza | Budapest |
| 19:00 CEST | Horváth 11' (pen.); Kondora 57' (o.g.) | Report | | Stadium: Üllői úti stadion Attendance: 6,007; Referee: János Makai |

| 21 October 2000 13 | Ferencváros | 2 – 1 | Sopron | Budapest |
| 17:00 CEST | Horváth 31'; Lipcsei 45' | Report | Preisinger 22' | Stadium: Üllői úti stadion Attendance: 5,000; Referee: Tamás Arany |

| 29 October 2000 14 | Tatabánya | 1 – 0 | Ferencváros | Tatabánya |
| 13:30 CET | Kovács 60' (pen.) | Report | | Stadium: Városi Stadion; Attendance: 6,000; Referee: Attila Hajdó |

==== Second stage ====
| 4 November 2000 1 | Videoton | 0 – 0 | Ferencváros | Székesfehérvár |
| 17:00 CET | | Report | | Stadium: Sóstói Stadion; Attendance: 4,000; Referee: Attila Ábrahám |

| 11 November 2000 2 | Ferencváros | 2 – 0 | Győr | Budapest |
| 17:30 CET | Horváth 18'; Fülöp 84' | Report | | Stadium: Üllői úti stadion Attendance: 5,557; Referee: Zsolt Szabó |

| 19 November 2000 3 | Tatabánya | 0 – 5 | Ferencváros | Tatabánya |
| 13:00 CET | | Report | Pinte 16'; Horváth 24', 65', 90'; Gera 37' | Stadium: Városi Stadion; Attendance: 6,000; Referee: Béla Kiss |

| 25 November 2000 4 | Ferencváros | 0 – 0 | MTK Budapest | Budapest |
| 17:00 CET | | Report | | Stadium: Üllői úti stadion Attendance: 10,363; Referee: Attila Ábrahám |

| 30 November 2000 5 | Újpest | 0 – 1 | Ferencváros | Budapest |
| 17:00 CET | | Report | Dragóner 73' | Stadium: Megyeri úti stadion Attendance: 8,000; Referee: Zsolt Szabó |

| 3 March 2001 6 | Ferencváros | 2 – 0 | Dunaferr | Budapest |
| 16:45 CET | Horváth 13', 22' | Report | | Stadium: Üllői úti stadion Attendance: 10,402; Referee: Attila Ábrahám |

| 11 March 2011 7 | Sopron | 2 – 3 | Ferencváros | Sopron |
| 13:00 CET | Sira 42'; Nagy 60' | Report | Horváth 2'; Gera 73'; Hrutka 81' | Stadium: Káposztás utcai Stadion; Attendance: 8,000; Referee: Viktor Kassai |

| 17 March 2001 8 | Ferencváros | 1 – 2 | Kispest-Honvéd | Budapest |
| 16:45 CET | Gera 18' | Report | Kovács 24'; Pintér 39' | Stadium: Üllői úti stadion Attendance: 12,000; Referee: Attila Hanacsek |

| 30 March 2011 9 | Zalaegerszeg | 0 – 0 | Ferencváros | Zalaegerszeg |
| 18:00 CEST | | Report | | Stadium: ZTE Arena; Attendance: 16,000; Referee: Zsolt Szabó |

| 7 April 2011 10 | Vasas | 0 – 3 | Ferencváros | Budapest |
| 16:45 CEST | | Report | Pinte 52', 90'; Kriston 58' | Stadium: Illovszky Rudolf Stadion; Attendance: 8,000; Referee: János Megyebíró |

| 13 April 2001 11 | Ferencváros | 2 – 1 | Debrecen | Budapest |
| 18:00 CEST | Pinte 37', 89' | Report | Radojičić 76' | Stadium: Üllői úti stadion Attendance: 6,740; Referee: Béla Kiss |

| 18 April 2001 12 | Ferencváros | 5 – 0 | Videoton | Budapest |
| 19:00 CEST | Gera 4'; Balassa 12' (o.g.); Lipcsei 37'; Horváth 62' (pen.); Dragóner 81' | Report | | Stadium: Üllői úti stadion Attendance: 7,656; Referee: Viktor Kassai |

| 22 April 2001 13 | Győr | 0 – 0 | Ferencváros | Győr |
| 14:30 CEST | | Report | | Stadium: ETO Park; Attendance: 15,000; Referee: József Bukovics |

| 28 April 2001 14 | Ferencváros | 0 – 0 | Tatabánya | Budapest |
| 16:45 CEST | | Report | | Stadium: Üllői úti stadion Attendance: 6,983; Referee: Attila Hanacsek |

| 6 May 2001 15 | MTK Budapest | 5 – 2 | Ferencváros | Budapest |
| 18:00 CEST | Bükszegi 44'; Illés 45'; Ferenczi 53', 58'; Juhász 82' | Report | Gera 67'; Horváth 69' | Stadium: Hungária körúti stadion Attendance: 9,000; Referee: János Megyebíró |

| 12 May 2001 16 | Ferencváros | 2 – 2 | Újpest | Budapest |
| 16:45 CEST | Vén 26'; Pinte 66' | Report | Urbán 27'; Kunzo 67' | Stadium: Üllői úti stadion Attendance: 13,262; Referee: Zsolt Szabó |

| 20 May 2001 17 | Dunaferr | 0 – 0 | Ferencváros | Dunaújváros |
| 17:15 CEST | | Report | | Stadium: Dunaferr Arena; Attendance: 13,000; Referee: Viktor Kassai |

| 27 May 2001 18 | Ferencváros | 1 – 0 | Sopron | Budapest |
| 18:00 CEST | Tóth 38' | Report | | Stadium: Üllői úti stadion Attendance: 8,386; Referee: József Szabó |

| 10 June 2000 19 | Kispest-Honvéd | 0 – 0 | Ferencváros | Budapest |
| 18:15 CEST | | Report | | Stadium: Bozsik Stadion; Attendance: 10,000; Referee: Attila Juhos |

| 16 June 2001 20 | Ferencváros | 3 – 2 | Zalaegerszeg | Budapest |
| 16:45 CEST | Hrutka 20'; Csiszár 62' (pen.); Dragóner 86' | Report | Egressy 50'; Waltner 56' | Stadium: Üllői úti stadion Attendance: 6,807; Referee: Ferenc Bede |

| 20 June 2001 21 | Ferencváros | 2 – 0 | Vasas | Budapest |
| 17:00 CEST | Tóth 18' (pen.); Hrutka 58' (pen.) | Report | | Stadium: Üllői úti stadion Attendance: 12,000; Referee: József Bukovics |

| 23 June 2000 22 | Debrecen | 0 – 2 | Ferencváros | Debrecen |
| 17:15 CEST | | Report | Hrutka 34'; Gyepes 90+4' | Stadium: Oláh Gábor utcai Stadion; Attendance: 7,000; Referee: Attila Hanacsek |

== Hungarian Cup ==
=== Group stage ===
| 26 July 2000 1st match | Petneháza | 0 – 5 | Ferencváros | Petneháza |
| CEST | | Report | Kardos 4'; Tóth 5'; Gajda 49', 71'; Csiszár 58' | Stadium: Városi Sportpálya; Attendance: 2,500; Referee: Csaba Sápi |

| 28 July 2000 2nd match | Eger | 0 – 6 | Ferencváros | Eger |
| CEST | | Report | Takács 26' (o.g.); Lipcsei 35'; Tóth 48', 82'; Vén 54'; Horváth 87' | Stadium: Szentmarjay Tibor Városi Stadion; Attendance: 3,000; Referee: József Bukovics |

| 2 August 2000 3rd match | Nyékládháza | 0 – 3 | Ferencváros | Nyékládháza |
| CEST | | Report | Horváth 31' (pen.); Tóth 41', 59' | Stadium: Városi Sportpálya; Attendance: 2,800; Referee: Attila Hajdó |

=== Final stage ===
| 25 October 2000 Round of 32 | Újpest | 2 – 0 | Ferencváros | Budapest |
| CEST | Herczeg 1', 83' | Report | | Stadium: Megyeri úti stadion Attendance: 6,000; Referee: Attila Hanacsek |

== Statistics ==
=== Appearances and goals ===
Last updated on 23 June 2001.

| No. | Pos | Nat | Player | Total | | NB 1 | | Hungarian Cup | |
| No. | Pos | Nat | Player | Apps | Goals | Apps | Goals | Apps | Goals |
|---|---|---|---|---|---|---|---|---|---|
| 1 | GK | (Hungary) HUN | Csaba Sólyom | 1 | 0 | 0 | 0 | 1 | 0 |
| 2 | DF | (Hungary) HUN | Zoltán Balog | 20 | 0 | 19 | 0 | 1 | 0 |
| 3 | DF | (Hungary) HUN | Pál Lakos | 5 | 0 | 2 | 0 | 3 | 0 |
| 4 | MF | (Hungary) HUN | Norbert Nagy | 23 | 0 | 22 | 0 | 1 | 0 |
| 5 | DF | (Hungary) HUN | Mihály Szűcs | 10 | 0 | 9 | 0 | 1 | 0 |
| 6 | MF | (Hungary) HUN | Péter Lipcsei | 32 | 4 | 28 | 3 | 4 | 1 |
| 7 | MF | (Slovakia) SVK | Attila Pinte | 20 | 6 | 20 | 6 | 0 | 0 |
| 8 | FW | (Hungary) HUN | Péter Horváth | 32 | 17 | 29 | 15 | 3 | 2 |
| 10 | MF | (Hungary) HUN | Levente Schultz | 7 | 0 | 7 | 0 | 0 | 0 |
| 11 | MF | (Hungary) HUN | Gábor Vén | 39 | 3 | 35 | 2 | 4 | 1 |
| 12 | FW | (Hungary) HUN | Zoltán Gera | 35 | 7 | 32 | 7 | 3 | 0 |
| 13 | FW | (Brazil) BRA | Alex Monken | 8 | 0 | 8 | 0 | 0 | 0 |
| 14 | MF | (Hungary) HUN | József Keller | 17 | 0 | 17 | 0 | 0 | 0 |
| 15 | MF | (Hungary) HUN | Csaba Földvári | 22 | 0 | 20 | 0 | 2 | 0 |
| 16 | FW | (Hungary) HUN | Ernő Kardos | 12 | 1 | 8 | 0 | 4 | 1 |
| 17 | DF | (Federal Republic of Yugoslavia) YUG | Dragan Crnomarković | 8 | 0 | 8 | 0 | 0 | 0 |
| 18 | DF | (Romania) ROU | Marius Cheregi | 25 | 0 | 22 | 0 | 3 | 0 |
| 20 | MF | (Hungary) HUN | Ákos Csiszár | 29 | 4 | 25 | 3 | 4 | 1 |
| 21 | FW | (Hungary) HUN | Mihály Tóth | 31 | 10 | 27 | 5 | 4 | 5 |
| 22 | GK | (Hungary) HUN | Lajos Szűcs | 22 | -14 | 22 | -14 | 0 | 0 |
| 23 | DF | (Hungary) HUN | János Hrutka | 19 | 4 | 19 | 4 | 0 | 0 |
| 24 | DF | (Hungary) HUN | Gábor Gyepes | 30 | 2 | 29 | 2 | 1 | 0 |
| 25 | GK | (Hungary) HUN | Gábor Németh | 11 | -11 | 8 | -9 | 3 | -2 |
| 26 | DF | (Hungary) HUN | Attila Dragóner | 38 | 5 | 34 | 5 | 4 | 0 |
| 27 | MF | (Hungary) HUN | Attila Kriston | 18 | 1 | 16 | 1 | 2 | 0 |
| 28 | FW | (Hungary) HUN | Zoltán Fülöp | 11 | 1 | 11 | 1 | 0 | 0 |
Out to loan:
| 14 | MF | (Slovakia) SVK | Norbert Csoknay | 3 | 0 | 2 | 0 | 1 | 0 |
| 19 | MF | (Hungary) HUN | Tibor Halgas | 6 | 0 | 3 | 0 | 3 | 0 |
Players no longer at the club:
| 9 | FW | (Hungary) HUN | Kornél Rob | 14 | 1 | 11 | 1 | 3 | 0 |
| 22 | GK | (Hungary) HUN | János Vámos | 7 | -12 | 6 | -12 | 1 | 0 |
| 27 | FW | (Hungary) HUN | István Gajda | 3 | 2 | 2 | 0 | 1 | 2 |

=== Top scorers ===
Includes all competitive matches. The list is sorted by shirt number when total goals are equal.

Last updated on 23 June 2001.

| Position | Nation | Number | Name | NB 1 | Hungarian Cup | Total |
|---|---|---|---|---|---|---|
| 1 | (Hungary) | 8 | Péter Horváth | 15 | 2 | 17 |
| 2 | (Hungary) | 19 | Mihály Tóth | 5 | 5 | 10 |
| 3 | (Hungary) | 12 | Zoltán Gera | 7 | 0 | 7 |
| 4 | (Slovakia) | 7 | Attila Pinte | 6 | 0 | 6 |
| 5 | (Hungary) | 26 | Attila Dragóner | 5 | 0 | 5 |
| 6 | (Hungary) | 23 | János Hrutka | 4 | 0 | 4 |
| 7 | (Hungary) | 6 | Péter Lipcsei | 3 | 1 | 4 |
| 8 | (Hungary) | 20 | Ákos Csiszár | 3 | 1 | 4 |
| 9 | (Hungary) | 11 | Gábor Vén | 2 | 1 | 3 |
| 10 | (Hungary) | 24 | Gábor Gyepes | 2 | 0 | 2 |
| 11 | (Hungary) | 27 | István Gajda | 0 | 2 | 2 |
| 12 | (Hungary) | 9 | Kornél Rob | 1 | 0 | 1 |
| 13 | (Hungary) | 28 | Zoltán Fülöp | 1 | 0 | 1 |
| 14 | (Hungary) | 27 | Attila Kriston | 1 | 0 | 1 |
| 15 | (Hungary) | 16 | Ernő Kardos | 0 | 1 | 1 |
| / | / | / | Own Goals | 4 | 1 | 5 |
| | | | TOTALS | 59 | 14 | 73 |

=== Disciplinary record ===
Includes all competitive matches. Players with 1 card or more included only.

Last updated on 23 June 2001.

| Position | Nation | Number | Name | NB 1 | | Hungarian Cup | | Total (Hu Total) | |
| Position | Nation | Number | Name | Booked | Sent off (straight red) | Booked | Sent off (straight red) | Booked | Sent off (straight red) |
| DF | (Hungary) | 2 | Zoltán Balog | 2 | 0 | 0 | 0 | 2 (2) | 0 (0) |
| MF | (Hungary) | 4 | Norbert Nagy | 4 | 0 | 0 | 0 | 4 (4) | 0 (0) |
| DF | (Hungary) | 5 | Mihály Szűcs | 3 | 0 | 0 | 0 | 3 (3) | 0 (0) |
| MF | (Hungary) | 6 | Péter Lipcsei | 6 | 1 | 1 | 0 | 7 (6) | 1 (1) |
| MF | (Slovakia) | 7 | Attila Pinte | 1 | 0 | 0 | 0 | 1 (1) | 0 (0) |
| FW | (Hungary) | 8 | Péter Horváth | 4 | 0 | 0 | 0 | 4 (4) | 0 (0) |
| FW | (Hungary) | 12 | Zoltán Gera | 4 | 0 | 1 | 0 | 5 (4) | 0 (0) |
| MF | (Hungary) | 14 | József Keller | 3 | 0 | 0 | 0 | 3 (3) | 0 (0) |
| MF | (Hungary) | 15 | Csaba Földvári | 3 | 1 | 0 | 0 | 3 (3) | 1 (1) |
| DF | (Federal Republic of Yugoslavia) | 17 | Dragan Crnomarković | 1 | 0 | 0 | 0 | 1 (1) | 0 (0) |
| DF | (Romania) | 18 | Marius Cheregi | 6 | 1 | 0 | 0 | 6 (6) | 1 (1) |
| MF | (Hungary) | 20 | Ákos Csiszár | 5 | 0 | 0 | 0 | 5 (5) | 0 (0) |
| FW | (Hungary) | 21 | Mihály Tóth | 2 | 0 | 0 | 0 | 2 (2) | 0 (0) |
| GK | (Hungary) | 22 | Lajos Szűcs | 1 | 0 | 0 | 0 | 1 (1) | 0 (0) |
| DF | (Hungary) | 23 | János Hrutka | 3 | 0 | 0 | 0 | 3 (3) | 0 (0) |
| DF | (Hungary) | 24 | Gábor Gyepes | 4 | 0 | 0 | 0 | 4 (4) | 0 (0) |
| DF | (Hungary) | 26 | Attila Dragóner | 7 | 1 | 1 | 0 | 8 (7) | 1 (1) |
| MF | (Hungary) | 7 | Attila Kriston | 5 | 0 | 0 | 0 | 5 (5) | 0 (0) |
| FW | (Hungary) | 28 | Zoltán Fülöp | 2 | 0 | 0 | 0 | 2 (2) | 0 (0) |
| | | | TOTALS | 66 | 4 | 3 | 0 | 69 (66) | 4 (4) |

=== Overall ===
| Games played | 40 (36 NB 1 and 4 Hungarian Cup) |
| Games won | 21 (18 NB 1 and 3 Hungarian Cup) |
| Games drawn | 11 (11 NB 1 and 0 Hungarian Cup) |
| Games lost | 8 (7 NB 1 and 1 Hungarian Cup) |
| Goals scored | 73 |
| Goals conceded | 37 |
| Goal difference | +36 |
| Yellow cards | 69 |
| Red cards | 4 |
| Worst discipline | (Hungary) Attila Dragóner (8 (yellow card) , 1 (red card) ) |
| Best result | 6–0 (A) v Eger - (Hungarian Cup) - 28–7–2000 |
| Worst result | 2–5 (A) v Dunaferr - (NB 1) - 6–9–2000 |
| Worst result | 0–3 (A) v Haladás - (NB 1) - 15–9–2000 |
| Worst result | 2–5 (A) v MTK Budapest - (NB 1) - 6–5–2001 |
| Most appearances | (Hungary) Gábor Vén (39 appearances) |
| Top scorer | (Hungary) Péter Horváth (17 goals) |
| Points | 74/120 (61.66%) |

Last updated: 23 June 2001
