= 1992–93 Magyar Kupa =

Tournament details
- Country: Hungary

Final positions
- Champions: Ferencváros
- Runners-up: Szombathelyi Haladás

The 1992–93 Magyar Kupa (English: Hungarian Cup) was the 53rd season of Hungary's annual knock-out cup football competition.

== Quarter-finals ==
Team 1	Agg.	Team 2	1st leg	2nd leg
Sárandi	1–5	MTK Budapest	1–2	0–3
BVSC	0–2	Békéscsaba	0–2	0–0
Kispest Honvéd	3–5	Szombathelyi Haladás	2–1	1–4
Pécs	3–3 (a)	Ferencváros	0–2	3–1

== Semi-finals ==
Team 1	Agg.	Team 2	1st leg	2nd leg
MTK Budapest	1–2	Ferencváros	1–1	0–1
Szombathelyi Haladás	4–3	Békéscsaba	3–0	1–3

== Final ==
2 June 1993
20:00 (UTC+2)

Szombathelyi Haladás	1–1	Ferencváros
Jagodics 31'	Report	Keller 40'

Rohonci úti Stadion, Szombathely
Attendance: 18,000
Referee: Sándor Márton (Hungary)
23 June 1993
20:00 (UTC+2)

Ferencváros	1–1	Szombathelyi Haladás
Fodor 23'	Report	Kovács 89'
Penalties
Lipcsei (penalty scored); Gregor (penalty scored); Telek (penalty scored); Keller (penalty scored); Fodor (penalty scored)	5–3	(penalty scored) Kenesei; (penalty scored) Jagodics; (penalty missed) Neudl; (penalty scored) Nagy

Üllői úti stadion, Budapest
Attendance: 18,000
Referee: László Vágner (Hungary)

== See also ==
- 1992–93 Nemzeti Bajnokság I
