= Zoltán Gera =

Hungarian footballer

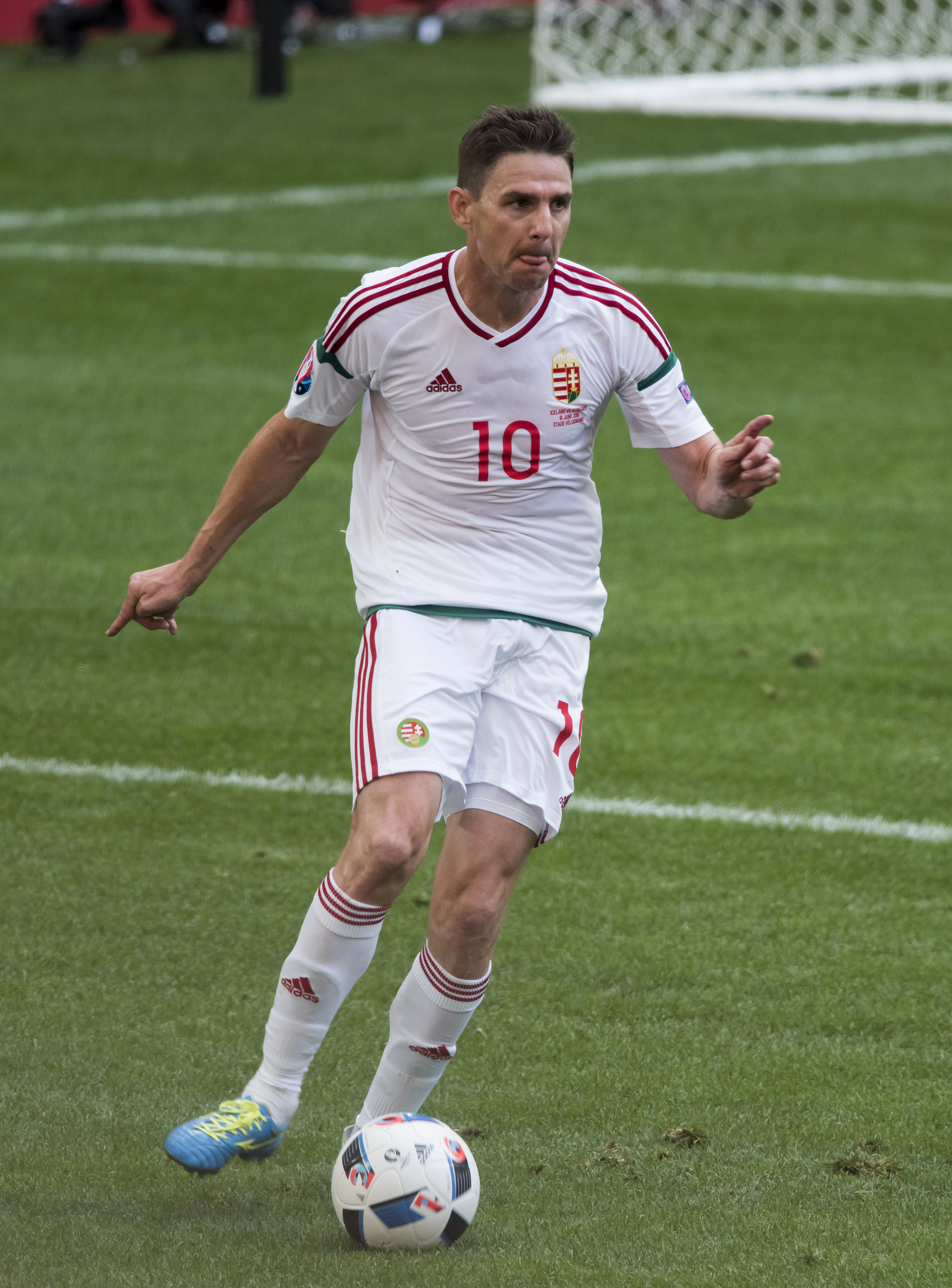
- Gera playing for Hungary at Euro 2016

Personal information
- Full name: Zoltán Gera
- Date of birth: 22 April 1979 (age 47)
- Place of birth: Pécs, Hungary
- Height: 1.83 m (6 ft 0 in)
- Position: Midfielder

Team information
- Current team: Vasas SC (manager)

Youth career
- 1993–1996: Pécsi Bőrgyár
- Pécsi Zsolnay
- Pécsi Kinizsi

Senior career*
Years	Team	Apps	(Gls)
1996–1997	Harkány SE		
1997–2000	Pécs	71	(14)
2000–2004	Ferencváros	115	(32)
2004–2008	West Bromwich Albion	135	(21)
2008–2011	Fulham	86	(5)
2011–2014	West Bromwich Albion	30	(4)
2014–2018	Ferencváros	89	(15)
Total		526	(91)

International career
1999–2000	Hungary U21	3	(0)
2002–2017	Hungary	97	(26)

Managerial career
- 2018–2019: Ferencváros (assistant manager)
- 2018–2021: Hungary (assistant manager)
- 2019–2024: Hungary U21
- 2024: Vasas SC
- 2024–: Kecskeméti TE
- * Club domestic league appearances and goals

Zoltán Gera (born 22 April 1979) is a Hungarian former professional footballer who played as a midfielder. He is best known for two spells at Ferencváros and West Bromwich Albion.

Gera is known for his overhead-kick goals and his cartwheel to back-flip celebration, which he demonstrated in Fulham's Europa League quarter-final win against Juventus in 2010. He was named Hungarian Player of the Year in 2002, 2004 and 2005. For his efforts in the 2009–10 season and his goals in the Europa League, Gera was named Fulham's Player of the Season.

Gera made his international debut for Hungary in 2002 against Switzerland, with his nation losing 2–1. In 2009, Gera briefly retired from the national team following a dispute with then-manager Erwin Koeman. When Koeman was replaced by Sándor Egervári in 2010, Gera returned to Hungary's international squad which he later represented at the 2016 UEFA European Championship. He announced his final retirement from football on 28 June 2018.

== Club career ==
=== Harkány SE ===
Gera started his professional career for Harkány SE in 1996, remaining there for one year before signing for Pécsi Mecsek FC.

=== Pécsi Mecsek ===
Gera was signed by Pécsi Mecsek in 1997. During his three-year spell with the club, he made 87 appearances and scored 16 times. On 1 July 2000, Gera moved to major Hungarian side Ferencváros on a free transfer.

=== Ferencváros ===
During his four-year spell at Ferencváros, Gera played 115 league games and scored 32 goals. He won the Hungarian league title in 2001 and 2004, the Magyar Kupa in 2003 and 2004, and the Szuperkupa in 2004. He also received his first international call up while with the club.

=== West Bromwich Albion ===
On 30 July 2004, Gera moved to English Premier League club West Bromwich Albion for a fee of £1.5 million. He signed a three-year contract with Albion, with a further one-year option in the club's favour. He made his Premier League debut on 14 August 2004, replacing Andy Johnson in the 87th minute against Blackburn Rovers. The match ended in a 1–1 draw. Gera's first appearance in the starting lineup came on 25 August 2004 against Tottenham Hotspur. He scored his first league goal early in the third minute; that match also ended in a 1–1 draw.

The club struggled against relegation for most of the season, and Gera was portrayed by the media as an integral part of this struggle. Towards the end of the season, however, Gera's influence grew. He produced stirring performances, including a match-winning header against Everton on 3 April 2005. The club's form quickly improved, securing its continued Premier League status on the last day of the season. Gera scored six league goals in this his first season and was the only player at the club to appear in all 38 league matches. He was nominated in the end-of-season "dream team" by soccernet.com. During the 2005–06 season, Gera struggled with injuries and underwent a hernia operation in November 2005. At the end of the season, West Brom were relegated and Gera committed himself to the club. His performance in the club's 4–2 win against Charlton Athletic on 15 December 2007, scoring twice and setting up a third goal, earned him a place in the Championship Team of the Week. Gera helped Albion gain promotion in the 2007–08 season and scored the only goal in an important win against local rivals Wolverhampton Wanderers in April to send West Brom top. On 9 June 2008, he decided to turn down a new contract offer from West Brom, choosing instead to join Fulham in the Premier League on a free transfer. The three-year contract was completed on 11 June 2008.

=== Fulham ===
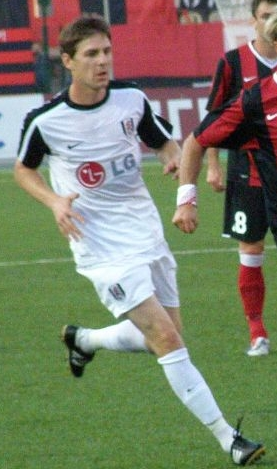
Gera playing for Fulham

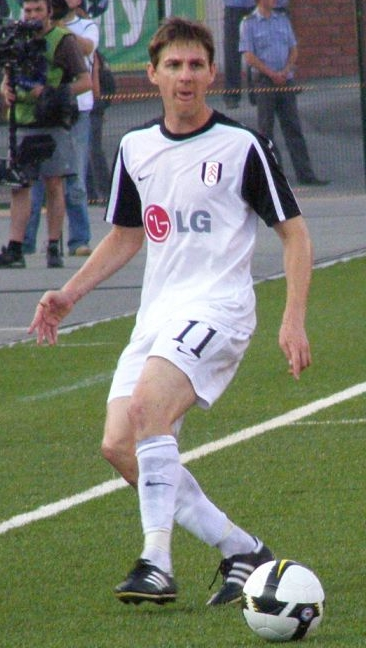
Gera in action for Fulham in August 2009

Gera played in the 2010 UEFA Europa League Final.

Gera made his Fulham debut in a 2–1 defeat to Hull City on the opening day of the 2008–09 Premier League. Minutes after coming off the bench, he scored Fulham's second goal in a 2–0 win against league leaders Manchester United. During the 2009–10 Premier League season, Gera scored his first goal of the season against West Ham United in a 2–2 draw. On 28 December 2009, Gera scored his second goal of the season at Stamford Bridge against Chelsea, when he hooked the ball over Petr Čech from 12 yards after four minutes. Despite this early goal, Fulham lost the game 2–1. Gera went on to score two goals in a man of the match performance against Juventus, Fulham winning 4–1. He scored the goal which sent Fulham to its first ever European final in a 2–1 victory against Hamburger SV; while Fulham lost the final 2–1, Gera did provide the sole goal's assist. Having scored ten goals in all competitions, Gera was voted the fans' player of the season for Fulham's 2009–10 season.

Gera started the 2010–11 season by scoring a hat-trick after coming off the bench in the 66th minute against Werder Bremen in a 5–1 friendly win, and a brace against Port Vale in the second round of the League Cup. His first league goal of the new campaign, a 30-yard volley which deflected off the post and then off the goalkeeper, came at The Hawthorns against former club West Brom. Despite this, Fulham manager Mark Hughes did not regularly start Gera, despite him being a fan favourite, instead using him sparingly as a substitute. Gera was sent off in Fulham's final match of the 2010–11 Premier League season on 22 May 2011, a 2–2 draw against Arsenal. This was the first red card Fulham had received all season and it nearly cost them a place in the Europa League through UEFA's Fair Play League, but Fulham finished ahead of closest challengers Blackpool by 0.01 points to win the qualifying berth.

On 16 June 2011, Fulham announced that Gera was available on a free transfer as one of three players that were being released by the club Subsequently, Gera looked to rejoin his former club West Brom.

=== Return to West Bromwich Albion ===
On 2 August 2011, West Brom boss Roy Hodgson announced that the club had signed Gera on a two-year deal. On 5 November 2011, he made his second debut for West Brom as a starter in a 3–0 loss to Arsenal. After three first team appearances, Gera was injured in a 3–1 defeat against Tottenham Hotspur on 26 November 2011; he was unavailable for the remainder of the season. After nine months out due to his injury, Gera returned to the starting lineup against Liverpool on the first day of the 2012–13 Premier League season, opening the scoring with a volley from 25 yards, leading to a 3–0 win. On 8 January 2013, it was confirmed Gera would be out injured for the rest of the season after he injured a knee in a game against Queens Park Rangers. On 1 July 2013, Gera's contract with West Brom expired, making him a free agent for a short period until he signed a new contract for another year with the club. Gera left West Brom in 2014 after his contract expired.

=== Ferencváros ===
On 2 April 2016, Gera became Hungarian League champion with Ferencváros after losing to Debreceni VSC 2–1 at the Nagyerdei Stadion in the 2015–16 Nemzeti Bajnokság I season.

He scored the only and winning goal in the 2016 Magyar Kupa Final on 7 May 2016 against archrival Újpest FC at the Groupama Arena.

== International career ==
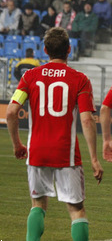
Zoltán Gera playing for Hungary in November 2011

Gera earned his first international cap for the Hungary national team on 13 February 2002 in a 2–1 defeat to Switzerland. Up to 2009, he had played 63 games for Hungary, scoring 18 goals. Before the 2010 FIFA World Cup qualification match on 14 October 2009 against Denmark, Gera was excluded from the match squad by coach Erwin Koeman after he arrived late at a team meeting. Following the incident, Gera announced his retirement from the national team. On 23 July 2010, the newly appointed board of the Hungarian Football Federation terminated the contract of Koeman and appointed Sándor Egervári as the new national team coach. After a personal discussion with Egervári, Gera returned to the national team on 11 August 2010 against England.

On 29 March 2011, Gera scored twice against the Netherlands in the Amsterdam Arena in front of 51,700 spectators in a UEFA Euro 2012 qualifying match. He scored the first goal in the 50th minute and his second goal in the 75th minute. Gera's goals, however, were not enough as Hungary lost 5–3. On 7 September 2012, Hungary started their 2014 World Cup qualifying campaign with a 5–0 win in Andorra; Gera scored the second goal. On 16 October 2012, Hungary beat Turkey at home 3–1. Gera scored the third Hungarian goal.

On 31 May 2016, Gera was selected as vice-captain for the Hungarian squad for Euro 2016 in France. On 14 June, Gera played in the first group match in a 2–0 victory over Austria at the Nouveau Stade de Bordeaux in Hungary's first match of the tournament. Four days later, on 18 June, he played in a 1–1 draw against Iceland at the Stade Vélodrome, Marseille. On 22 June, he played in the last group match in a 3–3 draw against Portugal at the Parc Olympique Lyonnais, Lyon, and scored the first goal with a terrific half-volley from 25 yards out with his weaker foot. In so doing, he became the second-oldest goalscorer and the oldest goalscorer from open play at a European Championship, aged 37 years and 62 days; Austria's Ivica Vastić is the oldest scorer, at 38 years and 257 days, when he converted a penalty at Euro 2008. Gera's goal was later voted the "Goal of the Tournament" in a UEFA online fan poll.

== Managerial career ==
=== Hungary U-21 ===
In 2019, he was appointed as the head coach of Hungary national under-21 football team. On 6 September 2019, he debuted with a goalless draw against Denmark.

On 26 February 2024, he resigned as the head coach of the U21 team.

=== Vasas ===
He was appointed as the manager of Nemzeti Bajnokság II club Vasas SC on 26 February 2024. Vasas could not get promoted to the first division due to a defeat against Győr in the penultimats match day of the 2023–24 Nemzeti Bajnokság II season.

On 21 August 2024, he was removed from his position at Vasas. Vasas appointed Attila Pintér instead of him.

=== Kecskemét ===
On 16 October 2024, he was appointed as the Nemzeti Bajnokság I club Kecskeméti TE. In an interview published by Nemzeti Sport, he said that he is aware of the risks of being the coach of Kecskemét. His debut ended with a 3-0 defeat against Puskás Akadémia FC at the Széktói Stadion on 20 October 2024.

== Personal life ==
Gera married on 19 June 2004; his wife gave birth to a boy named Szabolcs on 15 March 2008. Following the birth, he was given leave by his national team manager Péter Várhidi to miss Hungary's friendly against Slovenia to spend time with his family. In 2005, Gera featured in a television advertisement for Pepsi representing the 2006 World Cup, alongside Thierry Henry, David Beckham, Roberto Carlos, Ronaldinho, Nicklas Bendtner, Neil Ruddock and Raúl.

Gera is a member of the Faith Church and was featured in billboard advertisements promoting the organization. He has often defended the Church from its critics and promoted it several times in the media. He credits the Church with saving his life, helping him change his destructive lifestyle which included crime and drug abuse.

== Career statistics ==
=== Club ===
Appearances and goals by club, season and competition
Club	Season	League			National cup (Note: Includes Magyar Kupa, FA Cup)		League cup (Note: Includes Football League Cup, Ligakupa)		Europe		Other		Total	
Club	Season	Division	Apps	Goals	Apps	Goals	Apps	Goals	Apps	Goals	Apps	Goals	Apps	Goals
Pécsi MFC	1997–98	Bajnokság II	25	2	0	0	—		—		—		25	2
Pécsi MFC	1998–99	Bajnokság II	31	8	0	0	—		—		—		31	8
Pécsi MFC	1999–2000	Bajnokság I	15	4	0	0	—		—		—		15	4
Pécsi MFC	Total		71	14	0	0	—		—		—		71	14
Ferencváros	2000–01	Bajnokság I	32	7	3	0	—		—		—		35	7
Ferencváros	2001–02	Bajnokság I	27	8	0	0	—		2 (Note: Appearance(s) in UEFA Champions League)	0	—		29	8
Ferencváros	2002–03	Bajnokság I	26	6	3	0	—		6 (Note: Appearances in UEFA Cup)	1	—		35	7
Ferencváros	2003–04	Bajnokság I	30	11	4	5	—		3	1	—		37	17
Ferencváros	2004–05	Bajnokság I	—		—		—		1	0	—		1	0
Ferencváros	Total		115	32	10	5	—		11	2	—		137	39
West Bromwich Albion	2004–05	Premier League	38	6	3	0	1	0	—		—		42	6
West Bromwich Albion	2005–06	Premier League	15	2	1	1	0	0	—		—		16	3
West Bromwich Albion	2006–07	Championship	40	5	3	1	2	0	—		3 (Note: Appearances in Football League Championship play-offs)	0	48	6
West Bromwich Albion	2007–08	Championship	43	8	5	1	1	1	—		—		49	10
West Bromwich Albion	Total		136	21	12	3	4	1	0	0	3	0	155	25
Fulham	2008–09	Premier League	32	2	4	0	2	1	—		—		38	3
Fulham	2009–10	Premier League	27	2	4	1	1	1	18 (Note: Appearances in UEFA Europa League)	6	—		50	10
Fulham	2010–11	Premier League	27	1	3	1	2	2	—		—		32	4
Fulham	Total		86	5	11	2	5	4	18	6	—		120	17
West Bromwich Albion	2011–12	Premier League	3	0	0	0	0	0	—		—		3	0
West Bromwich Albion	2012–13	Premier League	16	4	1	0	1	0	—		—		18	4
West Bromwich Albion	2013–14	Premier League	14	0	1	0	0	0	—		—		15	0
West Bromwich Albion	Total		33	4	2	0	1	0	—		—		36	4
Ferencváros	2014–15	Bajnokság I	26	3	3	0	1	0	—		—		30	3
Ferencváros	2015–16	Bajnokság I	30	4	5	3	—		4	2	0	0	39	9
Ferencváros	2016–17	Bajnokság I	29	8	6	1	—		2	1	—		37	10
Ferencváros	2017–18	Bajnokság I	4	0	0	0	—		4	0	—		8	0
Ferencváros	Total		89	15	14	4	1	0	10	3	0	0	114	22
Career total			528	91	49	14	11	5	39	11	3	0	631	121

=== International ===
Appearances and goals by national team and year
National team	Year	Apps	Goals
Hungary	2002	8	3
Hungary	2003	6	2
Hungary	2004	13	2
Hungary	2005	6	2
Hungary	2006	7	3
Hungary	2007	10	3
Hungary	2008	7	2
Hungary	2009	6	1
Hungary	2010	5	1
Hungary	2011	5	2
Hungary	2012	4	2
Hungary	2013	0	0
Hungary	2014	3	1
Hungary	2015	6	0
Hungary	2016	10	2
Hungary	2017	1	0
Total		97	26

Scores and results list Hungary's goal tally first, score column indicates score after each Gera goal.

List of international goals scored by Zoltán Gera
No.	Date	Venue	Opponent	Cap	Score	Result	Competition
1	16 October 2002	Szusza Ferenc Stadion, Budapest, Hungary	San Marino	7	1–0	3–0	UEFA Euro 2004 qualifying
2	16 October 2002	Szusza Ferenc Stadion, Budapest, Hungary	San Marino	7	2–0	3–0	UEFA Euro 2004 qualifying
3	16 October 2002	Szusza Ferenc Stadion, Budapest, Hungary	San Marino	7	3–0	3–0	UEFA Euro 2004 qualifying
4	30 April 2003	Puskás Ferenc Stadion, Budapest, Hungary	Luxembourg	9	1–0	5–1	Friendly
5	7 June 2003	Szusza Ferenc Stadion, Budapest, Hungary	Latvia	10	3–1	3–1	UEFA Euro 2004 qualifying
6	8 September 2004	Szusza Ferenc Stadion, Budapest, Hungary	Iceland	25	1–1	3–2	2006 FIFA World Cup qualification
7	17 November 2004	Ta' Qali Stadium, Ta' Qali, Malta	Malta	27	1–0	2–0	2006 FIFA World Cup qualification
8	4 June 2005	Laugardalsvöllur, Reykjavík, Iceland	Iceland	30	1–1	3–2	2006 FIFA World Cup qualification
9	4 June 2005	Laugardalsvöllur, Reykjavík, Iceland	Iceland	30	2–1	3–2	2006 FIFA World Cup qualification
10	16 August 2006	UPC-Arena, Graz, Austria	Austria	36	1–0	2–1	Friendly
11	2 September 2006	Szusza Ferenc Stadion, Budapest, Hungary	Norway	37	1–4	1–4	UEFA Euro 2008 qualifying
12	6 September 2006	Bilino Polje, Zenica, Bosnia and Herzegovina	Bosnia and Herzegovina	38	2–0	3–1	UEFA Euro 2008 qualifying
13	28 March 2007	Szusza Ferenc Stadion, Budapest, Hungary	Moldova	42	2–0	2–0	UEFA Euro 2008 qualifying
14	22 August 2007	Puskás Ferenc Stadion, Budapest, Hungary	Italy	45	2–1	3–1	Friendly
15	8 September 2007	Stadion Sóstói, Székesfehérvár, Hungary	Bosnia and Herzegovina	46	1–0	1–0	UEFA Euro 2008 qualifying
16	6 February 2008	Tsirion Stadium, Limassol, Cyprus	Slovakia	51	1–0	1–1	Friendly
17	19 November 2008	Windsor Park, Belfast, Northern Ireland	Northern Ireland	57	2–0	2–0	Friendly
18	1 April 2009	Puskás Ferenc Stadion, Budapest, Hungary	Malta	60	2–0	3–0	2010 FIFA World Cup qualification
19	8 October 2010	Puskás Ferenc Stadion, Budapest, Hungary	San Marino	67	8–0	8–0	UEFA Euro 2012 qualifying
20	29 March 2011	Amsterdam Arena, Amsterdam, Netherlands	Netherlands	71	2–1	3–5	UEFA Euro 2012 qualifying
21	29 March 2011	Amsterdam Arena, Amsterdam, Netherlands	Netherlands	71	3–3	3–5	UEFA Euro 2012 qualifying
22	7 September 2012	Estadi Comunal, Andorra la Vella, Andorra	Andorra	74	2–0	5–0	2014 FIFA World Cup qualification
23	16 October 2012	Puskás Ferenc Stadion, Budapest, Hungary	Turkey	77	3–1	3–1	2014 FIFA World Cup qualification
24	14 November 2014	Groupama Arena, Budapest, Hungary	Finland	80	1–0	1–0	UEFA Euro 2016 qualifying
25	22 June 2016	Parc Olympique Lyonnais, Lyon, France	Portugal	92	1–0	3–3	UEFA Euro 2016
26	13 November 2016	Groupama Arena, Budapest, Hungary	Andorra	96	1–0	4–0	2018 FIFA World Cup qualification

=== Managerial ===
As of 16 April 2022

Team	Nat	From	To	Record				
Team	Nat	From	To	G	W	D	L	Win %
Hungary U21	(Hungary)	7 June 2019	Present	18	4	4	10	22.22
Total				18	4	4	10	22.22

== Honours ==
Ferencváros

- Nemzeti Bajnokság I: 2000–01, 2003–04, 2015–16
- Magyar Kupa: 2002–03, 2003–04, 2014–15, 2015–16, 2016–17
- Ligakupa: 2014–15
- Szuperkupa: 2004, 2015, 2016

West Bromwich Albion

- Football League Championship: 2007–08

Fulham

- UEFA Europa League runner-up: 2009–10

Individual

- Tibor Simon Award: 2003
- Hungarian Footballer of the Year: 2004 & 2005
- Fulham Player of the Year: 2009–10
- UEFA Euro 2016 Fan's Goal of the Tournament
