= 1994–95 Magyar Kupa =

Tournament details
- Country: Hungary

Final positions
- Champions: Ferencváros
- Runners-up: Vác

The 55th season of the Magyar Kupa (English: Hungarian Cup), Hungary's annual knock-out cup football competition, was played in 1994–95.

== Quarter-finals ==
Team 1	Agg.	Team 2	1st leg	2nd leg
Pécsi	6–4	Stadler	3–2	3–2
Vác	3–2	Békéscsaba	1–1	2–1
Kispest Honvéd	3–2	Újpest	2–0	1–2 (a.e.t.)
BVSC	4–5	Ferencváros	4–2	0–3

== Semi-finals ==
Team 1	Agg.	Team 2	1st leg	2nd leg
Vác	2–0	Pécsi	2–0	0–0
Kispest Honvéd	2–4	Ferencváros	1–1	1–3

== Final ==
31 May 1995
20:00 (UTC+2)

Ferencváros	2–0	Vác
Nagy 60'; Czéh 87'	Report

Üllői úti stadion, Budapest
Attendance: 8,000
Referee: Sándor Puhl (Hungary)
21 June 1995
20:00 (UTC+2)

Vác	3–4	Ferencváros
Nyikos 11'; Víg 16' 38'	Report	Lipcsei 39' 60' 72'; Keller 75'

Ligeti stadion, Vác
Attendance: 8,000
Referee: László Vágner (Hungary)

== See also ==
- 1994–95 Nemzeti Bajnokság I
