= Csaba Földvári =

Hungarian footballer (born 1980)

Personal information
- Date of birth: 21 October 1980 (age 46)
- Place of birth: Baja, Hungary
- Height: 1.79 m (5 ft 10 in)
- Positions: Defender; midfielder

Youth career
- –1996: Baja

Senior career*
| Years | Team | Apps | (Gls) |
| 1996–1999 | Baja | 48 | (23) |
| 1999–2003 | Ferencváros | 30 | (1) |
| 2001–2002 | → Kaposvár (loan) | 3 | (0) |
| 2002 | → ESMTK (loan) | 6 | (0) |
| 2003–2004 | BKV Előre | 44 | (8) |
| 2004–2005 | Sopron | 21 | (0) |
| 2005–2007 | Rákospalota | 31 | (2) |
| 2007–2009 | Marchtrenk | 47 | (3) |
| 2009–2010 | Grieskirchen | 12 | (0) |
| 2009 | Grieskirchen 1b | 1 | (0) |
| 2010–2012 | Marchtrenk | 8 | (0) |
| 2012–2014 | Gschwandt | 14 | (1) |
| 2015–2016 | Marchtrenk 1b | 22 | (2) |
| 2017 | Alkoven | 0 | (0) |
| Total | | 287 | (40) |

International career
| 1994–1995 | Hungary U15 | 3 | (0) |
| 2000 | Hungary U21 | 1 | (0) |
- * Club domestic league appearances and goals

Csaba Földvári (born 21 October 1980) is a Hungarian former professional footballer who played as a defender and midfielder. He represented Hungary at under-15 and under-21 level.

== Career statistics ==
=== Club ===
Appearances and goals by club, season and competition
| Club | Season | League | | | National cup (Note: Includes Magyar Kupa, Austrian Cup) | | Other | | Total | |
| Club | Season | Division | Apps | Goals | Apps | Goals | Apps | Goals | Apps | Goals |
|---|---|---|---|---|---|---|---|---|---|---|
| Baja | 1996–97 | Nemzeti Bajnokság III | 19 | 2 | — | | — | | 19 | 2 |
| Baja | 1997–98 | Nemzeti Bajnokság III | | 10 | — | | — | | | 10 |
| Baja | 1998–99 | Nemzeti Bajnokság III | 29 | 11 | — | | — | | 29 | 11 |
| Baja | Total | | 48 | 23 | — | | — | | 48 | 23 |
| Ferencváros | 1999–2000 | Nemzeti Bajnokság I | 9 | 1 | — | | — | | 9 | 1 |
| Ferencváros | 2000–01 | Nemzeti Bajnokság I | 20 | 0 | 2 | 0 | — | | 22 | 0 |
| Ferencváros | 2001–02 | Nemzeti Bajnokság I | 1 | 0 | — | | — | | 1 | 0 |
| Ferencváros | Total | | 30 | 1 | 2 | 0 | — | | 32 | 1 |
| Kaposvár (loan) | 2001–02 | Nemzeti Bajnokság II | 3 | 0 | — | | — | | 3 | 0 |
| ESMTK (loan) | 2001–02 | Nemzeti Bajnokság II | 6 | 0 | — | | — | | 6 | 0 |
| BKV Előre | 2002–03 | Nemzeti Bajnokság II | 14 | 5 | 2 | 0 | — | | 16 | 5 |
| BKV Előre | 2003–04 | Nemzeti Bajnokság II | 30 | 3 | 4 | 0 | — | | 34 | 3 |
| BKV Előre | Total | | 44 | 8 | 6 | 0 | — | | 50 | 8 |
| Sopron | 2004–05 | Nemzeti Bajnokság I | 21 | 0 | 5 | 0 | — | | 26 | 0 |
| Rákospalota | 2005–06 | Nemzeti Bajnokság I | 19 | 2 | 0 | 0 | — | | 19 | 2 |
| Rákospalota | 2006–07 | Nemzeti Bajnokság I | 12 | 0 | — | | — | | 12 | 0 |
| Rákospalota | Total | | 31 | 2 | 0 | 0 | — | | 31 | 2 |
| Marchtrenk | 2006–07 | Landesliga Ost | 12 | 3 | — | | — | | 12 | 3 |
| Marchtrenk | 2007–08 | Landesliga Ost | 26 | 0 | — | | — | | 26 | 0 |
| Marchtrenk | 2008–09 | Landesliga Ost | 9 | 0 | — | | — | | 9 | 0 |
| Marchtrenk | Total | | 47 | 3 | — | | — | | 47 | 3 |
| Grieskirchen | 2009–10 | OÖ Liga | 12 | 0 | 2 | 0 | 1 (Note: Appearance in Landescup) | 0 | 15 | 0 |
| Grieskirchen 1b | 2009–10 | 2. Mittewest | 1 | 0 | — | | — | | 1 | 0 |
| Marchtrenk | 2009–10 | Landesliga Ost | 8 | 0 | — | | — | | 8 | 0 |
| Marchtrenk | 2011–12 | Landesliga Ost | — | | — | | 1 | 0 | 1 | 0 |
| Marchtrenk | Total | | 8 | 0 | — | | 1 | 0 | 9 | 0 |
| Gschwandt | 2012–13 | Bezirksliga Süd | 13 | 1 | — | | — | | 13 | 1 |
| Gschwandt | 2013–14 | Bezirksliga Süd | 1 | 0 | — | | — | | 1 | 0 |
| Gschwandt | Total | | 14 | 1 | — | | — | | 14 | 1 |
| Marchtrenk 1b | 2013–14 | 2. Südost | 22 | 2 | — | | — | | 22 | 2 |
| Career total | | | 287 | 40 | 15 | 0 | 2 | 0 | 304 | 40 |

=== International ===
Appearances and goals by national team and year
| Team | Year | Total | |
| Team | Year | Apps | Goals |
|---|---|---|---|
| Hungary U15 | 1994 | 2 | 0 |
| Hungary U15 | 1995 | 1 | 0 |
| Hungary U15 | Total | 3 | 0 |
| Hungary U21 | 2000 | 1 | 0 |
| Career total | | 4 | 0 |

== Honours ==
Ferencváros

- Nemzeti Bajnokság I: 2000–01

Sopron

- Magyar Kupa: 2004–05
