= Aleksandar Jović =

Serbian footballer and manager

Aleksandar Jović Александар Јовић
Personal information
- Date of birth: 13 April 1972 (age 54)
- Place of birth: Belgrade, SFR Yugoslavia
- Height: 1.81 m (5 ft 11 in)
- Position: Striker

Team information
- Current team: Haladás (manager)

Youth career
- Red Star Belgrade

Senior career*
Years	Team	Apps	(Gls)
1992–1995	Železnik	30	(15)
1995–1998	Čukarički	86	(26)
1996	→ PAOK (loan)	12	(2)
1998–1999	Hansa Rostock	0	(0)
1999	→ Hapoel Haifa (loan)	13	(3)
1999	Kickers Offenbach	4	(0)
2000–2001	Carl Zeiss Jena	45	(20)
2001–2004	Ferencváros	56	(13)

International career
1998	FR Yugoslavia	1	(0)

Managerial career
- 2010: Čukarički
- 2017: Sinđelić Beograd
- 2020–2021: Gorica
- 2022: Serbia U19
- 2022–2023: Serbia U16
- 2023–: Haladás
- * Club domestic league appearances and goals

Aleksandar Jović (Serbian Cyrillic: Александар Јовић; born 13 April 1972) is a Serbian professional football manager and former player who is the manager of Hungarian team Haladás.

== Honours ==
Hapoel Haifa

- Israeli Championship: 1998–99

Ferencváros

- Hungarian Championship: 2003–04
- Hungarian Cup: 2002–03, 2003–04
