= József Somogyi =

Hungarian footballer

Personal information
- Full name: József Somogyi
- Date of birth: 23 May 1968 (age 58)
- Place of birth: Hungary
- Height: 1.84 m (6 ft 0 in)
- Position: Midfielder

Senior career*
Years	Team	Apps	(Gls)
1985–1990	Győri ETO	118	(9)
1991–1992	Siófok	10	(0)
1992–1994	Csepel	41	(9)
1994–1995	Yukong Elephants	35	(5)
1995–1996	Csepel	2	(0)
1996–1997	Bucheon SK	38	(11)
1997–1999	Győri ETO	60	(16)
1999–2000	Hapoel Kfar Saba	35	(2)
2000–2003	MATÁV Sopron	95	(16)
2003–2007	SC-ESV Parndorf	75	(1)

International career^{‡}
1991–1999	Hungary	6	(0)
- * Club domestic league appearances and goals as of 6 October 2008 ‡ National team caps and goals as of 6 October 2008

József Somogyi (born 23 May 1968) is a Hungarian football player who has played at attacking midfielder.

== Club career ==
His previous club is Győri ETO, Siófok, Csepel, MATÁV SC Sopron, Yukong Elephants in South Korea, Hapoel Kfar Saba in Israel, and SC-ESV Parndorf in Austria.
