= Zalán Zombori =

Hungarian footballer

Personal information
- Full name: Zalán Zombori
- Date of birth: 25 May 1975 (age 51)
- Place of birth: Pécs, Hungary
- Height: 1.83 m (6 ft 0 in)
- Position: Midfielder

Senior career*
Years	Team	Apps	(Gls)
1993–1994	Vasas SC	1	(0)
1994–1996	Csepel SC	41	(7)
1996–1998	Újpest FC	41	(4)
1998–1999	Vasas SC	42	(2)
1999–2001	FC Fehérvár	24	(7)
2001–2002	Ferencvárosi TC	20	(2)
2002–2003	Budapest Honvéd FC	7	(0)
2003–2004	BFC Siófok	1	(0)
2004–2005	Alki Larnaca	12	(2)
2005–2006	FC Sopron	2	(0)

International career
1995	Hungary	1	(0)
- * Club domestic league appearances and goals

Zalán Zombori (born 25 May 1975 in Pécs) is a Hungarian football player.
