= Péter Lipcsei =

Hungarian footballer and manager (born 1972)

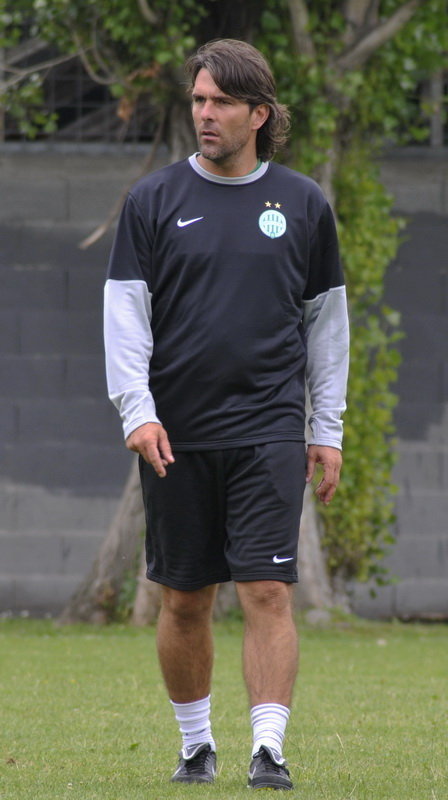

Personal information
- Date of birth: 28 March 1972 (age 54)
- Place of birth: Kazincbarcika, Hungary
- Height: 1.83 m (6 ft 0 in)
- Position: Midfielder

Youth career
- –1990: Kazincbarcika

Senior career*
Years	Team	Apps	(Gls)
1990–1995	Ferencváros	130	(38)
1995–1998	Porto	23	(6)
1996–1997	→ Espinho (loan)	5	(0)
1997–1998	→ Ferencváros (loan)	30	(5)
1998–2000	Austria Salzburg	38	(2)
2000–2010	Ferencváros	268	(58)
Total		494	(109)

International career
1991–2005	Hungary	58	(1)

Managerial career
- 2010–2014: Ferencváros II
- 2014–2017: Ferencváros U21
- 2017–: Soroksár
- * Club domestic league appearances and goals

Péter Lipcsei (born 28 March 1972 in Kazincbarcika) is a Hungarian football manager and former professional player, who played as a midfielder.

== International career ==
Lipcsei made his debut for the Hungary national team in 1991, and gained 58 caps and one goal until 2005.

== Honours ==
Ferencváros

- Nemzeti Bajnokság I: 1991–92, 1994–95, 2000–01, 2003–04
- Nemzeti Bajnokság II (Eastern Group): 2008–09
- Magyar Kupa: 1990–91, 1992–93, 1993–94, 1994–95, 2002–03, 2003–04
- Magyar Szuperkupa: 1993, 1994, 1995, 2004

Porto

- Primeira Divisão: 1995–96

Individual

- UEFA Cup Winners' Cup Top Scorer: 1991–92
- Hungarian Footballer of the Year: 1991, 1995
