= Igor Szkukalek =

Slovak footballer

Personal information
- Full name: Igor Szkukalek
- Date of birth: 1 July 1976 (age 50)
- Place of birth: Dunajská Streda, Czechoslovakia
- Height: 1.78 m (5 ft 10 in)
- Position: Defender

Senior career*
Years	Team	Apps	(Gls)
1996	DAC 1904 Dunajská Streda	7	(0)
1997	FK AS Trenčín	?	(?)
1997–1999	DAC 1904 Dunajská Streda	47	(2)
1999–2000	SFC Opava	29	(0)
2001	FK Drnovice	8	(0)
2001–2005	Ferencvárosi TC	76	(1)
2005	Lombard-Pápa TFC	14	(0)
2006–2007	FK AS Trenčín	26	(1)
2007	DAC 1904 Dunajská Streda	10	(1)
2008–2009	Ferencvárosi TC	17	(2)
2009–2010	Vecsés FC	9	(0)
- * Club domestic league appearances and goals

Igor Szkukalek (born 1 July 1976) is a former Slovak footballer who played for clubs in Slovakia, the Czech Republic and Hungary.

Szkukalek made 37 appearances in the Czech first division for SFC Opava and FK Drnovice. He made 90 appearances in the Hungarian first division with Ferencvárosi TC and Lombard-Pápa TFC.
