= Attila Szili =

Hungarian footballer

Personal information
- Full name: Attila Szili
- Date of birth: 11 March 1978 (age 48)
- Place of birth: Budapest, Hungary
- Height: 1.75 m (5 ft 9 in)
- Position: Midfielder

Youth career
- 1992–1994: Újpest FC

Senior career*
Years	Team	Apps	(Gls)
1994–1996	Újpest FC	17	(0)
1996–1999	TSV 1860 München II	?	(?)
1999–2002	Vasas SC	78	(18)
2002–2003	Ferencvárosi TC	26	(7)
2004–2005	Budapest Honvéd FC	20	(4)
2005–2007	FC Rouen	26	(8)
2007–2009	APEP Pitsilia	25	(5)
2009–2010	Atromitos Yeroskipou	?	(?)
2010	Rákospalotai EAC	6	(0)
2010	Bajai LSE	13	(1)
2011	Union Natternbach	0	(0)

International career
1996–1997	Hungary U-19	9	(3)
1997	Hungary U-20	3	(1)
1998–1999	Hungary U-21	4	(0)
- * Club domestic league appearances and goals

Attila Szili (born 11 March 1978, in Budapest) is a Hungarian football player. He was the captain of the Hungary under-20 team which participated in 1997 FIFA World Youth Championship in Malaysia.
