= Adem Kapič =

Slovenian footballer (born 1975)

Personal information
- Full name: Adem Kapič
- Date of birth: 16 April 1975 (age 51)
- Place of birth: Ljubljana, SFR Yugoslavia
- Height: 1.83 m (6 ft 0 in)
- Position: Midfielder

Senior career*
Years	Team	Apps	(Gls)
1993–1994	Cosmos Ljubljana	19	(0)
1994–1995	Olimpija	1	(0)
1995–1996	GC Biaschesi		
1996–1998	Concordia Ihrhove		
1998–1999	MSV Duisburg	1	(0)
1999	Gorica	2	(0)
1999–2000	Alemannia Aachen	14	(1)
2000–2001	Stuttgarter Kickers	8	(0)
2001–2005	Ferencváros	69	(1)
2005–2006	Beitar Jerusalem	8	(0)
2006	Vasas	11	(0)
2007–2008	Lombard-Pápa	13	(2)

International career
2003–2004	Slovenia	8	(0)
- * Club domestic league appearances and goals

Adem Kapič (born 16 April 1975) is a retired football midfielder.

During his club career, Kapič notably played for MSV Duisburg, Alemannia Aachen, Ferencvárosi TC and Beitar Jerusalem.

== International career ==
Kapič made his debut for Slovenia in an August 2003 friendly match against Hungary, coming on as a 46th-minute substitute for Goran Šukalo, and earned a total of 8 caps, scoring no goals. His final international was a March 2004 friendly against Latvia.
