= Ernő Kardos =

Hungarian footballer

Personal information
- Date of birth: 23 July 1979 (age 47)
- Place of birth: Hungary
- Positions: Midfielder; winger

Senior career*
Years	Team	Apps	(Gls)
-2000	Pécsi MFC	24	(1)
2000–2002	Ferencvárosi TC	8	(0)
2002	Erzsébeti Spartacus MTK LE→(loan)	1	(0)
2002/2003	Győri ETO FC	1	(0)
2003–2004	Komlói Bányász SK		
2004–2006	Kaposvári Rákóczi FC	44	(2)
2007/2008	Komlói Bányász SK	14	(3)
2008–2010	Kaposvölgye VSC	54	(4)
2010/11-2011/12	Bajai LSE	15	(0)
2012/2013	Tardosi FC		(1)
2012-13-2015	Dombóvár FC		
2015–2016	Pécsváradi Spartacus	30	(3)
2016/2017	Mezőcsokonya SE	14	(1)
2017-2019/20	Dombóvár FC	51	(7)
- * Club domestic league appearances and goals

Erno Kardos (born 23 July 1979 in Hungary) is a Hungarian retired footballer.
