= János Hrutka =

Hungarian footballer

Personal information
- Date of birth: 26 October 1974 (age 52)
- Place of birth: Budapest, Hungary
- Height: 1.96 m (6 ft 5 in)
- Position: Defender

Youth career
- Lombik Kobanya

Senior career*
Years	Team	Apps	(Gls)
1993–1994	MTK Hungaria FC	4	(1)
1994–1997	Ferencváros	78	(8)
1997–2000	1. FC Kaiserslautern	17	(1)
2000	Eintracht Frankfurt	0	(0)
2000–2002	Ferencváros	33	(8)
2002	→ Vasas SC (loan)	14	(2)
2002–2003	Budapest Honvéd	14	(0)
Total		160	(20)

International career
1998–2002	Hungary	24	(3)
- * Club domestic league appearances and goals

János Hrutka (born 26 October 1974) is a Hungarian former professional footballer who played as a defender. He represented the Hungary national team internationally between 1998 and 2002.

He was a member of the 1. FC Kaiserslautern team which reached the quarter final of the UEFA Champions League in the 1998–99 season and won the Bundesliga in 1998.

From 2017 to 2021, he served as a pundit for TV2 Group's Spíler TV. In March 2021, Hrutka was fired from the network after he liked a Facebook post by Peter Gulacsi in support of LGBTQ rights in Hungary; media outlets tied the firing to the network's pro-government stances under current owner József Vida.

== Career statistics ==
Scores and results list Hungary's goal tally first, score column indicates score after each Hrutka goal.

List of international goals scored by János Hrutka
No.	Date	Venue	Opponent	Score	Result	Competition
1	27 May 1998	Nyíregyháza, Hungary	Lithuania		1–0	Friendly
2	14 October 1998	Budapest, Hungary	Romania		1–1	UEFA Euro 2000 Qual.
3	28 April 1999	Budapest, Hungary	England		1–1	Friendly
