= Zsolt Szabó (referee) =

Hungarian football referee

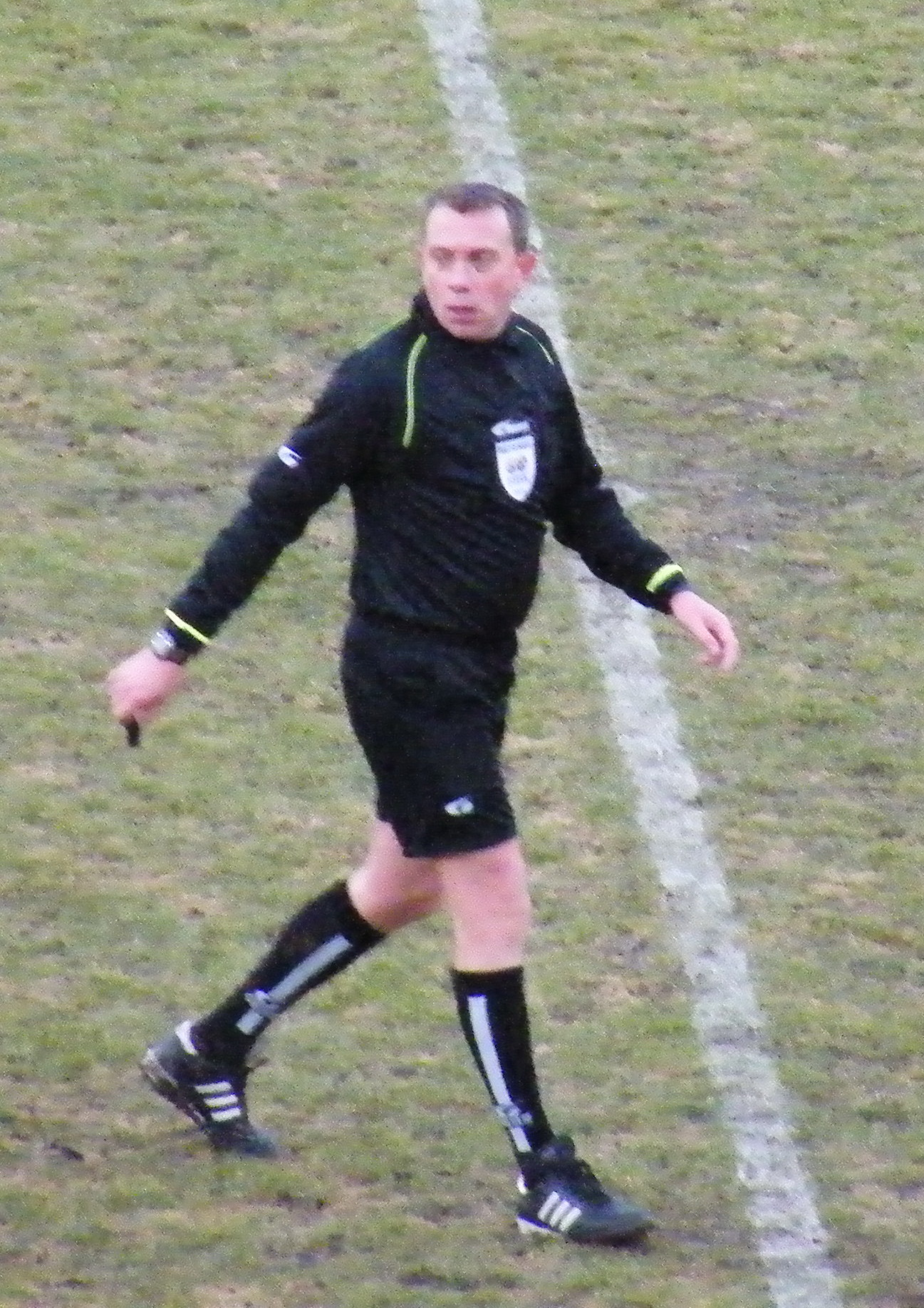
- Zsolt Szabó in 2009
- Born: 1 January 1972 (age 54); Budapest, Hungary
- Other occupation: Auditor

Domestic
Years	League	
1996–	NB I	

International
Years	League	Role
1999–2013	FIFA listed	Referee

Zsolt Szabó (born 1 January 1972) is a Hungarian football referee. He was a full international for FIFA beginning in 1999; as of 2013, however, he was not included on the FIFA list.

Szabó served as a referee in qualification for the 2006 and 2010 World Cup tournaments, in addition to qualifiers for the 2003 FIFA Women's World Cup. He also officiated in qualifiers for the Euro 2004 and Euro 2008 tournaments, the 2002 UEFA European Under-17 Football Championship, and the 2007 UEFA European Under-21 Football Championship.
