= Zoltán Balog (footballer) =

Hungarian footballer (born 1978)

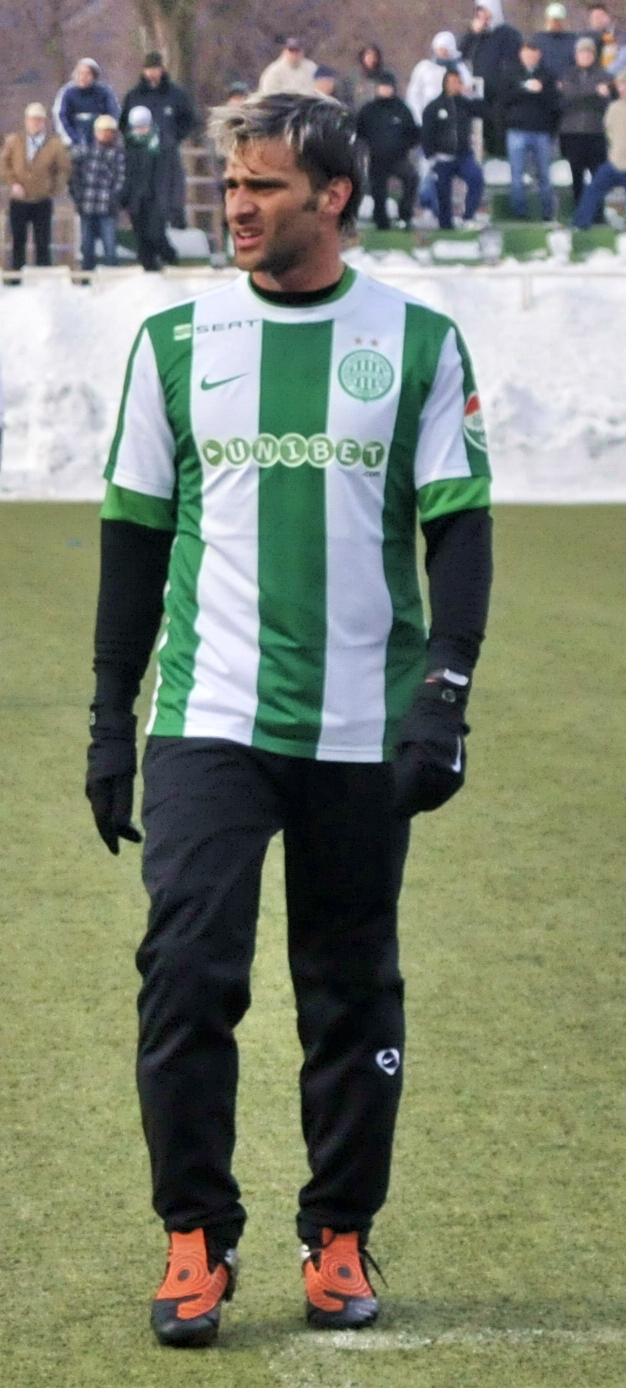

Personal information
- Full name: Zoltán Balog
- Date of birth: 22 February 1978 (age 48)
- Place of birth: Békés, Hungary
- Height: 1.82 m (6 ft 0 in)
- Position: Defender

Senior career*
Years	Team	Apps	(Gls)
1994–1998	Békéscsaba	68	(0)
1998	Royal Antwerp	3	(0)
1999	BVSC	12	(0)
1999–2000	Cegléd	29	(4)
2000–2007	Ferencváros	124	(2)
2007–2008	Viborg	15	(0)
2008–2012	Ferencváros	84	(1)
2012–2015	Gyirmót	65	(2)

International career
1996–1997	Hungary U19	7	(0)
2004–2006	Hungary	6	(0)
- * Club domestic league appearances and goals as of 12 August 2015

Zoltán Balog (born 22 February 1978) is a Hungarian former professional footballer who played as a defender.

== Career ==
=== In Békéscsaba ===
He started playing football at Békéscsabai Előre FC, the purple-white club from Viharsarki was his parent club. He also played his first NB I match there in 1994, when the team from Csaba was in very good places (1-3rd) in the table. He was a key player for the Purples until 1998, when Előre was relegated from the top division due to financial difficulties, and Balog was relegated.

=== Intervening years ===
He joined Royal Antwerp FC in Belgium, but played few games there, so he left after a year, returning to Hungary to join BVSC. He left after a short time, and went to Cegléd the following season. Here, of course, he played in many games and scored 4 goals as a defender.

=== In Ferencváros ===
He was signed by FTC in 2000, and became a stable regular here as time went on. He stayed with the green-whites for a long time, despite financial problems, he only signed in 2007. He played most of his matches for Fradi, scoring two goals and wearing the captain's armband for a few matches. Leaving FTC, he signed for Viborg for one season. He then returned to the green-whites and helped the club return to NB I in the 2008-2009 championship season. He was also a key player for his team in the 2009-10 NB I season. In the summer of 2012, the Ferencváros management did not extend his contract.

== National team ==
Balog made his debut on 31 May 2005, in Metz against France.
