= Attila Dragóner =

Hungarian footballer

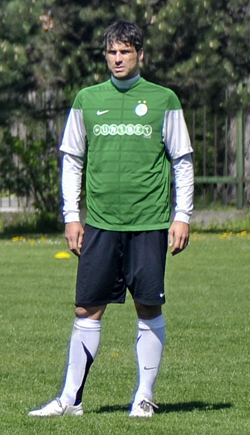

Personal information
- Full name: Attila Dragóner
- Date of birth: 15 November 1974 (age 51)
- Place of birth: Budapest, Hungary
- Height: 1.90 m (6 ft 3 in)
- Position: Full-back

Youth career
- –1994: Budapest Honvéd
- Budafoki LC

Senior career*
Years	Team	Apps	(Gls)
1994–1995	Soproni LC	11	(2)
1995	Veszprémi LC	11	(0)
1996–1997	Stadler FC	32	(3)
1997	BVSC Budapest	23	(2)
1998	Ferencvárosi TC	33	(3)
1998–2000	Fortuna Köln	42	(2)
2000–2004	Ferencvárosi TC	112	(14)
2004–2006	Vitória Guimarães	37	(3)
2006–2011	Ferencvárosi TC	98	(14)

International career
1996–2005	Hungary	28	(0)
- * Club domestic league appearances and goals

Attila Dragóner (born 15 November 1974 in Budapest) is a Hungarian former footballer.

He was a defender for Ferencvárosi Torna Club in Budapest, Hungary. Dragóner was a key player in defence and counterattacking. He played for Ferencvárosi TC, in his native Hungary. He also played for the Hungary national team.

== Honours ==
Ferencvárosi TC

- Nemzeti Bajnokság I: 2001, 2004; Runners-up: 1998, 2002, 2003
- Magyar Kupa: 2003, 2004; Runner-up: 2005
- Szuperkupa: 2004
