= Gábor Vén =

Hungarian footballer

Personal information
- Date of birth: 31 July 1977 (age 49)
- Place of birth: Kalocsa, Hungary
- Height: 1.78 m (5 ft 10 in)
- Position: Midfielder

Senior career*
Years	Team	Apps	(Gls)
1995–1996	Vác FC		
1996–1997	Kecskeméti TE		
1997–1999	Vác FC		
2000–2002	Ferencvárosi TC		
2002	Diósgyőri VTK		
2003	Nyíregyháza Spartacus FC		
2003–2005	Budapest Honvéd FC		
2005	FC Sopron		
2006	Mosonmagyaróvári TE		
2006–2010	Vác FC		
2010–2011	Egri FC		
2011–2015	Jászapáti VSE		
- * Club domestic league appearances and goals

Gábor Vén (born 31 July 1977) is a retired Hungarian football midfielder.
