= Lajos Szűcs (footballer, born 1973) =

Hungarian footballer

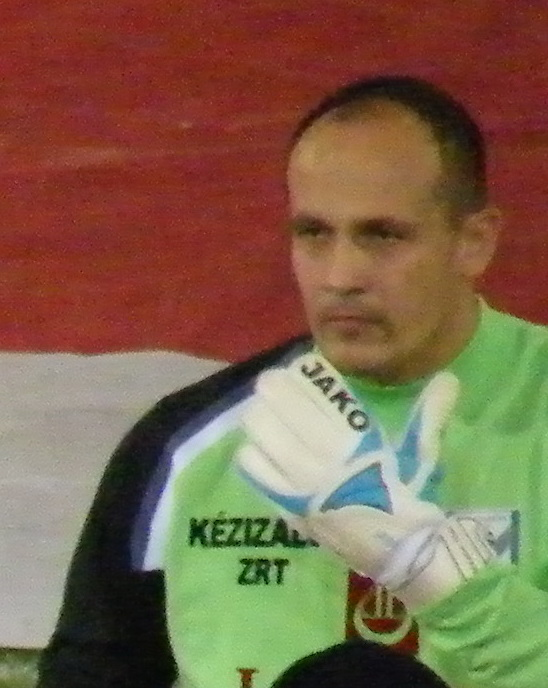
- Szűcs in 2009

Personal information
- Date of birth: 8 August 1973 (age 53)
- Place of birth: Budapest, Hungary
- Height: 1.93 m (6 ft 4 in)
- Position: Goalkeeper

Senior career*
Years	Team	Apps	(Gls)
1993–1997	Újpest	92	(1)
1993-1994	→ Tiszakécske FC (loan)	0	(0)
1997–1999	1. FC Kaiserslautern	3	(0)
1999–2006	Ferencváros	200	(4)
2000	→ 1. FC Kaiserslautern (loan)	0	(0)
2006–2015	Pápa	273	(0)
2015-2016	Dunaújváros	14	(0)
2016	Rákosmenti KSK		
Total		590	(5)

International career
2002–2005	Hungary	3	(0)
- * Club domestic league appearances and goals

Lajos Szűcs (born 8 August 1973) is a Hungarian former professional footballer who played as a goalkeeper. In his career, he played 307 matches in the Hungarian first division and scored five goals. He played three matches in the Bundesliga during 1. FC Kaiserslautern's league-winning campaign of the 1997–98 season.

He is widely criticised by fans of Újpest FC for leaving the club to play for Ferencváros, with whom Újpest's rivalry dates back to the 1930s when Újpest won their first Hungarian League title.

== International career ==
Szűcs was born in Budapest. He made his first appearance in the Hungary national team against Moldova in 2002, then gained two more caps against Japan (2004) and Saudi Arabia (2005).

During the 1995–96 season, Szűcs was a member of the Hungary Olympic football team, which won qualification to the 1996 Summer Olympics in Atlanta. Szűcs was left on the bench all three group games of Hungary. Hungary lost all of their three group matches on the Olympics, their opponent including future gold medal winners Nigeria, and Brazil.

== Honours ==
1.FC Kaiserslautern

- Bundesliga: 1997–98

Ferencváros

- Nemzeti Bajnokság: 2001–02, 2003–04
- Magyar Kupa: 2002–03, 2003–04
