= Gábor Németh =

Hungarian football player

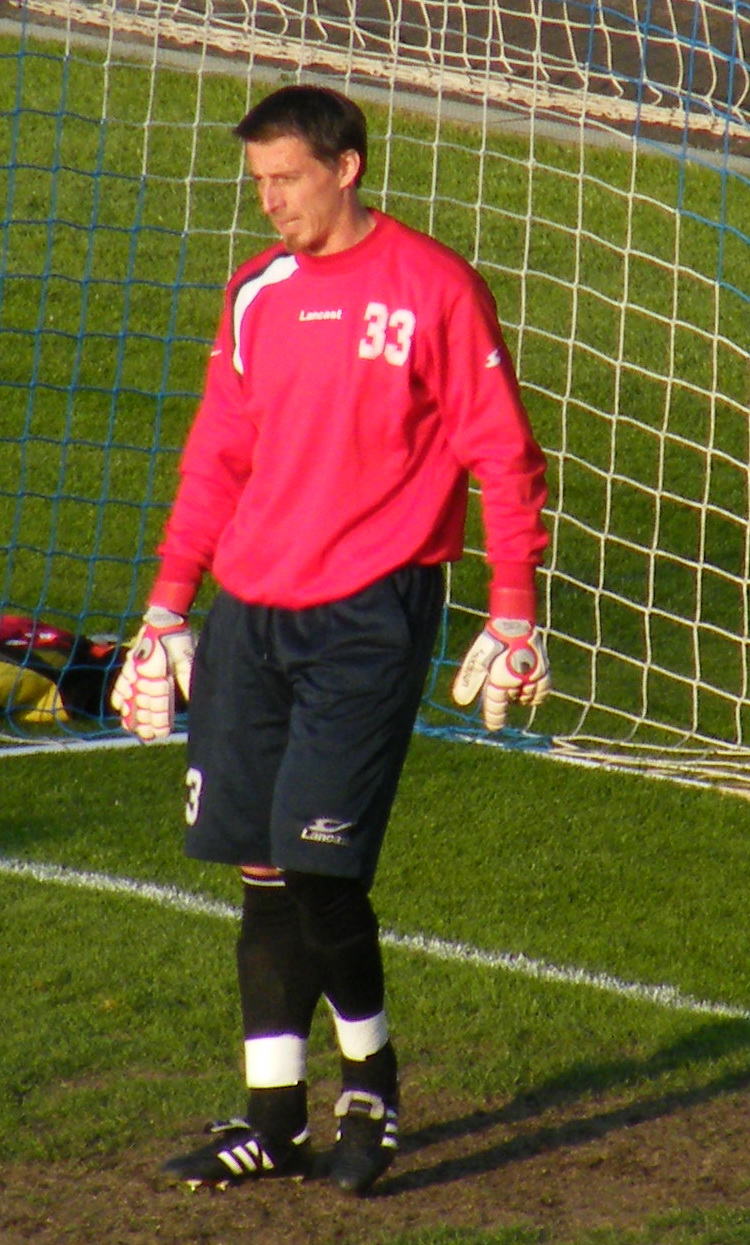
- Gábor Németh Hungarian football player

Personal information
- Date of birth: 21 May 1975 (age 51)
- Place of birth: Szombathely, Hungary
- Height: 1.89 m (6 ft 2 1/2 in)
- Position: Goalkeeper

Team information
- Current team: Répcelaki SE

Senior career*
Years	Team	Apps	(Gls)
1996–1999	Szombathely	45	(0)
1999–2000	Videoton	12	(0)
2000–2002	Ferencváros	9	(0)
2002–2003	Siófok	25	(0)
2003–2005	Pécs	56	(0)
2005–2009	Vasas	102	(0)
2009–2010	Honvéd	23	(0)
2010–2011	Vasas	13	(0)
2011–2013	Kecskemét	26	(0)
2013	Paks	4	(0)
2013–2015	Vasas	27	(0)
2015–2016	Répcelaki SE		
2019–	Répcelaki SE		
- * Club domestic league appearances and goals as of 20 August 2015

Gábor Németh (born 21 May 1975) is a Hungarian football player who plays for Répcelaki SE.

== Club career ==
=== Szombathelyi Haladás ===
Ha made his debut of 4 September 1996 against BVSC Budapest in a match that ended 2–1.

=== Vasas SC ===
He made his debut of 30 July 2005 against Győri ETO FC in a match that ended 1–2.

=== Budapest Honved ===
He made his debut of 25 July 2009 against Kaposvári Rákóczi FC in a match that ended 3–1.

== Club honours ==
=== Videoton FC Fehérvár ===
- Hungarian National Championship II:
  - Winner: 1999–00

=== Ferencvárosi TC ===
- Hungarian National Championship I:
  - Winner: 2000–01
  - Runners-up: 2001–02

=== Vasas SC ===
- Hungarian Cup:
  - Runners-up: 2005–06

=== Budapest Honvéd FC ===
- Hungarian Super Cup:
  - Runners-up: 2009

== Personal life ==
Németh was born on 21 May 1975 in Szombathely, Hungary.
