= Attila Pinte =

Slovak footballer (born 1971)

Personal information
- Date of birth: 6 June 1971 (age 55)
- Place of birth: Šamorín, Czechoslovakia
- Height: 1.80 m (5 ft 11 in)
- Position: Midfielder

Senior career*
Years	Team	Apps	(Gls)
1991–1995	DAC Dunajská Streda	82	(12)
1996–2000	Inter Bratislava	128	(30)
2000–2002	Ferencvárosi TC	52	(9)
2002–2003	Panionios F.C.	8	(2)
2004	Artmedia Petržalka	12	(0)
2004–2006	FC Rimavská Sobota		
2007–2008	FC Senec	20	(2)
2008–2009	DAC Dunajská Streda	15	(2)

International career
1998–2003	Slovakia	31	(1)

Managerial career
- Družstevník Topoľníky (assistant manager)
- TJ Družstevník Vrakúň (assistant manager)
- 2011–2012: FC ŠTK 1914 Šamorín (assistant manager)
- 2012–2015: ŠK SFM Senec (assistant manager)
- 2016: ŠK SFM Senec
- 2017–: Haladás (assistant manager)
- * Club domestic league appearances and goals as of 12 April 2013

Attila Pinte (born 6 June 1971) is a former Slovak football player of Hungarian ethnicity who currently cooperating as an assistant manager for ŠK SFM Senec.

Pinte played in Slovakia most notably for DAC Dunajská Streda and Inter Bratislava. He won the Slovak Superliga with Inter in 2000. He also played for Ferencvárosi TC in Hungary and Panionios F.C. in Greece before returning to Slovakia. Pinte represented Slovakia internationally, scoring once for his nation in 31 appearances.
