= 2002–03 Magyar Kupa =

Tournament details
- Country: Hungary

Final positions
- Champions: Ferencváros
- Runners-up: Debrecen

The 2002–03 Magyar Kupa (English: Hungarian Cup) was the 63rd season of Hungary's annual knock-out cup football competition.

== Quarter-finals ==
Games were played on March 4 and 5, 2003.

Team 1	Score	Team 2
Ferencváros	2–0	Zalaegerszeg
MTK Hungária	3–2	Dunaferr
BKV Előre	1–1 (a.e.t.); 4–2 (pen.)	Siófok
Debrecen	2–0	Sopron

== Semi-finals ==
Games were played on April 15 and 16, 2003.

Team 1	Score	Team 2
Debrecen	6–1	MTK Hungária
BKV Előre	1–2	Ferencváros

== Final ==
6 May 2003
20:00 (UTC+2)

Debrecen	1–2	Ferencváros
Szűcs 43' (o.g.)	Report	Tököli 68', 78'

Puskás Ferenc Stadion, Budapest
Attendance: 10,000
Referee: János Megyebíró (Hungary)

== See also ==
- 2002–03 Nemzeti Bajnokság I
- 2002–03 Nemzeti Bajnokság II
- 2002–03 Nemzeti Bajnokság III
