= József Keller =

Hungarian footballer (born 1965)

Jozsef Keller
Personal information
- Date of birth: 25 September 1965 (age 61)
- Place of birth: Nagykanizsa, Hungary
- Positions: Defender; midfielder

Senior career*
Years	Team	Apps	(Gls)
–1984	Nagykanizsa FC		
1984–1996	Ferencváros	284	(6)
1996–1998	Red Star	69	(1)
1998–2000	Wasquehal Football	59	(1)
2000–2006	Ferencváros	41	(1)
2003–2004	→ Budapest Honvéd (loan)		
2006–2010	Velence SE	78+	(2+)
2010–2011	KITE-Szeged	13	(0)
2011–2012	Kiskundorozsmai ESK	26	(2)

International career
1986–1994	Hungary	29	(0)
- * Club domestic league appearances and goals

József Keller (born 25 September 1965) is a Hungarian former professional footballer who played as a defender or midfielder.
