= 2003–04 Békéscsabai Előre FC season =

Békéscsaba
2003–04 season
- Manager: Attila Supka (until 14 May 2004); Zoltán Németh (from 14 May)
- Stadium: Kórház utcai Stadion
- Nemzeti Bajnokság I: 11th (play-off winners)
- Magyar Kupa: Second round
- Highest home attendance: 12,000 v Ferencváros (9 August 2003, Nemzeti Bajnokság I)
- Lowest home attendance: 400 v Videoton (26 May 2004, Nemzeti Bajnokság I)
- Average home league attendance: 3,144
- Biggest win: 3–1 v Zalaegerszeg (Home, 26 July 2003, Nemzeti Bajnokság I); 2–0 v Győr (Home, 22 November 2003, Nemzeti Bajnokság I); 2–0 v Haladás (Home, 10 April 2004, Nemzeti Bajnokság I); 3–1 v Videoton (Away, 8 May 2004, Nemzeti Bajnokság I); 2–0 v Győr (Home, 19 May 2004, Nemzeti Bajnokság I); 2–0 v Videoton (Home, 26 May 2004, Nemzeti Bajnokság I)
- Biggest defeat: 0–3 v Pécs (Away, 3 August 2003, Nemzeti Bajnokság I); 0–3 v Zalaegerszeg (Away, 17 April 2004, Nemzeti Bajnokság I); 0–3 v Győr (Away, 21 April 2004, Nemzeti Bajnokság I); 0–3 v Pécs (Away, 22 May 2004, Nemzeti Bajnokság I)

The 2003–04 season was Békéscsabai Előre Football Club's 25th competitive season, 2nd consecutive season in the Nemzeti Bajnokság I and 86th season in existence as a football club. In addition to the domestic league, Békéscsaba participated in that season's editions of the Magyar Kupa.

== Squad ==
Note: Flags indicate national team as defined under FIFA eligibility rules; some limited exceptions apply. Players may hold more than one non-FIFA nationality.

No.	Pos.	Nation	Player
1	GK	HUN	Róbert Fekete
2	DF	HUN	Sándor Paróczai
3	DF	HUN	József Bujáki
4	MF	HUN	Viktor Valentényi
5	DF	SCG	Dejan Vilotic
6	MF	HUN	László Megyesi
7	MF	HUN	Attila Simon
8	MF	HUN	Béla Kovács
9	FW	HUN	Richárd Hoffmann
11	MF	HUN	Péter Szeverényi
12	GK	HUN	Zsolt Matkó
13	DF	HUN	Szabolcs Udvari
14	FW	HUN	György Tóth

No.	Pos.	Nation	Player
16	DF	HUN	Sándor Szabó
17	MF	HUN	Zoltán Bánföldi
18	DF	SCG	Duško Grujić
21	DF	HUN	Zsolt Fehér
22	GK	CRO	Žankarlo Šimunić
23	MF	HUN	Zoltán Vincze
24	MF	HUN	Gábor Brlázs
26	MF	HUN	József Ursz
27	MF	HUN	Norbert Kovács
29	FW	ROU	Valentin Miculescu
30	FW	HUN	István Faragó
36	DF	HUN	Szabolcs Schindler
99	FW	RUS	Yeghia Yavruyan

== Competitions ==
=== Overview ===
Competition	First match	Last match	Starting round	Final position	Record							
Competition	First match	Last match	Starting round	Final position	Pld	W	D	L	GF	GA	GD	Win %
Nemzeti Bajnokság I	26 July 2003	26 May 2004	Matchday 1	11th	32	8	8	16	36	50	−14	25.00
Nemzeti Bajnokság I relegation play-offs	2 June 2004	5 June 2004	First leg	Winners	2	2	0	0	3	1	+2	100.00
Magyar Kupa	16 August 2003	16 August 2003	Second round	Second round	1	0	0	1	1	2	−1	0.00
Total					35	10	8	17	40	53	−13	28.57

Source: Competitions

=== Nemzeti Bajnokság I ===
==== Results summary ====
Overall								Home						Away					
Pld	W	D	L	GF	GA	GD	Pts	W	D	L	GF	GA	GD	W	D	L	GF	GA	GD
32	8	8	16	36	50	−14	32	6	6	4	25	18	+7	2	2	12	11	32	−21

==== First stage ====
===== League table =====
Pos	Team	Pld	W	D	L	GF	GA	GD	Pts	Qualification
8	Videoton	22	5	8	9	27	37	−10	23	Qualification for relegation playoff
9	Zalaegerszeg	22	5	5	12	24	35	−11	20	Qualification for relegation playoff
10	Győr	22	5	5	12	23	38	−15	20	Qualification for relegation playoff
11	Békéscsaba	22	4	7	11	23	34	−11	19	Qualification for relegation playoff
12	Haladás	22	3	8	11	12	38	−26	17	Qualification for relegation playoff

Source: rsssf.com

===== Matches =====
26 July 2003 1	Békéscsaba	3–1	Zalaegerszeg	Békéscsaba
18:00 CEST (UTC+2)	N. Kovács 15'; Udvari 35'; Bé. Kovács (yellow card) 45'; Faragó 71'	Report	Csóka (yellow card) 28' (yellow-red card) 78'; Szamosi (yellow card) 38'; Nagy (yellow card) 47'; Sabo 76'	Stadium: Kórház utcai Stadion; Attendance: 3,500; Referee: Béla Kiss; Assistant referees: Nyekita, Ortó

3 August 2003 2	Pécs	3–0	Békéscsaba	Pécs
18:00 CEST (UTC+2)	G. Horváth 10', 24'; Márton (yellow card) 17'; S. Horváth (yellow card) 55'; G. Erős 90'	Report	Bé. Kovács (yellow card) 1'; Faragó (yellow card) 13'; Bujáki (yellow card) 27'; Udvari (yellow card) 45'	Stadium: Stadion PMFC; Attendance: 3,500; Referee: Zsolt Szabó; Assistant referees: Kispál, Lászlai

9 August 2003 3	Békéscsaba	0–0	Ferencváros	Békéscsaba
18:00 CEST (UTC+2)	Vilotic (yellow card) 44'; Valentényi (yellow card) 82'; Bujáki (red card) 90'	Report	G. Kiss (yellow card) 61'; Bognár (yellow card) 63'; Dragóner (yellow card) 73'; D. Rósa (yellow card) 84'	Stadium: Kórház utcai Stadion; Attendance: 12,000; Referee: Attila Juhos; Assistant referees: Hegyi, Tumó

23 August 2003 4	Győr	1–0	Békéscsaba	Győr
20:00 CEST (UTC+2)	Kalina 90'	Report	Udvari (yellow card) 73'	Stadium: Stadion ETO; Attendance: 1,500; Referee: János Makai; Assistant referees: S. Gergely, Sóthy

31 August 2003 5	Békéscsaba	2–2	Haladás	Békéscsaba
17:00 CEST (UTC+2)	Udvari (yellow card) 13'; Bé. Kovács 25'; Faragó 30', (yellow card) 90+1'	Report	V. Farkas (yellow card) 5'; P. Tóth 17' (pen.), (yellow card) 36'; Tüske 53'; Seper (yellow card) 63' (yellow-red card) 70'; Somfalvi (yellow card) 69'	Stadium: Kórház utcai Stadion; Attendance: 4,000; Referee: Attila Hajdó; Assistant referees: Bendik, L. Tóth L.

12 September 2003 6	Siófok	2–0	Békéscsaba	Siófok
18:00 CEST (UTC+2)	Bujáki 13' (o.g.); Mészáros 45'; László (yellow card) 83'	Report	Z. Vincze (yellow card) 34'; Bujáki (yellow card) 45'; Bánföldi (yellow card) 61'; Schindler (yellow card) 90+3'	Stadium: Révész Géza utcai Stadion; Attendance: 500; Referee: Attila Dubraviczky; Assistant referees: T. Ábrahám, J. Balog

20 September 2003 7	Békéscsaba	2–2	Videoton	Békéscsaba
16:00 CEST (UTC+2)	Bánföldi (yellow card) 59'; G. Tóth 69'; Udvari (yellow card) 80'; Miculescu 90'	Report	Hercegfalvi 5'; Koller (yellow card) 6'; B. Tóth (yellow card) 66'; Medveď 76'; Dvéri (yellow card) 90+6'	Stadium: Kórház utcai Stadion; Attendance: 2,000; Referee: Szabolcs Saskőy; Assistant referees: Székely, Hegyi

28 September 2003 8	Békéscsaba	1–2	Debrecen	Békéscsaba
16:00 CEST (UTC+2)	Valentényi (yellow card) 2'; Bé. Kovács 80'	Report	Bajzát 6', 64'; Nikolov (yellow card) 12'; Böőr (yellow card) 53'; Tomić (yellow card) 83'	Stadium: Kórház utcai Stadion; Attendance: 5,000; Referee: Balázs Világi; Assistant referees: Vámos, Ortó

3 October 2003 9	MTK	2–0	Békéscsaba	Budapest
18:00 CEST (UTC+2)	Torghelle 45'; Halmai 54'	Report	Udvari (yellow card) 32'	Stadium: Hidegkuti Nándor Stadion; Attendance: 1,500; Referee: Zoltán Szarka; Assistant referees: Z. Kovács, G. Boda

19 October 2003 10	Békéscsaba	0–1	Újpest	Békéscsaba
14:30 CEST (UTC+2)	Bé. Kovács (penalty missed) 28'	Report	Tamási 7'; Vlaszák (yellow card) 28'; Z. Kovács (yellow card) 45'	Stadium: Kórház utcai Stadion; Attendance: 4,000; Referee: Ferenc Bede; Assistant referees: Harsányi, Vígh

1 November 2003 12	Zalaegerszeg	2–1	Békéscsaba	Zalaegerszeg
17:00 CET (UTC+1)	Csóka 23'; Sabo 82'	Report	Hoffmann 49'; Šimunić (yellow card) 70'; Udvari (yellow card) 90'; Z. Vincze (yellow card) 90+2'	Stadium: ZTE Arena; Attendance: 4,000; Referee: Attila Hanacsek; Assistant referees: T. Kovács, Balog

8 November 2003 13	Békéscsaba	1–0	Pécs	Békéscsaba
13:00 CET (UTC+1)	Simon (yellow card) 20' (yellow-red card) 77'; Bé. Kovács 37' (pen.)	Report	Gaál (yellow card) 23'; Németh (yellow card) 37'; Jokišić (yellow card) 66'	Stadium: Kórház utcai Stadion; Attendance: 1,400; Referee: Zsolt Szabó; Assistant referees: Kispál, Lászlai

15 November 2003 14	Ferencváros	2–0	Békéscsaba	Budapest
16:00 CET (UTC+1)	Sasu 25'; G. Kiss 87'	Report	Grujić (yellow card) 51' (yellow-red card) 59'	Stadium: Üllői úti Stadion; Attendance: 5,534; Referee: Mihály Fábián; Assistant referees: Ortó, I. Tóth

22 November 2003 15	Békéscsaba	2–0	Győr	Békéscsaba
13:00 CET (UTC+1)	Yavruyan 8'; Schindler (yellow card) 17'; Miculescu (yellow card) 22', (goal) 46'	Report	Geri (yellow card) 23'; Kartelo (yellow card) 43'	Stadium: Kórház utcai Stadion; Attendance: 2,000; Referee: Csaba Sápi; Assistant referees: I. Tóth, Vígh

29 November 2003 16	Haladás	1–1	Békéscsaba	Szombathely
16:00 CET (UTC+1)	Tüske (yellow card) 38'; A. Farkas (yellow card) 66'; P. Tóth 71'	Report	Bánföldi (yellow card) 30'; Valentényi (yellow card) 43'; Miculescu 87'	Stadium: Rohonci út Attendance: 2,500; Referee: Ferenc Bede; Assistant referees: T. Gyarmati I, Gergely

6 December 2003 11	Sopron	2–2	Békéscsaba	Sopron
15:00 CET (UTC+1)	Sifter 18', 72'; A. Horváth (yellow card) 58'; Bagoly (yellow card) 75'	Report	Yavruyan 45', (yellow card) 70'; N. Kovács (yellow card) 49'; Bé. Kovács 67'; Z. Vincze (yellow card) 77'	Stadium: Káposztás utcai Stadion; Attendance: 2,000; Referee: Zsolt Szabó; Assistant referees: Tompos, Gaál

6 March 2004 17	Békéscsaba	1–1	Siófok	Békéscsaba
14:00 CET (UTC+1)	G. Tóth 38'; Vilotic (yellow card) 43'	Report	Radics (yellow card) 30'; Hegedűs (yellow card) 32'; Juhász (yellow card) 37', (goal) 48'; Sitku (yellow card) 53'; László (yellow card) 84'	Stadium: Kórház utcai Stadion; Attendance: 3,000; Referee: Zsolt Szabó; Assistant referees: Kispál, I. Tóth

13 March 2004 18	Videoton	1–2	Békéscsaba	Székesfehérvár
18:00 CET (UTC+1)	Ristić (yellow card) 15'; B. Tóth (yellow card) 69'; Grujić 70' (o.g.); Dvéri (yellow card) 90'	Report	Yavruyan 22'; Simon (yellow card) 24'; Z. Vincze 35'; Valentényi (yellow card) 39' (yellow-red card) 44'; Grujić (yellow card) 52'; Šimunić (yellow card) 78'; Bánföldi (yellow card) 88'	Stadium: Sóstói Stadion; Attendance: 2,000; Referee: Balázs Világi; Assistant referees: G. Horváth II, Bóna

20 March 2004 19	Debrecen	1–0	Békéscsaba	Debrecen
18:00 CET (UTC+1)	Dombi 66'; Balog (yellow card) 67'; G. Vincze (yellow card) 73'	Report	Bánföldi (yellow card) 40'	Stadium: Oláh Gábor utcai Stadion; Attendance: 5,500; Referee: József Erdős; Assistant referees: Kelemen, Kujbus

27 March 2004 20	Békéscsaba	1–2	MTK	Békéscsaba
15:00 CET (UTC+1)	G. Tóth 6'; Hoffmann (yellow card) 90'	Report	Torghelle (yellow card) 24', (goal) 47'; Zabos 43'	Stadium: Kórház utcai Stadion; Attendance: 2,000; Referee: Attila Ábrahám; Assistant referees: Z. Szabó, Heibl

3 April 2004 21	Újpest	3–1	Békéscsaba	Budapest
18:00 CEST (UTC+2)	Bükszegi 9'; B. Farkas 42'; Rajczi 87'	Report	Vilotic (red card) 70'; Szeverényi 85'	Stadium: Szusza Ferenc Stadion; Attendance: 2,284; Referee: Tamás Arany; Assistant referees: Gaál, Kelemen

7 April 2004 22	Békéscsaba	3–3	Sopron	Békéscsaba
16:00 CEST (UTC+2)	Szeverényi 14'; Bánföldi (yellow card) 18'; Bé. Kovács 33', 82' (pen.)	Report	Vasas 16', 73'; Balaskó 48'; Sira (red card) 74'; A. Horváth (yellow card) 90'	Stadium: Kórház utcai Stadion; Attendance: 1,500; Referee: Péter Solymosi; Assistant referees: G. Takács, Bukovics

==== Second stage ====
===== Relegation playoff =====
Pos	Team	Pld	W	D	L	GF	GA	GD	Pts	Relegation
7	Pécs	32	9	13	10	36	37	−1	40	
8	Videoton	32	10	10	12	55	51	+4	40	
9	Zalaegerszeg	32	11	6	15	45	47	−2	39	
10	Győr	32	10	6	16	36	54	−18	36	
11	Békéscsaba (O)	32	8	8	16	36	50	−14	32	Qualification for the relegation play-offs
12	Haladás (O, R)	32	4	11	17	19	63	−44	23	Qualification for the relegation play-offs

Source: rsssf.com
(O) Play-off winners; (R) Relegated

====== Matches ======
10 April 2004 23	Békéscsaba	2–0	Haladás	Békéscsaba
19:00 CEST (UTC+2)	Z. Vincze 5'; Simon (yellow card) 9'; Yavruyan 43', (yellow card) 51'; Szeverényi (yellow card) 54'	Report	A. Farkas (yellow card) 34'; Tüske (yellow card) 49'; Z. Szabó (yellow card) 55'	Stadium: Kórház utcai Stadion; Attendance: 3,000; Referee: Csaba Sápi; Assistant referees: Hegyi, Kispál

17 April 2004 24	Zalaegerszeg	3–0	Békéscsaba	Zalaegerszeg
19:00 CEST (UTC+2)	J. Sebők 28', 60'; O. Vincze 85'	Report		Stadium: ZTE Arena; Attendance: 2,500; Referee: István Vad; Assistant referees: Gaál, T. Vígh

21 April 2004 25	Győr	3–0	Békéscsaba	Győr
19:00 CEST (UTC+2)	Nychenko 45'; Kartelo 50'; Stark (yellow card) 72', (goal) 90+1'; Böjte (yellow card) 73'; Z. Varga II (yellow card) 87'	Report		Stadium: Stadion ETO; Attendance: 500; Referee: Balázs Világi; Assistant referees: Boda, Wenczel

1 May 2004 26	Békéscsaba	1–1	Pécs	Békéscsaba
19:00 CEST (UTC+2)	Szeverényi (yellow card) 45'; Bé. Kovács 72' (pen.); Grujić (yellow card) 90+1'	Report	Kerekes 32', (yellow card) 70'; Koltai (yellow card) 47'	Stadium: Kórház utcai Stadion; Attendance: 2,500; Referee: Mihály Fábián; Assistant referees: Márkus, Bukovics

8 May 2004 27	Videoton	1–3	Békéscsaba	Székesfehérvár
19:00 CEST (UTC+2)	Vochin (yellow card) 52'; Pantić 82'; Ristić (yellow card) 88' (yellow-red card)	Report	Valentényi 31'; Bánföldi (yellow card) 55'; Yavruyan 60', 78'; Bé. Kovács (yellow card) 65'	Stadium: Sóstói Stadion; Attendance: 500; Referee: Csaba Sápi; Assistant referees: G. Erős, A. Kelemen

12 May 2004 28	Haladás	2–1	Békéscsaba	Szombathely
19:00 CEST (UTC+2)	Kaj (yellow card) 31'; Somfalvi 25'; M. Szűcs (yellow card) 40'; A. Farkas (yellow card) 58'; Illés 74'	Report	Miculescu 15'; Szeverényi (yellow card) 20'; Grujić (yellow card) 71'; Simon (yellow card) 78'	Stadium: Rohonci út Attendance: 800; Referee: Péter Solymosi; Assistant referees: Szökrény, I. Mészáros

15 May 2004 29	Békéscsaba	2–3	Zalaegerszeg	Békéscsaba
19:00 CEST (UTC+2)	Bé. Kovács 41' (pen.); Bánföldi (yellow card) 45'; Valentényi (yellow card) 54'; Miculescu 67', (red card) 69'	Report	Gyánó 9'; O. Vincze 32'; Waltner (yellow card) 88'; Sabo 89'; Egressy (yellow card) 90+1'	Stadium: Kórház utcai Stadion; Attendance: 2,500; Referee: József Erdős; Assistant referees: Z. Szabó, L. Tóth L.

19 May 2004 30	Békéscsaba	2–0	Győr	Békéscsaba
19:00 CEST (UTC+2)	Udvari 9'; Bé. Kovács 29' (pen.); Hoffmann (yellow card) 33'; Paróczai (yellow card) 79'; Grujić (yellow card) 90+1'	Report		Stadium: Kórház utcai Stadion; Attendance: 1,500; Referee: Ferenc Bede; Assistant referees: Vígh, Nyekita

22 May 2004 31	Pécs	3–0	Békéscsaba	Pécs
19:00 CEST (UTC+2)	Montvai 28'; Sipos (yellow card) 33'; Kerekes 45'; Koltai 89'	Report	Schindler (yellow card) 36'; Bujáki (yellow card) 44'	Stadium: Stadion PMFC; Attendance: 900; Referee: Tamás Arany; Assistant referees: G. Horváth II, T. Gyarmati I

26 May 2004 32	Békéscsaba	2–0	Videoton	Békéscsaba
18:00 CEST (UTC+2)	G. Tóth 4'; Grujić (yellow card) 55'; Miculescu 77'	Report	Vochin (yellow card) 25'; Hercegfalvi (red card) 38'	Stadium: Kórház utcai Stadion; Attendance: 400; Referee: Mihály Fábián; Assistant referees: A. Kelemen, Bendik

==== Relegation play-offs ====
2 June 2004 First leg	Rákospalota	0–1	Békéscsaba	Budapest
16:00 CEST (UTC+2)		Report	Udvari 47'; G. Tóth (yellow card) 69'	Stadium: Budai II. László Stadion; Attendance: 500; Referee: Attila Ábrahám; Assistant referees: T. Gyarmati, S. Gergely

5 June 2004 Second leg	Békéscsaba	2–1 (3–1 agg.)	Rákospalota	Békéscsaba
19:00 CEST (UTC+2)	Szeverényi 13'; Udvari (yellow card) 41'; Yavruyan (penalty missed) 65'; Simon (yellow card) 69'; G. Tóth 78'; Grujić (yellow card) 84'	Report	Némedi (penalty missed) 26'; Pomper (yellow card) 66'; Ba. Kovács (yellow card) 89'; Nyerges 90+2'	Stadium: Kórház utcai Stadion; Attendance: 2,000; Referee: Attila Hanacsek; Assistant referees: P. Kovács, Bóna
Note: Békéscsaba won 3–1 on aggregate, and therefore both clubs remained in their respective leagues.

=== Magyar Kupa ===
16 August 2003 Second round	Makó	2–1	Békéscsaba	Makó
17:00 CEST (UTC+2)	Hadár 22'; Pálinkó 51'	Report	Z. Vincze (yellow card) 34'; Schindler (yellow card) 38'; Valentényi (yellow card) 70'; S. Szabó 73'	Stadium: Erdei Ferenc téri Sporttelep; Attendance: 800; Referee: Attila Ábrahám; Assistant referees: Heibl, S. Auth
