= 2003–04 Ferencvárosi TC season =

Ferencvárosi TC
2003–04 season
- Chairman: János Furulyás
- Manager: József Garami (until 23 December 2003); Attila Pintér
- Stadium: Üllői úti stadion
- NB 1: Winner
- Hungarian Cup: Winner
- UEFA Cup: First round
- Top goalscorer: League: Zoltán Gera (11); All: Zoltán Gera (17)
- Highest home attendance: 10,516 vs Debrecen (27 May 2004)
- Lowest home attendance: 4,872 vs Haladás (25 October 2003)

The 2003–04 season will be Ferencvárosi TC's102nd competitive season, 102nd consecutive season in the Borsodi Liga and 104th year in existence as a football club.

== Squad ==
As of match played 30 May 2004

No.	Name	Nationality	Position	Date of birth (age)	Signed from	Signed in	Apps.	Goals
Goalkeepers
1	Milán Udvarácz	(Hungary)	GK	9 December 1967 (aged 36)	Kispest-Honvéd	2002	59	0
22	Lajos Szűcs	(Hungary)	GK	8 August 1973 (aged 30)	Kaiserslautern	2000	155	1
35	Kálmán Szabó	(Hungary)	GK	27 July 1980 (aged 23)	youth sector	2003	0	0
Defenders
3	Ákos Takács	(Hungary)	DF	14 February 1982 (aged 22)	youth sector	2003	1	0
4	György Kiss	(Hungary)	DF	22 May 1975 (aged 29)	Dunaferr	2003	24	2
21	Dragan Vukmir	(Serbia and Montenegro)	DF	2 August 1978 (aged 25)	Dinamo Pančevo	2002	65	0
23	Sorin Botiș	(Romania)	DF	14 April 1978 (aged 26)	Sheriff Tiraspol	2003	11	1
24	Gábor Gyepes	(Hungary)	DF	26 June 1981 (aged 22)	youth sector	1999	88	8
26	Attila Dragóner	(Hungary)	DF	15 November 1974 (aged 29)	Fortuna Köln	2000	147	19
78	Zoltán Balog	(Hungary)	DF	22 February 1978 (aged 26)	Cegléd	2000	70	0
79	Zsolt Bognár	(Hungary)	DF	28 March 1979 (aged 25)	Győr	2002	29	1
Midfielders
5	Igor Szkukalek	(Slovakia)	MF	1 July 1976 (aged 27)	Drnovice	2001	76	1
6	Péter Lipcsei	(Hungary)	MF	28 March 1972 (aged 32)	Austria Salzburg	2000	285	67
11	Szabolcs Huszti	(Hungary)	MF	18 April 1983 (aged 21)	youth sector	2003	1	0
13	Tamás Somorjai	(Hungary)	MF	12 January 1980 (aged 24)	youth sector	1999	11	1
14	Tamás Szalai	(Hungary)	MF	12 June 1984 (aged 19)	youth sector	2003	2	0
20	Dénes Rósa	(Hungary)	MF	7 April 1977 (aged 27)	Újpest	2003	25	2
27	Attila Kriston	(Hungary)	MF	6 June 1975 (aged 28)	Siófok	1998	132	7
28	Sándor Károlyi	(Hungary)	MF	12 February 1981 (aged 23)	Győr	2002	3	0
30	Zoltán Gera	(Hungary)	MF	22 April 1979 (aged 25)	Pécs	2000	115	32
51	János Zováth	(Hungary)	MF	25 February 1977 (aged 27)	Dunaferr	2003	27	0
53	Adem Kapič	(Slovenia)	MF	16 April 1975 (aged 29)	Alemannia Aachen	2002	55	1
Forwards
8	Árpád Nógrádi	(Hungary)	FW	14 March 1983 (aged 21)	youth sector	2003	2	0
9	Aleksandar Jović	(Serbia and Montenegro)	FW	13 April 1972 (aged 32)	Carl Zeiss Jena	2001	56	13
10	Leandro	(Brazil)	FW	19 March 1982 (aged 22)	Szombathelyi Haladás	2002	59	7
17	Marius Sasu	(Romania)	FW	1 October 1975 (aged 28)	Kispest-Honvéd	2003	27	5
55	Attila Tököli	(Hungary)	FW	14 May 1976 (aged 28)	Dunaferr	2002	51	23
90	Thomas Sowunmi	(Hungary)	FW	25 July 1978 (aged 25)	Dunaferr	2003	9	0
99	Marek Penksa	(Slovakia)	FW	4 August 1973 (aged 30)	Dunaferr	2002	51	4
Players away on loan
Players who left during the season

== Transfers ==
=== Summer ===
In: Note: Flags indicate national team as defined under FIFA eligibility rules; some limited exceptions apply. Players may hold more than one non-FIFA nationality.

No.	Pos.	Nation	Player
3	DF	HUN	Ákos Takács (from youth sector)
11	MF	HUN	Szabolcs Huszti (from youth sector)
14	MF	HUN	Tamás Szalai (from youth sector)
17	FW	ROU	Marius Sasu (from Kispest-Honvéd)
20	MF	HUN	Dénes Rósa (from Újpest)
23	DF	ROU	Sorin Botiș (from (Moldova) Sheriff Tiraspol)

Out: Note: Flags indicate national team as defined under FIFA eligibility rules; some limited exceptions apply. Players may hold more than one non-FIFA nationality.

No.	Pos.	Nation	Player
8	FW	ROU	Bogdan Andone (to (Cyprus) Apollon Limassol)
9	FW	HUN	Attila Szili (to Budapest Honvéd)
14	MF	HUN	József Keller (to Budapest Honvéd)
18	DF	ROU	Marius Cheregi (Retired)
19	MF	HUN	Tibor Halgas (to Diósgyőr)
31	MF	HUN	Zoltán Varga (to Győr)

=== Winter ===
In: Note: Flags indicate national team as defined under FIFA eligibility rules; some limited exceptions apply. Players may hold more than one non-FIFA nationality.

No.	Pos.	Nation	Player
8	FW	HUN	Árpád Nógrádi (from youth sector)

Out: Note: Flags indicate national team as defined under FIFA eligibility rules; some limited exceptions apply. Players may hold more than one non-FIFA nationality.

No.	Pos.	Nation	Player
11	MF	HUN	Szabolcs Huszti (loan to Sopron)

== Competitions ==
=== Overview ===
Competition	First match	Last match	Starting round	Final position	Record							
Competition	First match	Last match	Starting round	Final position	Pld	W	D	L	GF	GA	GD	Win %
Nemzeti Bajnokság I	26 July 2003	27 May 2004	Matchday 1	Winner	32	16	9	7	44	30	+14	50.00
Hungarian Cup	17 September 2003	5 May 2004	Round of 32	Winner	5	4	1	0	11	5	+6	80.00
UEFA Cup	14 August 2003	15 October 2003	Qualifying round	First round	4	2	2	0	8	2	+6	50.00
Total					41	22	12	7	63	37	+26	53.66

Last updated: 27 May 2004
Source: Competitions

=== Nemzeti Bajnokság I ===
==== First stage ====
Pos	Team	Pld	W	D	L	GF	GA	GD	Pts	Qualification
1	Ferencváros	22	12	8	2	29	15	+14	44	Qualification for championship playoff
2	Siófok	22	12	5	5	24	11	+13	41	Qualification for championship playoff
3	Debrecen	22	11	6	5	34	17	+17	39	Qualification for championship playoff
4	MTK Hungária	22	10	8	4	35	21	+14	38	Qualification for championship playoff
5	Újpest	22	9	8	5	32	22	+10	35	Qualification for championship playoff

Source: rsssf.com

==== Second stage ====
Pos	Team	Pld	W	D	L	GF	GA	GD	Pts	Qualification or relegation
1	Ferencváros (C)	32	16	9	7	44	30	+14	57	Qualification for Champions League second qualifying round
2	Újpest	32	15	11	6	48	29	+19	56	Qualification for UEFA Cup first qualifying round
3	Debrecen	32	16	8	8	51	32	+19	56	Qualification for Intertoto Cup first round
4	Siófok (R)	32	14	8	10	34	24	+10	50	Relegation to Nemzeti Bajnokság II
5	Sopron	32	13	9	10	53	42	+11	48	Qualification for Intertoto Cup first round
6	MTK Hungária	32	11	11	10	42	40	+2	44	

Source: rsssf.com
(C) Champions; (R) Relegated

==== Results summary ====
Overall								Home						Away					
Pld	W	D	L	GF	GA	GD	Pts	W	D	L	GF	GA	GD	W	D	L	GF	GA	GD
32	16	9	7	44	30	+14	57	10	3	3	27	11	+16	6	6	4	17	19	−2

Last updated: 27 May 2004.
Source: NB I

==== Results by round ====
Round	1	2	3	4	5	6	7	8	9	10	11	12	13	14	15	16	17	18	19	20	21	22	23	24	25	26	27	28	29	30	31	32
Ground	A	H	A	H	A	H	A	H	A	A	H	H	A	H	A	H	A	H	A	H	H	A	H	A	H	H	A	A	H	A	A	H
Result	D	D	D	W	D	W	W	W	L	W	W	L	W	W	D	W	D	D	W	D	W	W	W	L	L	L	L	D	W	W	L	W
Position	6	8	9	6	8	6	2	1	4	3	1	1	1	1	2	2	2	1	1	1	1	1	1	1	1	3	3	4	2	1	3	1

Updated to match(es) played on 27 May 2004. Source: Matches
A = Away; H = Home; W = Win; D = Draw; L = Loss

==== Matches ====
26 July 2003 1	Siófok	1–1	Ferencváros	Siófok
20:00 CEST	Csordás 34'	Report	Rósa 47'; Vukmir (yellow card) 69' (yellow-red card) 82'	Stadium: Révész Géza utcai Stadion; Attendance: on closed Referee: Ferenc Bede

2 August 2003 2	Ferencváros	2–2	Videoton	Budapest
20:00 CEST	Hercegfalvi 4'; Dvéri 63' (red card) 72'	Report	Lipcsei 29' (pen.); Rósa 82'	Stadium: Üllői úti stadion Attendance: on closed Referee: Attila Dubraviczky

9 August 2003 3	Békéscsaba	0–0	Ferencváros	Békéscsaba
18:00 CEST	Bujáki (red card) 90+1'	Report		Stadium: Kórház utcai Stadion; Attendance: 12,000; Referee: Attila Juhos

23 August 2003 4	Ferencváros	2–1	MTK Budapest	Budapest
18:00 CEST	Sasu 31'; Gera 62' (pen.)	Report	Torghelle 43'	Stadium: Üllői úti stadion Attendance: on closed Referee: Ferenc Bede

1 September 2003 5	Újpest	1–1	Ferencváros	Budapest
18:00 CEST	Simek 9'	Report	Gera 62' (pen.)	Stadium: Megyeri úti stadion Attendance: 4,522; Referee: Viktor Kassai

14 September 2003 6	Ferencváros	2–0	Sopron	Budapest
18:00 CEST	Jović 17'; Sasu 65'	Report		Stadium: Üllői úti stadion Attendance: on closed Referee: Zoltán Szarka

20 September 2003 7	Zalaegerszeg	1–2	Ferencváros	Zalaegerszeg
18:00 CEST	Sabo 42' (pen.)	Report	Tököli 12'; Leandro 68'	Stadium: ZTE Arena; Attendance: 8,000; Referee: Zsolt Szabó

28 September 2003 8	Ferencváros	3–0	Pécs	Budapest
16:00 CEST	Sasu 2' (pen.); Dragóner 60'; Lipcsei 79'	Report		Stadium: Üllői úti stadion Attendance: 5,111; Referee: Attila Hajdó

5 October 2003 9	Debrecen	5–0	Ferencváros	Debrecen
16:00 CEST	Dombi 12'; Halmosi 37'; Szekeres 43'; Madar 67'; Șumudică 72'	Report		Stadium: Oláh Gábor utcai Stadion; Attendance: 6,500; Referee: Attila Ábrahám

19 October 2003 10	Győr	0–1	Ferencváros	Győr
16:00 CEST		Report	Gera 32'	Stadium: Stadion ETO; Attendance: 5,000; Referee: Tamás Arany

25 October 2003 11	Ferencváros	2–0	Szombathelyi Haladás	Budapest
16:00 CEST	Leandro 75'; Gera 86'	Report		Stadium: Üllői úti stadion Attendance: 4,872; Referee: Csaba Sápi

1 November 2003 12	Ferencváros	0–1	Siófok	Budapest
17:00 CET		Report	Kuttor 26'	Stadium: Üllői úti stadion Attendance: 5,467; Referee: Béla Kiss

8 November 2003 13	Videoton	1–2	Ferencváros	Székesfehérvár
16:00 CET	Dvéri 41'	Report	Dragóner 84'; Tököli 89'	Stadium: Sóstói Stadion; Attendance: 9,200; Referee: Attila Juhos

15 November 2003 14	Ferencváros	2–0	Békéscsaba	Budapest
16:00 CET	Sasu 25'; Kiss 87'	Report	Grujić (red card) 59'	Stadium: Üllői úti stadion Attendance: 5,534; Referee: Mihály Fábián

22 November 2003 15	MTK Budapest	1–1	Ferencváros	Budapest
18:00 CET	Pusztai 20'	Report	Dragóner 67'	Stadium: Hidegkuti Stadion; Attendance: 4,000; Referee: Attila Ábrahám

29 November 2003 16	Ferencváros	2–1	Újpest	Budapest
16:00 CET	Tököli 8'; Gera 58'	Report	Simek 22'	Stadium: Üllői úti stadion Attendance: 10,000; Referee: Attila Dubraviczky

7 March 2004 17	Sopron	0–0	Ferencváros	Sopron
11:30 CET		Report		Stadium: Káposztás utcai Stadion; Attendance: 3,470; Referee: Viktor Kassai

13 March 2004 18	Ferencváros	0–0	Zalaegerszeg	Budapest
18:00 CET		Report		Stadium: Üllői úti stadion Attendance: 5,960; Referee: Tamás Arany

20 March 2004 19	Pécs	0–1	Ferencváros	Pécs
18:00 CET		Report	Kiss 41'	Stadium: Stadion PMFC; Attendance: 9,000; Referee: Szabolcs Saskőy

27 March 2004 20	Ferencváros	0–0	Debrecen	Budapest
18:00 CET	Kriston (red card) 4'	Report	Bernáth (red card) 19'	Stadium: Üllői úti stadion Attendance: 5,000; Referee: János Megyebíró

4 April 2004 21	Ferencváros	4–0	Győr	Budapest
11:00 CEST	Gera 36', 42', 47'; Somorjai 80'	Report		Stadium: Üllői úti stadion Attendance: 5,444; Referee: Csaba Sápi

7 April 2004 22	Szombathelyi Haladás	0–1	Ferencváros	Szombathely
18:00 CEST		Report	Czeglédi 73' (o.g.)	Stadium: Rohonci úti Stadion; Attendance: 6,000; Referee: Viktor Kassai

10 April 2004 23	Ferencváros	3–0	Sopron	Budapest
18:00 CEST	Botiș 31'; Tököli 51', 79'	Report	Huszti (red card) 35'	Stadium: Üllői úti stadion Attendance: 5,963; Referee: Zoltán Szarka

18 April 2004 24	MTK Budapest	1–0	Ferencváros	Budapest
14:00 CEST	Pisont 70'; Torghelle (yellow card) 20' (yellow-red card) 90+1'	Report	Bognár (red card) 55'; Vukmir (red card) 84'; Botiș (red card) 87'	Stadium: Hidegkuti Stadion; Attendance: 3,500; Referee: Attila Juhos

21 April 2004 25	Ferencváros	0–4	Siófok	Budapest
18:00 CEST	Kiss (yellow card) 8' (yellow-red card) 36'	Report	Usvat 26'; Sitku 57', 72'; Csordás 76' (pen.)	Stadium: Üllői úti stadion Attendance: 5,662; Referee: Attila Dubraviczky

2 May 2004 26	Ferencváros	0–1	Újpest	Budapest
11:30 CEST		Report	Tóth 71' (pen.)	Stadium: Üllői úti stadion Attendance: 7,692; Referee: Ferenc Bede

9 May 2004 27	Debrecen	3–2	Ferencváros	Debrecen
11:30 CEST	Flávio Pim 52'; Halmosi 61'; Bogdanović 66'	Report	Tököli 2', 90'; Leandro (yellow card) 16' (yellow-red card) 45'; Lipcsei (yellow card) 41' (yellow-red card) 90+2'	Stadium: Oláh Gábor utcai Stadion; Attendance: 7,000; Referee: Attila Ábrahám

12 May 2004 28	Sopron	2–2	Ferencváros	Sopron
11:30 CEST	Horváth 15'; Sira 54'	Report	Dragóner 48', 56'	Stadium: Káposztás utcai Stadion; Attendance: 5,800; Referee: János Makai

16 May 2004 29	Ferencváros	2–0	MTK Budapest	Budapest
11:30 CEST	Gera 4', 61'	Report		Stadium: Üllői úti stadion Attendance: 5,751; Referee: Zoltán Szarka

19 May 2004 30	Siófok	2–3	Ferencváros	Siófok
18:00 CEST	László 35'; Sitku 40'	Report	Lipcsei 15'; Sasu 79'; Leandro 81'; Tököli (yellow card) 77' (yellow-red card) 90+3'	Stadium: Révész Géza utcai Stadion; Attendance: 5,000; Referee: Viktor Kassai

23 May 2004 31	Újpest	1–0	Ferencváros	Budapest
11:30 CEST	Rajczi 21'	Report	Botiș (yellow card) 66' (yellow-red card) 87'	Stadium: Megyeri úti stadion Attendance: 8,526; Referee: (Croatia) Edo Trivković

27 May 2004 32	Ferencváros	3–1	Debrecen	Budapest
21:30 CEST	Gera 7'; Tököli 14'; Lipcsei 60'	Report	Sándor 33'	Stadium: Üllői úti stadion Attendance: 10,516; Referee: (Slovakia) Ľuboš Micheľ

=== Hungarian Cup ===
17 September 2003 Round of 32	Nyíregyháza	1–1 (a.e.t.) (3–4 p)	Ferencváros	Nyíregyháza
CEST	Túróczi 55'	Report	Tököli 18'; Szkukalek (red card) 86'	Stadium: Városi Stadion; Attendance: 7,000; Referee: János Megyebíró

29 October 2003 Round of 16	MTK Budapest	1–2	Ferencváros	Budapest
CET	Czvitkovics 60'; Pusztai (red card) 78'	Report	Kriston 68'; Gera 74'	Stadium: Hidegkuti Stadion; Attendance: 4,000; Referee: János Megyebíró

17 March 2004 Quarter-final	Bodajk	1–3	Ferencváros	Bodajk
CET	Pálfi 41'	Report	Gera 27', 85'; Penksa 78'	Stadium: Kastélykerti Stadion; Attendance: 2,500; Referee: Attila Ábrahám

14 April 2004 Semi-final	Vasas	1–2	Ferencváros	Budapest
CEST	Bárányos 57'	Report	Gera 36'; Tököli 41'	Stadium: Illovszky Stadion; Attendance: 8,000; Referee: Zsolt Szabó

5 May 2004 Final	Budapest Honvéd	1–3	Ferencváros	Budapest
17:30 CEST	Bábik 73'	Report	Tököli 36'; Gera 68'; Sowunmi 86'	Stadium: Ferenc Puskás Stadium; Attendance: 4,300; Referee: Attila Hanacsek

=== UEFA Cup ===
14 August 2003 First leg	Birkirkara (Malta)	0–5	(Hungary) Ferencváros	Ta'Qali National Stadium, Ta' Qali
19:45		Report	Rósa 31', 90'; Jović 55', 60'; Gera 73'	Attendance: 1,000; Referee: David McKeon (Northern Ireland)

28 August 2003 Second leg	Ferencváros (Hungary)	1–0 (6–0 agg.)	(Malta) Birkirkara	Üllői úti stadion, Budapest
20:00	Dragóner 90'	Report		Attendance: on closed Referee: Stefan Johannesson (Sweden)

24 September 2003 First leg	Ferencváros (Hungary)	1–1	(Denmark) København	Üllői úti stadion, Budapest
20:15	Kriston 37'	Report	Jónson 1'	Attendance: 6,715; Referee: Jaroslav Jara (Czech Republic)

15 October 2003 Second leg	København (Denmark)	1–1 (a.e.t.) (2–2 agg.) (3–2 p)	(Hungary) Ferencváros	Parken Stadium, Copenhagen
20:05	Nielsen 90+1' (pen.)	Report	Lipcsei 84'; Vukmir (red card) 90+2'	Attendance: 16,597; Referee: Ivan Dobrinov (Bulgaria)

=== Appearances and goals ===
Last updated on 27 May 2004.

No.	Pos	Nat	Player	Total		Nemzeti Bajnokság I		UEFA Cup		Hungarian Cup	
No.	Pos	Nat	Player	Apps	Goals	Apps	Goals	Apps	Goals	Apps	Goals
1	GK	(Hungary) HUN	Milán Udvarácz	1	0	0	-0	1	-0	0	-0
3	DF	(Hungary) HUN	Ákos Takács	1	0	1	0	0	0	0	0
4	DF	(Hungary) HUN	György Kiss	33	2	24	2	4	0	5	0
5	MF	(Slovakia) SVK	Igor Szkukalek	18	0	14	0	2	0	2	0
6	MF	(Hungary) HUN	Péter Lipcsei	38	5	30	4	3	1	5	0
8	FW	(Hungary) HUN	Árpád Nógrádi	2	0	2	0	0	0	0	0
9	FW	(Serbia and Montenegro) SCG	Aleksandar Jović	5	3	2	1	2	2	1	0
10	FW	(Brazil) BRA	Leandro	38	3	30	3	4	0	4	0
13	MF	(Hungary) HUN	Tamás Somorjai	9	1	7	1	1	0	1	0
14	MF	(Hungary) HUN	Tamás Szalai	2	0	2	0	0	0	0	0
17	FW	(Romania) ROU	Marius Sasu	33	5	27	5	4	0	2	0
20	MF	(Hungary) HUN	Dénes Rósa	33	4	25	2	4	2	4	0
21	DF	(Serbia and Montenegro) SCG	Dragan Vukmir	33	0	24	0	4	0	5	0
22	GK	(Hungary) HUN	Lajos Szűcs	40	-37	32	-30	3	-2	5	-5
23	DF	(Romania) ROU	Sorin Botiș	14	1	11	1	0	0	3	0
24	DF	(Hungary) HUN	Gábor Gyepes	9	0	7	0	0	0	2	0
26	DF	(Hungary) HUN	Attila Dragóner	33	6	25	5	4	1	4	0
27	MF	(Hungary) HUN	Attila Kriston	28	2	21	0	3	1	4	1
28	MF	(Hungary) HUN	Sándor Károlyi	3	0	3	0	0	0	0	0
30	MF	(Hungary) HUN	Zoltán Gera	38	17	30	11	3	1	5	5
51	MF	(Hungary) HUN	János Zováth	22	0	16	0	4	0	2	0
53	MF	(Slovenia) SVN	Adem Kapič	25	0	18	0	3	0	4	0
55	FW	(Hungary) HUN	Attila Tököli	26	11	21	8	1	0	4	3
78	DF	(Hungary) HUN	Zoltán Balog	9	0	6	0	1	0	2	0
79	DF	(Hungary) HUN	Zsolt Bognár	23	0	20	0	2	0	1	0
90	FW	(Hungary) HUN	Thomas Sowunmi	8	1	6	0	0	0	2	1
99	FW	(Slovakia) SVK	Marek Penksa	29	1	24	0	2	0	3	1
Youth players:
35	GK	(Hungary) HUN	Kálmán Szabó	0	0	0	-0	0	-0	0	-0
Out to loan:
11	MF	(Hungary) HUN	Szabolcs Huszti	1	0	1	0	0	0	0	0
Players no longer at the club:

=== Top scorers ===
Includes all competitive matches. The list is sorted by shirt number when total goals are equal.

Last updated on 27 May 2004

Position	Nation	Number	Name	OTP Bank Liga	UEFA Cup	Hungarian Cup	Total
1	(Hungary)	30	Zoltán Gera	11	1	5	17
2	(Hungary)	55	Attila Tököli	8	0	3	11
3	(Hungary)	26	Attila Dragóner	5	1	0	6
4	(Hungary)	6	Péter Lipcsei	4	1	0	5
5	(Romania)	17	Marius Sasu	5	0	0	5
6	(Hungary)	20	Dénes Rósa	2	2	0	4
7	(Serbia and Montenegro)	9	Aleksandar Jović	1	2	0	3
8	(Hungary)	10	Leandro	3	0	0	3
9	(Hungary)	4	György Kiss	2	0	0	2
10	(Hungary)	27	Attila Kriston	0	1	1	2
11	(Hungary)	13	Tamás Somorjai	1	0	0	1
12	(Romania)	23	Sorin Botiș	1	0	0	1
13	(Slovakia)	99	Marek Penksa	0	0	1	1
14	(Hungary)	90	Thomas Sowunmi	0	0	1	1
/	/	/	Own Goals	1	0	0	1
			TOTALS	44	8	11	63

=== Disciplinary record ===
Includes all competitive matches. Players with 1 card or more included only.

Last updated on 27 May 2004

Position	Nation	Number	Name	OTP Bank Liga		UEFA Cup		Hungarian Cup		Total (Hu Total)	
Position	Nation	Number	Name	Booked	Sent off (straight red)	Booked	Sent off (straight red)	Booked	Sent off (straight red)	Booked	Sent off (straight red)
DF	(Hungary)	3	Ákos Takács	1	0	0	0	0	0	1 (1)	0 (0)
DF	(Hungary)	4	György Kiss	2	1	0	0	2	0	4 (2)	1 (1)
MF	(Slovakia)	5	Igor Szkukalek	2	0	0	0	0	1	2 (2)	1 (0)
MF	(Hungary)	6	Péter Lipcsei	4	1	1	0	0	0	5 (4)	1 (1)
FW	(Brazil)	10	Leandro	6	1	0	0	4	0	10 (6)	1 (1)
FW	(Romania)	17	Marius Sasu	1	0	1	0	0	0	2 (1)	0 (0)
MF	(Hungary)	20	Dénes Rósa	7	0	1	0	0	0	8 (7)	0 (0)
DF	(Serbia and Montenegro)	21	Dragan Vukmir	1	2	0	1	1	0	2 (1)	3 (2)
GK	(Hungary)	22	Lajos Szűcs	0	0	0	0	1	0	1 (0)	0 (0)
DF	(Romania)	23	Sorin Botiș	2	2	0	0	2	0	4 (2)	2 (2)
DF	(Hungary)	26	Attila Dragóner	6	0	0	0	1	0	7 (6)	0 (0)
MF	(Hungary)	27	Attila Kriston	2	1	0	0	0	0	2 (2)	1 (1)
MF	(Hungary)	30	Zoltán Gera	3	0	1	0	2	0	6 (3)	0 (0)
MF	(Hungary)	51	János Zováth	1	0	1	0	1	0	3 (1)	0 (0)
MF	(Slovenia)	53	Adem Kapič	7	0	1	0	1	0	9 (7)	0 (0)
FW	(Hungary)	55	Attila Tököli	8	1	0	0	1	0	9 (8)	1 (1)
DF	(Hungary)	78	Zoltán Balog	1	0	0	0	0	0	1 (1)	0 (0)
DF	(Hungary)	79	Zsolt Bognár	3	1	2	0	0	0	5 (3)	1 (1)
FW	(Hungary)	90	Thomas Sowunmi	1	0	0	0	0	0	1 (1)	0 (0)
			TOTALS	59	10	8	1	16	1	79 (59)	12 (10)

=== Clean sheets ===
Last updated on 27 May 2004

Position	Nation	Number	Name	OTP Bank Liga	UEFA Cup	Hungarian Cup	Total
1	(Hungary)	22	Lajos Szűcs	14	1	0	15
2	(Hungary)	1	Milán Udvarácz	0	1	0	1
3	(Hungary)	35	Kálmán Szabó	0	0	0	0
			TOTALS	14	2	0	16
