= Hungary national football team results (2000–2009) =

This article provides details of international football games played by the Hungary national football team from 2000 to 2009.

== Results ==
Key
| Win |
| Draw |
| Defeat |

=== 2000 ===
| 23 February 2000 Friendly | Hungary | 0–3 | Australia | Budapest, Hungary |
| 20:15 UTC+1 | | Report | Laybutt 12'; Skoko 72'; Moore 89' | Stadium: Üllői úti Stadion; Attendance: 14,000; Referee: Dietmar Drabek (Austria) |

| 29 March 2000 Friendly | Hungary | 0–0 | Poland | Debrecen, Hungary |
| 20:15 UTC+2 | | Report | | Stadium: Oláh Gábor utcai Stadion; Attendance: 7,000; Referee: Zoran Arsić (Yugoslavia) |

| 26 April 2000 Friendly | Northern Ireland | 0–1 | Hungary | Belfast, Northern Ireland |
| 20:00 UTC+1 | | Report | Horváth 61' | Stadium: Windsor Park; Attendance: 9,140; Referee: Ceri Richards (Wales) |

| 31 May 2000 Friendly | Hungary | 2–2 | Saudi Arabia | Győr, Hungary |
| 20:30 UTC+2 | Horváth 18', 79' | Report | Al-Meshal 90+1'; Al-Jaber 90+2' | Stadium: Stadion ETO; Attendance: 5,000; Referee: Drago Kos (Slovenia) |

| 3 June 2000 Friendly | Hungary | 2–1 | Israel | Budapest, Hungary |
| 18:00 UTC+2 | Illés 47'; Horváth 52' | Report | Balili 90' | Stadium: Illovszky Rudolf Stadion; Attendance: 4,000; Referee: Željko Širić (Croatia) |

| 16 August 2000 Friendly | Hungary | 1–1 | Austria | Budapest, Hungary |
| 20:30 UTC+2 | Illés 33' | Report | Kirchler 67' | Stadium: Népstadion; Attendance: 3,500; Referee: Jaroslav Jára (Czech Republic) |

| 3 September 2000 2002 World Cup qualification | Hungary | 2–2 | Italy | Budapest, Hungary |
| 20:45 UTC+2 | Horváth 29', 78' | Report | Inzaghi 26', 35' | Stadium: Népstadion; Attendance: 60,000; Referee: Graham Barber (England) |

| 11 October 2000 2002 World Cup qualification | Lithuania | 1–6 | Hungary | Kaunas, Lithuania |
| UTC+3 | Buitkus 71' | Report | Illés 25'; M. Fehér 36', 61', 72'; Horváth 67'; Lisztes 84' | Stadium: Darius and Girėnas Stadium; Attendance: 2,000; Referee: Orhan Erdemir (Turkey) |

| 15 November 2000 Friendly | Macedonia | 0–1 (Note: The Macedonia v Hungary match was abandoned at the half time due to dense fog. The match wasn't resumed.) | Hungary | Skopje, Macedonia |
| 18:00 UTC+1 | | Report | Fehér 7' | Stadium: Gradski stadion Attendance: 2,000; Referee: Džemal Čalija (Bosnia and Herzegovina) |

=== 2001 ===
| 28 February 2001 Friendly | Bosnia and Herzegovina | 1–1 | Hungary | Zenica, Bosnia and Herzegovina |
| 17:30 UTC+1 | Barbarez 23' | Report | Horváth 13' | Stadium: Bilino Polje Stadium; Attendance: 9,000; Referee: Sašo Lazarevski (Macedonia) |

| 7 March 2001 Friendly | Jordan | 1–1 | Hungary | Amman, Jordan |
| 18:30 UTC+2 | Shelbaieh 40' | Report | Mátyus 76' | Stadium: King Abdullah Stadium; Attendance: 3,000; Referee: Hassan Marshoud (Jordan) |

| 24 March 2001 2002 World Cup qualification | Hungary | 1–1 | Lithuania | Budapest, Hungary |
| 20:00 UTC+1 | V. Sebők 70' (pen.) | Report | Ražanauskas 74' | Stadium: Népstadion; Attendance: 20,000; Referee: Vasiliy Melnichuk (Ukraine) |

| 25 April 2001 Friendly | Hungary | 0–0 | Finland | Budapest, Hungary |
| 20:30 UTC+2 | | Report | | Stadium: Üllői úti Stadion; Attendance: 5,175; Referee: Fiorenzo Treossi (Italy) |

| 2 June 2001 2002 World Cup qualification | Romania | 2–0 | Hungary | Bucharest, Romania |
| 20:30 UTC+3 | M. Niculae 5', 54' | Report | | Stadium: Stadionul Steaua; Attendance: 22,000; Referee: Éric Poulat (France) |

| 6 June 2001 2002 World Cup qualification | Hungary | 4–1 | Georgia | Budapest, Hungary |
| 20:15 UTC+2 | Mátyus 40'; V. Sebők 45' (pen.); A. Korsós 55', 62' | Report | Kobiashvili 77' | Stadium: Népstadion; Attendance: 7,325; Referee: Hartmut Strampe (Germany) |

| 15 August 2001 Friendly | Hungary | 2–5 | Germany | Budapest, Hungary |
| 20:45 UTC+2 | Tököli 64'; Horváth 90' | Report | Böhme 31' (pen.); Kehl 44'; Jancker 46'; Baumann 59'; Bierhoff 90' | Stadium: Ferenc Puskás Stadium; Attendance: 28,000; Referee: Juan Ansuategi Roca (Spain) |

| 1 September 2001 2002 World Cup qualification | Georgia | 3–1 | Hungary | Tbilisi, Georgia |
| 21:00 UTC+5 | S. Arveladze 32'; Jamarauli 53'; Iashvili 64' | Report | Mátyus 43' | Stadium: Lokomotiv Stadium; Attendance: 12,000; Referee: Drago Kos (Slovenia) |

| 5 September 2001 2002 World Cup qualification | Hungary | 0–2 | Romania | Budapest, Hungary |
| 20:15 UTC+1 | | Report | A. Ilie 11'; M. Niculae 27' | Stadium: Népstadion; Attendance: 7,000; Referee: Hugh Dallas (Scotland) |

| 6 October 2001 2002 World Cup qualification | Italy | 1–0 | Hungary | Parma, Italy |
| 20:45 UTC+2 | Del Piero 45' | Report | | Stadium: Stadio Ennio Tardini; Attendance: 20,805; Referee: Epifanio González (Paraguay) |

| 14 November 2001 Friendly | Hungary | 5–0 | Macedonia | Budapest, Hungary |
| 20:15 UTC+1 | Lisztes 4', 74'; Ferenczi 27'; Tököli 57' (pen.); Tokody 65' | Report | | Stadium: Megyeri úti Stadium; Attendance: 12,000; Referee: Yuriy Klyuchnikov (Russia) |

=== 2002 ===
| 12 February 2002 Cyprus Football Tournament 2002 Semifinal | Czech Republic | 2–0 | Hungary | Larnaca, Cyprus |
| 19:00 UTC+2 | Koloušek 7'; Koller 65' | ČMFS Report | | Stadium: GSZ Stadium; Attendance: 200; Referee: Panicos Kailis (Cyprus) |

| 13 February 2002 Cyprus Football Tournament 2002 3rd place | Switzerland | 2–1 | Hungary | Limassol, Cyprus |
| 17:00 UTC+2 | Magnin 53'; H. Yakin 56' | Report | Gyepes 82' | Stadium: Tsirio Stadium; Attendance: 100; Referee: Socratis Socratous (Cyprus) |

| 27 March 2002 Friendly | Moldova | 0–2 | Hungary | Chişinău, Moldova |
| 19:00 UTC+2 | | Report | Kenesei 14'; Tóth 51' | Stadium: Stadionul Republican; Attendance: 1,500; Referee: Vitaliy Godulyan (Ukraine) |

| 17 April 2002 Friendly | Hungary | 2–5 | Belarus | Debrecen, Hungary |
| 17:30 UTC+2 | Kenesei 13'; Fehér 86' (pen.) | Report | A. Hleb 23'; Kutuzov 29', 33'; Khatskevich 45'; Kachura 76' | Stadium: Oláh Gábor utcai Stadion; Attendance: 4,000; Referee: Mircea Salomir (Romania) |

| 8 May 2002 Friendly | Hungary | 0–2 | Croatia | Pécs, Hungary |
| 17:30 UTC+2 | | Report | Dárdai 11' (o.g.); N. Kovač 23' | Stadium: Stadion PMFC; Attendance: 8,000; Referee: Fritz Stuchlik (Austria) |

| 21 August 2002 Friendly | Hungary | 1–1 | Spain | Budapest, Hungary |
| 20:30 UTC+2 | Miriuță 72' | Report | Tamudo 54' | Stadium: Ferenc Puskás Stadium; Attendance: 20,000; Referee: Helmut Fleischer (Germany) |

| 7 September 2002 Friendly | Iceland | 0–2 | Hungary | Reykjavík, Iceland |
| 16:00 UTC+1 | | Report | Lőw 80'; Dárdai 85' | Stadium: Laugardalsvöllur; Attendance: 3,190; Referee: Jari Maisonlathi (Finland) |

| 12 October 2002 UEFA Euro 2004 qualifying | Sweden | 1–1 | Hungary | Solna, Sweden |
| 16:00 UTC+2 | Ibrahimović 76' | Report | Kenesei 5' | Stadium: Råsunda Stadium; Attendance: 35,084; Referee: Wolfgang Stark (Germany) |

| 16 October 2002 UEFA Euro 2004 qualifying | Hungary | 3–0 | San Marino | Budapest, Hungary |
| 20:30 UTC+2 | Gera 49', 60', 85' | Report | | Stadium: Szusza Ferenc Stadion; Attendance: 6,500; Referee: Gylfi Þor Orrason (Iceland) |

| 20 November 2002 Friendly | Hungary | 1–1 | Moldova | Budapest, Hungary |
| 18:00 UTC+2 | Dárdai 55' | Report | Patula 16' | Stadium: Üllői úti Stadion; Attendance: 6,000; Referee: Wolfgang Sowa (Austria) |

=== 2003 ===
| 12 February 2003 Friendly | Bulgaria | 1–0 | Hungary | Larnaca, Cyprus |
| 18:30 UTC+2 | Janković 36' | Report | | Stadium: GSZ Stadium; Attendance: 200; Referee: Kostas Theodotou (Cyprus) |
Note: The match was abandoned at 45 min. due to poor weather conditions.

| 29 March 2003 UEFA Euro 2004 qualifying | Poland | 0–0 | Hungary | Chorzów, Poland |
| 20:00 UTC+1 | | Report | | Stadium: Stadion Śląski; Attendance: 48,000; Referee: Massimo De Santis (Italy) |

| 2 April 2003 UEFA Euro 2004 qualifying | Hungary | 1–2 | Sweden | Budapest, Hungary |
| 20:15 UTC+2 | Lisztes 64' | Report | Allbäck 33', 66' | Stadium: Ferenc Puskás Stadium; Attendance: 28,000; Referee: Lucílio Batista (Portugal) |

| 30 April 2003 Friendly | Hungary | 5–1 | Luxembourg | Budapest, Hungary |
| 20:15 UTC+2 | Gera 18'; Szabics 50', 90+2'; Lisztes 61', 68' | Report | Strasser 26' | Stadium: Szusza Ferenc Stadion; Attendance: 1,205; Referee: Damir Skomina (Slovenia) |

| 7 June 2003 UEFA Euro 2004 qualifying | Hungary | 3–1 | Latvia | Budapest, Hungary |
| 20:15 UTC+2 | Szabics 51', 58'; Gera 87' | Report | Verpakovskis 38' | Stadium: Ferenc Puskás Stadium; Attendance: 4,000; Referee: Markus Merk (Germany) |

| 11 June 2003 UEFA Euro 2004 qualifying | San Marino | 0–5 | Hungary | Serravalle, San Marino |
| 20:00 UTC+2 | | Report | Böőr 4'; Lisztes 20', 81'; Kenesei 60'; Szabics 76' | Stadium: Stadio Olimpico; Attendance: 1,410; Referee: Kenny Clark (Scotland) |

| 20 August 2003 Friendly | Slovenia | 2–1 | Hungary | Murska Sobota, Slovenia |
| 17:00 UTC+2 | Šukalo 3'; Cimirotič 76' | Report | Fehér 90+3' | Stadium: Fazanerija City Stadium; Attendance: 4,000; Referee: Wolfgang Sowa (Austria) |

| 10 September 2003 UEFA Euro 2004 qualifying | Latvia | 3–1 | Hungary | Riga, Latvia |
| 21:00 UTC+3 | Verpakovskis 38', 51'; Bleidelis 43' | Report | Lisztes 53' | Stadium: Skonto Stadium; Attendance: 4,500; Referee: Claus Bo Larsen (Denmark) |

| 11 October 2003 UEFA Euro 2004 qualifying | Hungary | 1–2 | Poland | Budapest, Hungary |
| 17:00 UTC+2 | Szabics 48' | Report | Niedzielan 10', 63' | Stadium: Ferenc Puskás Stadium; Attendance: 22,000; Referee: Manuel Mejuto González (Spain) |

| 19 November 2003 Friendly | Hungary | 0–1 | Estonia | Budapest, Hungary |
| 17:00 UTC+1 | | Report | Rooba 86' | Stadium: Üllői úti stadion Attendance: 5,000; Referee: Milan Šedivý (Czech Republic) |

=== 2004 ===
| 18 February 2004 Cyprus Football Tournament 2004 Quarterfinal | Hungary | 2–0 | Armenia | Paphos, Cyprus |
| 19:00 UTC+2 | Szabics 63'; Lisztes 75' | Report | | Stadium: Pafiako Stadium; Attendance: 300; Referee: Panagiotis Gerasimou (Cyprus) |

| 19 February 2004 Cyprus Football Tournament 2004 Semifinal | Hungary | 2–1 | Latvia | Limassol, Cyprus |
| 19:00 UTC+2 | Tököli 62'; Kenesei 85' | Report | Stepanovs 64' | Stadium: Tsirion Stadium; Attendance: 162; Referee: Panikos Kailis (Cyprus) |

| 21 February 2004 Cyprus Football Tournament 2004 Final | Romania | 3–0 | Hungary | Nicosia, Cyprus |
| 15:00 UTC+2 | Mihuț 11'; Dănciulescu 89'; Caramarin 90+2' | Report | | Stadium: GSP Stadium; Attendance: 1,200; Referee: Costas Kapitanis (Cyprus) |

| 31 March 2004 Friendly | Hungary | 1–2 | Wales | Budapest, Hungary |
| 20:00 UTC+2 | Kenesei 18' (pen.) | BBC Report | Koumas 20'; Earnshaw 81' | Stadium: Ferenc Puskas Stadium; Attendance: 15,000; Referee: Florian Meyer (Germany) |

| 25 April 2004 Friendly | Hungary | 3–2 | Japan | Zalaegerszeg, Hungary |
| 13:00 UTC+2 | Kuttor 53'; Juhász 66'; Huszti 90+2' (pen.) | Report | Tamada 75'; Kubo 78' | Stadium: ZTE Arena; Attendance: 7,000; Referee: Edo Trivković (Croatia) |

| 28 April 2004 Friendly | Hungary | 1–4 | Brazil | Budapest, Hungary |
| 20:30 UTC+2 | Torghelle 56' | Report | Kaká 33'; Luís Fabiano 36', 45'; Ronaldinho 76' | Stadium: Ferenc Puskás Stadium; Attendance: 28,035; Referee: Massimo De Santis (Italy) |

| 1 June 2004 Friendly | China | 2–1 | Hungary | Tianjin, China |
| 19:30 UTC+8 | Zhou Haibin 45'; Zheng Zhi 89' (pen.) | Report | Kenesei 5' (pen.) | Stadium: TEDA Soccer Stadium; Attendance: 18,000; Referee: Chan Siu Kee (Hong Kong) |

| 6 June 2004 Friendly | Germany | 0–2 | Hungary | Kaiserslautern, Germany |
| 19:00 UTC+2 | | Report | Torghelle 6', 31' | Stadium: Fritz-Walter-Stadion; Attendance: 36,590; Referee: Steve Bennett (England) |

| 18 August 2004 Friendly | Scotland | 0–3 | Hungary | Glasgow, Scotland |
| 20:00 UTC+1 | | Report | Huszti 45+3' (pen.), 53'; Marshall 73' (o.g.) | Stadium: Hampden Park; Attendance: 15,933; Referee: Laurent Duhamel (France) |

| 4 September 2004 2006 World Cup qualification | Croatia | 3–0 | Hungary | Zagreb, Croatia |
| 20:30 UTC+2 | Pršo 31'; Klasnić 54'; Gyepes 80' (o.g.) | (Report) | | Stadium: Maksimir Stadium; Attendance: 20,853; Referee: Mike Riley (England) |

| 8 September 2004 2006 World Cup qualification | Hungary | 3–2 | Iceland | Budapest, Hungary |
| 21:15 UTC+2 | Gera 62'; Torghelle 75'; Szabics 79' | (Report) | Guðjohnsen 39'; I. Sigurðsson 78' | Stadium: Szusza Ferenc Stadium; Attendance: 5,461; Referee: Tom Henning Øvrebø (Norway) |

| 9 October 2004 2006 World Cup qualification | Sweden | 3–0 | Hungary | Solna, Sweden |
| 17:00 UTC+2 | Ljungberg 26'; Larsson 50'; Svensson 67' | (Report) | | Stadium: Råsunda Stadium; Attendance: 32,288; Referee: Stuart Dougal (Scotland) |

| 17 November 2004 2006 World Cup qualification | Malta | 0–2 | Hungary | Ta' Qali, Malta |
| 19:30 | | (Report) | Gera 39'; Kovács 93' | Stadium: Ta' Qali Stadium; Attendance: 14,500; Referee: Tony Asumaa (Finland) |

| 30 November 2004 2004 King's Cup Semifinal | Slovakia | 1–0 | Hungary | Bangkok, Thailand |
| 16:15 UTC+7 | Porázik 48' | Report | | Stadium: Supachalasai Stadium; Attendance: 750; Referee: Prayoon Veerapool (Thailand) |

| 1 December 2004 2004 King's Cup 3rd place | Hungary | 5–0 | Estonia | Bangkok, Thailand |
| 16:15 UTC+7 | Rosa 12'; Reinumäe 14' (o.g.); Kerekes 19'; Rajczi 25'; Pollák 62' | Report | | Stadium: Supachalasai Stadium; Attendance: 153; Referee: Satop Tongkhan (Thailand) |

=== 2005 ===
| 2 February 2005 Friendly | Hungary | 0–0 | Saudi Arabia | Istanbul, Turkey |
| 16:00 UTC+2 | | Report | | Stadium: Atatürk Olympic Stadium; Attendance: 100; Referee: Selçuk Dereli (Turkey) |

| 9 February 2005 Friendly | Wales | 2–0 | Hungary | Cardiff, Wales |
| 20:00 UTC+0 | Bellamy 68', 80' | Report | | Stadium: Millennium Stadium; Attendance: 16,672; Referee: Charlie Richmond (Scotland) |

| 30 March 2005 2006 World Cup qualification | Hungary | 1–1 | Bulgaria | Budapest, Hungary |
| 20:45 UTC+2 | Rajczi 90' | (Report) | S. Petrov 51' | Stadium: Szusza Ferenc Stadion; Attendance: 11,586; Referee: Jan Wegereef (Netherlands) |

| 31 May 2005 Friendly | France | 2–1 | Hungary | Metz, France |
| 21:00 UTC+2 | Cissé 10'; Malouda 35' | Report | Kerekes 78' | Stadium: Stade Saint-Symphorien; Attendance: 26,186; Referee: Paul Allaerts (Belgium) |

| 4 June 2005 2006 World Cup qualification | Iceland | 2–3 | Hungary | Reykjavík, Iceland |
| 18:05 UTC+1 | Guðjohnsen 17'; K. Sigurðsson 68' | (Report) | Gera 45', 56'; Huszti 73' | Stadium: Laugardalsvöllur; Attendance: 4,613; Referee: Lucílio Batista (Portugal) |

| 17 August 2005 Friendly | Hungary | 1–2 | Argentina | Budapest, Hungary |
| 17:30 UTC+2 | Torghelle 29' | Report | M. Rodríguez 19'; Heinze 62' | Stadium: Stadium Puskás Ferenc; Attendance: 20,000; Referee: Markus Merk (Germany) |

| 3 September 2005 2006 World Cup qualification | Hungary | 4–0 | Malta | Budapest, Hungary |
| 20:45 UTC+2 | Torghelle 34'; Said 55' (o.g.); Takács 64'; Rajczi 85' | (Report) | | Stadium: Stadium Puskás Ferenc; Attendance: 5,900; Referee: Vitaliy Godulyan (Ukraine) |

| 7 September 2005 2006 World Cup qualification | Hungary | 0–1 | Sweden | Budapest, Hungary |
| 20:45 UTC+2 | | (Report) | Ibrahimović 90+1' | Stadium: Stadium Puskás Ferenc; Attendance: 20,161; Referee: Stefano Farina (Italy) |

| 8 October 2005 2006 World Cup qualification | Bulgaria | 2–0 | Hungary | Sofia, Bulgaria |
| 18:00 UTC+3 | Berbatov 29'; Lazarov 55' | (Report) | | Stadium: Vasil Levski National Stadium; Attendance: 4,652; Referee: Dejan Delević (Serbia and Montenegro) |

| 12 October 2005 2006 World Cup qualification | Hungary | 0–0 | Croatia | Budapest, Hungary |
| 19:30 UTC+2 | | (Report) | | Stadium: Szusza Ferenc Stadium; Attendance: 6,979; Referee: Claus Bo Larsen (Denmark) |

| 16 November 2005 Friendly | Greece | 2–1 | Hungary | Piraeus, Greece |
| 21:15 UTC+2 | Giannakopoulos 31'; Kafes 90+1' | Report | Kenesei 77' | Stadium: Karaiskakis Stadium; Attendance: 12,500; Referee: Pieter Vink (Netherlands) |

| 14 December 2005 Friendly | Mexico | 2–0 | Hungary | Phoenix, United States |
| 20:00 UTC-7 | Fonseca 33'; Huiqui 52' | Report | | Stadium: Chase Field; Attendance: 32,466; Referee: Ricardo Valenzuela (United States) |

| 18 December 2005 Friendly | Hungary | 3–0 | Antigua and Barbuda | Miami, United States |
| 15:00 UTC-5 | Vadócz 10'; Feczesin 32'; Ferenczi 80' | Report | | Stadium: FIU Soccer Stadium; Attendance: 150; Referee: Reggie Rutty (United States) |

=== 2006 ===
| 24 May 2006 Friendly | Hungary | 2–0 | New Zealand | Budapest, Hungary |
| 19:00 UTC+2 | Huszti 48'; Szabics 80' | Report | | Stadium: Szusza Ferenc Stadium; Attendance: 6,500; Referee: Vladimír Hriňák (Slovakia) |

| 30 May 2006 Friendly | England | 3–1 | Hungary | Manchester, England |
| 20:05 UTC+1 | Gerrard 45'; Terry 51'; Crouch 84' | Report | Dárdai 55' | Stadium: Old Trafford; Attendance: 56,323; Referee: Pieter Vink (Netherlands) |

| 16 August 2006 Friendly | Austria | 1–2 | Hungary | Graz, Austria |
| 20:05 UTC+1 | Kuljić 74' | Report | Gera 11'; Horváth 37' | Stadium: UPC-Arena; Attendance: 12,000; Referee: Richard Havrilla (Slovakia) |

| 2 September 2006 UEFA Euro 2008 qualifying | Hungary | 1–4 | Norway | Budapest, Hungary |
| 19:00 UTC+2 | Gera 90' (pen.) | Report | Solskjær 15', 44'; Strømstad 31'; Pedersen 41' | Stadium: Szusza Ferenc Stadium; Attendance: 10,500; Referee: Pieter Vink (Netherlands) |

| 6 September 2006 UEFA Euro 2008 qualifying | Bosnia and Herzegovina | 1–3 | Hungary | Zenica, Bosnia and Herzegovina |
| 20:15 UTC+2 | Misimović 64' (pen.) | Report | Huszti 36' (pen.); Gera 46'; Dárdai 49' | Stadium: Bilino Polje; Attendance: 18,000; Referee: Costas Kapitanis (Cyprus) |

| 7 October 2006 UEFA Euro 2008 qualifying | Hungary | 0–1 | Turkey | Budapest, Hungary |
| 19:00 UTC+2 | | Report | Tuncay 41' | Stadium: Stadium Puskás Ferenc; Attendance: 9,500; Referee: Alain Hamer (Luxembourg) |

| 11 October 2006 UEFA Euro 2008 qualifying | Malta | 2–1 | Hungary | Ta' Qali, Malta |
| 19:15 UTC+2 | Schembri 14', 53' | Report | Torghelle 19' | Stadium: Ta' Qali Stadium; Attendance: 3,500; Referee: Johny Ver Eecke (Belgium) |

| 15 November 2006 Friendly | Hungary | 1–0 | Canada | Székesfehérvár, Hungary |
| 20:00 UTC+1 | Priskin 36' | Report | | Stadium: Sóstói Stadion; Attendance: 6,000; Referee: Michael Weiner (Germany) |

=== 2007 ===
| 6 February 2007 Cyprus Football Tournament 2007 Semifinal | Cyprus | 2–1 | Hungary | Limassol, Cyprus |
| 19:00 UTC+2 | Yiasoumi 10'; Okkas 73' | Report | Priskin 89' | Stadium: Tsirion Stadium; Attendance: 200; Referee: Panagiotis Gerasimou (Cyprus) |

| 7 February 2007 Cyprus Football Tournament 2007 3rd place | Hungary | 2–0 | Latvia | Limassol, Cyprus |
| 17:00 UTC+2 | Priskin 32', 52' | Report | | Stadium: Tsirion Stadium; Attendance: 120; Referee: Panikos Kailis (Cyprus) |

| 24 March 2007 Friendly | Montenegro | 2–1 | Hungary | Podgorica, Montenegro |
| 18:00 UTC+1 | Vučinić 63' (pen.); Burzanović 83' (pen.) | Report | Priskin 1' | Stadium: Podgorica City Stadium; Attendance: 12,000; Referee: Robert Krajnc (Slovenia) |

| 28 March 2007 UEFA Euro 2008 qualifying | Hungary | 2–0 | Moldova | Budapest, Hungary |
| 18:00 UTC+2 | Priskin 9'; Gera 63' | Report | | Stadium: Szusza Ferenc Stadium; Attendance: 6,200; Referee: Martin Ingvarsson (Sweden) |

| 2 June 2007 UEFA Euro 2008 qualifying | Greece | 2–0 | Hungary | Heraklion, Greece (Note: Greece forced to play away from Athens for two matches after crowd disturbances in the game against Turkey on 24 March 2007.) |
| 21:30 UTC+3 | Gekas 16'; Seitaridis 29' | Report | | Stadium: Pankritio Stadium; Attendance: 16,000; Referee: Claus Bo Larsen (Denmark) |

| 6 June 2007 UEFA Euro 2008 qualifying | Norway | 4–0 | Hungary | Oslo, Norway |
| 19:00 UTC+2 | Iversen 22'; Braaten 57'; Carew 60', 78' | Report | | Stadium: Ullevaal Stadion; Attendance: 19,198; Referee: Eduardo Iturralde González (Spain) |

| 22 August 2007 Friendly | Hungary | 3–1 | Italy | Budapest, Hungary |
| 20:45 UTC+2 | Juhász 61'; Gera 66' (pen.); Feczesin 77' | Report | Di Natale 48' | Stadium: Ferenc Puskás Stadium; Attendance: 34,906; Referee: Manuel Mejuto González (Spain) |

| 8 September 2007 UEFA Euro 2008 qualifying | Hungary | 1–0 | Bosnia and Herzegovina | Székesfehérvár, Hungary |
| 16:00 UTC+2 | Gera 39' (pen.) | Report | | Stadium: Stadion Sóstói; Attendance: 10,877; Referee: Matteo Trefoloni (Italy) |

| 12 September 2007 UEFA Euro 2008 qualifying | Turkey | 3–0 | Hungary | Istanbul, Turkey |
| 20:30 UTC+3 | Gökhan 68'; Aurélio 72'; Halil Altıntop 90+3' | Report | | Stadium: BJK İnönü Stadium; Attendance: 28,020; Referee: Stuart Dougal (Scotland) |

| 13 October 2007 UEFA Euro 2008 qualifying | Hungary | 2–0 | Malta | Budapest, Hungary |
| 16:20 UTC+2 | Feczesin 34'; Tőzsér 77' | Report | | Stadium: Szusza Ferenc Stadium; Attendance: 6,000; Referee: Karen Nalbandyan (Armenia) |

| 17 October 2007 Friendly | Poland | 0–1 | Hungary | Łódź, Poland |
| 18:00 UTC+2 | | Report | Hajnal 80' (pen.) | Stadium: Stadion Widzewa; Attendance: 6,500; Referee: Claudio Circhetta (Switzerland) |

| 17 November 2007 UEFA Euro 2008 qualifying | Moldova | 3–0 | Hungary | Chișinău, Moldova |
| 19:00 UTC+2 | Bugaev 13'; Josan 23'; Alexeev 86' | Report | | Stadium: Zimbru Stadium; Attendance: 6,483; Referee: Pavel Královec (Czech Republic) |

| 21 November 2007 UEFA Euro 2008 qualifying | Hungary | 1–2 | Greece | Budapest, Hungary |
| 20:15 UTC+1 | Buzsáky 7' | Report | Vanczák 22' (o.g.); Basinas 59' (pen.) | Stadium: Puskás Ferenc Stadium; Attendance: 32,300; Referee: Rob Styles (England) |

=== 2008 ===
| 6 February 2008 Friendly | Slovakia | 1–1 | Hungary | Limassol, Cyprus |
| 19:00 UTC+2 | Šesták 64' | Report | Gera 54' | Stadium: Tsirion Stadium; Attendance: 100; Referee: Leontios Trattou (Cyprus) |

| 26 March 2008 Friendly | Hungary | 0–1 | Slovenia | Zalaegerszeg, Hungary |
| 18:00 UTC+2 | | Report | Šišić 59' | Stadium: ZTE Arena; Attendance: 6,000; Referee: Stefan Meßner (Austria) |

| 24 May 2008 Friendly | Hungary | 3–2 | Greece | Budapest, Hungary |
| 19:00 UTC+2 | Dzsudzsák 46'; Juhász 59'; Vadócz 63' | Report | Amanatidis 45'; Lyberopoulos 90+1' | Stadium: Puskás Ferenc Stadium; Attendance: 6,500; Referee: Kevin Blom (Netherlands) |

| 31 May 2008 Friendly | Hungary | 1–1 | Croatia | Budapest, Hungary |
| 20:30 UTC+2 | Vaskó 44' | Report | N. Kovač 24' | Stadium: Szusza Ferenc Stadion; Attendance: 6,979; Referee: Damien Ledentu (France) |

| 20 August 2008 Friendly | Hungary | 3–3 | Montenegro | Budapest, Hungary |
| 18:00 UTC+2 | Priskin 29'; Hajnal 55', 88' (pen.) | Report | Jovetić 45', 68'; Vukčević 51' | Stadium: Ferenc Puskás Stadium; Attendance: 4,913; Referee: Richard Havrilla (Slovakia) |

| 6 September 2008 2010 World Cup qualification | Hungary | 0–0 | Denmark | Budapest, Hungary |
| 19:45 UTC+2 | | Report | | Stadium: Ferenc Puskás Stadium; Attendance: 18,984; Referee: Alain Hamer (Luxembourg) |

| 10 September 2008 2010 World Cup qualification | Sweden | 2–1 | Hungary | Solna, Sweden |
| 20:15 UTC+2 | Källström 55'; Holmén 64' | Report | Rudolf 90+3' | Stadium: Råsunda Stadium; Attendance: 28,177; Referee: Florian Meyer (Germany) |

| 11 October 2008 2010 World Cup qualification | Hungary | 2–0 | Albania | Budapest, Hungary |
| 19:45 UTC+2 | Torghelle 49'; Juhász 82' | Report | | Stadium: Ferenc Puskás Stadium; Attendance: 18,000; Referee: Claudio Circhetta (Switzerland) |

| 15 October 2008 2010 World Cup qualification | Malta | 0–1 | Hungary | Ta' Qali, Malta |
| 19:30 UTC+2 | | Report | Torghelle 23' | Stadium: Ta' Qali Stadium; Attendance: 4,797; Referee: Johannes Valgeirsson (Iceland) |

| 19 November 2008 Friendly | Northern Ireland | 0–2 | Hungary | Belfast, Northern Ireland |
| 19:45 UTC+0 | | Report | Torghelle 57'; Gera 71' | Stadium: Windsor Park; Attendance: 9,908; Referee: Robert Schörgenhofer (Austria) |

=== 2009 ===
| 11 February 2009 Friendly | Israel | 1–0 | Hungary | Ramat Gan, Israel |
| 19:00 UTC+2 | Benayoun 77' | Report | | Stadium: Ramat Gan Stadium; Attendance: 9,211; Referee: Marcin Borski (Poland) |

| 28 March 2009 2010 World Cup qualification | Albania | 0–1 | Hungary | Tirana, Albania |
| 20:30 UTC+1 | | Report | Torghelle 38' | Stadium: Qemal Stafa; Attendance: 12,000; Referee: Björn Kuipers (Netherlands) |

| 1 April 2009 2010 World Cup qualification | Hungary | 3–0 | Malta | Budapest, Hungary |
| 19:00 UTC+2 | Hajnal 7'; Gera 81'; Juhász 90+3' | Report | | Stadium: Ferenc Puskás Stadium; Attendance: 34,400; Referee: Stanislav Sukhina (Russia) |

| 12 August 2009 Friendly | Hungary | 0–1 | Romania | Budapest, Hungary |
| 20:00 UTC+2 | | Report | Ghioane 42' | Stadium: Puskás Ferenc Stadium; Attendance: 9,000; Referee: Vladimir Vnuk (Slovakia) |

| 5 September 2009 2010 World Cup qualification | Hungary | 1–2 | Sweden | Budapest, Hungary |
| 20:00 UTC+2 | Huszti 79' (pen.) | Report | Mellberg 9'; Ibrahimović 90+3' | Stadium: Ferenc Puskás Stadium; Attendance: 40,169; Referee: Nicola Rizzoli (Italy) |

| 9 September 2009 2010 World Cup qualification | Hungary | 0–1 | Portugal | Budapest, Hungary |
| 20:45 UTC+2 | | Report | Pepe 10' | Stadium: Ferenc Puskás Stadium; Attendance: 42,000; Referee: Stéphane Lannoy (France) |

| 10 October 2009 2010 World Cup qualification | Portugal | 3–0 | Hungary | Lisbon, Portugal |
| 20:45 UTC+1 | Simão 18', 79'; Liédson 74' | Report | | Stadium: Estádio da Luz; Attendance: 50,115; Referee: Alain Hamer (Luxembourg) |

| 14 October 2009 2010 World Cup qualification | Denmark | 0–1 | Hungary | Copenhagen, Denmark |
| 20:45 UTC+2 | | Report | Buzsáky 35' | Stadium: Parken Stadium; Attendance: 36,966; Referee: Florian Meyer (Germany) |

| 14 November 2009 Friendly | Belgium | 3–0 | Hungary | Ghent, Belgium |
| 20:45 UTC+1 | Fellaini 38'; Vermaelen 56'; Mirallas 61' (pen.) | Report | | Stadium: Jules Ottenstadion; Attendance: 8,000; Referee: Hervé Piccirillo (France) |
