= 2007–08 in Greek football =

The 2007–08 season was the ?? season of competitive football in Greece.

== Coaches ==
Team	Name
AEK Athens	(Greece) Nikos Kostenoglou
Apollon Kalamarias	(Greece) Makis Katsavakis
Aris	(Bosnia and Herzegovina) Dušan Bajević
Asteras Tripolis	(Greece) Panagiotis Tzanavaras
Atromitos	(Brazil) Paulo Cambos
Ergotelis	(Greece) Nikos Karageorgiou
Iraklis	(Spain) Miguel Angel Lamilla
AEL	(Greece) Georgios Donis
Levadiakos	(Greece) Babis Tennes
OFI	(Greece) Georgios Paraschos
Olympiacos	(Spain) José Segura
Panathinaikos	(Portugal) José Peseiro
Panionios	(Germany) Ewald Lienen
PAOK	(Portugal) Fernando Santos
Veria	(Greece) Leonidas Yfantidis
Skoda Xanthi	(Greece) Nikos Kechagias

Below is the list of coaches who left their teams after the start of the season.

Team	Name
Aris	(Spain) Juan Carlos Oliva
PAOK	(Greece) Giorgos Paraschos
Skoda Xanthi	(Belgium) Emilio Ferrera
Veria	(Greece) Dimitris Kalaitzidis
OFI	(Germany) Reiner Maurer
Veria	(Serbia) Ratko Dostanic
Iraklis	(Serbia) Ivan Jovanović
AEK Athens	(Spain) Lorenzo Serra Ferrer
Asteras Tripolis	(Brazil) Paulo Campos
Levadiakos	(Bulgaria) Georgi Vasilev
Olympiacos	(Greece) Takis Lemonis
Veria	(Greece) Giannis Mantzourakis
Veria	(Greece) Giotis Tsalouchidis
Atromitos	(Argentina) Ángel Guillermo Hoyos

== European Competition ==
=== UEFA Champions League ===
==== Third qualifying round ====
- AEK

Date	Team	Score	Team	Stadium	Report
15 August 2007	(Spain) Sevilla	2–0	(Greece) AEK Athens	Estadio Ramón Sánchez Pizjuán	Report
3 September 2007	(Greece) AEK Athens	1–4	(Spain) Sevilla	Athens Olympic Stadium	Report

(Sevilla FC advances 6 – 1 on aggregate)

==== Group stage ====
- Olympiacos

Date	Team	Score	Team	Stadium	Report
18 September 2007	(Greece) Olympiacos	1–1	(Italy) Lazio	Georgios Karaiskakis	Report
3 October 2007	(Germany) Werder Bremen	1–3	(Greece) Olympiacos	Weserstadion	Report
24 October 2007	(Spain) Real Madrid	4–2	(Greece) Olympiacos	Santiago Bernabéu	Report
6 November 2007	(Greece) Olympiacos	0–0	(Spain) Real Madrid	Georgios Karaiskakis	Report
28 November 2007	(Italy) Lazio	1–2	(Greece) Olympiacos	Stadio Olimpico	Report
11 December 2007	(Greece) Olympiacos	3–0	(Germany) Werder Bremen	Georgios Karaiskakis	Report

(Olympiacos advances by finishing second in the group with 11 points)

==== Last 16 ====
- Olympiacos

Date	Team	Score	Team	Stadium	Report
19 February 2008	(Greece) Olympiacos	0–0	(England) Chelsea	Karaiskakis Stadium	Report
5 March 2008	(England) Chelsea	3–0	(Greece) Olympiacos	Stamford Bridge	Report

(Chelsea FC advances 3 – 0 on aggregate)

=== UEFA Cup ===
==== First round ====
- AEK Athrns

Date	Team	Score	Team	Stadium	Report
20 September 2007	(Greece) AEK Athens	3–0	(Austria) Red Bull Salzburg	Athens Olympic Stadium	Report
4 October 2007	(Austria) Red Bull Salzburg	1–0	(Greece) AEK Athens	Wals Siezenheim Stadium	Report

(AEK advances 3 – 1 on aggregate)

- Panathinaikos

Date	Team	Score	Team	Stadium	Report
20 September 2007	(Slovakia) Artmedia	1–2	(Greece) Panathinaikos	Tehelné pole	Report
2 October 2007	(Greece) Panathinaikos	3–0	(Slovakia) Artmedia	Leoforos Alexandras Stadium	Report

(Panathinaikos advances 5–1 on aggregate)

- Aris

Date	Team	Score	Team	Stadium	Report
20 September 2007	(Greece) Aris	1–0	(Spain) Real Zaragoza	Kleanthis Vikelidis Stadium	Report
4 October 2007	(Spain) Real Zaragoza	2–1	(Greece) Aris	La Romareda	Report

(Aris advances 2 – 2 on the away goals rule)

- AEL

Date	Team	Score	Team	Stadium	Report
20 September 2007	(Greece) AEL	2–0	(England) Blackburn Rovers	Panthessaliko Stadium	Report
4 October 2007	(England) Blackburn Rovers	2–1	(Greece) AEL	Ewood Park	Report

(AEL advances 3 – 2 on aggregate)

- Panionios

Date	Team	Score	Team	Stadium	Report
20 September 2007	(France) Sochaux	0–2	(Greece) Panionios	Stade Auguste Bonal	Report
4 October 2007	(Greece) Panionios	0–1	(France) Sochaux	Nea Smyrni Stadium	Report

(Panionios advances 2–1 on aggregate)

==== Group stage ====
- AEK Athens

Date	Team	Score	Team	Stadium	Report
25 October 2007	(Sweden) Elfsborg	1–1	(Greece) AEK Athens	Borås Arena	Report
29 November 2007	(Greece) AEK Athens	1–1	(Italy) Fiorentina	Athens Olympic Stadium	Report
5 December 2007	(Czech Republic) Mladá Boleslav	0–1	(Greece) AEK Athens	Městský Stadion	Report
20 December 2007	(Greece) AEK Athens	1–2	(Spain) Villarreal	Athens Olympic Stadium	Report

(AEK Athens advances by finishing third in the group with 5 points)

- Panathinaikos

Date	Team	Score	Team	Stadium	Report
25 October 2007	(Greece) Panathinaikos	3–0	(Scotland) Aberdeen	Leoforos Alexandras Stadium	Report
8 November 2007	(Denmark) København	0–1	(Greece) Panathinaikos	Parken	Report
5 December 2007	(Greece) Panathinaikos	2–0	(Russia) Lokomotiv Moscow	Leoforos Alexandras Stadium	Report
20 December 2007	(Spain) Atlético	2–1	(Greece) Panathinaikos	Vicente Calderón	Report

(Panathinaikos advances by finishing second in the group with 9 points)

- Aris

Date	Team	Score	Team	Stadium	Report
8 November 2007	(Greece) Aris	3–0	(Serbia) Crvena Zvezda	Kleanthis Vikelidis	Report
29 November 2007	(England) Bolton Wanderers	1–1	(Greece) Aris	Reebok Stadium	Report
6 December 2007	(Greece) Aris	1–1	(Portugal) Sporting Braga	Kleanthis Vikelidis	Report
19 December 2007	(Germany) Bayern München	6–0	(Greece) Aris	Allianz Arena	Report

(Aris fail to advance by finishing fourth in the group with 5 points)

- AEL

Date	Team	Score	Team	Stadium	Report
25 October 2007	(England) Everton	3–1	(Greece) AEL	Goodison Park	Report
8 November 2007	(Greece) AEL	2–3	(Russia) Zenit St. Petersburg	Panthessaliko	Report
29 November 2007	(Netherlands) AZ	1–0	(Greece) AEL	DSB	Report
20 December 2007	(Greece) AEL	1–3	(Germany) Nürnberg	Panthessaliko	Report

(Larissa fail to advance by finishing fifth in the group with 0 points)

- Panionios

Date	Team	Score	Team	Stadium	Report
25 October 2007	(Sweden) Helsingborg	1–1	(Greece) Panionios	Olympia	Report
29 November 2007	(Greece) Panionios	0–3	(Turkey) Galatasaray	Nea Smyrni Stadium	Report
6 December 2007	Austria Wien	0–1	(Greece) Panionios	Franz Horr Stadium	Report
19 December 2007	(Greece) Panionios	2–3	(France) Bordeaux	Nea Smyrni Stadium	Report

(Panionios fail to advance by finishing fourth in the group with 4 points)

==== Round of 32 ====
- AEK Athens

Date	Team	Score	Team	Stadium	Report
13 February 2008	(Greece) AEK Athens	1–1	(Spain) Getafe CF	Athens Olympic Stadium	Report
21 February 2008	(Spain) Getafe CF	3–0	(Greece) AEK Athens	Coliseum Alfonso Pérez	Report

(Getafe advances 4 – 1 on aggregate)

- Panathinaikos

Date	Team	Score	Team	Stadium	Report
13 February 2008	(Scotland) Rangers F.C.	0 -0	(Greece) Panathinaikos	Ibrox Stadium	Report
21 February 2008	(Greece) Panathinaikos	1–1	(Scotland) Rangers F.C.	Leoforos Alexandras Stadium	Report

(Rangers advances 1 – 1 on the away goals rule)

=== Intertoto Cup ===
- OFI
  - Third Round

Date	Team	Score	Team	Stadium	Report
22 July 2007	(Kazakhstan) Tobol Kostanay	1–0	(Greece) OFI	Central Stadium	Report
29 July 2007	(Greece) OFI	0–1	(Kazakhstan) Tobol Kostanay	Pankritiko Stadium	Report

(Tobol Kostanay advances 2–0 on aggregate)

== National team ==
Date	Venue	Team	Score	Team	Competition	Match report
March 28, 2007	Ta' Qali Stadium	Malta	0–1	Greece	Euro2008Q	Report
June 2, 2007	Pankritio Stadium	Greece	2–0	Hungary	Euro2008Q	Report
June 6, 2007	Pankritio Stadium	Greece	2–1	Moldova	Euro2008Q	Report
September 12, 2007	Ullevaal Stadion	Norway	2–2	Greece	Euro2008Q	Report
October 13, 2007	Athens Olympic Stadium	Greece	3–2	Bosnia and Herzegovina	Euro2008Q	Report
October 17, 2007	Ali Sami Yen Stadium	Turkey	0–1	Greece	Euro2008Q	Report
November 17, 2007	Athens Olympic Stadium	Greece	5–0	Malta	Euro2008Q	Report
November 21, 2007	Athens Olympic Stadium	Hungary	1–2	Greece	Euro2008Q	Report
March 26, 2008	LTU Arena	Portugal	1–2	Greece	Friendly	Report

== Honours ==
=== Club Honours ===
Competition	Winner	Details
Super League Greece	Olympiacos	Super League Greece 2007-08
Second Division	Panserraikos	Second Division 2007–08
Greek Cup	Olympiacos	Greek Cup 2007-08
Greek Super Cup	Olympiacos	Greek Super Cup 2007–08

=== Player Honours ===
Player of the Year

Nationality	Player
—	—

Young Player of the Year

Nationality	Player
—	—

Top scorer

Nationality	Player	Goals
Argentina	Ismael Blanco	19

Team of the Year

Position	Nat.	Player	Club
GK	—	—	—
DF	—	—	—
DF	—	—	—
DF	—	—	—
DF	—	—	—
MF	—	—	—
MF	—	—	—
MF	—	—	—
MF	—	—	—
ST	—	—	—
ST	—	—	—

== Retirements ==
- Zisis Vryzas
- Akis Zikos
