= Grujić =

Grujić (Serbian Cyrillic: Грујић) is a Serbian surname, a patronymic derived from Gruja, itself a diminutive of names Grubаn and Grubаš. People with this surname include:

- Duško Grujić (born 1972), Serbian footballer
- Katarina Grujić (born 1992), Serbian singer
- Marko Grujić (born 1996), Serbian footballer
- Nebojša Grujić (born 1991), Serbian sprint canoer
- Nikanor Grujić (1810–1887), Serbian bishop
- Sava Grujić (1840–1913), Serbian statesman
- Slobodan Grujić (born 1973), Serbian table tennis player
- Spira Grujić (born 1971), Serbian footballer
- Vladan Grujić (born 1981), Bosnia-Herzegovina footballer
