= Yeghia Yavruyan =

Armenian footballer (born 1981)

Personal information
- Full name: Yeghia Khachikovich Yavruyan
- Date of birth: 18 October 1981 (age 45)
- Place of birth: Rostov Oblast, RSFSR, Soviet Union
- Height: 1.77 m (5 ft 10 in)
- Position: Forward

Youth career
- –1998: Rostov-on-Don
- 1998–2000: Dunaferr

Senior career*
Years	Team	Apps	(Gls)
1998–2000	Dunaferr	5	(0)
2000	→ Eger (loan)	13	(5)
2000–2002	Rákospalota	38	(1)
2002–2003	Sopron	38	(9)
2003–2004	Békéscsaba	32	(6)
2004–2005	Hapoel Petah Tikva	27	(7)
2005–2006	Hapoel Tel Aviv	20	(8)
2006	Shinnik Yaroslavl	6	(0)
2006–2007	Ironi Kiryat Shmona	22	(10)
2007–2008	Bnei Sakhnin	31	(10)
2008–2010	Maccabi Tel Aviv	51	(12)
2010–2011	Bnei Yehuda	16	(2)
2011	Hapoel Ashkelon	17	(2)
2012–2013	FC Dongazdobycha Sulin		

International career
2001	Russia U21	1	(0)
2009–2010	Armenia	4	(0)
- * Club domestic league appearances and goals

Yeghia Yavruyan (Armenian: Եղիա Յավրույան, Russian: Егия Явруян; born on 18 October 1981) is an Armenian former professional footballer who played as a forward, spending most of his career in the Israeli Premier League, in Hungary and in Russia. Having made one appearance for the Russia U21 national team, he made his debut for Armenia against Moldova on 12 August 2009.

== Career statistics ==
Appearances and goals by club, season and competition
Club	Season	League			National cup (Note: Includes Magyar Kupa)		League cup		Europe		Other		Total	
Club	Season	Division	Apps	Goals	Apps	Goals	Apps	Goals	Apps	Goals	Apps	Goals	Apps	Goals
Dunaferr	1998–99	Nemzeti Bajnokság I	5	0	—		—		—		—		5	0
Eger (loan)	1999–2000	Nemzeti Bajnokság III	13	5	—		—		—		—		13	5
Rákospalota	2000–01	Nemzeti Bajnokság II	26	0	—		—		—		—		26	0
Rákospalota	2001–02	Nemzeti Bajnokság II	12	1	4	4	—		—		—		16	5
Rákospalota	Total		38	1	4	4	—		—		—		42	5
Sopron	2001–02	Nemzeti Bajnokság I	14	2	1	0	—		—		—		15	2
Sopron	2002–03	Nemzeti Bajnokság I	24	7	3	0	—		—		—		27	7
Sopron	Total		38	9	4	0	—		—		—		42	9
Békéscsaba	2003–04	Nemzeti Bajnokság I	32	6	—		—		—		2 (Note: Appearances in Nemzeti Bajnokság I relegation play-offs)	0	34	6
Career total			126	21	8	4					2	0	136	25

== Honours ==
Hapoel Petah Tikva

- Toto Cup Al: 2004–05

Maccabi Tel Aviv

- Israel State Cup: 2005–06
- Toto Cup Al: 2008–09
