= Marius Sasu =

Romanian footballer

Personal information
- Date of birth: 1 October 1975 (age 51)
- Place of birth: Mediaş, Romania
- Height: 1.80 m (5 ft 11 in)
- Position: Forward

Senior career*
Years	Team	Apps	(Gls)
1995–1996	UM Timișoara	10	(3)
1996–2000	Politehnica Timişoara	86	(31)
1997–1998	→ Vojvodina (loan)	0	(0)
1999–2000	→ CSM Reșița (loan)	11	(2)
2000–2001	Rapid București	9	(1)
2001–2003	Budapest Honvéd	71	(30)
2003–2006	Ferencváros	34	(5)
2005–2006	→ Panserraikos (loan)	–	(–)
- * Club domestic league appearances and goals

Marius Sasu (born 1 October 1975) is a retired Romanian professional footballer.

== Career ==
Playing as striker, he spent most of his early career with FC Politehnica Timișoara in Liga I. In 1997–98 he had a spell with FK Vojvodina in FR Yugoslavia. In 2001, after a short spell with FC Rapid București, he moved to Hungary where he will play until 2005 with Budapest Honvéd and Ferencváros. In 2005–06 he played one season with Panserraikos in Greek second league.

== Honours ==
Ferencváros

- Nemzeti Bajnokság I: 2003–04
- Magyar Kupa: 2003–04
