= Ivan Ristić =

Serbian footballer (born 1975)

Personal information
- Date of birth: 10 January 1975 (age 51)
- Place of birth: SFR Yugoslavia
- Height: 1.83 m (6 ft 0 in)
- Position: Defender

Senior career*
Years	Team	Apps	(Gls)
- Jedinstvo Paraćin
1997–2001	Vojvodina	30+	(1+)
2001–2002	Rad	17	(0)
2002–2004	Videoton	17+	(0+)
2005–2011	Syrianska	82+	(0+)

Managerial career
- 2012–2013: Syrianska (assistant)
- 2014–2016: AFC United (assistant)
- 2016–2018: Djurgårdens (assistant)
- * Club domestic league appearances and goals

Ivan Ristić (Serbian Cyrillic: Иван Ристић; born 10 January 1975) is a Serbian football manager and former player.

== Playing career ==
Born in Serbia he was playing with FK Jedinstvo Paraćin when he signed with FK Vojvodina in 1997 where he played in the First League of FR Yugoslavia until 2001. He had a spell with FK Rad in 2001-2002 before moving to Hungary to play with Videoton FC. In 2005, he moved to Sweden to play with Syrianska FC in Allsvenskan.

== Managerial career ==
After retiring, he became the coach of Syrianska FC (2012-2013), AFC United (2014-2016), Djurgårdens IF (2016-2018 ).
