= Richárd Hoffmann =

Hungarian footballer

Personal information
- Full name: Richárd Péter Hoffmann
- Date of birth: 17 November 1978 (age 47)
- Place of birth: Budapest, Hungary
- Height: 1.79 m (5 ft 10 in)
- Position: Striker

Youth career
- Budapest Honvéd FC

Senior career*
Years	Team	Apps	(Gls)
1997–2000	Budapest Honvéd FC	4	(0)
2000–2001	BVSC Budapest	?	(0)
2001–	Békéscsabai Előre FC	26	(3)
- * Club domestic league appearances and goals as of 31 May 2003

Richárd Péter Hoffmann (born 17 November 1978) is a Hungarian footballer who plays for Békéscsabai Előre FC as striker.
