= 2003–04 Magyar Kupa =

Tournament details
- Country: Hungary

Final positions
- Champions: Ferencváros
- Runners-up: Budapest Honvéd

The 2003–04 Magyar Kupa (English: Hungarian Cup) was the 64th season of Hungary's annual knock-out cup football competition.

== Quarter-finals ==
Games were played on March 17, 2004.

Team 1	Score	Team 2
Zalaegerszeg	1–0	Videoton
Bodajk	1–3	Ferencváros
Vasas	2–1	Sopron
Tuzsér	0–1	Budapest Honvéd

== Semi-finals ==
Games were played on April 14, 2004.

Team 1	Score	Team 2
Budapest Honvéd	2–1	Zalaegerszeg
Vasas	1–2	Ferencváros

== Final ==
5 May 2004
20:00 (UTC+2)

Budapest Honvéd	1–3	Ferencváros
Bábik 73'	Report	Tököli 36'; Gera 68'; Sowunmi 86'

Puskás Ferenc Stadion, Budapest
Attendance: 4,500
Referee: Attila Hanacsek (Hungary)

== See also ==
- 2003–04 Nemzeti Bajnokság I
- 2003–04 Nemzeti Bajnokság II
- 2003–04 Nemzeti Bajnokság III
