= Zoltán Bánföldi =

Hungarian footballer

Personal information
- Date of birth: 27 July 1971 (age 55)
- Place of birth: Vác, Hungary
- Height: 1.83 m (6 ft 0 in)
- Position: Midfielder

Senior career*
Years	Team	Apps	(Gls)
1988–1997	Vác-Újbuda LTC	73	(2)
1997–1998	Tiszakécske FC	16	(0)
1998–2000	Budapest Honvéd FC	33	(2)
2000–2004	Békéscsabai Előre FC	52	(1)
2004–2006	Vác-Újbuda LTC	37	(12)
- * Club domestic league appearances and goals

Zoltán Bánföldi (born 27 July 1971) is a former Hungarian footballer.

He played for Békéscsabai Előre FC as a midfielder, and finished his career with Vác-Újbuda LTC.
