= Róbert Fekete =

Hungarian footballer

Personal information
- Date of birth: 1 July 1971 (age 55)
- Place of birth: Kiskunfélegyháza, Hungary
- Height: 1.83 m (6 ft 0 in)
- Position: Goalkeeper

Senior career*
Years	Team	Apps	(Gls)
1995–1998	Hajdúszoboszlói SE		
1998–2002	Debreceni VSC		
2002–2004	Békéscsabai Előre FC		
2004–2005	AEP Paphos		
- * Club domestic league appearances and goals

Róbert Fekete (born 1 July 1971) is a Hungarian footballer who played as a goalkeeper.
