= Viktor Valentényi =

Hungarian footballer

Personal information
- Date of birth: 14 October 1977 (age 49)
- Place of birth: Békéscsaba, Hungary
- Height: 1.80 m (5 ft 11 in)
- Position: Defender

Youth career
- Békéscsabai Előre FC

Senior career*
Years	Team	Apps	(Gls)
1997–	Békéscsabai Előre FC	35	(1)

International career
1998–1999	Hungary U-21	1	(0)
- * Club domestic league appearances and goals as of 31 May 2003

Viktor Valentényi (born 14 October 1977) is a Hungarian footballer who plays for Békéscsabai Előre FC as defender.
