= UEFA Euro 2008 qualifying Group C =

Association football competition

Standings and results for Group C of the UEFA Euro 2008 qualifying tournament.

Greece secured qualification to the tournament proper on 17 October 2007 following a 1–0 win against Turkey, becoming the second team in the whole of the qualification stage to do so. Turkey secured qualification to the tournament proper on 21 November 2007 following a 1–0 win against Bosnia and Herzegovina, becoming the twelfth team in the whole of the qualification stage to do so.

== Standings ==
Pos	Team	Pld	W	D	L	GF	GA	GD	Pts	Qualification	(Greece)	(Turkey)	(Norway)	(Bosnia and Herzegovina)	(Moldova)	(Hungary)	(Malta)
1	Greece	12	10	1	1	25	10	+15	31	Qualify for final tournament	—	1–4	1–0	3–2	2–1	2–0	5–0
2	Turkey	12	7	3	2	25	11	+14	24	Qualify for final tournament	0–1	—	2–2	1–0	5–0	3–0	2–0
3	Norway	12	7	2	3	27	11	+16	23		2–2	1–2	—	1–2	2–0	4–0	4–0
4	Bosnia and Herzegovina	12	4	1	7	16	22	−6	13		0–4	3–2	0–2	—	0–1	1–3	1–0
5	Moldova	12	3	3	6	12	19	−7	12 (Note: Tied on head-to-head points (3). Head-to-head goal difference: Moldova +1, Hungary −1.)		0–1	1–1	0–1	2–2	—	3–0	1–1
6	Hungary	12	4	0	8	11	22	−11	12		1–2	0–1	1–4	1–0	2–0	—	2–0
7	Malta	12	1	2	9	10	31	−21	5		0–1	2–2	1–4	2–5	2–3	2–1	—

Source: UEFA
Rules for classification: Qualification tiebreakers

== Matches ==
Group C fixtures were negotiated and finally decided by a draw at a meeting between the participants in Istanbul, Turkey on 17 February 2006.

On 3 July 2006, the Hellenic Football Federation was indefinitely suspended from all international competition due to concerns about its autonomy from the Greek government. Although no announcement was made regarding this tournament in particular, this seemed to preclude the Greek team from participating. Following rectifying action by the Greek government, FIFA subsequently lifted the suspension on 12 July 2006, allowing Greece to participate in qualifying.

2 September 2006
18:15 UTC+2

Malta	2–5	Bosnia and Herzegovina
Pace 6'; M. Mifsud 86'	Report	Barbarez 4'; Hrgović 10'; Bartolović 45+1'; Muslimović 49'; Misimović 51'

Ta' Qali Stadium, Ta' Qali
Attendance: 2,000
Referee: Thomas Vejlgaard (Denmark)
2 September 2006
20:00 UTC+2

Hungary	1–4	Norway
Gera 89' (pen.)	Report	Solskjær 15', 54'; Strømstad 31'; Pedersen 41'

Szusza Ferenc Stadium, Budapest
Attendance: 12,283
Referee: Pieter Vink (Netherlands)
2 September 2006
20:15 UTC+3

Moldova	0–1	Greece
	Report	Lyberopoulos 78'

Zimbru Stadium, Chișinău
Attendance: 10,500
Referee: Matteo Trefoloni (Italy)

6 September 2006
19:00 UTC+2

Norway	2–0	Moldova
Strømstad 74'; Iversen 79'	Report

Ullevaal Stadion, Oslo
Attendance: 23,848
Referee: Hristo Ristoskov (Bulgaria)
6 September 2006
20:00 UTC+2

Turkey	2–0	Malta
Nihat 56'; Tümer 77'	Report

Commerzbank-Arena, Frankfurt (Note: Turkey were ordered to play their first three home matches at a neutral ground and behind closed doors after violence in their World Cup Qualifying playoff with Switzerland on 16 November 2005.)
Attendance: 0
Referee: Bernardino González Vázquez (Spain)
6 September 2006
20:15 UTC+2

Bosnia and Herzegovina	1–3	Hungary
Misimović 64' (pen.)	Report	Huszti 36' (pen.); Gera 46'; Dárdai 49'

Bilino Polje, Zenica
Attendance: 11,800
Referee: Costas Kapitanis (Cyprus)

7 October 2006
19:00 UTC+3

Moldova	2–2	Bosnia and Herzegovina
Rogaciov 13', 32' (pen.)	Report	Misimović 63'; Grlić 68'

Zimbru Stadium, Chișinău
Attendance: 7,114
Referee: Hervé Piccirillo (France)
7 October 2006
19:45 UTC+2

Hungary	0–1	Turkey
	Report	Tuncay 41'

Stadium Puskás Ferenc, Budapest
Attendance: 6,800
Referee: Alain Hamer (Luxembourg)
7 October 2006
21:30 UTC+3

Greece	1–0	Norway
Katsouranis 33'	Report

Karaiskákis Stadium, Athens
Attendance: 21,189
Referee: Lubos Michel (Slovakia)

11 October 2006
19:15 UTC+2

Malta	2–1	Hungary
Schembri 14', 53'	Report	Torghelle 19'

Ta' Qali Stadium, Ta' Qali
Attendance: 3,600
Referee: Johny Ver Eecke (Belgium)
11 October 2006
20:00 UTC+2

Turkey	5–0	Moldova
Şükür 35', 37' (pen.), 43', 73'; Tuncay 68'	Report

Commerzbank-Arena, Frankfurt
Attendance: 0
Referee: Nicolai Vollquartz (Denmark)
11 October 2006
19:15 UTC+2

Bosnia and Herzegovina	0–4	Greece
	Report	Charisteas 8' (pen.); Patsatzoglou 82'; Samaras 85'; Katsouranis 90+4'

Bilino Polje, Zenica
Attendance: 8,000
Referee: Yuri Baskakov (Russia)

24 March 2007
19:00 UTC+2

Moldova	1–1	Malta
Epureanu 85'	Report	Mallia 73'

Zimbru Stadium, Chișinău
Attendance: 8,033
Referee: Vusal Aliyev (Azerbaijan)
24 March 2007
19:00 UTC+1 (Note: Match delayed by 35 minutes by match referee Mike Riley after flares were thrown from the stands, minutes after the kick-off.)

Norway	1–2	Bosnia and Herzegovina
Carew 50' (pen.)	Report	Misimović 18'; Muslimović 33'

Ullevaal Stadion, Oslo
Attendance: 16,987
Referee: Mike Riley (England)
24 March 2007
21:30 UTC+2

Greece	1–4	Turkey
Kyrgiakos 6'	Report	Tuncay 27'; Gökhan 55'; Tümer 70'; Gökdeniz 81'

Karaiskákis Stadium, Athens
Attendance: 31,405
Referee: Wolfgang Stark (Germany)

28 March 2007
18:00 UTC+2

Hungary	2–0	Moldova
Priskin 9'; Gera 63'	Report

Szusza Ferenc Stadium, Budapest
Attendance: 6,150
Referee: Martin Ingvarsson (Sweden)
28 March 2007
19:30 UTC+2

Malta	0–1	Greece
	Report	Basinas 66' (pen.)

Ta' Qali Stadium, Ta' Qali
Attendance: 8,700
Referee: Pedro Proença (Portugal)
28 March 2007
20:00 UTC+2

Turkey	2–2	Norway
Hamit Altıntop 72', 90'	Report	Brenne 31'; Andresen 40'

Commerzbank-Arena, Frankfurt
Attendance: 0
Referee: Stefano Farina (Italy)

2 June 2007
21:30 UTC+3

Greece	2–0	Hungary
Gekas 16'; Seitaridis 29'	Report

Pankritio Stadium, Heraklion (Note: Greece forced to play away from Athens for two matches after crowd disturbances in the game against Turkey on 24 March 2007.)
Attendance: 17,244
Referee: Claus Bo Larsen (Denmark)
2 June 2007
20:00 UTC+2

Bosnia and Herzegovina	3–2	Turkey
Muslimović 27'; Džeko 45+2'; Ćustović 90'	Report	Şükür 13'; Sabri 39'

Asim Ferhatović Hase, Sarajevo
Attendance: 13,800
Referee: Peter Fröjdfeldt (Sweden)
2 June 2007
20:05 UTC+2

Norway	4–0	Malta
Hæstad 31'; Helstad 73'; Iversen 79'; Riise 90+1'	Report

Ullevaal Stadion, Oslo
Attendance: 16,364
Referee: Jacek Granat (Poland)

6 June 2007
19:00 UTC+2

Norway	4–0	Hungary
Iversen 22'; Braaten 57'; Carew 60', 78'	Report

Ullevaal Stadion, Oslo
Attendance: 19,198
Referee: Eduardo Iturralde González (Spain)
6 June 2007
20:15 UTC+2

Bosnia and Herzegovina	1–0	Malta
Muslimović 6'	Report

Asim Ferhatović Hase, Sarajevo
Attendance: 10,500
Referee: Ceri Richards (Wales)
6 June 2007
21:30 UTC+3

Greece	2–1	Moldova
Charisteas 30'; Lyberopoulos 90+5'	Report	Frunză 80'

Pankritio Stadium, Heraklion
Attendance: 19,000
Referee: Jan Wegereef (Netherlands)

8 September 2007
16:00 UTC+2

Hungary	1–0	Bosnia and Herzegovina
Gera 39' (pen.)	Report

Stadion Sóstói, Székesfehérvár
Attendance: 10,877
Referee: Matteo Trefoloni (Italy)
8 September 2007
19:30 UTC+2

Malta	2–2	Turkey
Said 41'; Schembri 76'	Report	Halil Altıntop 45'; Servet 78'

Ta' Qali Stadium, Ta' Qali
Attendance: 10,500
Referee: Stefan Messner (Austria)
8 September 2007
21:00 UTC+3

Moldova	0–1	Norway
	Report	Iversen 49'

Zimbru Stadium, Chișinău
Attendance: 10,173
Referee: Robert Małek (Poland)

12 September 2007
19:00 UTC+2

Norway	2–2	Greece
Carew 15'; Riise 39'	Report	Kyrgiakos 7', 30'

Ullevaal Stadion, Oslo
Attendance: 24,080
Referee: Massimo Busacca (Switzerland)
12 September 2007
20:30 UTC+3

Turkey	3–0	Hungary
Gökhan 68'; Aurélio 72'; Halil Altıntop 90+3'	Report

BJK İnönü Stadium, Istanbul
Attendance: 28,020
Referee: Stuart Dougal (Scotland)
12 September 2007
20:00 UTC+2

Bosnia and Herzegovina	0–1	Moldova
	Report	Bugaev 22'

Asim Ferhatović Hase Stadium, Sarajevo
Attendance: 2,000
Referee: Jouni Hyytiä (Finland)

13 October 2007
16:20 UTC+2

Hungary	2–0	Malta
Feczesin 34'; Tőzsér 77'	Report

Szusza Ferenc Stadium, Budapest
Attendance: 7,633
Referee: Karen Nalbandyan (Armenia)
13 October 2007
21:00 UTC+3

Moldova	1–1	Turkey
Frunză 11'	Report	Ümit 63'

Zimbru Stadium, Chișinău
Attendance: 9,815
Referee: Martin Atkinson (England)
13 October 2007
21:30 UTC+3

Greece	3–2	Bosnia and Herzegovina
Charisteas 10'; Gekas 57'; Lyberopoulos 72'	Report	Hrgović 54'; Ibišević 90'

Olympic Stadium, Athens
Attendance: 30,250
Referee: Grzegorz Gilewski (Poland)

17 October 2007
19:30 UTC+2

Malta	2–3	Moldova
Scerri 71'; M. Mifsud 84' (pen.)	Report	Bugaev 24' (pen.); Frunză 31', 35'

Ta' Qali Stadium, Ta' Qali
Attendance: 7,069
Referee: Igorj Ishchenko (Ukraine)
17 October 2007
20:30 UTC+3

Turkey	0–1	Greece
	Report	Amanatidis 79'

Ali Sami Yen Stadium, Istanbul
Attendance: 22,818
Referee: Manuel Mejuto González (Spain)
17 October 2007
20:30 UTC+2

Bosnia and Herzegovina	0–2	Norway
	Report	Hagen 5'; B. Riise 74'

Asim Ferhatović Hase Stadium, Sarajevo
Attendance: 1,500
Referee: Stéphane Lannoy (France)

17 November 2007
19:00 UTC+2

Moldova	3–0	Hungary
Bugaev 13'; Josan 23'; Alexeev 86'	Report

Zimbru Stadium, Chișinău
Attendance: 6,483
Referee: Pavel Královec (Czech Republic)
17 November 2007
19:00 UTC+1

Norway	1–2	Turkey
Hagen 12'	Report	Emre 31'; Nihat 59'

Ullevaal Stadion, Oslo
Attendance: 23,783
Referee: Markus Merk (Germany)
17 November 2007
21:30 UTC+2

Greece	5–0	Malta
Gekas 32', 72', 74'; Basinas 54'; Amanatidis 61'	Report

Olympic Stadium, Athens
Attendance: 31,332
Referee: Sten Kaldama (Estonia)

21 November 2007
20:00 UTC+1

Malta	1–4	Norway
M. Mifsud 53'	Report	Iversen 25', 27' (pen.), 45'; Pedersen 75'

Ta' Qali Stadium, Ta' Qali
Attendance: 6,000
Referee: Yuri Baskakov (Russia)
21 November 2007
21:00 UTC+2

Turkey	1–0	Bosnia and Herzegovina
Nihat 43'	Report

Ali Sami Yen Stadium, Istanbul
Attendance: 20,106
Referee: Eric Braamhaar (Netherlands)
21 November 2007
20:15 UTC+1

Hungary	1–2	Greece
Buzsáky 7'	Report	Vanczák 22' (o.g.); Basinas 59' (pen.)

Puskás Ferenc Stadium, Budapest
Attendance: 32,300
Referee: Rob Styles (England)

== Goalscorers ==
There were 126 goals scored in 42 matches, for an average of 3 goals per match.

7 goals

- (Norway) Steffen Iversen

5 goals

- (Greece) Theofanis Gekas
- (Turkey) Hakan Şükür

4 goals

- (Bosnia and Herzegovina) Zvjezdan Misimović
- (Bosnia and Herzegovina) Zlatan Muslimović
- (Hungary) Zoltán Gera
- (Moldova) Viorel Frunză
- (Norway) John Carew

3 goals

- (Greece) Angelos Basinas
- (Greece) Angelos Charisteas
- (Greece) Sotirios Kyrgiakos
- (Greece) Nikos Liberopoulos
- (Malta) Michael Mifsud
- (Malta) André Schembri
- (Moldova) Igor Bugaiov
- (Turkey) Nihat Kahveci
- (Turkey) Tuncay Şanlı

2 goals

- (Bosnia and Herzegovina) Mirko Hrgović
- (Greece) Ioannis Amanatidis
- (Greece) Kostas Katsouranis
- (Moldova) Serghei Rogaciov
- (Norway) Erik Hagen
- (Norway) Morten Gamst Pedersen
- (Norway) John Arne Riise
- (Norway) Ole Gunnar Solskjær
- (Norway) Fredrik Strømstad
- (Turkey) Halil Altıntop
- (Turkey) Hamit Altıntop
- (Turkey) Tümer Metin
- (Turkey) Gökhan Ünal

1 goal

- (Bosnia and Herzegovina) Sergej Barbarez
- (Bosnia and Herzegovina) Mladen Bartolović
- (Bosnia and Herzegovina) Adnan Čustović
- (Bosnia and Herzegovina) Edin Džeko
- (Bosnia and Herzegovina) Ivica Grlić
- (Bosnia and Herzegovina) Vedad Ibišević
- (Greece) Christos Patsatzoglou
- (Greece) Georgios Samaras
- (Greece) Giourkas Seitaridis
- (Hungary) Ákos Buzsáky
- (Hungary) Pál Dárdai
- (Hungary) Róbert Feczesin
- (Hungary) Szabolcs Huszti
- (Hungary) Tamás Priskin
- (Hungary) Sándor Torghelle
- (Hungary) Dániel Tőzsér
- (Malta) George Mallia
- (Malta) Jamie Pace
- (Malta) Brian Said
- (Malta) Terence Scerri
- (Moldova) Serghei Alexeev
- (Moldova) Alexandru Epureanu
- (Moldova) Nicolae Josan
- (Norway) Martin Andresen
- (Norway) Daniel Braaten
- (Norway) Simen Brenne
- (Norway) Kristofer Hæstad
- (Norway) Thorstein Helstad
- (Norway) Bjørn Helge Riise
- (Turkey) Mehmet Aurélio
- (Turkey) Emre Belözoğlu
- (Turkey) Servet Çetin
- (Turkey) Gökdeniz Karadeniz
- (Turkey) Ümit Karan
- (Turkey) Sabri Sarıoğlu

1 own goal

- (Hungary) Vilmos Vanczák (against Greece)
