= Attila Simon (footballer, born 1979) =

Hungarian footballer

Personal information
- Full name: Attila Simon
- Date of birth: 9 October 1979 (age 47)
- Place of birth: Békéscsaba, Hungary
- Height: 1.80 m (5 ft 11 in)
- Position: Midfielder

Team information
- Current team: Békéscsabai SE
- Number: 11

Youth career
- 1997–2002: Békéscsabai SE

Senior career*
| Years | Team | Apps | (Gls) |
| 2002–2003 | Újpest FC | 6 | (0) |
| 2003–2005 | Békéscsaba | 41 | (0) |
| 2005–2006 | Videoton FC Fehérvár | 3 | (0) |
| 2006 | Diósgyőri VTK | 7 | (0) |
| 2006–2007 | Dunaújváros FC | 13 | (2) |
| 2007–2009 | Pine Rivers | ? | (?) |
| 2009 | Békéscsaba | 4 | (0) |
| 2009–2010 | Kaposvölgye VSC | 9 | (0) |
| 2010–2011 | Battonyai TK | 4 | (0) |
| 2011– | Békéscsaba | 9 | (0) |
- * Club domestic league appearances and goals as of 17 April 2011

Attila Simon (born 9 October 1979) is a Hungarian footballer who currently plays as a midfielder for Békéscsaba 1912 Előre SE.
