= Gabriel Vochin =

Romanian footballer

Personal information
- Date of birth: 26 December 1973 (age 52)
- Place of birth: Bucharest, Romania
- Position: Central defender

Senior career*
Years	Team	Apps	(Gls)
1991–1996	Sportul Studenţesc	71	(4)
1996–1997	Naţional București	25	(1)
1998	Farul Constanţa	13	(1)
1998	Naţional București	12	(0)
1999	Farul Constanţa	16	(1)
1999–2000	FC U Craiova	29	(0)
2000	Rocar Bucuresti	11	(0)
2001–2002	Ceahlăul Piatra Neamţ	16	(2)
2002	FC U Craiova	10	(0)
2002–2004	Videoton	36	(2)
2004–2005	Hapoel Nazareth Illit	30	(0)
2005–2006	Hapoel Be'er Sheva		
2006–2007	Maccabi Ahi Nazareth	33	(0)
Total		269	(11)

International career
1996	Romania	1	(0)
- * Club domestic league appearances and goals

Gabriel Vochin (born 26 December 1973) is a Romanian former professional football player.
