= Tibor Bábik =

Hungarian footballer

Personal information
- Date of birth: 12 November 1973 (age 52)
- Place of birth: Paks, Hungary
- Height: 1.78 m (5 ft 10 in)
- Position: Defender

Senior career*
Years	Team	Apps	(Gls)
1992–1998	Paksi SE	29	(2)
1998–2000	Vác-Újbuda LTC	30	(1)
1999	→ Palotás SE (loan)	8	(3)
2000–2002	Szolnoki MÁV FC	19	(1)
2002–2003	Nyíregyháza Spartacus	34	(4)
2003–2005	Budapest Honvéd FC	42	(5)
2005–2006	Jászapáti VSE	11	(1)
2006–2007	Nyíregyháza Spartacus	13	(0)
Total		186	(17)
- * Club domestic league appearances and goals

Tibor Bábik (born 12 November 1973 in Paks) is a Hungarian football (defender) player who has spent most of his career playing for Paksi SE.
