= József Bujáki =

Hungarian footballer

Personal information
- Date of birth: 13 December 1975 (age 50)
- Place of birth: Budapest, Hungary
- Height: 1.77 m (5 ft 10 in)
- Position: Defender

Youth career
- Budapest Honvéd FC

Senior career*
Years	Team	Apps	(Gls)
1994–1995	Budapest Honvéd FC	1	(0)
1995–1996	Tiszakécskei FC	?	(?)
1996–1997	Soroksári TE	?	(?)
1997–1998	Tiszakécskei FC	25	(0)
1998–1999	Budapest Honvéd FC	0	(0)
1999–2001	Ceglédi VSE	?	(?)
2001–	Békéscsabai Előre FC	15	(0)
- * Club domestic league appearances and goals as of 31 May 2003

József Bujáki (born 13 December 1975) is a Hungarian footballer who plays for Békéscsabai Előre FC as a defender.
