= Fredrik Strømstad =

Norwegian footballer (born 1982)

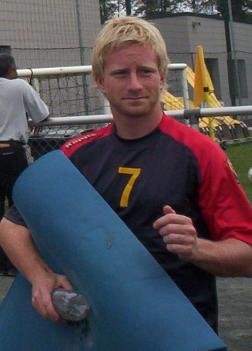

Personal information
- Date of birth: 20 January 1982 (age 44)
- Place of birth: Kristiansand, Norway
- Height: 1.67 m (5 ft 5 1/2 in)
- Positions: Attacking midfielder; winger

Team information
- Current team: Tigerberget
- Number: 7

Youth career
- Start

Senior career*
Years	Team	Apps	(Gls)
2001–2008	Start	177	(19)
2002	→ Bærum (loan)	8	(3)
2008–2012	Le Mans	40	(0)
2010–2011	→ Start (loan)	20	(0)
2012	Start	15	(1)
2013–	Tigerberget		

International career^{‡}
2002	Norway U21	2	(0)
2005–2008	Norway	17	(2)
- * Club domestic league appearances and goals as of 1 December 2008 ‡ National team caps and goals as of 11 November 2012

Fredrik Strømstad (born 20 January 1982) is a Norwegian football player.

== Career ==
In 2002, he was loaned to Bærum SK and helped them win promotion to the Norwegian First Division.

He signed for the French club Le Mans Union Club 72 on June 13, 2008, and joined the club on July 7 the same year.

After spending the 2012 season at a new spell in IK Start, he retired from professional football. He did continue in 2013 with seventh-tier club Tigerberget FK.

=== National team ===
Strømstad made his debut for the national team in the World Cup qualifier against Belarus in October 2005.

== Playing style ==
Strømstad is renowned for his work rate and passing ability, and his stamina. He has been compared to former Norwegian midfielder Erik Mykland. When he played for Start he often linked up with teammate Kristofer Hæstad in midfield.
