= György Kiss (footballer) =

Hungarian footballer

Personal information
- Full name: György Kiss
- Date of birth: 22 May 1975 (age 51)
- Place of birth: Nyíregyháza, Hungary
- Height: 5 ft 11 in (1.80 m)
- Position: Defender

Senior career*
Years	Team	Apps	(Gls)
2001–2003	Dunaferr	34	(3)
2003–?	Ferencváros		
- Vasas
2006	Chesterfield	0	(0)
2006–2008	Nantwich Town	22	(2)
- * Club domestic league appearances and goals

György Kiss (born 22 May 1975) was a Hungarian football defender who last played for Nantwich Town in the Northern Premier League Division One South in 2008. He previously worked for West Bromwich Albion in the medical team. He now does so for Stoke City FC.

== Club career ==
Kiss previously played for Dunaferr, Ferencváros and Vasas in the Nemzeti Bajnokság I, where he made 182 league appearances.
