= 2003–04 Nemzeti Bajnokság I =

Hungarian football season

Nemzeti Bajnokság I
- Season: 2003–04
- Dates: 25 July 2003 – 27 May 2004
- Champions: Ferencváros
- Relegated: Siófok; Haladás
- Champions League: Ferencváros
- UEFA Cup: Újpest
- Intertoto Cup: Debrecen; Sopron
- Matches: 192
- Goals: 499 (2.6 per match)
- Top goalscorer: Mihály Tóth (17)
- Biggest home win: Zalaegerszeg 7–0 Haladás
- Biggest away win: Haladás 0–4 Siófok; Győr 1–5 Debrecen; Ferencváros 0–4 Siófok
- Highest scoring: Videoton 6–1 Haladás; Zalaegerszeg 7–0 Haladás; Győr 4–3 Zalaegerszeg

The 2003–04 Nemzeti Bajnokság I, also known as NB I, was the 102nd season of top-tier football in Hungary. The league was officially named Arany Ászok Liga for sponsoring reasons. The season started on 25 July 2003 and ended on 27 May 2004.

== Overview ==
It was contested by 12 teams, and Ferencvárosi TC won the championship under headcoach Attila Pintér. The green and whites started the season well, winning 9 of their 16 matches of the first half of the campaign. However, the team went on a 4-game losing streak in April, including a blow-out 0-4 loss against Balaton FC at home, and two 1-goal losses to their two biggest rivals, MTK and Újpest. The purple and whites on the other hand won five consecutive games in the same timeframe, and defeated Ferencváros twice within a 3-week period, with the latter being on the penultimate day of the season.

Going into the last gameday, Újpest were leading the table by one point, and looked destined to win their first championship since 1998. Much to their misfortune, they were unable to beat MTK, as the teams drew 1-1, while Ferencváros defeated Debrecen 3-1 in front of 10,000 people at Üllői Út to win their 28th national championship.

== First stage ==
=== League standings ===
Pos	Team	Pld	W	D	L	GF	GA	GD	Pts	Qualification
1	Ferencváros	22	12	8	2	29	15	+14	44	Qualification for championship playoff
2	Siófok	22	12	5	5	24	11	+13	41	Qualification for championship playoff
3	Debrecen	22	11	6	5	34	17	+17	39	Qualification for championship playoff
4	MTK Hungária	22	10	8	4	35	21	+14	38	Qualification for championship playoff
5	Újpest	22	9	8	5	32	22	+10	35	Qualification for championship playoff
6	Sopron	22	8	7	7	35	28	+7	31	Qualification for championship playoff
7	Pécs	22	6	9	7	19	21	−2	27	Qualification for relegation playoff
8	Videoton	22	5	8	9	27	37	−10	23	Qualification for relegation playoff
9	Zalaegerszeg	22	5	5	12	24	35	−11	20	Qualification for relegation playoff
10	Győr	22	5	5	12	23	38	−15	20	Qualification for relegation playoff
11	Békéscsaba	22	4	7	11	23	34	−11	19	Qualification for relegation playoff
12	Haladás	22	3	8	11	12	38	−26	17	Qualification for relegation playoff

Source: rsssf.com

=== Results ===
Home \ Away	BÉK	DEB	FTC	GYŐ	HAL	MTK	PÉC	SIÓ	SOP	UTE	VID	ZTE
Békéscsaba		1–2	0–0	2–0	2–2	1–2	1–0	1–1	3–3	0–1	2–2	3–1
Debrecen	1–0		5–0	1–0	3–0	2–2	1–0	0–1	0–0	3–3	2–0	4–0
Ferencváros	2–0	0–0		4–0	2–0	2–1	3–0	0–1	2–0	2–1	2–2	0–0
Győr	1–0	1–5	0–1		6–0	1–1	1–1	0–0	3–1	0–0	2–2	4–3
Haladás	1–1	0–0	0–1	2–0		1–1	0–0	0–4	0–0	0–2	3–0	0–1
MTK Hungária	2–0	2–0	1–1	4–1	2–0		1–2	1–0	2–1	0–1	2–2	2–0
Pécs	3–0	0–0	0–1	1–0	1–1	1–1		0–2	2–0	1–1	3–1	1–0
Siófok	2–0	1–0	1–1	1–0	2–0	0–2	2–0		0–0	1–0	1–0	0–1
Sopron	2–2	1–3	0–0	1–2	5–0	2–1	3–1	2–1		1–1	5–0	2–1
Újpest	3–1	3–1	1–1	4–1	0–0	1–1	1–1	0–1	1–3		1–2	2–0
Videoton	1–2	2–0	1–2	2–0	1–2	1–1	1–1	2–1	2–0	0–2		2–2
Zalaegerszeg	2–1	0–1	1–2	2–0	4–0	1–3	0–0	1–1	1–3	2–3	1–1	

Source: rsssf.com
Legend: Blue = home team win; Yellow = draw; Red = away team win.

== Second stage ==
=== Championship playoff ===
==== League standings ====
Pos	Team	Pld	W	D	L	GF	GA	GD	Pts	Qualification or relegation
1	Ferencváros (C)	32	16	9	7	44	30	+14	57	Qualification for Champions League second qualifying round
2	Újpest	32	15	11	6	48	29	+19	56	Qualification for UEFA Cup first qualifying round
3	Debrecen	32	16	8	8	51	32	+19	56	Qualification for Intertoto Cup first round
4	Siófok (R)	32	14	8	10	34	24	+10	50	Relegation to Nemzeti Bajnokság II
5	Sopron	32	13	9	10	53	42	+11	48	Qualification for Intertoto Cup first round
6	MTK Hungária	32	11	11	10	42	40	+2	44	

Source: rsssf.com
(C) Champions; (R) Relegated

==== Results ====
Home \ Away	DEB	FTC	MTK	SIÓ	SOP	UTE
Debrecen		3–2	2–2	3–0	1–2	2–0
Ferencváros	3–1		2–0	0–4	3–0	0–1
MTK Hungária	0–1	1–0		0–2	1–2	1–1
Siófok	1–1	2–3	0–0		0–1	0–1
Sopron	2–3	2–2	4–1	3–0		1–1
Újpest	0–2	1–0	5–1	1–1	2–1	

Source: rsssf.com
Legend: Blue = home team win; Yellow = draw; Red = away team win.

=== Relegation playoff ===
==== League standings ====
Pos	Team	Pld	W	D	L	GF	GA	GD	Pts	Relegation
7	Pécs	32	9	13	10	36	37	−1	40	
8	Videoton	32	10	10	12	55	51	+4	40	
9	Zalaegerszeg	32	11	6	15	45	47	−2	39	
10	Győr	32	10	6	16	36	54	−18	36	
11	Békéscsaba (O)	32	8	8	16	36	50	−14	32	Qualification for the relegation play-offs
12	Haladás (O, R)	32	4	11	17	19	63	−44	23	Qualification for the relegation play-offs

Source: rsssf.com
(O) Play-off winners; (R) Relegated

==== Results ====
Home \ Away	BÉK	GYŐ	HAL	PÉC	VID	ZTE
Békéscsaba		2–0	2–0	1–1	2–0	2–3
Győr	3–0		3–2	1–3	0–4	2–1
Haladás	2–1	0–0		1–1	0–2	1–1
Pécs	3–0	0–2	2–0		3–3	1–3
Videoton	1–3	4–1	6–1	3–3		5–0
Zalaegerszeg	3–0	0–1	7–0	2–0	1–0	

Source: rsssf.com
Legend: Blue = home team win; Yellow = draw; Red = away team win.

== Promotion/relegation play-offs ==
=== Overview ===
Team 1	Agg.	Team 2	1st leg	2nd leg
Rákospalota	1–3	Békéscsaba	0–1	1–2
Nyíregyháza	1–2	Haladás	0–1	1–1

=== Matches ===
2 June 2004

Rákospalota	0–1	Békéscsaba
	Report	Udvari 47'

Budai II. László Stadion, Budapest
Attendance: 500
Referee: Attila Ábrahám
5 June 2004

Békéscsaba	2–1	Rákospalota
Szeverény 13'; G. Tóth 78'	Report	Nyerges 90+2'

Kórház utcai Stadion, Békéscsaba
Attendance: 2,000
Referee: Attila Hanacsek

2 June 2004

Nyíregyháza	0–1	Haladás
	Report	Németh 11' (o.g.)

Városi Stadion, Nyíregyháza
Attendance: 2,500
Referee: Ferenc Bede
5 June 2004

Haladás	1–1	Nyíregyháza
Illés 21'	Report	Popan 83'

Rohonci út, Szombathely
Attendance: 3,500
Referee: Viktor Kassai

== Statistical leaders ==
=== Top goalscorers ===
Rank	Scorer	Club	Goals
1	(Hungary) Mihály Tóth	FC Sopron	17
2	(Hungary) Zoltán Gera	Ferencvárosi TC	11
3	(Hungary) Róbert Waltner	Zalaegerszegi TE	10
4	(Hungary) Péter Bajzát	Debreceni VSC	9
4	(Hungary) Zoltán Hercegfalvi	Videoton FC	9
4	(Hungary) Béla Kovács	Előre FC Békéscsaba	9
4	(Hungary) Zoltán Kovács	Újpest FC	9
4	(Hungary) Sándor Torghelle	MTK Budapest FC	9
9	(Hungary) Zsombor Kerekes	Pécsi Mecsek FC	8
9	(Hungary) Attila Tököli	Ferencvárosi TC	8

== Attendances ==
#	Club	Average
1	Debrecen	5,413
2	Ferencváros	5,410
3	Zalaegerszeg	4,206
4	Sopron	3,675
5	Pécs	3,488
6	Szombathelyi Haladás	3,219
7	Békéscsaba	3,213
8	Újpest	3,092
9	Videoton	2,338
10	Siófok	2,282
11	MTK	2,188
12	Győr	1,656

== See also ==
- 2003–04 Magyar Kupa
- 2003–04 Nemzeti Bajnokság II
- 2003–04 Nemzeti Bajnokság III
