= Duško Grujić =

Serbian footballer

Personal information
- Full name: Dušan Grujić
- Date of birth: September 15, 1972 (age 54)
- Place of birth: Kula, SFR Yugoslavia
- Height: 1.87 m (6 ft 2 in)
- Position: Central defender

Senior career*
Years	Team	Apps	(Gls)
1991–1994	Hajduk Kula	84	(5)
1994–1997	Vojvodina	52	(5)
1996	→ Borac Čačak (loan)	15	(0)
1998–2000	Greuther Fürth		
2000–2001	Guangdong Hongyuan	38	(0)
2002–2005	Békéscsaba	65	(1)
- * Club domestic league appearances and goals as of May 31, 2005

Duško Grujić (Serbian Cyrillic: Душко Грујић; born September 15, 1972) is a former Serbian footballer.

== Career ==
Born in Kula, SR Serbia, Grujić played as defender with Serbian sides FK Hajduk Kula, FK Vojvodina and FK Borac Čačak before going abroad and playing with German side Greuther Fürth, Chinese Guangdong Hongyuan and Hungarian Békéscsaba Előre.

By Autumn 2016 he was vice-director of the youth team of FK Vojvodina. In 2020 his role was described as the club's academy director.

== External sources ==
- Duško Grujić at Playerhistory
