= Attila Tököli =

Hungarian footballer (born 1976)

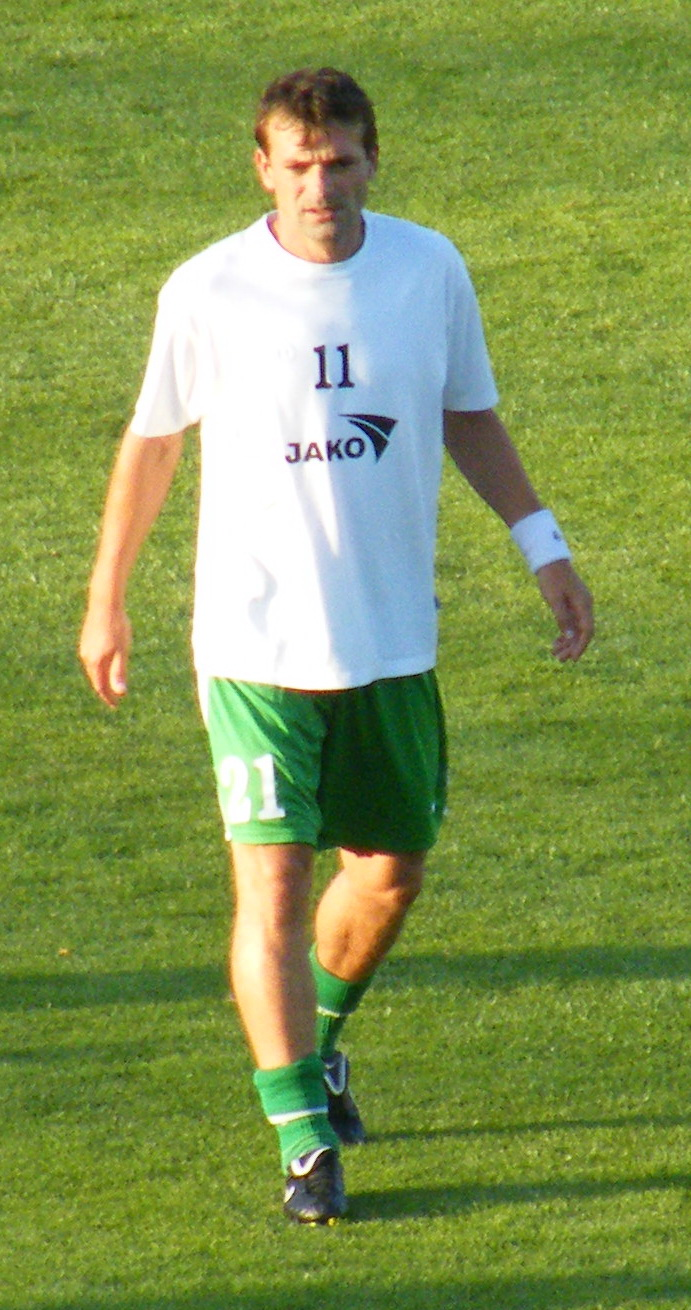
- Tököli in 2009

Personal information
- Date of birth: 14 May 1976 (age 50)
- Place of birth: Pécs, Hungary
- Height: 1.80 m (5 ft 11 in)
- Position: Forward

Senior career*
Years	Team	Apps	(Gls)
1993–1997	Pécs	66	(16)
1997–2002	Dunaújváros	163	(102)
2002–2004	Ferencváros	51	(23)
2004–2005	1. FC Köln	4	(0)
2005	Famagusta	10	(1)
2006	Limassol	6	(1)
2006–2007	Ferencváros	25	(19)
2007–2010	Paks	77	(42)
2010–2012	Kecskemét	50	(20)
2011–2012	→ Zalaegerszeg (loan)	11	(1)
2012–2014	Paks	39	(6)
Total		502	(231)

International career
2000–2011	Hungary	25	(3)
- * Club domestic league appearances and goals

Attila Tököli (born 14 May 1976) is a Hungarian former professional footballer who played as a forward.

== Honours ==
Dunaferr SE

- Nemzeti Bajnokság I: 1999–2000
- Nemzeti Bajnokság II Western Group: 1997–98

Ferencváros

- Nemzeti Bajnokság I: 2003–04
- Hungarian Cup: 2002–03, 2003–04
- Hungarian Super Cup: 2004; runner up 2003

Paks

- Hungarian League Cup:; runner-up 2009–10

Kecskemét

- Hungarian Cup: 2010–11

=== Individual ===
- Hungarian League top goalscorer: 1999–2000, 2001–02
