= 2008–09 Ferencvárosi TC season =

Ferencváros
2008–09 season
- Chairman: Krisztián Berki
- Manager: Bobby Davidson
- Stadium: Üllői úti stadion
- Nemzeti bajnokság II (east): 1st (promoted)
- Magyar Kupa: Round of 32
- Ligakupa: Group stage
- Top goalscorer: League: István Ferenczi (39); All: István Ferenczi (40)

The 2008–09 season was Ferencvárosi Torna Club's 3rd competitive season, 3rd consecutive season in the Nemzeti Bajnokság II and 109th year in existence as a football club.In addition to the domestic league, Ferencváros participated in this season's editions of the Magyar Kupa, and Ligakupa.

== Squad ==
As of match played 21 July 2009

No.	Name	Nationality	Position	Date of birth (age)	Signed from	Signed in	Apps.	Goals
Goalkeepers
1	Péter Szappanos	(Hungary)	GK	4 November 1990 (aged 18)	youth sector	2009	0	0
16	Ádám Holczer	(Hungary)	GK	28 March 1988 (aged 21)	youth sector	2008	25	0
18	Jan-Michael Williams	(Trinidad and Tobago)	GK	26 October 1984 (aged 24)	White Star	2008	9	0
42	Balázs Megyeri	(Hungary)	GK	31 March 1990 (aged 19)	youth sector	2009	2	0
69	Bence Hermány	(Hungary)	GK	27 April 1990 (aged 19)	youth sector	2009	0	0
90	Balázs Pintér	(Hungary)	GK	12 February 1990 (aged 19)	youth sector	2007	0	0
Defenders
3	Craig Short	(England)	DF	25 June 1968 (aged 40)	Sheffield United	2009	0	0
4	Dániel Sváb	(Hungary)	DF	2 September 1990 (aged 18)	youth sector	2009	0	0
5	Igor Szkukalek	(Slovakia)	DF	1 July 1976 (aged 32)	Dunajská Streda	2008	93	3
14	Matthew Lowton	(England)	DF	9 June 1989 (aged 20)	Sheffield United	2009	11	0
19	Tibor Baranyai	(Hungary)	DF	29 April 1978 (aged 31)	Videoton	2008	12	0
26	Attila Dragóner	(Hungary)	DF	15 November 1974 (aged 34)	Vitória Guimarães	2006	218	30
29	Noel Fülöp	(Hungary)	DF	29 January 1988 (aged 21)	youth sector	2006	21	2
33	Balázs Vattai	(Hungary)	DF	25 October 1990 (aged 18)	youth sector	2009	0	0
37	Péter Országh	(Hungary)	DF	27 July 1990 (aged 18)	youth sector	2009	0	0
39	Rafe Wolfe	(Jamaica)	DF	19 December 1985 (aged 23)	White Star	2008	20	0
78	Zoltán Balog	(Hungary)	DF	22 February 1978 (aged 31)	Viborg	2009	140	3
82	Zoltán Csiszár	(Hungary)	DF	7 July 1982 (aged 26)	Orosháza	2008	27	0
Midfielders
6	Péter Lipcsei	(Hungary)	MF	28 March 1972 (aged 37)	Austria Salzburg	2000	403	102
7	Liban Abdi	(Norway)	MF	5 October 1988 (aged 20)	Sheffield United	2008	7	2
8	James Ashmore	(England)	MF	2 March 1986 (aged 23)	Sheffield United	2008	17	4
11	Wolry Wolfe	(Jamaica)	MF	12 August 1981 (aged 27)	Joe Public	2009	5	0
17	Sam Wedgbury	(England)	MF	26 February 1989 (aged 20)	Sheffield United	2009	11	1
21	Norbert Zsivóczky	(Hungary)	MF	16 February 1988 (aged 21)	youth sector	2006	32	5
22	Sékou Tidiane	(Ivory Coast)	MF	9 April 1983 (aged 26)	Sheffield United	2008	12	0
23	Imre Deme	(Hungary)	MF	3 August 1983 (aged 25)	Tatabánya	2006	47	2
25	James Morrison	(Jamaica)	MF	7 June 1984 (aged 25)	White Star	2008	19	1
30	Bence Tóth	(Hungary)	MF	22 July 1989 (aged 19)	youth sector	2008	28	4
38	Bamba Moussa	(Ivory Coast)	MF	6 January 1985 (aged 24)	Sheffield United	2008	18	1
51	Máté Vass	(Hungary)	DF	17 October 1990 (aged 18)	youth sector	2009	2	0
79	Lamine Kourouma	(Guinea)	MF	1 January 1987 (aged 22)	Sheffield United	2008	18	2
87	László Fitos	(Hungary)	MF	27 February 1987 (aged 22)	youth sector	2005	73	5
77	Krisztián Kiss	(Hungary)	MF	26 December 1990 (aged 18)	youth sector	2008	1	0
Forwards
9	Tibor Márkus	(Hungary)	FW	10 October 1987 (aged 21)	Paks	2009	1	1
10	Paul Shaw	(England)	FW	4 September 1973 (aged 35)	Oxford United	2008	38	20
13	István Ferenczi	(Hungary)	FW	14 September 1977 (aged 31)	Barnsley	2008	24	39
17	Ádám Heitler	(Hungary)	FW	16 February 1988 (aged 21)	youth sector	2009	0	0
24	Bálint Nyilasi	(Hungary)	FW	20 March 1990 (aged 19)	youth sector	2008	0	0
27	Zsolt Kutasi	(Hungary)	FW	15 January 1989 (aged 20)	youth sector	2008	1	0
28	István Kovács	(Hungary)	FW	17 June 1991 (aged 18)	youth sector	2009	1	0
36	Igor Pisanjuk	(Canada)	FW	24 October 1989 (aged 19)	youth sector	2008	6	0
40	Dramane Kamaté	(Ivory Coast)	FW	31 August 1985 (aged 23)	Sheffield United	2008	12	2
60	Péter Pölöskei	(Hungary)	FW	1 August 1988 (aged 20)	Szombathelyi Haladás	2008	12	3
92	Jordan Robertson	(England)	FW	12 February 1988 (aged 21)	Sheffield United	2009	8	3
Players away on loan
31	Carlos Diaz	(United States)	MF	15 April 1987 (aged 22)	Newcastle United	2009	0	0
88	Dávid Kulcsár	(Hungary)	MF	25 February 1988 (aged 21)	youth sector	2006	22	2
Players who left during the season
9	Matthew Bartholomew	(Trinidad and Tobago)	FW	20 October 1988 (aged 20)	White Star	2008	0	0
11	Aaron Downing	(Trinidad and Tobago)	FW	11 January 1988 (aged 21)	White Star	2008	1	0
14	Tamás Szalai	(Hungary)	MF	12 June 1984 (aged 25)	youth sector	2003	38	2
15	László Bartha	(Hungary)	FW	9 February 1987 (aged 22)	youth sector	2005	78	13
20	László Brettschneider	(Hungary)	MF	22 January 1985 (aged 24)	youth sector	2005	18	3

== Transfers ==
=== Summer ===
In: Note: Flags indicate national team as defined under FIFA eligibility rules; some limited exceptions apply. Players may hold more than one non-FIFA nationality.

No.	Pos.	Nation	Player
4	DF	HUN	József Nagy (loan return from Kozármisleny)
7	MF	NOR	Liban Abdi (from (England) Sheffield United)
7	FW	HUN	Dávid Horváth (loan return from Soroksár)
8	MF	ENG	James Ashmore (from (England) Sheffield United)
9	FW	TTO	Matthew Bartholomew (from (Belgium) White Star)
13	FW	HUN	István Ferenczi (from (England) Barnsley)
18	GK	TTO	Jan-Michael Williams (from (Belgium) White Star)
25	MF	JAM	Jason Morrison (from (Belgium) White Star)
27	MF	HUN	Richárd Csepregi (loan return from Soroksár)
39	DF	JAM	Rafe Wolfe (from (Belgium) White Star)
42	GK	HUN	Balázs Megyeri (from (England) Bristol City)
60	FW	HUN	Péter Pölöskei (from Szombathelyi Haladás)

Out: Note: Flags indicate national team as defined under FIFA eligibility rules; some limited exceptions apply. Players may hold more than one non-FIFA nationality.

No.	Pos.	Nation	Player
4	DF	HUN	József Nagy (to Kecskemét)
5	DF	HUN	Sándor Nagy (to Kecskemét)
7	FW	HUN	Dávid Horváth (to Cegléd)
7	FW	CMR	Edouard Ndjodo (loan return to Budapest Honvéd)
9	MF	HUN	Krisztián Lisztes (to Rákospalota)
13	MF	HUN	Ottó Vincze (to (Austria) St. Margarethen)
17	DF	HUN	János Mátyus (to Tatabánya)
19	DF	HUN	Tibor Baranyai (loan return to Fehérvár)
22	MF	CIV	Sékou Tidiane (loan return to (England) Sheffield United)
27	MF	HUN	Richárd Csepregi (loan to Szigetszentmiklós)
35	GK	HUN	Kálmán Szabó (to Szigetszentmiklós)
50	DF	HUN	Zoltán Vasas (to (Slovakia) Dunajska Streda)

=== Winter ===
In: Note: Flags indicate national team as defined under FIFA eligibility rules; some limited exceptions apply. Players may hold more than one non-FIFA nationality.

No.	Pos.	Nation	Player
9	FW	HUN	Tibor Márkus (loan from Paks)
14	DF	ENG	Matthew Lowton (loan from (England) Sheffield United)
17	MF	ENG	Sam Wedgbury (loan from (England) Sheffield United)
27	MF	HUN	Richárd Csepregi (loan return from Szigetszentmiklós)
31	MF	USA	Carlos Diaz (from (England) Newcastle United)
78	DF	HUN	Zoltán Balog (from (Denmark) Viborg)
—	MF	CHN	Wu Bo (loan from (China) Sichuan)
—	FW	ENG	Jordan Robertson (loan from (England) Sheffield United)
—	MF	JAM	Wolry Wolfe (loan from (Trinidad and Tobago) Joe Public)
—	RW	CHN	Gao Xiang (loan from (China) Chengdu Tiancheng)

Out: Note: Flags indicate national team as defined under FIFA eligibility rules; some limited exceptions apply. Players may hold more than one non-FIFA nationality.

No.	Pos.	Nation	Player
9	FW	TTO	Matthew Bartholomew (to (Trinidad and Tobago) W Connection)
11	FW	TTO	Aaron Downing (to (Trinidad and Tobago) W Connection)
14	MF	HUN	Tamás Szalai (to Tatabánya)
15	FW	HUN	László Bartha (to Kozármisleny)
20	MF	HUN	László Brettschneider (Retired)
27	MF	HUN	Richárd Csepregi (to (Maldives) Club Valencia)
31	MF	USA	Carlos Diaz (loan to Tököl)
88	MF	HUN	Dávid Kulcsár (loan to Vecsés)

== Competitions ==
=== Overview ===
Competition	First match	Last match	Starting round	Final position	Record							
Competition	First match	Last match	Starting round	Final position	Pld	W	D	L	GF	GA	GD	Win %
Nemzeti Bajnokság II	11 August 2008	13 June 2009	Matchday 1	Winners	30	25	3	2	94	22	+72	83.33
Magyar Kupa	28 August 2008	25 September 2008	Round of 128	Round of 32	3	1	1	1	11	3	+8	33.33
Ligakupa	1 October 2008	15 February 2009	Group stage	Group stage	10	5	4	1	20	10	+10	50.00
Total					43	31	8	4	125	35	+90	72.09

Last updated: 13 June 2009
Source: Competitions

=== Nemzeti Bajnokság II ===
==== League table ====
Pos	Team	Pld	W	D	L	GF	GA	GD	Pts	Promotion or relegation
1	Ferencváros (P)	30	25	3	2	94	22	+72	78	Promotion to Nemzeti Bajnokság I
2	Debrecen II	30	19	4	7	72	38	+34	61	
3	Makó	30	17	5	8	61	44	+17	56	
4	Bőcs	30	15	7	8	56	34	+22	52	
5	Kazincbarcika	30	14	9	7	52	47	+5	51	

Source: Hungarian Football Federation (in Hungarian), Soccerway
Rules for classification: 1) Points; 2) Matches won; 3) Goal difference; 4) Goals scored; 5) Head-to-head points; 6) Head-to-head goal difference; 7) Head-to-head away goals scored; 8) Fair play ranking; 9) Drawing of lots.
(P) Promoted

==== Results summary ====
Overall								Home						Away					
Pld	W	D	L	GF	GA	GD	Pts	W	D	L	GF	GA	GD	W	D	L	GF	GA	GD
30	25	3	2	94	22	+72	78	14	1	0	59	13	+46	11	2	2	35	9	+26

Last updated: 13 June 2009.
Source: Soccerway

==== Results by round ====
Round	1	2	3	4	5	6	7	8	9	10	11	12	13	14	15	16	17	18	19	20	21	22	23	24	25	26	27	28	29	30
Ground	H	A	H	A	H	H	A	H	A	H	A	H	A	H	A	A	H	A	H	A	A	H	A	H	A	H	A	H	A	H
Result	W	L	W	W	W	W	W	W	D	D	D	W	W	W	W	W	W	W	W	W	W	W	W	W	W	W	W	W	L	W
Position	1	6	4	2	2	2	2	2	1	2	2	2	1	1	1	1	1	1	1	1	1	1	1	1	1	1	1	1	1	1

Updated to match(es) played on 13 June 2009. Source: Matches
A = Away; H = Home; W = Win; D = Draw; L = Loss

==== Matches ====
11 August 2008 1	Ferencváros	6–2	Tököl	Budapest
19:00 CEST	Shaw 10', 63'; Ferenczi 45', 59', 83'; Gálhidi 47' (o.g.)	Report	Gasparik 20'; Csabai 75'; Vedres (red card) 80'	Stadium: Üllői úti Stadion; Attendance: 8,000; Referee: Tamás Bognár

17 August 2008 2	Bőcs	2–1	Ferencváros	Miskolc
17:30 CEST	Bardi 25'; Martis 39'	Report	Ferenczi 53'	Stadium: DVTK Stadion; Attendance: 3,000; Referee: Gábor Oláh

25 August 2008 3	Ferencváros	6–1	Békéscsaba	Budapest
19:00 CEST	Ferenczi 22', 27', 39', 46'; Dragóner 62'; Shaw 83'	Report	Pozsár 75'; Máthé (red card) 7'; Okos (red card) 66'	Stadium: Üllői úti Stadion; Attendance: 6,500; Referee: János Takács

1 September 2008 4	BKV Előre	0–2	Ferencváros	Budapest
19:00 CEST		Report	Ashmore 17'; Shaw 45'	Stadium: Illovszky Rudolf Stadion; Attendance: 2,500; Referee: Gergely Sulyok

7 September 2008 5	Ferencváros	1–0	Jászberény	Budapest
18:00 CEST	Shaw 20'	Report		Stadium: Üllői úti Stadion; Attendance: 5,000; Referee: József Berger

15 September 2008 6	Ferencváros	8–1	Szolnok	Budapest
19:00 CEST	Tóth 25'; Shaw 36', 63'; Ferenczi 57', 70', 72'; Fitos 77'; Abdi 81'	Report	Antal 29'	Stadium: Üllői úti Stadion; Attendance: 3,000; Referee: Szabolcs Szilasi

22 September 2008 7	Vác	0–4	Ferencváros	Vác
19:00 CEST		Report	Ferenczi 55', 76'; Moussa 78'; Tóth 81'	Stadium: Városi Stadion; Attendance: 2,500; Referee: Sándor Andó-Szabó

28 September 2008 8	Ferencváros	3–1	ESMTK	Budapest
18:00 CEST	Kamaté 12'; Ferenczi 15'; Zsivóczky 40'	Report	Tarcsa 64'	Stadium: Üllői úti Stadion; Attendance: 5,000; Referee: Csaba Pintér

4 October 2008 9	Cegléd	1–1	Ferencváros	Cegléd
15:00 CEST	Horváth 37'	Report	Abdi 16'; Csiszár (red card) 70'	Stadium: Malomtó széli stadion Attendance: 2,000; Referee: Ádám Farkas

12 October 2008 10	Ferencváros	0–0	MTK Budapest II	Budapest
17:30 CEST		Report		Stadium: Üllői úti Stadion; Attendance: 3,000; Referee: Gergely Sulyok

18 October 2008 11	Kazincbarcika	1–1	Ferencváros	Kazincbarcika
14:30 CEST	Debreceni 60'	Report	Pölöskei 41'; Moussa (red card) 66'	Stadium: Pete András Stadion; Attendance: 3,000; Referee: Ferenc Bede

25 October 2008 12	Ferencváros	3–0	Baktalórántháza	Budapest
16:00 CEST	Morrison 27'; Tóth 42'; Pölöskei 64'	Report		Stadium: Üllői úti Stadion; Attendance: 2,500; Referee: Gábor Oláh

3 November 2008 13	Debrecen II	0–1	Ferencváros	Debrecen
19:00 CET		Report	Shaw 31'	Stadium: Oláh Gábor utcai Stadion; Attendance: 5,000; Referee: László Varga

9 November 2008 14	Ferencváros	3–2	Makó	Budapest
16:00 CET	Zsivóczky 13'; Szkukalek 29'; Dragóner 53'	Report	Maróti 24'; Varga 48'	Stadium: Üllői úti Stadion; Attendance: 2,500; Referee: Tamás Arany

15 November 2008 15	Vecsés	0–4	Ferencváros	Vecsés
13:30 CET		Report	Pölöskei 28'; Zsivóczky 45'; Dragóner 48'; Fülöp 86'	Stadium: Városi Sporttelep; Attendance: 3,000; Referee: József Berger

7 March 2009 16	Tököl	0–7	Ferencváros	Csepel
11:00 CET		Report	Dragóner 16', 41'; Shaw 30'; Ferenczi 34', 50', 58', 87'	Stadium: Béke téri Stadion; Attendance: 7,000; Referee: Gábor Kovács

14 March 2009 17	Ferencváros	4–1	Bőcs	Budapest
16:00 CET	Dragóner 6'; Fitos 10'; Ferenczi 27'; Wedgbury 44'	Report	Urbin 8'	Stadium: Üllői úti Stadion; Attendance: 12,000; Referee: István Mészáros

24 March 2009 18	Békéscsaba	0–1	Ferencváros	Békéscsaba
19:00 CET	Simon (red card) 90'	Report	Ferenczi 21'	Stadium: Kórház utcai Stadion; Attendance: 7,000; Referee: Mihály Fábián

28 March 2009 19	Ferencváros	2–1	BKV Előre	Budapest
15:00 CET	Shaw 45'; Robertson 88'	Report	Makrai 90'	Stadium: Üllői úti Stadion; Attendance: 6,000; Referee: Sándor Andó-Szabó

5 April 2009 20	Jászberény	0–1	Ferencváros	Vác
15:30 CEST		Report	Márkus 35'	Stadium: Ligeti Stadion; Attendance: 5,000; Referee: József Berger

11 April 2009 21	Szolnok	0–3	Ferencváros	Szolnok
14:00 CEST		Report	Robertson 36', 41'; Ferenczi 66'	Stadium: Tiszaligeti Stadion; Attendance: 6,000; Referee: Zsolt Szabó

18 April 2009 22	Ferencváros	6–1	Vác	Budapest
15:00 CEST	Ferenczi 7', 24', 44', 83'; Ashmore 74'; Shaw 79'	Report	Gáspár 58'; Varga (red card) 35'	Stadium: Üllői úti Stadion; Attendance: 6,000; Referee: Ferenc Bede

26 April 2009 23	ESMTK	0–3	Ferencváros	Csepel
17:00 CEST		Report	Ashmore 43', 69'; Zsivóczky 65'; Robertson (red card) 28'	Stadium: Béke téri Stadion; Attendance: 5,000; Referee: Gábor Oláh

18 April 2009 24	Ferencváros	4–1	Cegléd	Budapest
15:00 CEST	Ferenczi 33', 57', 76'; Balog 48'	Report	Medgyesi 60'	Stadium: Üllői úti Stadion; Attendance: 4,500; Referee: Gergő Király

10 May 2009 25	MTK Budapest II	1–2	Ferencváros	Csepel
17:30 CEST	Eppel 49'	Report	Shaw 13'; Ferenczi 70'	Stadium: Béke téri Stadion; Attendance: 4,000; Referee: Gábor Kovács

16 May 2009 26	Ferencváros	5–0	Kazincbarcika	Budapest
15:00 CEST	Ferenczi 8', 35', 48', 51'; Tóth 11'	Report		Stadium: Üllői úti Stadion; Attendance: on closed Referee: Ádám Farkas

23 May 2009 27	Baktalórántháza	2–3	Ferencváros	Baktalórántháza
16:00 CEST	Marics 39'; Tolnai 64'	Report	Fitos 10'; Ferenczi 30'; Lipcsei 68'	Stadium: Városi Stadion; Attendance: 1,000; Referee: László Varga

1 June 2009 28	Ferencváros	3–1	Debrecen II	Budapest
18:00 CEST	Ferenczi 38', 50'; Kamaté 86'	Report	Galvao 36'	Stadium: Üllői úti Stadion; Attendance: 5,000; Referee: Ferenc Bede

6 June 2009 29	Makó	2–1	Ferencváros	Makó
16:00 CEST	Maróti 24', 41'; Gévay (red card) 77'	Report	Fülöp 30'	Stadium: Erdei Ferenc téri Sporttelep; Attendance: 2,200; Referee: Gergely Sulyok

13 June 2009 30	Ferencváros	5–1	Vecsés	Budapest
17:00 CEST	Ferenczi 4', 72', 82'; Deme 71'; Szkukalek 74'	Report	Namquita 61'	Stadium: Üllői úti Stadion; Attendance: 3,500; Referee: József Erdős

=== Magyar Kupa ===
28 August 2008 Round of 128	Leányfalu	0–9	Ferencváros	Budapest
CEST		Report	Abdi 7', 41'; Kourouma 15'; Moussa 19'; Kamaté 29', 31', 50'; Bartha 64'; Diaz 85'	Stadium: Illovszky Rudolf Stadion; Attendance: 3,000; Referee: Dániel Becséri

3 September 2008 Round of 64	Szigetszentmiklós	1–1 (a.e.t.) (2–3 p)	Ferencváros	Szigetszentmiklós
CEST	Patakfalvi 64'	Report	Abdi 30'	Stadium: Sport utcai Stadion; Attendance: 1,800; Referee: László Varga

25 September 2008 Round of 32	Ferencváros	1–2	Szombathelyi Haladás	Budapest
18:00 CEST	Ferenczi 66'	Report	Kenesei 11'; Guzmics 19'	Stadium: Üllői úti Stadion; Attendance: 7,000; Referee: Zsolt Szabó

=== Ligakupa ===
==== Group stage ====
Pos	Team	Pld	W	D	L	GF	GA	GD	Pts	Qualification	FEH	HON	FER	KEC	RAK	BAK
1	Fehérvár	10	7	3	0	29	9	+20	24	Advance to knockout phase	—	2–2	0–0	2–0	4–0	8–0
2	Honvéd	10	5	4	1	33	16	+17	19	Advance to knockout phase	1–1	—	2–2	5–3	8–1	5–1
3	Ferencváros	10	5	4	1	20	10	+10	19		2–3	2–2	—	2–1	3–0	3–0
4	Kecskemét	10	3	2	5	22	17	+5	11		2–3	2–3	0–0	—	2–2	4–0
5	Rákospalota	10	3	1	6	14	28	−14	10		2–4	1–0	2–3	0–3	—	4–1
6	Baktalórántháza	10	0	0	10	3	41	−38	0		0–2	1–5	0–3	0–5	0–2	—

Source: HFF

1 October 2008 1	Baktalórántháza	0–3	Ferencváros	Baktalórántháza
15:30 CEST (UTC+2)		Report	Szalai 19'; Kourouma 50'; Bartholomew 85'	Stadium: Városi Sportpálya; Attendance: 500; Referee: Zoltán Iványi

15 October 2008 2	Budapest Honvéd	2–2	Ferencváros	Budapest
17:30 CEST (UTC+2)	Angoua (yellow card) 7'; Hercegfalvi 24'; Ivancsics (yellow card) 87'; Moreira 90+2'	Report	Downing 18'; Bartholomew 74'	Stadium: Bozsik Stadion; Attendance: 1,000; Referee: Tamás Arany

29 October 2008 3	Fehérvár	0–0	Ferencváros	Székesfehérvár
19:00 CET (UTC+1)		Report		Stadium: Sóstói Stadion; Attendance: 1,500; Referee: Ádám Németh

5 November 2008 4	Ferencváros	2–1	Kecskemét	Budapest
18:00 CET (UTC+1)	Pisanjuk 13'; Brettschneider 70'	Report	Nagy 3'	Stadium: Üllői úti stadion Attendance: 400; Referee: Mihály Fábián

12 November 2008 5	Rákospalota	2–3	Ferencváros	Budapest
18:00 CET (UTC+1)	Sallai 28'; Kapcsos 81'	Report	Kamaté 16'; Pisanjuk 42'; Brettschneider 49'	Stadium: Budai II. László Stadion; Attendance: 500; Referee: István Mészáros

22 November 2008 6	Ferencváros	3–0	Baktalórántháza	Budapest
13:00 CET (UTC+1)	Brettschneider 16'; Baranyai 49'; Fülöp 76'	Report		Stadium: Üllői úti stadion Attendance: 300; Referee: Krisztián Pánczél

30 November 2008 7	Ferencváros	2–2	Budapest Honvéd	Budapest
17:30 CET (UTC+1)	Deme 24'; Országh (yellow card) 36'; Kamaté 59', (yellow card) 69'	Report	Moreira 6'; Diego 33'; Takács (red card) 65'	Stadium: Üllői úti stadion Attendance: 500; Referee: Zsolt Szabó

6 December 2008 8	Ferencváros	2–3	Fehérvár	Budapest
12:00 CET (UTC+1)	Bartha (yellow card) 37'; Nyilasi 75'; Tóth 79'	Report	Anđić (red card) 11'; Nagy 16', 43'; Horváth 34', (yellow card) 75'; Radović (yellow card) 45'; Filipović (yellow card) 76'	Stadium: Üllői úti stadion Attendance: 300; Referee: Szabolcs Szilasi

8 February 2009 9	Kecskemét	0–0	Ferencváros	Kecskemét
17:30 CET (UTC+1)		Report		Stadium: Széktói Stadion; Attendance: 1,300; Referee: Ferenc Bede

15 February 2009 10	Ferencváros	3–0	Rákospalota	Budapest
17:30 CET (UTC+1)	Dragóner 18'; Kamaté 60'; Tóth 89'	Report		Stadium: Üllői úti stadion Attendance: 600; Referee: Roland Veizer

== Statistics ==
=== Appearances and goals ===
Last updated on 13 June 2009.

No.	Pos	Nat	Player	Total		Nemzeti Bajnokság II		Magyar Kupa		Ligakupa	
No.	Pos	Nat	Player	Apps	Goals	Apps	Goals	Apps	Goals	Apps	Goals
5	DF	(Slovakia) SVK	Igor Szkukalek	18	2	17	2	1	0	0	0
6	MF	(Hungary) HUN	Péter Lipcsei	11	1	11	1	0	0	0	0
7	MF	(Norway) NOR	Liban Abdi	10	5	7	2	2	3	1	0
8	MF	(England) ENG	James Ashmore	20	4	17	4	0	0	3	0
9	FW	(Hungary) HUN	Tibor Márkus	2	1	1	1	0	0	1	0
10	FW	(England) ENG	Paul Shaw	27	12	24	12	1	0	2	0
11	MF	(Jamaica) JAM	Wolry Wolfe	5	0	5	0	0	0	0	0
13	FW	(Hungary) HUN	István Ferenczi	27	40	24	39	1	1	2	0
14	DF	(England) ENG	Matthew Lowton	13	0	11	0	0	0	2	0
16	GK	(Hungary) HUN	Ádám Holczer	27	-19	19	-14	1	-1	7	-4
17	MF	(England) ENG	Sam Wedgbury	13	1	11	1	0	0	2	0
18	GK	(Trinidad and Tobago) TTO	Jan-Michael Williams	12	-7	9	-5	2	-2	1	-0
19	DF	(Hungary) HUN	Tibor Baranyai	13	1	3	0	2	0	8	1
21	MF	(Hungary) HUN	Norbert Zsivóczky	19	4	16	4	2	0	1	0
22	MF	(Ivory Coast) CIV	Sékou Tidiane	5	0	2	0	2	0	1	0
23	MF	(Hungary) HUN	Imre Deme	14	2	4	1	0	0	10	1
25	MF	(Jamaica) JAM	Jason Morrison	24	1	19	1	3	0	2	0
26	DF	(Hungary) HUN	Attila Dragóner	23	7	20	6	1	0	2	1
28	FW	(Hungary) HUN	István Kovács	1	0	1	0	0	0	0	0
29	DF	(Hungary) HUN	Noel Fülöp	19	3	12	2	2	0	5	1
30	MF	(Hungary) HUN	Bence Tóth	29	6	24	4	1	0	4	2
36	FW	(Canada) CAN	Igor Pisanjuk	7	2	3	0	0	0	4	2
38	MF	(Ivory Coast) CIV	Bamba Moussa	16	2	10	1	2	1	4	0
39	DF	(Jamaica) JAM	Rafe Wolfe	25	0	20	0	0	0	5	0
40	FW	(Ivory Coast) CIV	Dramane Kamaté	21	8	11	2	3	3	7	3
42	GK	(Hungary) HUN	Balázs Megyeri	9	-9	2	-3	0	-0	7	-6
51	MF	(Hungary) HUN	Máté Vass	2	0	2	0	0	0	0	0
60	FW	(Hungary) HUN	Péter Pölöskei	19	3	12	3	1	0	6	0
78	DF	(Hungary) HUN	Zoltán Balog	16	1	12	1	0	0	4	0
79	MF	(Guinea) GUI	Lamine Kourouma	17	2	12	0	2	1	3	1
82	DF	(Hungary) HUN	Zoltán Csiszár	21	0	19	0	1	0	1	0
87	MF	(Hungary) HUN	László Fitos	27	3	22	3	1	0	4	0
92	FW	(England) ENG	Jordan Robertson	8	3	8	3	0	0	0	0
Youth players:
1	GK	(Hungary) HUN	Péter Szappanos	0	0	0	-0	0	-0	0	-0
3	DF	(England) ENG	Craig Short	2	0	0	0	0	0	2	0
4	DF	(Hungary) HUN	Dániel Sváb	8	0	0	0	0	0	8	0
17	FW	(Hungary) HUN	Ádám Heitler	2	0	0	0	0	0	2	0
24	FW	(Hungary) HUN	Bálint Nyilasi	3	1	0	0	0	0	3	1
27	FW	(Hungary) HUN	Zsolt Kutasi	1	0	0	0	0	0	1	0
33	DF	(Hungary) HUN	Balázs Vattai	3	0	0	0	0	0	3	0
37	DF	(Hungary) HUN	Péter Országh	2	0	0	0	0	0	2	0
69	GK	(Hungary) HUN	Bence Hermány	0	0	0	-0	0	-0	0	-0
77	MF	(Hungary) HUN	Krisztián Kiss	0	0	0	0	0	0	0	0
90	GK	(Hungary) HUN	Balázs Pintér	0	0	0	-0	0	-0	0	-0
Out to loan:
31	MF	(United States) USA	Carlos Diaz	5	1	0	0	2	1	3	0
88	MF	(Hungary) HUN	Dávid Kulcsár	9	0	2	0	1	0	6	0
Players no longer at the club:
9	FW	(Trinidad and Tobago) TTO	Matthew Bartholomew	4	2	0	0	2	0	2	2
11	FW	(Trinidad and Tobago) TTO	Aaron Downing	5	1	1	0	2	0	2	1
14	MF	(Hungary) HUN	Tamás Szalai	4	1	0	0	0	0	4	1
15	FW	(Hungary) HUN	László Bartha	11	1	5	0	3	1	3	0
20	MF	(Hungary) HUN	László Brettschneider	6	3	0	0	0	0	6	3

=== Top scorers ===
Includes all competitive matches. The list is sorted by shirt number when total goals are equal.

Last updated on 13 June 2009

Position	Nation	Number	Name	Nemzeti Bajnokság II	Magyar Kupa	Ligakupa	Total
1	(Hungary)	13	István Ferenczi	39	1	0	40
2	(England)	10	Paul Shaw	12	0	0	12
3	(Ivory Coast)	40	Dramane Kamaté	2	3	3	8
4	(Hungary)	26	Attila Dragóner	6	0	1	7
5	(Hungary)	30	Bence Tóth	4	0	2	6
6	(Norway)	7	Liban Abdi	2	3	0	5
7	(Hungary)	21	Norbert Zsivóczky	4	0	0	4
8	(England)	26	James Ashmore	4	0	0	4
9	(Hungary)	60	Péter Pölöskei	3	0	0	3
10	(England)	92	Jordan Robertson	3	0	0	3
11	(Hungary)	87	László Fitos	3	0	0	3
12	(Hungary)	29	Noel Fülöp	2	0	1	3
13	(Hungary)	20	László Brettschneider	0	0	3	3
14	(Slovakia)	5	Igor Szkukalek	2	0	0	2
15	(Ivory Coast)	38	Bamba Moussa	1	1	0	2
16	(Hungary)	23	Imre Deme	1	0	1	2
17	(Guinea)	79	Lamine Kourouma	0	1	1	2
18	(Trinidad and Tobago)	9	Matthew Bartholomew	0	0	2	2
19	(Canada)	36	Igor Pisanjuk	0	0	2	2
20	(Jamaica)	25	Jason Morrison	1	0	0	1
21	(England)	17	Sam Wedgbury	1	0	0	1
22	(Hungary)	9	Tibor Márkus	1	0	0	1
23	(Hungary)	78	Zoltán Balog	1	0	0	1
24	(Hungary)	6	Péter Lipcsei	1	0	0	1
25	(Hungary)	15	László Bartha	0	1	0	1
26	(United States)	31	Carlos Diaz	0	1	0	1
27	(Hungary)	14	Tamás Szalai	0	0	1	1
28	(Trinidad and Tobago)	11	Aaron Downing	0	0	1	1
29	(Hungary)	19	Tibor Baranyai	0	0	1	1
30	(Hungary)	24	Bálint Nyilasi	0	0	1	1
/	/	/	Own Goals	1	0	0	1
			TOTALS	94	11	20	125

=== Disciplinary record ===
Includes all competitive matches. Players with 1 card or more included only.

Last updated on 13 June 2009

Position	Nation	Number	Name	Nemzeti Bajnokság II		Magyar Kupa		Ligakupa		Total (Hu Total)	
Position	Nation	Number	Name	Yellow card	Red card	Yellow card	Red card	Yellow card	Red card	Yellow card	Red card
DF	(Hungary)	4	Dániel Sváb	0	0	0	0	1	0	1 (0)	0 (0)
DF	(Slovakia)	5	Igor Szkukalek	3	0	0	0	0	0	3 (3)	0 (0)
MF	(Norway)	7	Liban Abdi	1	0	0	0	0	0	1 (1)	0 (0)
FW	(England)	10	Paul Shaw	2	0	0	0	0	0	2 (2)	0 (0)
FW	(Hungary)	13	István Ferenczi	1	0	0	0	0	0	1 (1)	0 (0)
DF	(England)	14	Matthew Lowton	3	0	0	0	2	0	5 (3)	0 (0)
MF	(Hungary)	15	László Bartha	0	0	0	0	1	0	1 (0)	0 (0)
MF	(England)	17	Sam Wedgbury	2	0	0	0	0	0	2 (2)	0 (0)
MF	(Hungary)	21	Norbert Zsivóczky	1	0	0	0	0	0	1 (1)	0 (0)
MF	(Ivory Coast)	22	Sékou Tidiane	1	0	0	0	0	0	1 (1)	0 (0)
MF	(Jamaica)	25	Jason Morrison	2	0	0	0	0	0	2 (2)	0 (0)
DF	(Hungary)	26	Attila Dragóner	3	0	1	0	0	0	4 (3)	0 (0)
DF	(Hungary)	29	Noel Fülöp	2	0	1	0	0	0	3 (2)	0 (0)
MF	(Hungary)	30	Bence Tóth	6	0	1	0	0	0	7 (6)	0 (0)
MF	(United States)	31	Carlos Diaz	0	0	0	0	1	0	1 (0)	0 (0)
FW	(Canada)	36	Igor Pisanjuk	1	0	0	0	1	0	2 (1)	0 (0)
DF	(Hungary)	37	Péter Országh	0	0	0	0	1	0	1 (0)	0 (0)
MF	(Ivory Coast)	38	Bamba Moussa	0	1	0	0	1	0	1 (0)	1 (1)
DF	(Jamaica)	39	Rafe Wolfe	4	0	0	0	1	0	5 (4)	0 (0)
FW	(Ivory Coast)	40	Dramane Kamaté	1	0	0	0	1	0	2 (1)	0 (0)
FW	(Hungary)	60	Péter Pölöskei	1	0	0	0	1	0	2 (1)	0 (0)
DF	(Hungary)	78	Zoltán Balog	1	0	0	0	0	0	1 (1)	0 (0)
MF	(Guinea)	79	Lamine Kourouma	1	0	0	0	1	0	2 (1)	0 (0)
DF	(Hungary)	82	Zoltán Csiszár	1	1	0	0	0	0	1 (1)	1 (1)
MF	(Hungary)	87	László Fitos	2	0	0	0	0	0	2 (2)	0 (0)
FW	(England)	92	Jordan Robertson	3	1	0	0	0	0	3 (3)	1 (1)
			TOTALS	42	3	3	0	12	0	57 (42)	3 (3)

=== Clean sheets ===
Last updated on 13 June 2009

Position	Nation	Number	Name	Nemzeti Bajnokság II	Magyar Kupa	Ligakupa	Total
1	(Hungary)	16	Ádám Holczer	8	0	5	13
2	(Trinidad and Tobago)	18	Jan-Michael Williams	5	1	1	7
3	(Hungary)	42	Balázs Megyeri	0	0	3	3
4	(Hungary)	1	Péter Szappanos	0	0	0	0
5	(Hungary)	90	Balázs Pintér	0	0	0	0
6	(Hungary)	69	Bence Hermány	0	0	0	0
			TOTALS	13	1	9	23
