= 2007–08 Ferencvárosi TC season =

Ferencvárosi TC
2007–08 season
- Chairman: Krisztián Berki
- Manager: János Csank (until 16 April 2008); Bobby Davidson
- Stadium: Üllői úti stadion
- NB 2 (east): 3rd
- Hungarian Cup: Round of 16
- Top goalscorer: League: Edouard Ndjodo (14); All: Edouard Ndjodo (15)
- Highest home attendance: 13,000 vs Kazincbarcika (8 March 2008)
- Lowest home attendance: 300 vs Paks (28 August 2007)

The 2007–08 season will be Ferencvárosi TC's 2nd competitive season, 2nd consecutive season in the Nemzeti Bajnokság II and 108th year in existence as a football club.

== Squad ==
As of match played 21 July 2008

No.	Name	Nationality	Position	Date of birth (age)	Signed from	Signed in	Apps.	Goals
Goalkeepers
1	Balázs Pintér	(Hungary)	GK	12 February 1990 (aged 18)	youth sector	2007	0	0
16	Ádám Holczer	(Hungary)	GK	28 March 1988 (aged 20)	youth sector	2008	6	0
99	Wojciech Zarzycki	(Poland)	GK	21 June 1982 (aged 25)	Miedź Legnica	2007	2	0
Defenders
5	Sándor Nagy	(Hungary)	DF	1 January 1988 (aged 20)	youth sector	2006	22	1
11	József Megyesi	(Hungary)	DF	13 May 1987 (aged 21)	youth sector	2006	2	0
17	János Mátyus	(Hungary)	DF	20 December 1974 (aged 33)	Győr	2007	64	12
18	Milán Rédei	(Hungary)	DF	30 August 1988 (aged 19)	youth sector	2007	5	0
19	Tibor Baranyai	(Hungary)	DF	29 April 1978 (aged 30)	Videoton	2008	9	0
26	Attila Dragóner	(Hungary)	DF	15 November 1974 (aged 33)	Vitória Guimarães	2006	198	24
29	Noel Fülöp	(Hungary)	DF	29 January 1988 (aged 20)	youth sector	2006	9	0
50	Zoltán Vasas	(Hungary)	DF	5 November 1977 (aged 30)	Sligo Rovers	2007	16	0
82	Zoltán Csiszár	(Hungary)	DF	7 July 1982 (aged 25)	Orosháza	2008	8	0
Midfielders
4	Bence Tóth	(Hungary)	MF	22 July 1989 (aged 18)	youth sector	2008	4	0
6	Péter Lipcsei	(Hungary)	MF	28 March 1972 (aged 36)	Austria Salzburg	2000	392	101
8	Bojan Lazić	(Serbia)	MF	13 May 1974 (aged 34)	Sopron	2005	55	0
9	Krisztián Lisztes	(Hungary)	MF	2 July 1976 (aged 31)	Hajduk Split	2008	91	19
12	Krisztián Kiss	(Hungary)	MF	26 December 1990 (aged 17)	youth sector	2008	1	0
13	Ottó Vincze	(Hungary)	MF	29 August 1974 (aged 33)	Győr	2007	95	23
14	Tamás Szalai	(Hungary)	MF	12 June 1984 (aged 24)	youth sector	2003	38	2
20	László Brettschneider	(Hungary)	MF	22 January 1985 (aged 23)	youth sector	2005	18	3
21	Norbert Zsivóczky	(Hungary)	MF	16 February 1988 (aged 20)	youth sector	2006	16	1
22	Sékou Tidiane	(Ivory Coast)	MF	9 April 1983 (aged 25)	Sheffield United	2008	10	0
23	Imre Deme	(Hungary)	MF	3 August 1983 (aged 24)	Tatabánya	2006	43	1
38	Bamba Moussa	(Ivory Coast)	MF	6 January 1985 (aged 23)	Sheffield United	2008	8	0
79	Lamine Kourouma	(Guinea)	MF	1 January 1987 (aged 21)	Sheffield United	2008	6	2
87	László Fitos	(Hungary)	MF	27 February 1987 (aged 21)	youth sector	2005	51	2
88	Dávid Kulcsár	(Hungary)	MF	25 February 1988 (aged 20)	youth sector	2006	20	2
Forwards
3	Zsolt Kutasi	(Hungary)	FW	15 January 1989 (aged 19)	youth sector	2008	1	0
7	Edouard Ndjodo	(Cameroon)	FW	25 September 1985 (aged 22)	Budapest Honvéd	2007	25	14
10	Paul Shaw	(England)	FW	4 September 1973 (aged 34)	Oxford United	2008	14	8
11	Bálint Nyilasi	(Hungary)	FW	20 March 1990 (aged 18)	youth sector	2008	0	0
15	László Bartha	(Hungary)	FW	9 February 1987 (aged 21)	youth sector	2005	73	13
36	Igor Pisanjuk	(Canada)	FW	24 October 1989 (aged 18)	youth sector	2008	3	0
40	Dramane Kamaté	(Ivory Coast)	FW	31 August 1985 (aged 22)	Sheffield United	2008	1	0
Players away on loan
4	József Nagy	(Hungary)	DF	1 January 1988 (aged 20)	youth sector	2006	13	0
Players who left during the season
9	Péter Horváth	(Hungary)	FW	25 November 1970 (aged 37)	Jászapáti	2007	89	43
22	Zoltán Jovánczai	(Hungary)	FW	8 December 1984 (aged 23)	Kaposvár	2005	43	15
35	Kálmán Szabó	(Hungary)	GK	27 July 1980 (aged 27)	youth sector	2006	3	0
66	Bence Somodi	(Hungary)	GK	25 November 1988 (aged 19)	Blackburn Rovers	2007	0	0

== Transfers ==
=== Summer ===
In: Note: Flags indicate national team as defined under FIFA eligibility rules; some limited exceptions apply. Players may hold more than one non-FIFA nationality.

No.	Pos.	Nation	Player
7	FW	CMR	Edouard Ndjodo (loan from Budapest Honvéd)
9	FW	HUN	Péter Horváth (from Jászapáti)
13	MF	HUN	Ottó Vincze (from Győr)
17	DF	HUN	János Mátyus (from Győr)
18	DF	HUN	Milán Rédei (from youth sector)
50	DF	HUN	Zoltán Vasas (from (Republic of Ireland) Sligo Rovers)
66	GK	HUN	Bence Somodi (from (England) Blackburn Rovers)
99	GK	POL	Wojciech Zarzycki (from (Poland) Miedź Legnica)

Out: Note: Flags indicate national team as defined under FIFA eligibility rules; some limited exceptions apply. Players may hold more than one non-FIFA nationality.

No.	Pos.	Nation	Player
7	FW	HUN	Dávid Horváth (loan to Mosonmagyaróvár)
13	DF	HUN	Noel Fülöp (loan to Mosonmagyaróvár)
14	MF	HUN	Tamás Szalai (loan to Mosonmagyaróvár)
17	DF	HUN	Dániel Ferencz (loan to Soroksár)
18	MF	HUN	Zsolt Laczkó (to (Greece) Olympiacos)
27	MF	HUN	Richárd Csepregi (loan to Soroksár)
28	DF	HUN	Zsolt Bognár (to (Italy) Frosinone)
55	FW	HUN	Attila Tököli (to Paks)
59	GK	HUN	Szabolcs Kemenes (to (Cyprus) Ethnikos Achna)
70	GK	HUN	László Komora (loan to Soroksár)
78	DF	HUN	Zoltán Balog (to (Denmark) Viborg)

=== Winter ===
In: Note: Flags indicate national team as defined under FIFA eligibility rules; some limited exceptions apply. Players may hold more than one non-FIFA nationality.

No.	Pos.	Nation	Player
9	MF	HUN	Krisztián Lisztes (from (Croatia) Hajduk Split)
10	FW	ENG	Paul Shaw (from (England) Sheffield United)
14	MF	HUN	Tamás Szalai (loan return from Mosonmagyaróvár)
16	GK	HUN	Ádám Holczer (loan return from Vecsés)
19	DF	HUN	Tibor Baranyai (loan from Fehérvár)
22	MF	CIV	Sékou Tidiane (from (China) Chengdu Tiancheng)
38	MF	CIV	Bamba Moussa (from (China) Shenzhen)
40	FW	CIV	Dramane Kamaté (from (China) Chengdu Tiancheng)
79	MF	GUI	Kourouma Mohamed Lamine (from (China) Chengdu Tiancheng)
82	DF	HUN	Zoltán Csiszár (from Orosháza)
—	DF	SVK	Igor Szkukalek (from (Slovakia) Trenčín)

Out: Note: Flags indicate national team as defined under FIFA eligibility rules; some limited exceptions apply. Players may hold more than one non-FIFA nationality.

No.	Pos.	Nation	Player
1	GK	HUN	Milán Udvarácz (to Pécs)
4	DF	HUN	József Nagy (loan to Kozármisleny)
7	FW	CMR	Edouard Ndjodo (loan return to Budapest Honvéd)
9	FW	HUN	Péter Horváth (Retired)
42	FW	HUN	Zoltán Jovánczai (to Vasas)
66	GK	HUN	Bence Somodi (to Vecsés)

== Competitions ==
=== Overview ===
Competition	First match	Last match	Starting round	Final position	Record							
Competition	First match	Last match	Starting round	Final position	Pld	W	D	L	GF	GA	GD	Win %
Nemzeti Bajnokság II	11 August 2007	1 June 2008	Matchday 1	Third place	30	18	8	4	63	35	+28	60.00
Hungarian Cup	23 August 2007	7 November 2007	Round of 128	Round of 16	5	2	2	1	10	4	+6	40.00
Total					35	20	10	5	73	39	+34	57.14

Last updated: 1 June 2008
Source: Competitions

=== Nemzeti Bajnokság II ===
==== League table ====
Pos	Team	Pld	W	D	L	GF	GA	GD	Pts	Promotion or relegation
1	Kecskemét (P)	30	24	3	3	74	23	+51	75	Promotion to Nemzeti Bajnokság I
2	Szolnok	30	20	3	7	52	29	+23	63	
3	Ferencváros	30	18	8	4	65	35	+30	62	
4	Makó	30	13	11	6	52	34	+18	50	
5	Vác	30	13	6	11	57	45	+12	45	

Source: Hungarian Football Federation (in Hungarian), Soccerway
Rules for classification: 1) Points; 2) Matches won; 3) Goal difference; 4) Goals scored; 5) Head-to-head points; 6) Head-to-head goal difference; 7) Head-to-head away goals scored; 8) Fair play ranking; 9) Drawing of lots.
(P) Promoted

==== Results summary ====
Overall								Home						Away					
Pld	W	D	L	GF	GA	GD	Pts	W	D	L	GF	GA	GD	W	D	L	GF	GA	GD
30	18	8	4	63	35	+28	62	9	4	2	28	12	+16	9	4	2	35	23	+12

Last updated: 1 June 2008.
Source: Soccerway

==== Results by round ====
Round	1	2	3	4	5	6	7	8	9	10	11	12	13	14	15	16	17	18	19	20	21	22	23	24	25	26	27	28	29	30
Ground	H	A	H	A	H	A	H	A	H	A	H	A	H	A	H	A	H	A	H	A	H	A	H	A	H	A	H	A	H	A
Result	W	D	D	W	L	D	D	D	W	L	W	W	W	W	W	W	W	W	W	L	D	D	W	W	L	W	D	W	W	W
Position	1	5	5	5	6	7	9	10	4	7	5	5	4	3	3	3	3	3	3	3	3	3	3	3	3	3	3	3	3	3

Updated to match(es) played on 1 June 2008. Source: Matches
A = Away; H = Home; W = Win; D = Draw; L = Loss

==== Matches ====
11 August 2007 1	Ferencváros	2–0	BKV Előre	Budapest
19:00 CEST	Lipcsei 90+1'; Ndjodo 90+4'	Report		Stadium: Üllői úti Stadion; Attendance: 8,000; Referee: Tamás Bognár

18 August 2007 2	Kazincbarcika	2–2	Ferencváros	Kazincbarcika
17:30 CEST	Elek 57'; Deák 68'	Report	Lipcsei 22'; Horváth 65'	Stadium: Pete András Stadion; Attendance: 3,500; Referee: Péter Solymosi

25 August 2007 3	Ferencváros	2–2	Vecsés	Budapest
19:00 CEST	Ndjodo 25'; Dragóner 33'	Report	Lukács 31'; Czipper 58'	Stadium: Üllői úti Stadion; Attendance: 5,000; Referee: Krisztián Pánczél

1 September 2007 4	Vác	0–2	Ferencváros	Vác
16:30 CEST		Report	Mátyus 29'; Lipcsei 82'	Stadium: Városi Stadion; Attendance: 3,500; Referee: Zoltán Iványi

8 September 2007 5	Ferencváros	1–2	Szolnok	Budapest
20:30 CEST	Mátyus 58'	Report	Bogdán 41'; Remili 43'	Stadium: Üllői úti Stadion; Attendance: 3,500; Referee: Norbert Kiss

15 September 2007 6	Orosháza	3–3	Ferencváros	Orosháza
16:30 CEST	Petneházi 42'; Buza 56'; Szeverényi 89'	Report	Mátyus 38'; Ndjodo 43', 80'	Stadium: Mátrai Sándor Stadion; Attendance: 3,000; Referee: Tamás Arany

22 September 2007 7	Ferencváros	1–1	Makó	Budapest
17:30 CEST	Ndjodo 45'	Report	Gévay 4'	Stadium: Üllői úti Stadion; Attendance: 3,500; Referee: Róbert Nagy

30 September 2007 8	Bőcs	3–3	Ferencváros	Miskolc
16:00 CEST	Urbin 43', 49'; Török 84'	Report	Ndjodo 42', 55' (red card) 90+2'; Zsivóczky 61'	Stadium: DVTK Stadion; Attendance: 1,500; Referee: Csaba Sápi

6 October 2007 9	Ferencváros	3–0	Mezőkövesd	Budapest
16:30 CEST	Deme 25'; Vincze 68'; Bartha 83'	Report	D. Olasz (red card) 63'	Stadium: Üllői úti Stadion; Attendance: 2,500; Referee: Ádám Németh

13 October 2007 10	Kecskemét	4–0	Ferencváros	Kecskemét
13:00 CEST	Kormos 27'; Yannick 45', 63'; Kopunović 78'	Report	Vincze (red card) 62'	Stadium: Széktói Stadion; Attendance: 4,000; Referee: Ferenc Bede

20 October 2007 11	Ferencváros	2–0	Tuzsér	Budapest
18:00 CEST	Ndjodo 14'; Dragóner	Report		Stadium: Üllői úti Stadion; Attendance: 3,000; Referee: Krisztián Király

27 October 2007 12	Tököl	0–4	Ferencváros	Tököl
13:00 CET		Report	Brettschneider 11', 26'; Lipcsei 33'; Horváth 51'	Stadium: Sport utcai Sporttelep; Attendance: 3,000; Referee: Zoltán Iványi

3 November 2007 13	Ferencváros	1–0	Jászberény	Budapest
15:00 CET	Brettschneider 58'	Report		Stadium: Üllői úti Stadion; Attendance: 4,000; Referee: Gábor Oláh

10 November 2007 14	Cegléd	0–1	Ferencváros	Cegléd
13:30 CET		Report	Ndjodo 3'	Stadium: Malomtó széli stadion Attendance: 3,000; Referee: Zsolt Szabó

19 November 2007 15	Ferencváros	2–0	Baktalórántháza	Budapest
18:00 CET	Lipcsei 23'; Kulcsár 71'	Report		Stadium: Üllői úti Stadion; Attendance: 3,000; Referee: Gergely Sulyok

2 March 2008 16	BKV Előre	3–4	Ferencváros	Cegléd
14:30 CET	Hammer 3'; Páles 55'; Török 65'	Report	Ndjodo 31', 87'; Mátyus 70' (pen.); Bartha 82'; Fülöp (red card) 65'	Stadium: Sport utcai Stadion; Attendance: 1,500; Referee: Roland Veizer

8 March 2008 17	Ferencváros	4–0	Kazincbarcika	Budapest
18:00 CET	Dragóner 33'; Shaw 75', 81'; Bartha 88'	Report		Stadium: Üllői úti Stadion; Attendance: 13,000; Referee: Tamás Arany

15 March 2008 18	Vecsés	1–2	Ferencváros	Budapest
14:30 CET	Menyhárt 28'	Report	Lipcsei 13', 51'	Stadium: Budai II. László Stadion; Attendance: 5,300; Referee: Zoltán Iványi

21 March 2008 19	Ferencváros	1–0	Vác	Budapest
17:30 CET	Shaw 30'	Report		Stadium: Üllői úti Stadion; Attendance: 8,000; Referee: Tamás Bognár

30 March 2008 20	Szolnok	2–1	Ferencváros	Szolnok
13:00 CEST	Gohér 45'; Kiss 81'	Report	Ndjodo 76'	Stadium: Tiszaligeti Stadion; Attendance: 9,000; Referee: Ferenc Bede

5 April 2008 21	Ferencváros	2–2	Orosháza	Budapest
18:00 CEST	Shaw 7'; Lipcsei 45'; Holczer (red card) 69'	Report	Lupsa 21'; Lengyel 51'	Stadium: Üllői úti Stadion; Attendance: 4,500; Referee: Krisztián Király

13 April 2008 22	Makó	2–2	Ferencváros	Makó
15:00 CEST	Maróti 42'; Szamosszegi 90+2'	Report	Kulcsár 19'; Lipcsei 74'	Stadium: Erdei Ferenc téri Sporttelep; Attendance: 3,500; Referee: Mihály Fábián

19 April 2008 23	Ferencváros	1–0	Bőcs	Budapest
18:00 CEST	Ndjodo 37'	Report	Mező (red card) 90+1'	Stadium: Üllői úti Stadion; Attendance: 3,500; Referee: József Erdős

27 April 2008 24	Mezőkövesd	0–3	Ferencváros	Mezőkövesd
17:00 CEST	Ristić (yellow card) 43' (yellow-red card) 61'	Report	Toplenszki 72' (o.g.); Lipcsei 87', 90'	Stadium: Városi Stadion; Attendance: 3,000; Referee: Attila Hegedűs

1 May 2008 25	Ferencváros	1–2	Kecskemét	Budapest
18:00 CEST	Ndjodo 53'; Dragóner (red card) 90+1'	Report	Montvai 47', 73'	Stadium: Üllői úti Stadion; Attendance: 10,000; Referee: Viktor Kassai

4 May 2008 26	Tuzsér	2–3	Ferencváros	Tuzsér
13:30 CEST	Ur 37', 39'	Report	Fitos 16'; Szalai 53'; Mátyus 80'; Vasas (red card) 89'	Stadium: Lónyay Kastélykerti pálya Attendance: 1,200; Referee: Róbert Nagy

10 May 2008 27	Ferencváros	1–1	Tököl	Budapest
19:00 CEST	Shaw 90'	Report	Kurucsai 52'	Stadium: Üllői úti Stadion; Attendance: 3,500; Referee: Krisztián Király

18 May 2008 28	Jászberény	0–3	Ferencváros	Jászberény
12:45 CEST		Report	Vincze 10'; Lipcsei 44'; Dragóner 72'	Stadium: Városi Stadion; Attendance: 1,500; Referee: László Varga

24 May 2008 29	Ferencváros	4–2	Cegléd	Budapest
15:00 CEST	Shaw 31', 72'; Lamine 42'; Dragóner 83'	Report	Medgyesi 10'; Nagy 75'; Kiri (red card) 21'	Stadium: Üllői úti Stadion; Attendance: 2,000; Referee: Mihály Fábián

1 June 2008 30	Baktalórántháza	1–2	Ferencváros	Baktalórántháza
16:00 CEST	Saliga 36'; Bodnár (red card) 12'	Report	Lamine 63'; Shaw 90'	Stadium: Városi Stadion; Attendance: 2,000; Referee: Sándor Andó-Szabó

=== Hungarian Cup ===
23 August 2007 Round of 128	Törökbálint	0–6	Ferencváros	Budaörs
CEST		Report	Vincze 14', 16', 80'; Bábik 26' (o.g.); Zsivóczky 53'; Bartha 70'	Stadium: Városi Stadion; Attendance: 1,500; Referee: Gábor Kovács

28 August 2007 Round of 64	Ferencváros	0–0	Paks	Budapest
CEST		Report		Stadium: Üllői úti Stadion; Attendance: 300; Referee: Ferenc Bede

26 September 2007 Round of 32	Felcsút	0–1	Ferencváros	Székesfehérvár
CEST		Report	Ndjodo 34'	Stadium: Sóstói Stadion; Attendance: 1,200; Referee: Viktor Kassai

24 October 2007 Round of 16 (1st leg)	Ferencváros	2–2	Kaposvár	Budapest
CEST	Bartha 14'; Dragóner 62'	Report	Alves 39'; Zahorecz 45' (red card) 45'	Stadium: Üllői úti Stadion; Attendance: 2,000; Referee: Péter Solymosi

7 November 2007 Round of 16 (2nd leg)	Kaposvár	2–1 (4–3 agg.)	Ferencváros	Kaposvár
CEST	Oláh 30', 38'	Report	Fitos 48'; Dragóner (red card) 90'	Stadium: Rákóczi Stadion; Attendance: 3,000; Referee: Tamás Arany

== Statistics ==
=== Appearances and goals ===
Last updated on 1 June 2008.

No.	Pos	Nat	Player	Total		Nemzeti Bajnokság II		Hungarian Cup	
No.	Pos	Nat	Player	Apps	Goals	Apps	Goals	Apps	Goals
4	MF	(Hungary) HUN	Bence Tóth	4	0	4	0	0	0
5	DF	(Hungary) HUN	Sándor Nagy	18	0	14	0	4	0
6	MF	(Hungary) HUN	Péter Lipcsei	32	12	28	12	4	0
7	FW	(Cameroon) CMR	Edouard Ndjodo	30	15	25	14	5	1
8	MF	(Serbia) SRB	Bojan Lazić	23	0	18	0	5	0
9	MF	(Hungary) HUN	Krisztián Lisztes	11	0	11	0	0	0
10	FW	(England) ENG	Paul Shaw	14	8	14	8	0	0
11	DF	(Hungary) HUN	József Medgyesi	3	0	2	0	1	0
13	MF	(Hungary) HUN	Ottó Vincze	22	5	18	2	4	3
14	MF	(Hungary) HUN	Tamás Szalai	7	1	7	1	0	0
15	FW	(Hungary) HUN	László Bartha	30	5	25	3	5	2
16	GK	(Hungary) HUN	Ádám Holczer	6	-8	6	-8	0	-0
17	DF	(Hungary) HUN	János Mátyus	31	5	26	5	5	0
18	DF	(Hungary) HUN	Milán Rédei	8	0	5	0	3	0
19	DF	(Hungary) HUN	Tibor Baranyai	7	0	7	0	0	0
20	MF	(Hungary) HUN	László Brettschneider	6	3	4	3	2	0
21	MF	(Hungary) HUN	Norbert Zsivóczky	13	2	11	1	2	1
22	MF	(Ivory Coast) CIV	Sékou Tidiane	10	0	10	0	0	0
23	MF	(Hungary) HUN	Imre Deme	25	1	20	1	5	0
26	DF	(Hungary) HUN	Attila Dragóner	32	6	27	5	5	1
29	DF	(Hungary) HUN	Noel Fülöp	9	0	9	0	0	0
36	FW	(Canada) CAN	Igor Pisanjuk	3	0	3	0	0	0
38	MF	(Ivory Coast) CIV	Bamba Moussa	8	0	8	0	0	0
40	FW	(Ivory Coast) CIV	Dramane Kamaté	1	0	1	0	0	0
50	DF	(Hungary) HUN	Zoltán Vasas	19	0	16	0	3	0
79	MF	(Guinea) GUI	Mohamed Lamine	6	2	6	2	0	0
82	DF	(Hungary) HUN	Zoltán Csiszár	8	0	8	0	0	0
87	MF	(Hungary) HUN	László Fitos	28	2	24	1	4	1
88	MF	(Hungary) HUN	Dávid Kulcsár	19	2	15	2	4	0
99	GK	(Poland) POL	Wojciech Zarzycki	27	-29	24	-25	3	-4
Youth players:
1	GK	(Hungary) HUN	Balázs Pintér	0	0	0	-0	0	-0
3	FW	(Hungary) HUN	Zsolt Kutasi	1	0	1	0	0	0
11	FW	(Hungary) HUN	Bálint Nyilasi	0	0	0	0	0	0
12	MF	(Hungary) HUN	Krisztián Kiss	1	0	1	0	0	0
Out to loan:
4	DF	(Hungary) HUN	József Nagy	9	0	7	0	2	0
Players no longer at the club:
9	FW	(Hungary) HUN	Péter Horváth	13	2	11	2	2	0
22	FW	(Hungary) HUN	Zoltán Jovánczai	0	0	0	0	0	0
35	GK	(Hungary) HUN	Kálmán Szabó	3	-2	1	-2	2	-0
66	GK	(Hungary) HUN	Bence Somodi	0	0	0	-0	0	-0

=== Top scorers ===
Includes all competitive matches. The list is sorted by shirt number when total goals are equal.

Last updated on 1 June 2008

Position	Nation	Number	Name	Nemzeti Bajnokság II	Hungarian Cup	Total
1	(Cameroon)	7	Edouard Ndjodo	14	1	15
2	(Hungary)	6	Péter Lipcsei	12	0	12
3	(England)	10	Paul Shaw	8	0	8
4	(Hungary)	26	Attila Dragóner	5	1	6
5	(Hungary)	17	János Mátyus	5	0	5
6	(Hungary)	15	László Bartha	3	2	5
7	(Hungary)	13	Ottó Vincze	2	3	5
8	(Hungary)	20	László Brettschneider	3	0	3
9	(Hungary)	9	Péter Horváth	2	0	2
10	(Hungary)	88	Dávid Kulcsár	2	0	2
11	(Guinea)	79	Mohamed Lamine	2	0	2
12	(Hungary)	21	Norbert Zsivóczky	1	1	2
13	(Hungary)	87	László Fitos	1	1	2
14	(Hungary)	23	Imre Deme	1	0	1
15	(Hungary)	14	Tamás Szalai	1	0	1
/	/	/	Own Goals	1	1	2
			TOTALS	63	10	73

=== Disciplinary record ===
Includes all competitive matches. Players with 1 card or more included only.

Last updated on 1 June 2008

Position	Nation	Number	Name	Nemzeti Bajnokság II		Hungarian Cup		Total (Hu Total)	
Position	Nation	Number	Name	Yellow card	Red card	Yellow card	Red card	Yellow card	Red card
DF	(Hungary)	5	Sándor Nagy	2	0	1	0	3 (2)	0 (0)
MF	(Hungary)	6	Péter Lipcsei	3	0	1	0	4 (3)	0 (0)
FW	(Cameroon)	7	Edouard Ndjodo	3	1	0	0	3 (3)	1 (1)
MF	(Serbia)	8	Bojan Lazić	2	0	0	0	2 (2)	0 (0)
MF	(Hungary)	9	Krisztián Lisztes	2	0	0	0	2 (2)	0 (0)
MF	(Hungary)	13	Ottó Vincze	2	1	0	0	2 (2)	1 (1)
MF	(Hungary)	14	Tamás Szalai	1	0	0	0	1 (1)	0 (0)
FW	(Hungary)	15	László Bartha	3	0	0	0	3 (3)	0 (0)
GK	(Hungary)	16	Ádám Holczer	0	1	0	0	0 (0)	1 (1)
DF	(Hungary)	17	János Mátyus	3	0	1	0	4 (3)	0 (0)
DF	(Hungary)	18	Milán Rédei	0	0	1	0	1 (0)	0 (0)
MF	(Ivory Coast)	22	Sékou Tidiane	1	0	0	0	1 (1)	0 (0)
MF	(Hungary)	23	Imre Deme	4	0	2	0	6 (4)	0 (0)
DF	(Hungary)	26	Attila Dragóner	4	1	1	1	5 (4)	2 (1)
DF	(Hungary)	29	Noel Fülöp	1	1	0	0	1 (1)	1 (1)
MF	(Ivory Coast)	38	Bamba Moussa	2	0	0	0	2 (2)	0 (0)
DF	(Hungary)	50	Zoltán Vasas	3	1	1	0	4 (3)	1 (1)
MF	(Guinea)	79	Mohamed Lamine	2	0	0	0	2 (2)	0 (0)
DF	(Hungary)	82	Zoltán Csiszár	2	0	0	0	2 (2)	0 (0)
MF	(Hungary)	87	László Fitos	0	0	1	0	1 (0)	0 (0)
MF	(Hungary)	88	Dávid Kulcsár	3	0	0	0	3 (3)	0 (0)
			TOTALS	43	6	9	1	52 (43)	7 (6)

=== Clean sheets ===
Last updated on 1 June 2008

Position	Nation	Number	Name	Nemzeti Bajnokság II	Hungarian Cup	Total
1	(Poland)	99	Wojciech Zarzycki	12	1	13
2	(Hungary)	16	Ádám Holczer	2	0	2
3	(Hungary)	35	Kálmán Szabó	0	2	2
4	(Hungary)	66	Bence Somodi	0	0	0
			TOTALS	14	3	17
