= 2008–09 Baktalórántháza VSE season =

Baktalórántháza
2008–09 season
- Manager: János Kovács (until 13 January); László Illés & Pál Gebri (from 13 January)
- Stadium: Városi Stadion
- Nemzeti Bajnokság II (East): 13th
- Magyar Kupa: Second round
- Ligakupa: Group stage
- Top goalscorer: League: László Illés (9); All: László Illés (11)
- Highest home attendance: 750 (vs Ferencváros, 23 May 2009)
- Lowest home attendance: 100 (multiple league cup matches)
- Average home league attendance: 296

The 2008–09 season was Baktalórántháza Városi Sportegyesület's 61st competitive season, 4th consecutive season in the Nemzeti Bajnokság II and 92nd year in existence as a football club. In addition to the domestic league, Baktalórántháza participated in this season's editions of the Magyar Kupa and Ligakupa.

In addition to the previously announced 4 NB II teams, the club has joined with 3 more teams in the Ligakupa, their first and last appearance in the competition. The team's winter preparations started with a new head coach, replacing János Kovács with László Illés, who also played as a player during the season. As a player-club manager with an unusual solution, he was replaced by Pál Gebri while he was playing on the pitch. In the last round, ESMTK were defeated by Debrecen II, which allowed Baktalórántháza to avoid relegation.

== First team squad ==
The players listed had league appearances and stayed until the end of the season.

Note: Flags indicate national team as defined under FIFA eligibility rules; some limited exceptions apply. Players may hold more than one non-FIFA nationality.

No.	Pos.	Nation	Player
1	GK	HUN	Zoltán Nagy
3	DF	HUN	Ádám Mező
4	DF	HUN	Tamás Tolnai
5	DF	HUN	Zoltán Vágó
6	MF	HUN	József Kozma
7	DF	HUN	Gyula Márkus
7	MF	HUN	Gábor Szűcs
8	MF	HUN	Gergely Simon (loaned from Nyíregyháza)
9	DF	HUN	János Bodnár
10	MF	HUN	László Illés
12	FW	HUN	Gábor Marics

No.	Pos.	Nation	Player
12	FW	HUN	Róbert Szabó
13	MF	HUN	Attila Kozma
13	MF	HUN	Szabolcs Tóth
14	MF	HUN	Tibor Deák
15	MF	HUN	Zsolt Rakóczi
16	DF	HUN	István Szenes
17	DF	HUN	György Koskovits
20	MF	HUN	Krisztián Szilágyi
21	MF	HUN	Zoltán Zámbori
88	GK	HUN	Gábor Sándor

== Transfers ==
=== Transfers in ===
Date	Pos.	No.	Player	From	Ref
22 July 2008	GK	1	(Hungary) Zoltán Nagy	Tuzsér	
22 July 2008	MF	20	(Hungary) Krisztián Szilágyi	Tuzsér	
24 July 2008	MF	14	(Hungary) Tibor Deák	Nyíregyháza	
24 July 2008	MF	21	(Hungary) Mihály Szabó	Mándok	
24 July 2008	DF	5	(Hungary) Zoltán Vágó	Mezőkövesd	
25 July 2008	DF	4	(Hungary) Tamás Tolnai	Újpest	
4 August 2008	MF	16	(Hungary) Marius Doros	Mátészalka	
1 January 2009	DF	3	(Hungary) Ádám Mező	Balmazújváros	

=== Transfers out ===
Date	Pos.	No.	Player	To	Ref
4 February 2009	MF	5	(Hungary) Gyula Illés	Zalaegerszeg	
9 February 2009	MF	16	(Hungary) Marius Doros	(Romania) Unirea Dej	
18 February 2009	MF	21	(Hungary) Mihály Szabó	Balkány	

=== Loans in ===
Start date	End date	Pos.	No.	Player	From	Ref
29 August 2008	31 December 2008	DF	3	(Hungary) Ádám Mező	Balmazújváros	
1 February 2009	End of season	MF	8	(Hungary) Gergely Simon	Nyíregyháza	

=== Loans out ===
Start date	End date	Pos.	No.	Player	To	Ref

== Competitions ==
=== Overview ===
Competition	First match	Last match	Starting round	Final position	Record							
Competition	First match	Last match	Starting round	Final position	Pld	W	D	L	GF	GA	GD	Win %
Nemzeti Bajnokság II	10 August 2008	13 June 2009	Matchday 1	13th	30	8	6	16	37	63	−26	26.67
Magyar Kupa	20 August 2008	20 August 2008	Second round	Second round	1	0	1	0	0	0	+0	0.00
Ligakupa	1 October 2008	14 February 2009	Group stage	Group stage	10	0	0	10	3	41	−38	0.00
Total					41	8	7	26	40	104	−64	19.51

Source: Competitions

=== Nemzeti Bajnokság II ===
==== League table ====
Pos	Team	Pld	W	D	L	GF	GA	GD	Pts	Promotion or relegation
11	Vecsés	30	10	6	14	45	51	−6	36	
12	Békéscsaba	30	9	7	14	42	62	−20	34	
13	Baktalórántháza	30	8	6	16	37	63	−26	30	
14	Erzsébeti Spartacus (R)	30	8	5	17	46	68	−22	29	Relegation to Nemzeti Bajnokság III
15	Jászberény (R)	30	7	7	16	31	56	−25	28	Relegation to Nemzeti Bajnokság III

Source: Hungarian Football Federation (in Hungarian), Soccerway
Rules for classification: 1) Points; 2) Matches won; 3) Goal difference; 4) Goals scored; 5) Head-to-head points; 6) Head-to-head goal difference; 7) Head-to-head away goals scored; 8) Fair play ranking; 9) Drawing of lots.
(R) Relegated

==== Results summary ====
Overall								Home						Away					
Pld	W	D	L	GF	GA	GD	Pts	W	D	L	GF	GA	GD	W	D	L	GF	GA	GD
30	8	6	16	37	63	−26	30	7	2	6	28	24	+4	1	4	10	9	39	−30

Source: HFF

==== Results by round ====
Round	1	2	3	4	5	6	7	8	9	10	11	12	13	14	15	16	17	18	19	20	21	22	23	24	25	26	27	28	29	30
Ground	A	H	A	A	H	A	H	A	H	A	H	A	H	A	H	H	A	H	H	A	H	A	H	A	H	A	H	A	H	A
Result	L	W	L	D	W	L	L	L	W	L	W	L	W	L	W	D	D	L	W	W	L	D	L	L	L	D	L	L	D	L
Position	14	11	12	13	8	11	14	15	12	12	10	11	11	11	10	10	11	13	11	9	11	11	11	12	12	12	13	13	13	13

Source: Matches
A = Away; H = Home; W = Win; D = Draw; L = Loss

==== Matches ====
10 August 2008 1	MTK II	3–0	Baktalórántháza	Budapest
17:30 CEST (UTC+2)	M. Molnár 22', 58'; L. Szabó 43' (pen.); Busai (yellow card) 68'	Report	T. Tolnai (yellow card) 18'; G. Illés (yellow card) 60'	Stadium: Promontor utcai Stadion; Attendance: 100; Referee: Krisztián Pánczél

16 August 2008 2	Baktalórántháza	2–1	Kazincbarcika	Baktalórántháza
17:30 CEST (UTC+2)	R. Szabó 22', (yellow card) 79'; T. Tolnai 45'; G. Koskovits (yellow card) 49'	Report	D. Debreceni (yellow card) 70'; I. Kerekes 81'; P. Bányai (yellow card) 90'	Stadium: Városi Stadion; Attendance: 300; Referee: Ádám Farkas

23 August 2008 3	Szolnok	4–0	Baktalórántháza	Szolnok
15:00 CEST (UTC+2)	Antal 11'; P. Bálint (yellow card) 48'; T. Szabó 55'; Zana 82', 90'	Report	T. Deák (yellow card) 30'; Z. Nagy (yellow card) 55'; G. Illés (yellow card) 76'	Stadium: Tiszaligeti Stadion; Attendance: 200; Referee: Roland Veizer

30 August 2008 4	Debrecen II	0–0	Baktalórántháza	Debrecen
17:30 CEST (UTC+2)	Ludánszki (yellow card) 3'; Szatmári (yellow card) 58'; J. Varga (yellow card) 83'; Szilágyi (yellow card) 89'	Report	Z. Rakóczi (yellow card) 5'; Mező (yellow card) 32'; T. Tolnai (yellow card) 55'; R. Szabó (yellow card) 56'; M. Doros (yellow card) 83'; K. Szilágyi (red card) 85'	Stadium: Dóczy József utcai Sportpálya; Attendance: 300; Referee: Ferenc Szöllősi

7 September 2008 5	Baktalórántháza	4–1	Makó	Baktalórántháza
16:30 CEST (UTC+2)	Z. Vágó (yellow card) 3'; J. Kozma 11', 43', 62'; R. Szabó 33'	Report	C. Dálnaki 71'	Stadium: Városi Stadion; Attendance: 300; Referee: László Varga

13 September 2008 6	Vecsés	2–1	Baktalórántháza	Vecsés
16:30 CEST (UTC+2)	Faragó 14'; B. Buza 21'; Pisont (yellow card) 74'; Hungler (yellow card) 76'; Lukács (red card) 90'	Report	T. Tamás 24'; T. Deák (yellow card) 32'; Mező (yellow card) 54'; Z. Rakóczi (red card) 90'	Stadium: Stadion Dózsa György út Attendance: 250; Referee: József Berger

20 September 2008 7	Baktalórántháza	0–1	Tököl	Baktalórántháza
16:00 CEST (UTC+2)	G. Illés (yellow card) 12'; T. Tolnai (yellow card) 60'; J. Bodnár (yellow card) 73'; T. Deák (yellow card) 75'	Report	R. Mojzes (yellow card) 73'; S. Palásti 84'; Gasparik (yellow card) 86'	Stadium: Városi Stadion; Attendance: 300; Referee: Ádám Farkas

28 September 2008 8	Bőcs	5–0	Baktalórántháza	Bőcs
16:00 CEST (UTC+2)	Menougong 11', 24', (yellow card) 77'; G. Jeney (yellow card) 27'; G. Gaál (red card) 45'; G. Szakszon (yellow card) 55'; R. Zsarnai 58'; J. Ondó 75'; F. Martis (yellow card) 88'; Lipták 89'	Report	Z. Rakóczi (yellow card) 28'; Mező (yellow card) 30'; T. Deák (red card) 45'	Stadium: Szabadság utcai Stadion; Attendance: 300; Referee: Zsolt Szabó

5 October 2008 9	Baktalórántháza	2–1	Békéscsaba	Baktalórántháza
15:00 CEST (UTC+2)	G. Illés (yellow card) 10'; A. Kozma (yellow card) 18'; Mező (yellow card) 35'; G. Márkus (yellow card) 58'; R. Szabó 77'; L. Illés 86' (pen.)	Report	T. Horváth (yellow card) 8'; Brlázs (yellow card) 38'; Szeverényi (yellow card) 39'; Pozsár 40'; Ursz (yellow card) 43'; R. Ladányi (yellow card) 51'	Stadium: Városi Stadion; Attendance: 300; Referee: Roland Veizer

12 October 2008 10	BKV Előre	3–0	Baktalórántháza	Budapest
15:00 CEST (UTC+2)	Halgas 8'; E. Varga (yellow card) 33'; G. Gulyás (yellow card) 53', (goal) 60'; P. Hammer 71'	Report	J. Kozma (yellow card) 20'; L. Illés (yellow card) 29'; K. Szilágyi (yellow card) 53'; G. Sándor (yellow card) 60'	Stadium: Sport utcai stadion Attendance: 200; Referee: Szabolcs Szilasi

18 October 2008 11	Baktalórántháza	4–2	Jászberény	Baktalórántháza
14:30 CEST (UTC+2)	J. Kozma 2'; L. Illés 9', 72'; R. Szabó 45'; Mező (yellow card) 46'	Report	L. Lukácsi (red card) 29'; Á. Hamar 36'; Hidvégi (yellow card) 54'; G. Mohácsi 86' (pen.)	Stadium: Városi Stadion; Attendance: 300; Referee: Róbert Nagy

25 October 2008 12	Ferencváros	3–0	Baktalórántháza	Budapest
16:00 CEST (UTC+2)	Morrison 27'; B. Tóth 42'; Pölöskei 64'	Report		Stadium: Üllői úti Stadion; Attendance: 2,500; Referee: Gábor Oláh

1 November 2008 13	Baktalórántháza	2–1	Vác	Baktalórántháza
13:30 CET (UTC+1)	G. Sándor (yellow card) 23'; Z. Rakóczi 37'; G. Illés (yellow card) 54'; L. Illés 83'; Z. Vágó (yellow card) 88'	Report	Vén 21', (yellow card) 72'; Hirt (yellow card) 24'	Stadium: Városi Stadion; Attendance: 200; Referee: Roland Veizer

9 November 2008 14	ESMTK	4–0	Baktalórántháza	Budapest
13:30 CET (UTC+1)	G. Agócs (yellow card) 14'; Újhegyi 19', 68'; A. Tvaruska 45'; D. Vörös 90'	Report	Mező (yellow card) 29'; K. Szilágyi (yellow card) 57'; A. Kozma (yellow card) 83'	Stadium: Ady Endre utca Attendance: 250; Referee: Gábor Fajkusz

15 November 2008 15	Baktalórántháza	3–0	Cegléd	Baktalórántháza
13:30 CET (UTC+1)	J. Bodnár (yellow card) 24'; R. Szabó 41', 44'; L. Illés 56', (yellow card) 84'; Z. Vágó (yellow card) 59'	Report	B. Fehér (yellow card) 14'; Barna (yellow card) 55'	Stadium: Városi Stadion; Attendance: 200; Referee: Péter Pető

7 March 2009 16	Baktalórántháza	1–1	MTK II	Baktalórántháza
17:30 CET (UTC+1)	K. Szilágyi 48'; Z. Vágó (yellow card) 73'	Report	Gál (yellow card) 57'; M. Molnár 77'	Stadium: Városi Stadion; Attendance: 200; Referee: László Varga

14 March 2009 17	Kazincbarcika	2–2	Baktalórántháza	Kazincbarcika
14:30 CET (UTC+1)	T. Nagy 15', (yellow card) 50'; Stevica (yellow card) 23'; Á. Zimányi (yellow card) 39'; G. Máthé 74'	Report	Z. Vágó (yellow card) 24'; J. Bodnár (yellow card) 46'; Z. Rakóczi (yellow card) 55'; J. Kozma (yellow card) 59', (goal) 88'; G. Simon 80'; G. Marics (yellow card) 82'	Stadium: Pete András Stadion; Attendance: 300; Referee: Gergely Szőts

21 March 2009 18	Baktalórántháza	0–3; Awarded	Szolnok	Baktalórántháza
15:00 CET (UTC+1)	G. Simon 18'; Z. Vágó (yellow card) 41'; J. Bodnár (yellow card) 60'; T. Tolnai (yellow card) 73'; L. Illés 85'	Report	Z. Molnár 60'; Kiss (yellow card) 65'; Hullám 73'; Rebecsák (yellow card) 84'; Zana (yellow card) 88'	Stadium: Városi Stadion; Attendance: 200; Referee: Roland Veizer
Note: The match ended in a 2–2 draw, but after a successful protest by Szolnok, the result was overturned in their favour.

29 March 2009 19	Baktalórántháza	4–3	Debrecen II	Baktalórántháza
16:00 CEST (UTC+2)	Z. Rakóczi (yellow card) 27'; I. Szenes (yellow card) 37'; T. Tolnai (yellow card) 45'; L. Illés 69', 77'; G. Marics 78'; G. Simon 89'	Report	Faggyas 4', 54', (yellow card) 31'; Spitzmüller 44'; Z. Nagy (red card) 67'; Ćosić (yellow card) 80'	Stadium: Városi Stadion; Attendance: 200; Referee: Róbert Nagy

5 April 2009 20	Makó	1–2	Baktalórántháza	Makó
16:30 CEST (UTC+2)	Z. Rakonczai (yellow card) 35'; S. Maróti 78', (yellow card) 90+2'; Bány (yellow card) 83'	Report	Z. Rakóczi 31'; J. Kozma 80'	Stadium: Stadium Erdei Ferenc tér Attendance: 600; Referee: Ferenc Bede

11 April 2009 21	Baktalórántháza	0–1	Vecsés	Baktalórántháza
16:30 CEST (UTC+2)	G. Simon (yellow card) 23'; K. Szilágyi (yellow card) 32'; J. Bodnár (yellow card) 38'; Mező (yellow card) 56'	Report	C. Dévai (yellow card) 3'; D. Molnár (yellow card) 22'; Lukács 57' (pen.); K. Kőhalmi (yellow card) 70'; D. Gyenes (yellow card) 90+2'	Stadium: Városi Stadion; Attendance: 300; Referee: Ádám Farkas

18 April 2009 22	Tököl	0–0	Baktalórántháza	Tököl
17:00 CEST (UTC+2)		Report	T. Deák (yellow card) 74'	Stadium: Tököl VSE Sporttelep; Attendance: 100; Referee: Gergely Szőts

25 April 2009 23	Baktalórántháza	0–1	Bőcs	Baktalórántháza
17:00 CEST (UTC+2)	G. Simon (yellow card) 43'; I. Szenes (yellow card) 84'; L. Illés (red card) 85'	Report	Z. Molnár (yellow card) 17'; Urbin 90' (pen.); Cséke (red card) 90+1'	Stadium: Városi Stadion; Attendance: 200; Referee: Roland Veizer

1 May 2009 24	Békéscsaba	2–1	Baktalórántháza	Békéscsaba
19:00 CEST (UTC+2)	Pozsár 9' (pen.); Balázs 32'; Futaki (yellow card) 77'; Ursz (yellow card) 81'	Report	J. Kozma (yellow card) 13'; T. Deák 22'; J. Bodnár (yellow card) 48'; T. Tolnai (yellow card) 57'	Stadium: Kórház utcai Stadion; Attendance: 600; Referee: Tibor II Gyarmati

9 May 2009 25	Baktalórántháza	2–3	BKV Előre	Baktalórántháza
17:30 CEST (UTC+2)	G. Simon 78'; Mező (yellow card) 79', (goal) 89'; I. Szenes (yellow card) 86'	Report	P. Hammer 24'; G. Gulyás (yellow card) 45'; E. Varga (yellow card) 52'; Csopaki 53'; Á. Mayer (yellow card) 64'; M. Gulyás 87'; C. Petruska (yellow card) 89'	Stadium: Városi Stadion; Attendance: 300; Referee: Róbert Nagy

17 May 2009 26	Jászberény	1–1	Baktalórántháza	Jászberény
18:00 CEST (UTC+2)	Á. Hamar 24'; L. Gulyás (yellow card) 74'; A. Bárkányi (yellow card) 83'	Report	Z. Rakóczi (yellow card) 19'; J. Bodnár (yellow card) 24'; J. Kozma 30'; T. Deák (yellow card) 70'; T. Tolnai (yellow card) 74'; Z. Vágó (yellow card) 86'	Stadium: Városi Stadion; Attendance: 300; Referee: Gábor Oláh

23 May 2009 27	Baktalórántháza	2–3	Ferencváros	Baktalórántháza
16:00 CEST (UTC+2)	T. Tolnai (yellow card) 34', (goal) 64'; G. Marics 39'	Report	Fitos 10'; Ferenczi 30'; Lipcsei 68'; Kamaté (yellow card) 78'	Stadium: Városi Stadion; Attendance: 750; Referee: László Varga

30 May 2009 28	Vác	2–1	Baktalórántháza	Vác
18:00 CEST (UTC+2)	G. Tányéros (yellow card) 12'; Rusvay 26'; D. Kocsis 43', (yellow card) 83'; Hegedűs (yellow card) 56'; Albert (red card) 66'	Report	J. Kozma (yellow card) 31'; Z. Vágó (yellow card) 35'; L. Illés (yellow card) 38', (goal) 49'; Mező (yellow card) 70'; T. Tolnai (yellow card) 88'	Stadium: Ligeti Stadion; Attendance: 100; Referee: István Mészáros

6 June 2009 29	Baktalórántháza	2–2	ESMTK	Baktalórántháza
18:00 CEST (UTC+2)	T. Tolnai (yellow card) 16'; K. Szilágyi (yellow card) 18', (goal) 33'; Z. Rakóczi (yellow card) 48'; I. Szenes (yellow card) 53'; L. Illés (yellow card) 72'; J. Kozma 81'; J. Bodnár (red card) 86'; T. Deák (red card) 90+1'	Report	D. Obot 2', (red card) 88'; A. Péter 17'; A. Tvaruska (yellow card) 23'; L. Marosfalvi (yellow card) 32'; D. Vörös (yellow card) 67'; Farkas (yellow card) 75'	Stadium: Városi Stadion; Attendance: 400; Referee: Gábor Péter Kovács

13 June 2009 30	Cegléd	7–1	Baktalórántháza	Cegléd
18:00 CEST (UTC+2)	D. Horváth 1', 31'; Z. Szabó 24', 57', 64', 72'; A. Tóth (yellow card) 50'; J. Olasz 75'	Report	Z. Vágó (yellow card) 5'; Sánta 34' (o.g.)	Stadium: Malomtó széli stadion Attendance: 400; Referee: Ádám Farkas

=== Magyar Kupa ===
20 August 2008 Second round	Mezőkövesd	0–0 (a.e.t.) (4–2 p)	Baktalórántháza	Mezőkövesd
16:30 CEST (UTC+2)	P. Nagy (yellow card) 10'; N. Kaszás (yellow card) 11'; J. Olasz (yellow card) 33'; S. Sivák (yellow card) 47'	Report	Z. Vágó (yellow card) 11'; G. Illés (yellow card) 15'; G. Márkus (yellow card) 59'; J. Bodnár (yellow card) 61'; M. Doros (yellow card) 67'	Stadium: Városi Stadion; Referee: László Mencsik
Note: Mezőkövesd won on penalty kicks 4–2.

=== Ligakupa ===
==== Group stage ====
Pos	Team	Pld	W	D	L	GF	GA	GD	Pts	Qualification	FEH	HON	FER	KEC	RAK	BAK
1	Fehérvár	10	7	3	0	29	9	+20	24	Advance to knockout phase	—	2–2	0–0	2–0	4–0	8–0
2	Honvéd	10	5	4	1	33	16	+17	19	Advance to knockout phase	1–1	—	2–2	5–3	8–1	5–1
3	Ferencváros	10	5	4	1	20	10	+10	19		2–3	2–2	—	2–1	3–0	3–0
4	Kecskemét	10	3	2	5	22	17	+5	11		2–3	2–3	0–0	—	2–2	4–0
5	Rákospalota	10	3	1	6	14	28	−14	10		2–4	1–0	2–3	0–3	—	4–1
6	Baktalórántháza	10	0	0	10	3	41	−38	0		0–2	1–5	0–3	0–5	0–2	—

Source: HFF

1 October 2008 1	Baktalórántháza	0–3	Ferencváros	Baktalórántháza
15:30 CEST (UTC+2)	M. Doros (yellow card) 41'; Z. Vágó (yellow card) 47'	Report	Pölöskei (yellow card) 12'; Szalai 19'; Kourouma 50'; Bartholomew 85'	Stadium: Városi Stadion; Attendance: 500; Referee: Zoltán Iványi

15 October 2008 2	Baktalórántháza	0–2	Fehérvár	Baktalórántháza
15:00 CEST (UTC+2)	K. Szilágyi (yellow card) 41'	Report	Dvéri (yellow card) 38'; Lattenstein 51'; Disztl 64'	Stadium: Városi Stadion; Attendance: 100; Referee: Gábor Fajkusz

29 October 2008 3	Kecskemét	4–0	Baktalórántháza	Kecskemét
17:00 CET (UTC+1)	Némedi 32' (pen.); Litsingi 52'; G. Koskovits 78' (o.g.); Disney 90+1'	Report	M. Szabó (yellow card) 25'; T. Tolnai (yellow card) 31'	Stadium: Széktói Stadion; Attendance: 150; Referee: Ferenc Szöllősi

5 November 2008 4	Baktalórántháza	0–2	Rákospalota	Baktalórántháza
13:30 CET (UTC+1)	L. Illés (yellow card) 68'	Report	Dancs 62', 83'; Kőhalmi (yellow card) 68'	Stadium: Városi Stadion; Attendance: 100; Referee: Róbert Nagy

11 November 2008 5	Baktalórántháza	1–5	Honvéd	Baktalórántháza
13:30 CET (UTC+1)	L. Illés 13', (yellow card) 69'; K. Szilágyi (yellow card) 40'; T. Tolnai (yellow card) 83'; Z. Vágó (red card) 84'	Report	Arsenijević 7', 33'; Dieng 20'; Ivancsics 39', 60'; Debreceni (yellow card) 56'; F. Kocsis (red card) 84'	Stadium: Városi Stadion; Attendance: 100; Referee: Zoltán Iványi

22 November 2008 6	Ferencváros	3–0	Baktalórántháza	Budapest
13:00 CET (UTC+1)	L. Brettschneider 16'; Baranyai 49'; Fülöp 76'	Report	J. Kozma (yellow card) 18'; M. Szabó (yellow card) 46'	Stadium: Üllői úti stadion Attendance: 300; Referee: Krisztián Pánczél

29 November 2008 7	Fehérvár	8–0	Baktalórántháza	Székesfehérvár
13:00 CET (UTC+1)	G. Horváth II 8'; Pavličić 19', 26'; Dvéri 37', 40'; Kocsis (yellow card) 38'; Kulcsár 45', 55', 83'	Report		Stadium: Sóstói Stadion; Attendance: 100; Referee: Gergő Janitz

2 December 2008 8	Baktalórántháza	0–5	Kecskemét	Baktalórántháza
13:30 CET (UTC+1)	T. Tolnai (yellow card) 48'	Report	Z. Ábel (yellow card) 24'; Gyagya (yellow card) 34'; Menyhárt 42'; Montvai 44', 51'; L. Sándor 81'; S. Nagy 89'; Rusvay (yellow card) 90'	Stadium: Városi Stadion; Attendance: 100; Referee: Roland Veizer

7 February 2009 9	Rákospalota	4–1	Baktalórántháza	Budapest
14:00 CET (UTC+1)	Torma 37', 67'; Kapcsos 39'; Erős (yellow card) 45'; Z. Varga 52'; Pintér (yellow card) 88'	Report	G. Marics 25'; T. Tolnai (yellow card) 36'; G. Koskovits (red card) 49'; T. Deák (yellow card) 71'	Stadium: Stadion Budai II. Laszló; Attendance: 150; Referee: Mihály Fábián

14 February 2009 10	Honvéd	5–1	Baktalórántháza	Budapest
13:00 CET (UTC+1)	Maróti (yellow card) 40'; Guié 50', 81'; Dieng 58'; Arsenijević 62'; Smiljanić 67'	Report	K. Szilágyi (yellow card) 16'; L. Illés 41'; T. Tolnai (yellow card) 51'	Stadium: Bozsik Stadion; Attendance: 300; Referee: Katalin Kulcsár

== Statistics ==
=== Overall ===
Appearances (Apps) numbers are for appearances in competitive games only, including sub appearances.
Source: Competitions

No.	Player	Pos.	Nemzeti Bajnokság II				Magyar Kupa				Ligakupa				Total			
No.	Player	Pos.	Apps	Goal	Booked	Sent off (straight red)	Apps	Goal	Booked	Sent off (straight red)	Apps	Goal	Booked	Sent off (straight red)	Apps	Goal	Booked	Sent off (straight red)
1	(Hungary) Dávid Kasza																	
1	(Hungary) Zoltán Nagy	GK	14		1						9				23		1	
3	(Hungary) Ádám Mező	DF	26	1	9						10				36	1	9	
4	(Hungary) Tamás Tolnai	DF	26	2	10		1				8		5		35	2	15	
5	(Hungary) Gyula Illés	MF	12		5		1		1		6				19		6	
5	(Hungary) Zoltán Vágó	DF	26		9		1		1		8		1	1	35		11	1
6	(Hungary) József Kozma	MF	28	8	4						8		1		36	8	5	
7	(Hungary) Gyula Márkus	DF	10		1		1		1		1				12		2	
7	(Hungary) Gábor Szűcs	MF	1								2				3			
8	(Hungary) Gergely Simon	MF	14	4	2						1				15	4	2	
9	(Hungary) János Bodnár	DF	23		7	1	1		1		8				32		8	1
10	(Hungary) László Illés	MF	22	9	4	1					8	2	2		30	11	6	1
12	(Hungary) Gábor Marics	FW	26	2	1						7	1			33	3	1	
12	(Hungary) János Perényi																	
12	(Hungary) Róbert Szabó	FW	15	6	2		1				4				20	6	2	
13	(Hungary) Attila Kozma	MF	13		2		1				7				21		2	
13	(Hungary) Szabolcs Tóth	MF	10				1				8				19			
14	(Hungary) Tibor Deák	MF	20	1	5	2	1				6		1		27	1	6	2
15	(Hungary) Zsolt Rakóczi	MF	25	2	6	1	1				4				30	2	6	1
16	(Hungary) Marius Doros	MF	4		1		1		1		2		1		7		3	
16	(Hungary) István Szenes	DF	21		4						8				29		4	
17	(Hungary) György Koskovits	DF	23		1		1				8			1	32		1	1
20	(Hungary) Krisztián Szilágyi	MF	24	2	4	1					10		3		34	2	7	1
21	(Hungary) Mihály Szabó	MF	6				1				8		2		15		2	
21	(Hungary) Zoltán Zámbori	MF	9								9				18			
88	(Hungary) Gábor Sándor	GK	16		2		1				4				21		2	
Own goals																		
Totals				37	80	6			5			3	16	2		40	101	8

=== Hat-tricks ===
No.	Player	Against	Result	Date	Competition	Round
6	(Hungary) József Kozma	Makó	4–1 (H)	7 September 2008	Nemzeti Bajnokság II	5

=== Clean sheets ===
			Clean sheets			
No.	Player	Games Played	Nemzeti Bajnokság II	Magyar Kupa	Ligakupa	Total
88	(Hungary) Gábor Sándor	21	2	1	0	3
1	(Hungary) Zoltán Nagy	23	1		0	1
Totals			3	1	0	4
