= Zsivoczky =

Zsivoczky is a Hungarian surname. Notable people with the surname include:

- Attila Zsivoczky (born 1977), Hungarian athlete
- Norbert Zsivóczky (born 1988), Hungarian footballer

== See also ==
- Györgyi Zsivoczky-Farkas (born 1985), Hungarian athlete
