= Mohamed Kourouma =

Mohamed Kourouma is the name of:

- Lamine Kourouma (Mohamed Lamine Kourouma, born 1987), Ivorian footballer
- Mohamed Kourouma (soccer) (born 1990), Canadian soccer player
