= Vasas =

Vasas may refer to:

- Vasas SC, Hungarian sports club
- Győri Vasas, former name of Hungarian sports club Győri ETO (1950-65)
- Mihály Vasas (born 1933), Hungarian footballer and manager
- Zoltán Vasas (born 1977), Hungarian footballer
