= Tamás Szalai =

Tamás Szalai may refer to:

- Tamás Szalai (footballer, born 1980), Hungarian footballer
- Tamás Szalai (footballer, born 1984), Hungarian footballer
- Tamas Szalai (canoeist), Hungarian canoeist
