= Bamba Moussa =

Ivorian footballer

Moussa Bamba
Personal information
- Date of birth: 6 January 1985 (age 41)
- Place of birth: Abidjan, Ivory Coast
- Height: 1.85 m (6 ft 1 in)
- Position: Defensive midfielder

Senior career*
Years	Team	Apps	(Gls)
2003–2006	JC Abidjan		
2006–2009	Sheffield United		
2007	→ Chengdu Blades (loan)	0	(0)
2007	→ Shenzhen Xiangxue Eisiti (loan)	14	(1)
2008–2009	→ Ferencváros (loan)	18	(1)
2009–2010	Sannat Lions		
2010–2013	SC Bacău		
2014	FC Zagon		
2014–2017	Victoria Hotspurs		
2017–2018	Xewkija Tigers		
2018–2020	Victoria Wanderers		
- * Club domestic league appearances and goals

Moussa Bamba (born 6 January 1985) is an Ivorian former professional footballer who played as a defensive midfielder.

== Career ==
Bamba was born in Abidjan. He was playing for Jeunesse Club d'Abidjan in Ivory Coast Premier Soccer League when he was scouted by Sheffield United. He signed a three-year contract with Sheffield United in 2006. Due to work permit problems in the United Kingdom, he was loaned to Chengdu Blades Bamba was in the Chinese Premier Soccer League for two seasons, and went to Ferencváros in the 2008–09 season. He was a regular player in the squad. He was signed from Chengdu Blades in 2008 alongside fellow Ivorians Dramane Kamate, Sékou Tidiane Souare and Kourouma Mohamed Lamine. Bamba Moussa with other colleagues helped Ferencváros to gain promotion to Hungarian premiership in June 2009. On 2 October 2009, he was on trial with Argeş Piteşti, but did not sign a contract. On 11 January 2010, Moussa joined Chimia Râmnicu Vâlcea. The club said they could not afford to acquire him, so he did not sign a contract. On 31 January 2010, Bamba joined to Sannat Lions of the Gozo First Division and signed a contract with the club. His work was well appreciated because he helped them to win the relegation match and stay in the first division and also helped them to win a cup. For the 2010–11 season, he signed with SC Bacău, a second division club in Romania. In 2014, Moussa joined FC Zagon.

In July 2018, Moussa joined Victoria Wanderers. He played there until February 2019, where he joined CSM Lugoj.

== Personal life ==
Bamba married on 3 November 2009 his Romanian girlfriend; he met his wife while playing in Hungary, the couple lived in Bucharest. On 7 December 2009, he was granted an indefinite residence in Romania.
