= Jordan Robertson =

English footballer (born 1988)

Personal information
- Full name: Jordan Steven Robertson
- Date of birth: 12 February 1988 (age 38)
- Place of birth: Sheffield, England
- Height: 6 ft 0 in (1.83 m)
- Position: Striker

Youth career
- –2006: Sheffield United

Senior career*
Years	Team	Apps	(Gls)
2006–2009	Sheffield United	0	(0)
2006	→ Torquay United (loan)	9	(2)
2007	→ Northampton Town (loan)	15	(3)
2007–2008	→ Dundee United (loan)	14	(3)
2008	→ Oldham Athletic (loan)	2	(1)
2008	→ Southampton (loan)	10	(1)
2009	→ Ferencváros (loan)	8	(3)
2009	→ Bury (loan)	4	(1)
2011	St Johnstone	6	(0)
2011–2012	Scunthorpe United	19	(3)
2013	Global FC	3	(2)
2013–2014	Gaz Metan Mediaş	19	(4)
2014–2015	Bromley	10	(2)
2015	Farnborough	7	(2)
2015–2016	Alfreton Town	21	(5)
2016–2017	Harrogate Town	10	(1)
Total		157	(33)
- * Club domestic league appearances and goals

Jordan Steven Robertson (born 12 February 1988) is an English former professional footballer who played as a striker.

Born in Sheffield he began his career with Sheffield United but failed to ever break into the first team. He was loaned out to a number of clubs during his time with United, including Torquay United, Northampton Town, Dundee United, Oldham Athletic, Southampton, Ferencváros and Bury. While with Southampton he was involved in a traffic accident in which the driver of the other car was killed. Robertson was subsequently jailed for 32 months for causing death by dangerous driving. On his release from prison he returned to football and had a spell with St Johnstone before spending a year at Scunthorpe United.

== Playing career ==
=== Sheffield United ===
Robertson joined his hometown club Sheffield United as a trainee, becoming part of the club's Academy team, appearing regularly for them during his school years. He joined Torquay United on a one-month loan in November 2006. He made his Football League debut for Torquay on 18 November 2006, replacing Mickey Evans late on in a home defeat against Swindon Town. He scored his first league goal the following week in a 5–2 defeat away to Peterborough United. He returned to Sheffield Unite after Torquay's 1–0 defeat away to Bristol Rovers.

By January 2007 Robertson was again loaned out, this time joining Northampton Town for the remainder of the season. He scored on his debut against Oldham Athletic. and went on to play fifteen times for Northampton.

In August 2007, a loan move to Dundee United in Scotland was agreed, although there was initial confusion over whether it was until January, or May. It was later confirmed that Robertson was on loan for the duration of the season but Sheffield United could recall him in January if desired. Robertson scored on his Dundee United debut with a late winner in a League Cup match against Ross County. Robertson scored four goals for Dundee United before being recalled in mid-January 2008.

Robertson again undertook a one-month loan deal in February 2008, this time with Oldham Athletic. He picked up an ankle injury in a game against Rochdale which would rule him out for much of the remainder of the season and so returned to Sheffield United early, having played three games and scored one goal for Oldham.

Robertson made his first team debut for Sheffield United in September 2008, as a second-half substitute during a 6–0 defeat against Arsenal in the third round of the League Cup.

After the club's exit from the League Cup, Robertson joined Championship club Southampton on a three-month loan deal with Southampton winger Nathan Dyer heading in the opposite direction. Robertson scored his first goal for Southampton against Norwich City, a strike from the corner of the box that curled into the top corner. This was his only goal for the club, and he was recalled to Sheffield United at the end of December 2008.

Following his return from Southampton Robertson was again loaned out, this time to Sheffield United's Hungarian sister club Ferencváros. After completing the rest of the 2008–09 season on loan in Hungary, Robertson returned to Sheffield United once more. After making a substitute appearance in the first round of the League Cup at the start of the following season he was again loaned out, this time to League Two side Bury. Robertson made his Bury debut away to Darlington on 15 August 2009, scoring the only goal in a 1–0 win for Bury. Robertson's loan was cut short by Bury on 12 September 2009 after playing four games and scoring once.

=== Post prison career ===
After his release from prison, Robertson was invited to train with Dundee United in February 2011, before signing for their Tayside rivals St Johnstone on 31 March 2011. Robertson soon left St Johnstone and finally got a one-year contract with Scunthorpe United on 7 June 2011.

He was released by the club in May 2012. After a year without club he signed for Philippines club Global FC. In the only game for the club against Warriors F.C. he scored the second goal in the 2–0 victory for Global. Shortly after he left the club and signed for Romania Liga I side Gaz Metan Mediaş. Following this, he signed for Bromley in September 2014. He scored his first goal just a day after joining the club, in a 5-1 FA Cup win over Uxbridge, after coming on as a late substitute.

He left the club in February 2015, and signed for Farnborough in March.

On 4 September 2015, Robertson signed for Alfreton Town on a contract until the end of the season.

He joined Harrogate Town ahead of the 2016–17 season. On 13 January 2017, the club announced he was released.

== Personal life ==
Following his retirement from playing in 2017, Robertson began working as a football agent.

=== Dangerous driving charge ===
In December 2008, Robertson was driving his Mercedes CLC 180 car on the southbound carriageway of the M1 by junction 19 near Lutterworth, when he attempted to change songs on his MP3 player, this distraction caused him to lose control of his vehicle and as a result his car veered into Omar Mohamed's Ford Galaxy. Mohamed, a father of five, was airlifted to Walsgrave Hospital in Coventry. However his injuries proved fatal, and he died with his wife at his bedside.

On Christmas Day 2008, Robertson was arrested on suspicion of dangerous driving. On 2 October 2009, Robertson was sentenced to 32 months in prison for causing death by dangerous driving. He was also banned from driving for five years by the court.
