= Wu Bo (footballer) =

Chinese footballer (born 1989)

Personal information
- Date of birth: 21 February 1989 (age 37)
- Place of birth: Nanchang, Jiangxi, China
- Height: 1.75 m (5 ft 9 in)
- Position: Midfielder

Youth career
- 2001–2002: Jiangxi Provincial Sports School
- 2002–2005: Sichuan Mingyu

Senior career*
Years	Team	Apps	(Gls)
2006–2009	Sichuan		
2009	→ Ferencvárosi (loan)	0	(0)
2009–2010	Chengdu Blades		
2010	→ Tianjin Songjiang (loan)		
2011–2012	Tianjin Songjiang		
2013–2014	Chengdu Tiancheng	11	(0)
2015–2016	Lijiang Jiayunhao	22	(1)
2017–2019	Sichuan Longfor	54	(0)
2020	Sichuan Huakun		

International career
- China U19
- * Club domestic league appearances and goals

Wu Bo (Chinese: 吴波; born 21 February 1989), is a Chinese former footballer who played as a midfielder.

== Club career ==
=== Early career ===
Born in Nanchang in the Jiangxi Province of China, Wu first took an interest in football at the age of twelve - relatively late for a professional footballer. Having initially played football at school, his physical education teacher took him to the Jiangxi Provincial Amateur Sports School, and it was there that he began his footballing career in 2001.

The following year, his coach at the school, Hu Shida, was approached by semi-professional side Sichuan Mingyu for a job as a coach, and after he accepted the offer, he brought five players from the school, including Wu. Wu later stated that he accepted the club's offer as his academic performance was average, and as there were no professional football clubs in Nanchang, he decided his best option to pursue a career in the sport would be to accept.

=== Sichuan ===
He stayed in Chengdu for the next few years, before joining newly founded Sichuan - a professional side formed by the Sichuan Football Association after the dissolution of the former Sichuan team competing in the Chinese Super League, Sichuan First City. Wu spent three seasons with Sichuan, helping them earn promotion to the China League One, and establishing himself as one of their first-choice midfielders.

Ahead of the 2009 season, he was subject to a bid by Chinese Super League side Chengdu Blades. However, it was revealed that there had been an issue with his registration with Sichuan; as he had been registered with the Sichuan Football Association, it was unclear as to which club had ownership over his rights, with Chengdu Blades vice-president, Ma Mingyu, believing that he was still officially a player of Sichuan Mingyu - the club Ma himself had founded.

Sichuan and Chengdu Blades played a friendly in March 2009, with Wu on the bench for Chengdu Blades, and rumours circulating that, if his new club were to lose, he would have to return to Sichuan. Despite Chengdu Blades winning 4–0, Wu, who did not feature in the game, remained with Sichuan. However, due to the revelation of his registration issues, he was unable to register in the league, only being allowed to train with the squad. He was loaned to Hungarian side, and Chengdu Blades affiliate, Ferencvárosi to allow him to play competitive football, but he struggled to adapt, and he returned to China.

=== Chengdu Blades and Tianjin Songjiang ===
After half a year, an agreement was reached between Ma Mingyu, Sichuan and the Sichuan Football Association, and Wu signed officially for Chengdu Blades. Following the club's relegation to the China League One due to their part in a 2009 match-fixing scandal, Wu struggled to establish himself in the team, and he was loaned to China League Two side Tianjin Songjiang for the 2010 season.

Having immediately established himself at his new club, and becoming the team's free-kick taker, he helped them to promotion in 2010, and the following year he joined on a permanent basis. He left the club following the expiration of his contract at the end of the 2012 season, and returned to Chengdu Blades, stating that he wanted to return to the city as he regarded it as his second hometown.

=== Later career ===
Wu remained with Chengdu Blades, who were renamed Chengdu Tiancheng in December 2013, for two seasons, before spells with Lijiang Jiayunhao and Sichuan Longfor. Following the dissolution of Sichuan Longfor, he joined Chinese Champions League side Sichuan Huakun in April 2020, and in his only season with the club, he helped them earn promotion to the China League Two.

== Career statistics ==
=== Club ===
Appearances and goals by club, season and competition
Club	Season	League			Cup (Note: Includes Chinese FA Cup)		Other		Total	
Club	Season	Division	Apps	Goals	Apps	Goals	Apps	Goals	Apps	Goals
Ferencvárosi (loan)	2009–10	Nemzeti Bajnokság I	0	0	0	0	0	0	0	0
Chengdu Tiancheng	2013	China League One	1	0	0	0	0	0	1	0
Chengdu Tiancheng	2014	China League One	10	0	0	0	0	0	10	0
Chengdu Tiancheng	Total		11	0	0	0	0	0	11	0
Lijiang Jiayunhao	2015	China League Two	6	1	1	0	2 (Note: Appearances in the China League Two playoffs)	0	9	1
Lijiang Jiayunhao	2016	China League Two	16	0	0	0	4	0	20	0
Lijiang Jiayunhao	Total		22	1	1	0	6	0	29	1
Sichuan Longfor	2017	China League Two	21	0	0	0	2	0	23	0
Sichuan Longfor	2018	China League Two	18	0	2	0	5	0	25	0
Sichuan Longfor	2019	China League One	15	0	0	0	1	0	16	0
Sichuan Longfor	Total		54	0	2	0	8	0	64	0
Career total			87	1	3	0	14	0	104	1
