= József Ursz =

Hungarian footballer

Personal information
- Date of birth: 27 July 1982 (age 44)
- Place of birth: Békéscsaba, Hungary
- Height: 1.77 m (5 ft 10 in)
- Position: Midfielder

Youth career
- Békéscsabai Előre FC

Senior career*
Years	Team	Apps	(Gls)
2002–	Békéscsabai Előre FC	73	(3)
2005	→ Szolnoki MÁV FC (loan)	12	(1)
2006	→ Kecskeméti TE (loan)	11	(0)
- * Club domestic league appearances and goals as of 14 April 2009

József Ursz (born 27 July 1982) is a Hungarian footballer who plays for Békéscsabai Előre FC as midfielder.
