= Carlos Diaz (soccer, born 1987) =

American soccer player

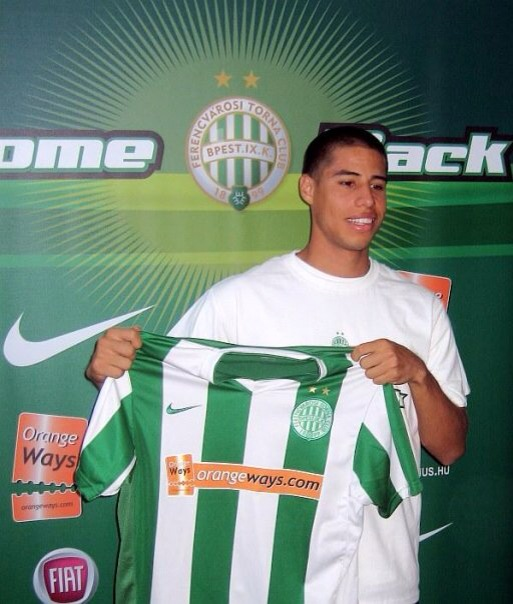
- Diaz signing for Hungarian Club Ferencváros

Personal information
- Full name: Jose Carlos Diaz
- Date of birth: 15 April 1987 (age 39)
- Place of birth: Napa, California, United States
- Height: 5 ft 10 in (1.78 m)
- Positions: Forward; central midfielder

Youth career
- 2001–2005: Vintage High School
- 2005–2007: St. Mary's College
- 2005–2007: SF Seals

Senior career*
Years	Team	Apps	(Gls)
2007	Sheffield United	0	(0)
2007–2009	Ferencvárosi	14	(18)
2008-2009	→ Tököl VSK (loan)	15	(17)
2009–2010	W Connection	16	(18)
2010–2011	Paysandu	12	(13)

International career^{‡}
2006–2007	United States U20	0	(0)
- * Club domestic league appearances and goals as of 7 April 2013 ‡ National team caps and goals as of 1 November 2008

Jose Carlos Diaz (born April 15, 1987) is an American former soccer player who played as a forward.

== Youth club career ==
Born in Napa, California, he played with soccer youth clubs Napa Soccer Club, and Santa Rosa United in California, and played at Vintage High School before playing two years of college soccer for St. Mary's College. Was called up to United States U20 in 2005 during his time at St. Mary's College

== Professional club career ==
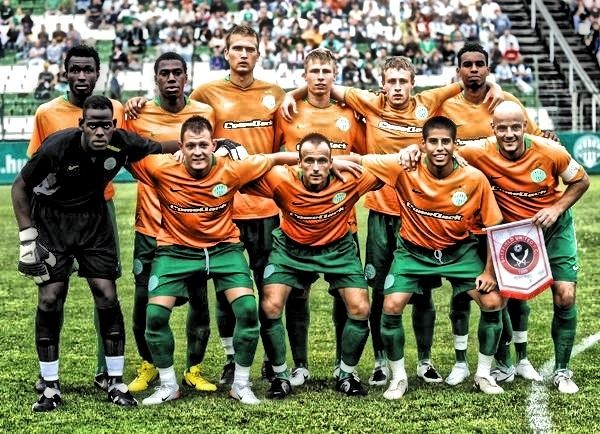
Ferencváros starting eleven in friendly match against Sheffield United

During his time on trial in the Premier League with Football Clubs Newcastle United, Bolton Wanderers, and Blackpool. Carlos was spotted by Sheffield United Director Terry Robinson to sign for Hungarian association football club Ferencváros and started in first club friendly match against Sheffield United. Due to injuries was loaned out to Tököl VSK for 6 months. Before the 2009–10 CONCACAF Champions League he was transferred to W Connection of Trinidad and Tobago in 2009. He scored two CONCACAF Champions League goals in his first start for the club in a 3–2 victory over Real C.D. España in the 2009–10 CONCACAF Champions League group stage. In 2010, Carlos signed for Brazilian Club Paysandu. In January 2013, while in pre-season camp with Colorado Rapids in preparation for the upcoming season Carlos faced two injuries in left ankle and left knee.
