= Sékou Tidiane Souaré =

Ivorian footballer

Sékou Tidiane
Personal information
- Full name: Sékou Tidiane Souaré
- Date of birth: 9 April 1983 (age 43)
- Place of birth: Abidjan, Ivory Coast
- Height: 1.86 m (6 ft 1 in)
- Positions: Defensive midfielder; central defender

Team information
- Current team: B36 Tórshavn
- Number: 6

Youth career
- 2000–2003: Stade d'Abidjan

Senior career*
Years	Team	Apps	(Gls)
2000–2003	Stade d'Abidjan	35	(5)
2003–2004	ASEC Mimosas	17	(2)
2004–2006	Sabé Sports de Bouna	36	(4)
2006–2007	Jeunesse Club d'Abidjan	20	(3)
2007–2009	Sheffield United F.C	0	(0)
2007–2008	→ Chengdu Blades F.C. (loan)	30	(3)
2008	→ Ferencvárosi TC (loan)	12	(2)
2009–2010	Horoya AC		
2010–2011	Sliema Wanderers F.C.	20	(3)
2012	B36 Tórshavn	22	(5)
2012	Għajnsielem F.C.		
2012	Al-Shorta SC	0	(0)
- * Club domestic league appearances and goals

Sékou Tidiane Souaré (born 9 April 1983 in Abidjan) is an Ivorian footballer, who last played for Al-Shorta SC as a defensive midfielder or central defender.

== Career ==
He was signed by Ferencvarosi TC from Chengdu Blades in 2008 alongside fellow Ivorians Bamba Moussa, Kourouma Mohamed Lamine and Dramane Kamate. Souare was bought by Sheffield United F.C in January transfer of 2007 and he was loaned to Chengdu Blades F.C. Due to work permit problem in the United Kingdom, in the 2008-09 season, he was again loaned out to Ferencvarosi TC and returned in the summer of 2009, but a year after he joined Maltese side Sliema Wanderers as a free player. In November 2011, Souare signed with Faroese champions B36 Tórshavn.
