= Ádám Holczer =

Hungarian footballer (born 1988)

Personal information
- Date of birth: 28 March 1988 (age 38)
- Place of birth: Ajka, Hungary
- Height: 1.93 m (6 ft 4 in)
- Position: Goalkeeper

Team information
- Current team: Soroksár
- Number: 31

Senior career*
Years	Team	Apps	(Gls)
2007–2010	Ferencváros	23	(0)
2007	→ Vecsés (loan)	21	(0)
2010–2011	Kecskemét	12	(0)
2011	Nyíregyháza	9	(0)
2011–2014	Pécs	0	(0)
2012–2013	→ Gyirmót (loan)	23	(0)
2014	→ Kozármisleny (loan)	10	(0)
2014–2017	Soroksár	79	(0)
2017–2019	Ferencváros	7	(0)
2019–2021	Paks	18	(0)
2021–2022	Tiszakecske	36	(0)
2022–	Soroksár	53	(0)
- * Club domestic league appearances and goals as of 31 May 2026

Ádám Holczer (born 28 March 1988) is a Hungarian football player who plays for Soroksár.

== Career statistics ==
Appearances and goals by club, season and competition
Club	Season	League			Cup		League Cup		Europe		Total	
Club	Season	Division	Apps	Goals	Apps	Goals	Apps	Goals	Apps	Goals	Apps	Goals
Vecsés	2007–08	Nemzeti Bajnokság II	21	0	0	0	—		—		21	0
Kecskemét
Kecskemét	2009–10	Nemzeti Bajnokság I	7	0	0	0	—		—		7	0
Kecskemét	2010–11	Nemzeti Bajnokság I	5	0	0	0	1	0	—		6	0
Kecskemét	Total		12	0	0	0	1	0	—		13	0
Nyíregyháza	2010–11	Nemzeti Bajnokság II	9	0	0	0	—		—		9	0
Pécs	2011–12	Nemzeti Bajnokság I	0	0	0	0	4	0	—		4	0
Gyirmót
Gyirmót	2012–13	Nemzeti Bajnokság II	18	0	2	0	2	0	—		22	0
Gyirmót	2013–14	Nemzeti Bajnokság II	5	0	2	0	6	0	—		13	0
Gyirmót	Total		23	0	4	0	8	0	—		35	0
Kozármisleny	2013–14	Nemzeti Bajnokság II	10	0	0	0	—		—		10	0
Soroksár
Soroksár	2014–15	Nemzeti Bajnokság II	30	0	0	0	0	0	—		30	0
Soroksár	2015–16	Nemzeti Bajnokság II	28	0	2	0	—		—		30	0
Soroksár	2016–17	Nemzeti Bajnokság II	21	0	0	0	—		—		21	0
Soroksár	Total		79	0	2	0	0	0	—		81	0
Ferencváros
Ferencváros	2008–09	Nemzeti Bajnokság II	19	0	0	0	7	0	—		26	0
Ferencváros	2009–10	Nemzeti Bajnokság I	4	0	1	0	4	0	—		9	0
Ferencváros	2016–17	Nemzeti Bajnokság I	5	0	2	0	—		—		7	0
Ferencváros	2017–18	Nemzeti Bajnokság I	1	0	1	0	—		0	0	2	0
Ferencváros	2018–19	Nemzeti Bajnokság I	1	0	4	0	—		0	0	5	0
Ferencváros	Total		30	0	8	0	11	0	0	0	49	0
Paks
Paks	2019–20	Nemzeti Bajnokság I	12	0	4	0	—		—		16	0
Paks	2020–21	Nemzeti Bajnokság I	6	0	3	0	—		—		9	0
Paks	Total		18	0	7	0	—		—		25	0
Career total			202	0	21	0	24	0	0	0	247	0

Updated to games played as of 15 May 2021.
