= Bálint Nyilasi =

Hungarian footballer

Personal information
- Full name: Bálint Nyilasi
- Date of birth: 20 March 1990 (age 36)
- Place of birth: Budapest, Hungary
- Height: 1.85 m (6 ft 1 in)
- Position: Midfielder

Team information
- Current team: Dunaföldvár (manager)

Youth career
- 2003–2009: Ferencváros

Senior career*
Years	Team	Apps	(Gls)
2009–2013	Ferencváros	1	(0)
2009–2013	Ferencváros II	84	(19)
2013–2014	Sopron	9	(1)
2014–2017	Csákvár	39	(2)
2019	Kartal	3	(0)
2020–2023	Szent István	19	(0)
2023	Szent István II	2	(0)
Total		157	(22)

Managerial career
- 2024–: Dunaföldvár
- * Club domestic league appearances and goals

Bálint Nyilasi (born 20 March 1990) is a Hungarian professional football manager and former player, who is currently the manager of Nemzeti Bajnokság III club Dunaföldvár.

== Club career ==
On 26 May 2012, Nyilasi played his first match for Ferencváros in a 4–2 lose against Paks in the Nemzeti Bajnokság I.

Csákvár parted ways with him during the first half of the 2017–18 season.

== Managerial career ==
He was appointed as manager of Nemzeti Bajnokság III side Dunaföldvár, which finished fifth in the previous season.

== Personal life ==
Nyilasi is the son of Tibor Nyilasi, a retired international football player.

== Career statistics ==
Appearances and goals by club, season and competition
Club	Season	League			Cup		League Cup		Europe		Total	
Club	Season	Division	Apps	Goals	Apps	Goals	Apps	Goals	Apps	Goals	Apps	Goals
Ferencváros
Ferencváros	2008–09	Nemzeti Bajnokság II	0	0	0	0	3	1	0	0	3	1
Ferencváros	2009–10	Nemzeti Bajnokság I	0	0	0	0	9	1	0	0	9	1
Ferencváros	2010–11	Nemzeti Bajnokság I	0	0	0	0	2	1	0	0	2	1
Ferencváros	2011–12	Nemzeti Bajnokság I	1	0	0	0	5	2	0	0	6	2
Ferencváros	2012–13	Nemzeti Bajnokság I	0	0	0	0	1	0	0	0	1	0
Ferencváros	Total		1	0	0	0	21	5	0	0	22	5
Sopron	2013–14	Nemzeti Bajnokság II	9	1	2	1	4	2	0	0	15	4
Career total			10	1	2	1	25	7	0	0	37	9

Updated to games played as of 1 December 2013.
