= Dramane Kamaté =

Ivorian footballer

Personal information
- Full name: Dramane Kamaté
- Date of birth: 31 August 1985 (age 41)
- Place of birth: Abidjan, Ivory Coast
- Height: 1.75 m (5 ft 9 in)
- Position: Striker

Team information
- Current team: Andorra CF

Youth career
- 2003–2006: Jeunesse d'Abidjan

Senior career*
Years	Team	Apps	(Gls)
2006–2009	Sheffield United	3	(1)
2007	→ Chengdu Blades (loan)	1	(0)
2008–2009	→ Ferencváros (loan)	12	(2)
2009–2010	Korofina		
2010–2012	Racing de Ferrol		
2012–2013	Rayo Cantabria		
2013–2014	Hellín		
2014–	Andorra CF		
- * Club domestic league appearances and goals as of 16:04, 27 November 2015 (UTC)

Dramane Kamaté (born 31 August 1985 in Abidjan, Ivory Coast) is a professional footballer who currently plays for Andorra CF in the Spanish Third Division Group 17.

== Career ==
He was signed from Chengdu Blades in 2008 alongside fellow Ivorians Bamba Moussa, Sékou Tidiane Souare and Kourouma Mohamed Lamine. After one season for Ferencvarosi TC of the eastern group of the Hungarian second division, he left in the middle of 2009 to sign for AS Korofina in Mali. After one year in Mali returned to Europe, to sign with Spanish Second Division club Racing Club de Ferrol. After two years and 12 games, joined to SD Rayo Cantabria.

=== International ===
He also has played for the Ivory Coast national under-23 football team.
