= Gábor Pozsár =

Hungarian footballer

Personal information
- Date of birth: 29 March 1981 (age 45)
- Place of birth: Békéscsaba, Hungary
- Height: 1.71 m (5 ft 7 1/2 in)
- Position: Midfielder

Senior career*
Years	Team	Apps	(Gls)
1997–2000	Békéscsaba	48	(5)
2001–2004	Orosháza	26	(10)
2004–2005	Békéscsaba	19	(2)
2005–2006	Szolnok	24	(7)
2006–2014	Békéscsaba	205	(84)
2014–2015	Szeged-Csanád	0	(0)
- * Club domestic league appearances and goals

Gábor Pozsár (born 29 March 1981) is a Hungarian former football forward.

== Career statistics ==
Appearances and goals by club, season and competition
Club	Season	League		Cup		League Cup		Europe		Total	
Club	Season	Apps	Goals	Apps	Goals	Apps	Goals	Apps	Goals	Apps	Goals
Békéscsaba
Békéscsaba	1997–98	3	0	0	0	0	0	0	0	3	0
Békéscsaba	1998–99	27	3	0	0	0	0	0	0	27	3
Békéscsaba	1999–00	18	2	0	0	0	0	0	0	18	2
Békéscsaba	2004–05	19	2	3	1	0	0	0	0	22	3
Békéscsaba	2006–07	28	8	0	0	0	0	0	0	28	8
Békéscsaba	2007–08	21	27	3	3	0	0	0	0	24	30
Békéscsaba	2008–09	28	18	0	0	0	0	0	0	28	18
Békéscsaba	2009–10	27	8	0	0	0	0	0	0	27	8
Békéscsaba	2010–11	29	9	1	0	0	0	0	0	30	9
Békéscsaba	2011–12	26	5	5	3	0	0	0	0	31	8
Békéscsaba	2012–13	24	6	4	3	0	0	0	0	28	9
Békéscsaba	2013–14	22	3	4	3	4	2	0	0	30	8
Békéscsaba	Total	272	91	20	13	4	2	0	0	296	106
Orosháza
Orosháza	2002–03	26	10	3	1	0	0	0	0	29	11
Orosháza	Total	26	10	3	1	0	0	0	0	29	11
Szolnok
Szolnok	2005–06	24	7	0	0	0	0	0	0	24	7
Szolnok	Total	24	7	0	0	0	0	0	0	24	7
Career total		322	108	23	14	4	2	0	0	349	124

Updated to games played as of 1 June 2014.
