= Norbert Zsivóczky =

Hungarian footballer

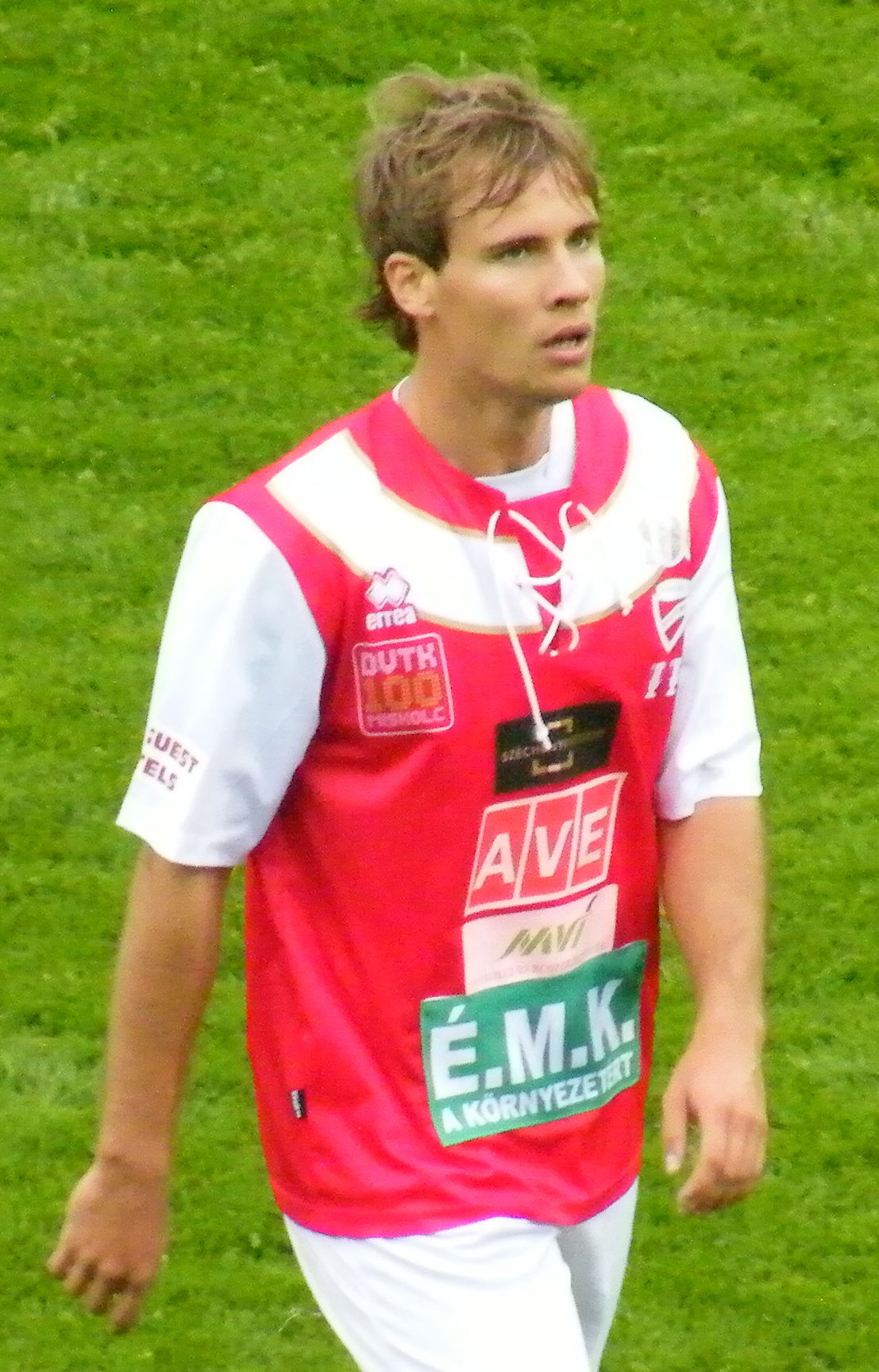

Personal information
- Full name: Norbert Zsivóczky
- Date of birth: 16 February 1988 (age 38)
- Place of birth: Budapest, Hungarian People's Republic
- Position: Midfielder

Team information
- Current team: Szigetszentmiklós
- Number: 10

Youth career
- 2000–2004: Ferencváros
- 2004–2007: Stoke City

Senior career*
Years	Team	Apps	(Gls)
2007–2010	Ferencváros	32	(5)
2010–2011	Diósgyőr	15	(0)
2011	Pápa	0	(0)
2011–2013	Ferencváros	6	(0)
2012–2013	→ Szigetszentmiklós (loan)	19	(1)
2013–	Szigetszentmiklós	12	(3)

International career
2004–2005	Hungary U-17		
- * Club domestic league appearances and goals as of 3 November 2013

Norbert Zsivóczky (born 16 February 1988 in Budapest) is a Hungarian football player who currently plays for szigetszentmiklósi TK.
