= Noel Fülöp =

Hungarian footballer

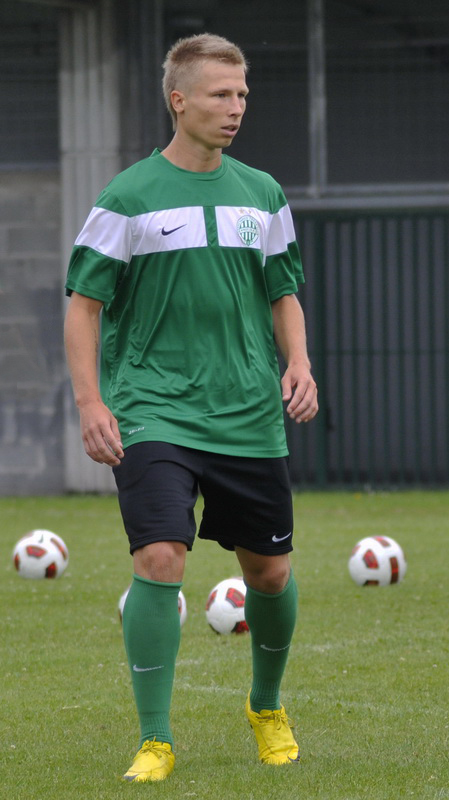

Personal information
- Date of birth: 29 January 1988 (age 38)
- Place of birth: Százhalombatta, Hungary
- Height: 1.83 m (6 ft 0 in)
- Position: Right back

Team information
- Current team: MTK II

Youth career
- 2003–2005: Szent István
- 2005–2007: Ferencváros

Senior career*
Years	Team	Apps	(Gls)
2007–2012	Ferencváros	32	(2)
2007–2008	→ Mosonmagyaróvár (loan)	15	(0)
2010	→ Szigetszentmiklós (loan)	14	(2)
2012–2017	Siófok	50	(0)
2015–2016	→ Soroksár (loan)	26	(0)
2016–2017	→ Soroksár (loan)	24	(0)
2017–2018	Soroksár	76	(1)
2018–2019	Monor	36	(1)
2019–2020	MTK Budapest	20	(0)
2020–2021	Tiszakécske	28	(0)
2021–	MTK II	23	(0)
- * Club domestic league appearances and goals as of 8 May 2022

Noel Fülöp (born 29 January 1988) is a Hungarian football player who plays for MTK II.

== Career statistics ==
As of 27 May 2020.

Appearances and goals by club, season and competition
Club	Season	League			Cup		Continental		Other		Total	
Club	Season	Division	Apps	Goals	Apps	Goals	Apps	Goals	Apps	Goals	Apps	Goals
Ferencváros	2006–07	Nemzeti Bajnokság II	0	0	1	0	—		0	0	1	0
Ferencváros	2007–08	Nemzeti Bajnokság II	9	0	0	0	—		0	0	9	0
Ferencváros	2008–09	Nemzeti Bajnokság II	12	2	1	0	—		5	1	18	3
Ferencváros	2009–10	Nemzeti Bajnokság I	3	0	0	0	—		7	0	10	0
Ferencváros	2010–11	Nemzeti Bajnokság I	0	0	0	0	—		4	0	4	0
Ferencváros	2011–12	Nemzeti Bajnokság I	7	0	0	0	3	0	2	0	12	0
Ferencváros	2012–13	Nemzeti Bajnokság I	1	0	0	0	—		0	0	1	0
Ferencváros	Total		32	2	2	0	3	0	18	1	55	3
Ferencváros II	2009–10	Nemzeti Bajnokság III	8	1	—		—		—		8	1
Ferencváros II	2010–11	Nemzeti Bajnokság III	30	1	—		—		—		30	1
Ferencváros II	2011–12	Nemzeti Bajnokság III	22	1	—		—		—		22	1
Ferencváros II	Total		60	3	0	0	0	0	0	0	60	3
Mosonmagyaróvár	2007–08	Nemzeti Bajnokság II	15	0	0	0	—		0	0	15	0
Mosonmagyaróvár	Total		15	0	0	0	0	0	0	0	15	0
Szigetszentmiklós	2009–10	Nemzeti Bajnokság II	14	2	0	0	—		0	0	14	2
Szigetszentmiklós	Total		14	2	0	0	0	0	0	0	14	2
Siófok	2012–13	Nemzeti Bajnokság I	2	0	0	0	—		2	0	4	0
Siófok	2013–14	Nemzeti Bajnokság II	24	0	2	0	—		4	0	30	0
Siófok	2014–15	Nemzeti Bajnokság II	24	0	2	0	—		3	0	29	0
Siófok	Total		50	0	4	0	0	0	7	0	61	0
Soroksár	2015–16	Nemzeti Bajnokság II	27	0	1	0	—		0	0	28	0
Soroksár	2016–17	Nemzeti Bajnokság II	26	1	2	0	—		0	0	28	1
Soroksár	2017–18	Nemzeti Bajnokság II	26	1	3	0	—		0	0	29	1
Soroksár	Total		79	2	6	0	0	0	0	0	85	2
Monor	2018–19	Nemzeti Bajnokság II	36	1	1	0	—		0	0	37	1
Monor	Total		36	1	1	0	0	0	0	0	37	1
MTK Budapest	2019–20	Nemzeti Bajnokság II	20	0	9	0	—		0	0	29	0
MTK Budapest	Total		20	0	9	0	0	0	0	0	29	0
Career total			306	10	22	0	3	0	25	1	356	11
