= Zoltán Vasas =

Hungarian footballer

Personal information
- Full name: Zoltán Vasas
- Date of birth: 5 November 1977 (age 48)
- Place of birth: Hungary
- Height: 1.89 m (6 ft 2 1/2 in)
- Position: Defender

Team information
- Current team: Vecsés FC

Youth career
- 1991–1995: MTK Hungária FC
- 1995–1997: Érdi VSE
- 1997–1999: Békéscsaba 1912 Előre SE
- 1999–2001: Szegedi LC

Senior career*
Years	Team	Apps	(Gls)
2001–2005	Győri ETO	25	(0)
2002–2003	FC Fehérvár (loan)		
2005	Nyíregyháza Spartacus	10	(0)
2006	Zalaegerszegi TE	11	(1)
2007	Integrál-DAC		
2007	Sligo Rovers F.C.		
2008	Ferencvárosi TC	15	(0)
2008–2009	FK DAC 1904 Dunajská Streda		
2009–	Vecsés FC		
- * Club domestic league appearances and goals

Zoltán Vasas (born 5 November 1977) is a Hungarian football player who plays for Vecsés FC in the Hungarian second division.

Vasas has previously played for Győri ETO and Zalaegerszegi TE, making a total of 152 appearances in the Hungarian NB I.
