= Tamás Szalai (footballer, born 1984) =

Hungarian footballer

Personal information
- Full name: Tamás Szalai
- Date of birth: 12 June 1984 (age 42)
- Place of birth: Komárom, Hungary
- Height: 1.71 m (5 ft 7 in)
- Position: Striker

Team information
- Current team: Tatabánya
- Number: 8

Senior career*
Years	Team	Apps	(Gls)
2004–2008	Ferencvárosi TC	76	(6)
2007	→ Mosonmagyaróvári FC(loan)	16	(4)
2008–2009	Tatabánya	13	(3)
- * Club domestic league appearances and goals

Tamás Szalai (born 12 June 1984) is a Hungarian football player who currently plays for Tatabánya in the NBII.

== Honours ==
- Ferencvárosi TC
  - Nemzeti Bajnokság I: 1
  - Magyar Kupa: 1
  - Szuperkupa: 1
- Canoe sprint at the 2015 European Games – Men's K-2 1000 metres — Gold medal
