= Lamine Kourouma =

Ivorian footballer

Personal information
- Full name: Mohamed Lamine Kourouma
- Date of birth: 1 January 1987 (age 39)
- Place of birth: Abidjan, Ivory Coast
- Height: 1.78 m (5 ft 10 in)
- Position: Midfielder

Team information
- Current team: Hassania Agadir
- Number: 11

Youth career
- –2006: Jeunesse Club d'Abidjan

Senior career*
Years	Team	Apps	(Gls)
2006–2007	Sheffield United F.C.		
2007–2009	→ Chengdu Blades F.C. (loan)		
2008–2009	→ Ferencvárosi TC (loan)	18	(2)
2009–	Hassania Agadir	?	(?)

International career
2005	Ivory Coast B		
- * Club domestic league appearances and goals as of 16:04, 08 July 2009 (UTC)

Mohamed Lamine Kourouma (born January 1, 1987, in Abidjan, Ivory Coast) is a professional footballer who currently plays for Hassania Agadir.

== Career ==
Kourouma began his career with Jeunesse Club d'Abidjan and was scouted in 2006 from Sheffield United F.C., after playing in England in 2007 was loaned out to Chinese farmteam Chengdu Blades. After a short time with Chengdu Blades he has played for Hungarian club Ferencvarosi TC in the 2007/2008 Season and in 2008/09 season helped the NB II team gain promotion to the first division in Hungarian NB I. After the ending of his contract with Sheffield United F.C. turned back to Africa and signed in summer 2009 with Maroccain club Hassania Agadir.

== International career ==
Kourouma played in 2005 for Ivory Coast national football team B and has played in junior national teams of Ivory Coast.
