= 2004–05 Ferencvárosi TC season =

Ferencvárosi TC
2004–05 season
- Chairman: János Furulyás
- Manager: Csaba László
- Stadium: Üllői úti stadion
- NB 1: Runners-up
- Hungarian Cup: Runners-up
- UEFA Champions League: Third qualifying round
- UEFA Cup: Group stage
- Top goalscorer: League: Aleksandar Bajevski (10); All: Dénes Rósa (15)

The 2004–05 season will be Ferencvárosi TC's103rd competitive season, 103rd consecutive season in the Borsodi Liga and 105th year in existence as a football club.

== Squad ==
As of match played 30 May 2005

No.	Name	Nationality	Position	Date of birth (age)	Signed from	Signed in	Apps.	Goals
Goalkeepers
1	Milán Udvarácz	(Hungary)	GK	9 December 1967 (aged 37)	Kispest-Honvéd	2002	59	0
22	Lajos Szűcs	(Hungary)	GK	8 August 1973 (aged 31)	Kaiserslautern	2000	185	4
80	Krisztián Berki	(Hungary)	GK	1 July 1980 (aged 24)	Siófok	2004	0	0
Defenders
3	Ákos Takács	(Hungary)	DF	14 February 1982 (aged 23)	youth sector	2003	12	0
4	György Kiss	(Hungary)	DF	22 May 1975 (aged 30)	Dunaferr	2003	30	2
21	Dragan Vukmir	(Serbia and Montenegro)	DF	2 August 1978 (aged 26)	Dinamo Pančevo	2002	93	0
23	Sorin Botiș	(Romania)	DF	14 April 1978 (aged 27)	Sheriff Tiraspol	2003	29	2
24	Gábor Gyepes	(Hungary)	DF	26 June 1981 (aged 23)	youth sector	1999	114	13
78	Zoltán Balog	(Hungary)	DF	22 February 1978 (aged 27)	Cegléd	2000	87	0
79	Zsolt Bognár	(Hungary)	DF	28 March 1979 (aged 26)	Győr	2002	37	1
Midfielders
5	Igor Szkukalek	(Slovakia)	MF	1 July 1976 (aged 28)	Drnovice	2001	76	1
6	Péter Lipcsei	(Hungary)	MF	28 March 1972 (aged 33)	Austria Salzburg	2000	309	69
7	Gábor Zavadszky	(Hungary)	MF	10 September 1974 (aged 30)	MTK Budapest	2004	130	20
11	Szabolcs Huszti	(Hungary)	MF	18 April 1983 (aged 22)	youth sector	2003	24	3
13	Tamás Somorjai	(Hungary)	MF	12 January 1980 (aged 25)	youth sector	1999	15	1
14	Tamás Szalai	(Hungary)	MF	12 June 1984 (aged 20)	youth sector	2003	2	0
20	Dénes Rósa	(Hungary)	MF	7 April 1977 (aged 28)	Újpest	2003	52	10
51	János Zováth	(Hungary)	MF	25 February 1977 (aged 28)	Dunaferr	2003	36	0
53	Adem Kapič	(Slovenia)	MF	16 April 1975 (aged 30)	Alemannia Aachen	2002	69	1
88	Dániel Tőzsér	(Hungary)	MF	12 May 1985 (aged 20)	Galatasaray	2004	27	1
Forwards
8	Árpád Nógrádi	(Hungary)	FW	14 March 1983 (aged 22)	youth sector	2003	5	1
9	Aleksandar Bajevski	(North Macedonia)	FW	8 December 1979 (aged 25)	Siófok	2004	28	10
10	Leandro	(Hungary)	FW	19 March 1982 (aged 23)	Szombathelyi Haladás	2002	70	7
17	Marius Sasu	(Romania)	FW	1 October 1975 (aged 29)	Kispest-Honvéd	2003	34	5
28	Robert Vágner	(Czech Republic)	FW	12 May 1974 (aged 31)	Energie Cottbus	2004	20	6
90	Thomas Sowunmi	(Hungary)	FW	25 July 1978 (aged 26)	Dunaferr	2003	31	7
99	Marek Penksa	(Slovakia)	FW	4 August 1973 (aged 31)	Dunaferr	2002	73	6
Players away on loan
35	Kálmán Szabó	(Hungary)	GK	27 July 1980 (aged 23)	youth sector	2003	0	0
Players who left during the season

== Transfers ==
=== Summer ===
In: Note: Flags indicate national team as defined under FIFA eligibility rules; some limited exceptions apply. Players may hold more than one non-FIFA nationality.

No.	Pos.	Nation	Player
7	MF	HUN	Gábor Zavadszky (from MTK Budapest)
9	FW	MKD	Aleksandar Bajevski (from Siófok)
11	MF	HUN	Szabolcs Huszti (loan return from Sopron)
28	FW	CZE	Robert Vágner (from (Germany) Energie Cottbus)
80	GK	HUN	Krisztián Berki (from Siófok)
88	MF	HUN	Dániel Tőzsér (from (Turkey) Galatasaray)

Out: Note: Flags indicate national team as defined under FIFA eligibility rules; some limited exceptions apply. Players may hold more than one non-FIFA nationality.

No.	Pos.	Nation	Player
9	FW	SCG	Aleksandar Jović (Retired)
26	DF	HUN	Attila Dragóner (to (Portugal) Vitória Guimarães)
27	MF	HUN	Attila Kriston (to Videoton)
28	MF	HUN	Sándor Károlyi (to Pécs)
30	MF	HUN	Zoltán Gera (to (England) West Bromwich Albion)
35	GK	HUN	Kálmán Szabó (loan to Tatabánya)
55	FW	HUN	Attila Tököli (to (Germany) 1. FC Köln)

=== Winter ===
In: Note: Flags indicate national team as defined under FIFA eligibility rules; some limited exceptions apply. Players may hold more than one non-FIFA nationality.

No.	Pos.	Nation	Player

Out: Note: Flags indicate national team as defined under FIFA eligibility rules; some limited exceptions apply. Players may hold more than one non-FIFA nationality.

No.	Pos.	Nation	Player
4	DF	HUN	György Kiss (to Vasas)
7	MF	HUN	Gábor Zavadszky (to (Cyprus) Apollon Limassol)
10	FW	HUN	Leandro (to (Brazil) Atlético Paranaense)
13	MF	HUN	Tamás Somorjai (to Sopron)
51	MF	HUN	János Zováth (to (Cyprus) AEP Paphos)

== Competitions ==
=== Overview ===
Competition	First match	Last match	Starting round	Final position	Record							
Competition	First match	Last match	Starting round	Final position	Pld	W	D	L	GF	GA	GD	Win %
Nemzeti Bajnokság I	8 August 2004	26 May 2005	Matchday 1	Runners-up	30	17	5	8	56	31	+25	56.67
Hungarian Cup	27 October 2004	11 May 2004	Round of 32	Runners-up	5	4	0	1	14	8	+6	80.00
UEFA Champions League	27 July 2004	25 August 2004	Second qualifying round	Third qualifying round	4	2	0	2	4	5	−1	50.00
UEFA Cup	16 September 2004	16 December 2004	First round	Group stage	6	2	2	2	7	7	+0	33.33
Total					45	25	7	13	81	51	+30	55.56

Last updated: 26 May 2005
Source: Competitions

=== Nemzeti Bajnokság I ===
==== League table ====
Pos	Team	Pld	W	D	L	GF	GA	GD	Pts	Qualification or relegation
1	Debrecen (C)	30	19	5	6	57	25	+32	62	Qualification for Champions League second qualifying round
2	Ferencváros	30	17	5	8	56	31	+25	56	Qualification for UEFA Cup first qualifying round
3	MTK Budapest (Note: Deducted 1 points)	30	16	9	5	47	26	+21	56	
4	Újpest	30	15	10	5	60	34	+26	55	
5	Győr	30	16	6	8	44	32	+12	54	

Source: rsssf.com
(C) Champions

==== Results summary ====
Overall								Home						Away					
Pld	W	D	L	GF	GA	GD	Pts	W	D	L	GF	GA	GD	W	D	L	GF	GA	GD
30	17	5	8	56	31	+25	56	9	4	2	33	10	+23	8	1	6	23	21	+2

Last updated: 26 May 2005.
Source: NB I

==== Results by round ====
Round	1	2	3	4	5	6	7	8	9	10	11	12	13	14	15	16	17	18	19	20	21	22	23	24	25	26	27	28	29	30
Ground	A	H	A	H	A	H	A	H	A	H	A	A	H	A	H	H	A	H	A	H	A	H	A	H	A	H	H	A	H	A
Result	W	W	W	W	L	W	W	W	D	W	W	L	D	W	W	L	W	L	L	D	L	W	L	D	W	W	D	L	W	W
Position	2	1	1	1	1	1	1	1	1	1	1	1	1	1	1	1	1	1	2	2	2	2	2	2	2	2	2	3	2	2

Updated to match(es) played on 26 May 2005. Source: Matches
A = Away; H = Home; W = Win; D = Draw; L = Loss

==== Matches ====
8 August 2004 1	Győr	2–4	Ferencváros	Győr
11:30 CEST	Horváth 42'; Priskin 65'; Pomper (red card) 90+1'	Report	Vágner 5', 8'; Lipcsei 28'; Huszti 31' (red card) 90+1'	Stadium: Stadion ETO; Attendance: 4,000; Referee: János Makai

14 August 2004 2	Ferencváros	2–1	Diósgyőr	Budapest
20:00 CEST	Vágner 32'; Tőzsér 80'	Report	Tisza 73'	Stadium: Üllői úti stadion Attendance: 5,907; Referee: Csaba Sápi

21 August 2004 3	Videoton	0–1	Ferencváros	Székesfehérvár
20:00 CEST		Report	Bajevski 70'	Stadium: Sóstói Stadion; Attendance: 3,500; Referee: Attila Ábrahám

29 August 2004 4	Ferencváros	2–1	MTK Budapest	Budapest
11:30 CEST	Vágner 12'; Rósa 76'	Report	Füzi 61'	Stadium: Üllői úti stadion Attendance: 4,883; Referee: Zsolt Szabó

11 September 2004 5	Kaposvár	2–1	Ferencváros	Kaposvár
18:00 CEST	Tóth 45'; Oláh 50'	Report	Rósa 58' (pen.)	Stadium: Rákóczi Stadion; Attendance: 7,000; Referee: Attila Dubraviczky

19 September 2004 6	Ferencváros	5–0	Nyíregyháza	Budapest
20:00 CEST	Zavadszky 9', 52'; Bajevski 20'; Penksa 56'; Sowunmi 75'	Report		Stadium: Üllői úti stadion Attendance: 4,500; Referee: Mihály Fábián

26 September 2004 7	Vasas	0–1	Ferencváros	Budapest
11:30 CEST		Report	Rósa 75' (pen.); Kapič (red card) 80'	Stadium: Illovszky Rudolf Stadion; Attendance: 4,300; Referee: Ferenc Bede

3 October 2004 8	Ferencváros	4–1	Sopron	Budapest
11:30 CEST	Vágner 31'; Bajevski 33'; Szűcs 70' (pen.); Sowunmi 80'	Report	Debnár 49'; Földvári (yellow card) 57' (yellow-red card) 64'	Stadium: Üllői úti stadion Attendance: 4,600; Referee: János Makai

17 October 2004 9	Újpest	1–1	Ferencváros	Budapest
11:30 CEST	Rajczi 49'	Report	Botiș 42'	Stadium: Megyeri uti Stadium; Attendance: 4,520; Referee: Zsolt Szabó

23 October 2004 10	Ferencváros	5–0	Pápa	Budapest
17:00 CEST	Sowunmi 9'; Gyepes 42'; Bajevski 55', 71'; Szűcs 59' (pen.)	Report		Stadium: Üllői úti stadion Attendance: 5,500; Referee: Tamás Arany

31 October 2004 11	Békéscsaba	0–3	Ferencváros	Békéscsaba
11:30 CET		Report	Grujić 26' (o.g.); Huszti 77'; Sowunmi 82'	Stadium: Kórház utcai Stadion; Attendance: 6,880; Referee: Zoltán Szarka

7 November 2004 12	Debrecen	2–0	Ferencváros	Debrecen
11:30 CET	Bogdanović 15', 90+1'	Report		Stadium: Oláh Gábor utcai Stadion; Attendance: 7,650; Referee: Attila Ábrahám

10 November 2004 13	Ferencváros	1–1	Pécs	Budapest
18:00 CET	Gyepes 5'	Report	Baumgartner 84'	Stadium: Üllői úti stadion Attendance: 3,576; Referee: Mihály Fábián

20 November 2004 14	Zalaegerszeg	1–5	Ferencváros	Zalaegerszeg
18:00 CET	Ljubojević 76'	Report	Rósa 10'; Bajevski 59'; Lipcsei 71'; Szűcs 75' (pen.); Penksa 82'	Stadium: ZTE Arena; Attendance: 12,260; Referee: Viktor Kassai

28 November 2004 15	Ferencváros	4–0	Budapest Honvéd	Budapest
18:00 CET	Zavadszky 15'; Gyepes 19' (pen.); Sowunmi 67'; Vágner 75'	Report		Stadium: Üllői úti stadion Attendance: 6,598; Referee: Attila Dubraviczky

13 March 2005 16	Ferencváros	0–1	Győr	Budapest
11:30 CET		Report	Jäkl 87'	Stadium: Üllői úti stadion Attendance: 5,763; Referee: Zoltán Szarka

16 March 2005 17	Diósgyőr	2–3	Ferencváros	Miskolc
18:00 CET	Siminic 18'; Mogyoródi 39'	Report	Sowunmi 1'; Rósa 70'; Bajevski 84'	Stadium: DVTK Stadion; Attendance: 15,000; Referee: János Megyebíró

19 March 2005 18	Ferencváros	0–1	Fehérvár	Budapest
18:00 CET		Report	Kuttor 70'	Stadium: Üllői úti stadion Attendance: 5,590; Referee: Viktor Kassai

3 April 2005 19	MTK Budapest	3–1	Ferencváros	Budapest
10:50 CEST	Bori 80', 82'; Pollák 90'	Report	Bajevski 78'	Stadium: Hidegkuti Nándor Stadion; Attendance: 3,000; Referee: Attila Dubraviczky

9 April 2005 20	Ferencváros	1–1	Kaposvár	Budapest
18:00 CEST	Rósa 90+2'	Report	Petrók 7'	Stadium: Üllői úti stadion Attendance: 3,300; Referee: Csaba Sápi

13 April 2005 21	Nyíregyháza	2–0	Ferencváros	Nyíregyháza
16:30 CEST	Némedi 13'; Nikolić 67'	Report		Stadium: Városi Stadion; Attendance: 7,000; Referee: Attila Ábrahám

16 April 2005 22	Ferencváros	2–0	Vasas	Budapest
11:30 CEST	Győri 49' (o.g.); Gyepes 69'	Report		Stadium: Üllői úti stadion Attendance: 4,782; Referee: Ferenc Bede

24 April 2005 23	Sopron	3–0	Ferencváros	Sopron
11:20 CEST	Csordás 39'; Szűcs 79' (o.g.); Bárányos 90+1'	Report		Stadium: Káposztás utcai Stadion; Attendance: 5,200; Referee: Attila Ábrahám

27 April 2005 24	Ferencváros	1–1	Újpest	Budapest
18:00 CEST	Rósa 54'; Lipcsei (red card) 59'	Report	Tóth 69'	Stadium: Üllői úti stadion Attendance: 8,300; Referee: János Megyebíró

30 April 2005 25	Pápa	1–2	Ferencváros	Pápa
17:30 CEST	Medveď 19' (pen.)	Report	Huszti 67'; Nógrádi 70'	Stadium: Perutz Stadion; Attendance: 4,300; Referee: Zsolt Szabó

4 May 2005 26	Ferencváros	2–0	Békéscsaba	Budapest
18:00 CEST	Bartha 4'; Bajevski 90'	Report		Stadium: Üllői úti stadion Attendance: 3,600; Referee: Mihály Fábián

8 May 2005 27	Ferencváros	0–0	Debrecen	Budapest
11:30 CEST		Report		Stadium: Üllői úti stadion Attendance: 7,298; Referee: Viktor Kassai

15 May 2005 28	Pécs	2–0	Ferencváros	Pécs
11:20 CEST	Lipcsei 14' (o.g.); Horváth 90'	Report		Stadium: Stadion PMFC; Attendance: 6,500; Referee: Tamás Arany

21 May 2005 29	Ferencváros	4–2	Zalaegerszeg	Budapest
18:00 CEST	Bajevski 4'; Rósa 14'; Gyepes 32' (pen.); Bartha 41'	Report	Sabo 8', 39'	Stadium: Üllői úti stadion Attendance: 4,877; Referee: Péter Solymosi

26 May 2005 30	Budapest Honvéd	0–1	Ferencváros	Budapest
18:00 CEST	Szili (yellow card) 64' (yellow-red card) 73'	Report	Sowunmi 87'	Stadium: Bozsik József Stadion; Attendance: 4,800; Referee: János Megyebíró

=== Hungarian Cup ===
27 October 2004 Round of 32	Dabas	0–4	Ferencváros	Dabas
CET		Report	Tőzsér 33'; Sowunmi 44'; Zavadszky 61', 86'	Stadium: Wellis Sportpark; Attendance: 2,000; Referee: Attila Hanacsek

8 December 2004 Round of 16	Pécs	1–3	Ferencváros	Pécs
CET	Sipos 68'	Report	Rósa 18', 49' (pen.); Penksa 78'	Stadium: Stadion PMFC; Attendance: 4,000; Referee: János Megyebíró

6 April 2005 Quarter-final	Ferencváros	3–1	Kaposvár	Budapest
CEST	Rósa 26', 90'; Sowunmi 64'	Report	Maróti 42'	Stadium: Üllői úti stadion Attendance: 2,290; Referee: Mihály Fábián

20 April 2005 Semi-final	BKV Előre	1–3	Ferencváros	Budapest
CEST	Lendvai 84'	Report	Sowunmi 7'; Huszti 59', 75'	Stadium: Sport utcai Stadion; Attendance: 2,000; Referee: Attila Durbaviczky

11 May 2005 Final	Ferencváros	1–5	Sopron	Székesfehérvár
20:00 CEST	Rósa (red card) 38'; Szűcs (red card) 45+1'; Lipcsei 49'; Kapič (yellow card) 56' (yellow-red card) 68'	Report	Tóth 13'; Bárányos 38'; Balaskó 45' (pen.), 57'; Horváth 73'; Pintér (yellow card) 47' (yellow-red card) 79'	Stadium: Sóstói Stadion; Attendance: 4,000; Referee: Edo Trivković (Croatia)

=== UEFA Champions League ===
27 July 2004 Q2 Leg1	Tirana (Albania)	2–3	(Hungary) Ferencváros	Qemal Stafa Stadium, Tirana
18:00	Muka 58', 68'	Report	Huszti 42' (pen.), 90+3'; Hajdari 89' (o.g.)	Attendance: 3,000; Referee: Bülent Demirlek (Turkey)

4 August 2004 Q2 Leg2	Ferencváros (Hungary)	0–1 ((a)3–3 agg.)	(Albania) Tirana	Üllői úti stadion, Budapest
20:00		Report	Muka 13'	Attendance: 8,000; Referee: Charlie Richmond (Scotland)

11 August 2004 Q3 Leg1	Ferencváros (Hungary)	1–0	(Czech Republic) Sparta Prague	Üllői úti stadion, Budapest
20:00	Vágner 26'	Report		Attendance: 10,000; Referee: Florian Meyer (Germany)

25 August 2004 Q3 Leg2	Sparta Prague (Czech Republic)	2–0 (a.e.t.) (2–1 agg.)	(Hungary) Ferencváros	Stadion Letná, Prague
20:05	Zelenka 45+3'; Homola 114'	Report		Attendance: 18,000; Referee: Urs Meier (Switzerland)

=== UEFA Cup ===
16 September 2004 R1 Leg1	Millwall (England)	1–1	(Hungary) Ferencváros	The Den, London
20:45	Wise 66'	Report	Lipcsei 79'	Attendance: 11,667; Referee: Dejan Delević (Serbia and Montenegro)

30 September 2004 R1 Leg2	Ferencváros (Hungary)	3–1 (4–2 agg.)	(England) Millwall	Üllői úti stadion, Budapest
21:00	Rósa 26'; Botiș 32'; Vágner 42'	Report	Wise 45+1'	Attendance: 15,229; Referee: Eric Braamhaar (Netherlands)

==== Group stage ====
Pos	Team	Pld	W	D	L	GF	GA	GD	Pts	Qualification	FEY	SCH	BSL	FER	HOM
1	(Netherlands) Feyenoord	4	2	1	1	6	3	+3	7	Advance to knockout stage	—	2–1	—	—	3–0
2	(Germany) Schalke 04	4	2	1	1	5	3	+2	7	Advance to knockout stage	—	—	1–1	2–0	—
3	(Switzerland) Basel	4	2	1	1	5	4	+1	7	Advance to knockout stage	1–0	—	—	—	1–2
4	(Hungary) Ferencváros	4	1	1	2	3	5	−2	4		1–1	—	1–2	—	—
5	(Scotland) Heart of Midlothian	4	1	0	3	2	6	−4	3		—	0–1	—	0–1	—

Source: RSSSF

4 November 2004 1	Ferencváros (Hungary)	1–1	(Netherlands) Feyenoord	Budapest, Hungary
20:45 CET	Tőzsér 27'	Report	Kalou 62'	Stadium: Puskás Ferenc Stadion; Attendance: 26,000; Referee: Darko Čeferin (Slovenia)

25 November 2004 2	Schalke 04 (Germany)	2–0	(Hungary) Ferencváros	Gelsenkirchen, Germany
18:15 CET	Gyepes 16' (o.g.); Kobiashvili 40'	Report		Stadium: Arena AufSchalke; Attendance: 51,179; Referee: Claude Colombo (France)

1 December 2004 3	Ferencváros (Hungary)	1–2	(Switzerland) Basel	Budapest, Hungary
20:45 CET	Rósa 22'	Report	Rossi 59'; Huggel 78'	Stadium: Puskás Ferenc Stadion; Attendance: 15,000; Referee: Vitaliy Godulyan (Ukraine)

16 December 2004 4	Heart of Midlothian (Scotland)	2–0	(Hungary) Ferencváros	Edinburgh, Scotland
19:45 CET		Report	Rósa 30'	Stadium: Murrayfield Stadium; Attendance: 26,180; Referee: Levan Paniashvili (Georgia)

=== Appearances and goals ===
Last updated on 26 May 2005.

No.	Pos	Nat	Player	Total		Nemzeti Bajnokság I		UEFA CL/UEFA Cup		Hungarian Cup	
No.	Pos	Nat	Player	Apps	Goals	Apps	Goals	Apps	Goals	Apps	Goals
1	GK	(Hungary) HUN	Milán Udvarácz	3	-3	0	-0	0	-0	3	-3
3	DF	(Hungary) HUN	Ákos Takács	15	0	11	0	1	0	3	0
5	MF	(Slovakia) SVK	Igor Szkukalek	1	0	0	0	0	0	1	0
6	MF	(Hungary) HUN	Péter Lipcsei	38	4	24	2	9	1	5	1
8	FW	(Hungary) HUN	Árpád Nógrádi	5	1	3	1	1	0	1	0
9	FW	(North Macedonia) MKD	Aleksandar Bajevski	39	10	28	10	8	0	3	0
11	MF	(Hungary) HUN	Szabolcs Huszti	34	7	23	3	8	2	3	2
15	FW	(Hungary) HUN	László Bartha	11	2	9	2	0	0	2	0
17	FW	(Romania) ROU	Marius Sasu	10	0	7	0	2	0	1	0
20	MF	(Hungary) HUN	Dénes Rósa	41	15	27	8	9	3	5	4
21	DF	(Serbia and Montenegro) SCG	Dragan Vukmir	40	0	28	0	9	0	3	0
22	GK	(Hungary) HUN	Lajos Szűcs	43	-47	30	-30	10	-12	3	-5
23	DF	(Romania) ROU	Sorin Botiș	27	2	18	1	5	1	4	0
24	DF	(Hungary) HUN	Gábor Gyepes	39	5	26	5	10	0	3	0
27	MF	(Hungary) HUN	Richárd Csepregi	5	0	3	0	0	0	2	0
28	FW	(Czech Republic) CZE	Robert Vágner	28	8	20	6	7	2	1	0
53	MF	(Slovenia) SLO	Adem Kapič	24	0	14	0	7	0	3	0
78	DF	(Hungary) HUN	Zoltán Balog	28	0	17	0	7	0	4	0
79	DF	(Hungary) HUN	Zsolt Bognár	9	0	8	0	0	0	1	0
88	MF	(Hungary) HUN	Dániel Tőzsér	37	3	27	1	7	1	3	1
90	FW	(Hungary) HUN	Thomas Sowunmi	34	10	22	7	7	0	5	3
99	FW	(Slovakia) SVK	Marek Penksa	35	3	22	2	10	0	3	1
Youth players:
80	GK	(Hungary) HUN	Krisztián Berki	0	0	0	-0	0	-0	0	-0
86	MF	(Hungary) HUN	Zsolt Laczkó	1	0	1	0	0	0	0	0
	DF	(Hungary) HUN	János Béress	1	0	1	0	0	0	0	0
	FW	(Hungary) HUN	Dávid Horváth	1	0	1	0	0	0	0	0
	DF	(Hungary) HUN	Zoltán Csurka	1	0	1	0	0	0	0	0
Out to loan:
35	GK	(Hungary) HUN	Kálmán Szabó	0	0	0	-0	0	-0	0	-0
Players no longer at the club:
4	DF	(Hungary) HUN	György Kiss	8	0	6	0	1	0	1	0
7	MF	(Hungary) HUN	Gábor Zavadszky	21	5	12	3	7	0	2	2
10	FW	(Hungary) HUN	Leandro	19	0	11	0	7	0	1	0
13	MF	(Hungary) HUN	Tamás Somorjai	5	0	4	0	0	0	1	0
30	MF	(Hungary) HUN	Zoltán Gera	1	0	0	0	1	0	0	0
51	MF	(Hungary) HUN	János Zováth	15	0	9	0	5	0	1	0

=== Top scorers ===
Includes all competitive matches. The list is sorted by shirt number when total goals are equal.

Last updated on 26 May 2005

Position	Nation	Number	Name	OTP Bank Liga	UEFA CL/UEFA Cup	Hungarian Cup	Total
1	(Hungary)	20	Dénes Rósa	8	3	4	15
2	(North Macedonia)	9	Aleksandar Bajevski	10	0	0	10
3	(Hungary)	90	Thomas Sowunmi	7	0	3	10
4	(Czech Republic)	28	Robert Vágner	6	2	0	8
5	(Hungary)	11	Szabolcs Huszti	3	2	2	7
6	(Hungary)	24	Gábor Gyepes	5	0	0	5
7	(Hungary)	7	Gábor Zavadszky	3	0	2	5
8	(Hungary)	6	Péter Lipcsei	2	1	1	4
9	(Hungary)	22	Lajos Szűcs	3	0	0	3
10	(Hungary)	88	Dániel Tőzsér	1	1	1	3
11	(Slovakia)	99	Marek Penksa	2	0	1	3
12	(Romania)	23	Sorin Botiș	1	1	0	2
13	(Hungary)	15	László Bartha	2	0	0	2
14	(Hungary)	8	Árpád Nógrádi	1	0	0	1
/	/	/	Own Goals	2	1	0	3
			TOTALS	56	11	14	81

=== Disciplinary record ===
Includes all competitive matches. Players with 1 card or more included only.

Last updated on 26 May 2005

Position	Nation	Number	Name	OTP Bank Liga		UEFA CL/UEFA Cup		Hungarian Cup		Total (Hu Total)	
Position	Nation	Number	Name	Yellow card	Red card	Yellow card	Red card	Yellow card	Red card	Yellow card	Red card
DF	(Hungary)	3	Ákos Takács	1	0	0	0	1	0	2 (1)	0 (0)
MF	(Hungary)	6	Péter Lipcsei	4	1	3	0	1	0	8 (4)	1 (1)
MF	(Hungary)	7	Gábor Zavadszky	0	0	2	0	0	0	2 (0)	0 (0)
FW	(North Macedonia)	9	Aleksandar Bajevski	1	0	1	0	0	0	2 (1)	0 (0)
FW	(Hungary)	10	Leandro	0	0	1	0	1	0	2 (0)	0 (0)
MF	(Hungary)	11	Szabolcs Huszti	5	1	5	0	0	0	10 (5)	1 (1)
FW	(Romania)	17	Marius Sasu	2	0	0	0	0	0	2 (2)	0 (0)
MF	(Hungary)	20	Dénes Rósa	3	0	2	0	0	1	5 (3)	1 (0)
DF	(Serbia and Montenegro)	21	Dragan Vukmir	3	0	2	0	1	0	6 (3)	0 (0)
GK	(Hungary)	22	Lajos Szűcs	0	0	1	0	0	1	1 (0)	1 (0)
DF	(Romania)	23	Sorin Botiș	4	0	2	0	0	0	6 (4)	0 (0)
DF	(Hungary)	24	Gábor Gyepes	8	0	2	0	0	0	10 (8)	0 (0)
FW	(Czech Republic)	28	Robert Vágner	4	0	2	0	0	0	6 (4)	0 (0)
MF	(Hungary)	51	János Zováth	1	0	1	0	0	0	2 (1)	0 (0)
MF	(Slovenia)	53	Adem Kapič	5	1	4	0	2	1	11 (5)	2 (1)
DF	(Hungary)	78	Zoltán Balog	4	0	1	0	0	0	5 (4)	0 (0)
DF	(Hungary)	79	Zsolt Bognár	1	0	0	0	0	0	1 (1)	0 (0)
MF	(Hungary)	88	Dániel Tőzsér	1	0	1	0	0	0	2 (1)	0 (0)
FW	(Hungary)	90	Thomas Sowunmi	3	0	0	0	1	0	4 (3)	0 (0)
FW	(Slovakia)	99	Marek Penksa	1	0	0	0	0	0	1 (1)	0 (0)
			TOTALS	51	3	30	0	7	3	88 (51)	6 (3)

=== Clean sheets ===
Last updated on 26 May 2005

Position	Nation	Number	Name	OTP Bank Liga	UEFA CL/UEFA Cup	Hungarian Cup	Total
1	(Hungary)	22	Lajos Szűcs	10	2	0	12
2	(Hungary)	1	Milán Udvarácz	0	0	1	1
3	(Hungary)	80	Krisztián Berki	0	0	0	0
			TOTALS	10	2	1	13
