= 2005–06 Ferencvárosi TC season =

Ferencvárosi TC
2005–06 season
- Chairman: János Furulyás
- Manager: Csaba László
- Stadium: Üllői úti stadion
- Hungarian Cup: Dissolved

The 2005–06 season will be Ferencvárosi TC's104th competitive season, 104th consecutive season in the Borsodi Liga and 106th year in existence as a football club. Ferencváros banned from 2005-06 Hungarian Cup following incidents in 2004/05 final.

== Squad ==
As of match played 21 July 2006

No.	Name	Nationality	Position	Date of birth (age)	Signed from	Signed in	Apps.	Goals
Goalkeepers
1	Milán Udvarácz	(Hungary)	GK	9 December 1967 (aged 38)	Kispest-Honvéd	2002	59	0
12	Szabolcs Kemenes	(Hungary)	GK	18 May 1986 (aged 20)	Charlton Athletic	2005	15	0
22	Lajos Szűcs	(Hungary)	GK	8 August 1973 (aged 32)	Kaiserslautern	2000	200	4
Defenders
3	Ákos Takács	(Hungary)	DF	14 February 1982 (aged 24)	youth sector	2003	24	0
4	József Keller	(Hungary)	DF	25 September 1965 (aged 40)	Budapest Honvéd	2004	325	6
5	Krisztián Timár	(Hungary)	DF	4 October 1979 (aged 26)	Nyíregyháza	2005	23	3
13	Zoltán Csurka	(Hungary)	DF	11 August 1984 (aged 21)	youth sector	2005	6	0
16	Zsolt Szálkai	(Hungary)	DF	18 July 1985 (aged 20)	youth sector	2005	5	0
17	Krisztián Budovinszky	(Hungary)	DF	18 April 1976 (aged 30)	Budapest Honvéd	2005	15	1
23	Sorin Botiș	(Romania)	DF	14 April 1978 (aged 28)	Sheriff Tiraspol	2003	51	3
78	Zoltán Balog	(Hungary)	DF	22 February 1978 (aged 28)	Cegléd	2000	110	2
79	Zsolt Bognár	(Hungary)	DF	28 March 1979 (aged 27)	Győr	2002	59	1
TBA	János Béress	(Hungary)	DF	28 September 1985 (aged 20)	youth sector	2005	2	0
Midfielders
6	Péter Lipcsei	(Hungary)	MF	28 March 1972 (aged 34)	Austria Salzburg	2000	335	77
8	Bojan Lazić	(Serbia and Montenegro)	MF	13 May 1974 (aged 32)	Sopron	2005	10	0
10	Leandro	(Hungary)	FW	19 March 1982 (aged 24)	Szombathelyi Haladás	2002	85	7
11	Gábor Erős	(Hungary)	MF	1 July 1980 (aged 25)	Pécs	2005	13	0
14	Tamás Szalai	(Hungary)	MF	12 June 1984 (aged 21)	youth sector	2003	19	1
18	Zsolt Laczkó	(Hungary)	MF	18 December 1986 (aged 19)	youth sector	2005	29	3
20	Dénes Rósa	(Hungary)	MF	7 April 1977 (aged 29)	Újpest	2003	66	13
27	Richárd Csepregi	(Hungary)	MF	27 July 1985 (aged 20)	youth sector	2005	19	0
87	László Fitos	(Hungary)	MF	27 February 1987 (aged 19)	youth sector	2005	12	0
88	Dániel Tőzsér	(Hungary)	MF	12 May 1985 (aged 21)	Galatasaray	2004	54	3
TBA	László Brettschneider	(Hungary)	DF	22 January 1985 (aged 21)	youth sector	2005	1	0
Forwards
8	Árpád Nógrádi	(Hungary)	FW	14 March 1983 (aged 23)	youth sector	2003	11	2
9	Aleksandar Bajevski	(North Macedonia)	FW	8 December 1979 (aged 26)	Siófok	2004	49	15
15	László Bartha	(Hungary)	FW	9 February 1987 (aged 19)	youth sector	2005	22	2
33	Csaba Borbély	(Hungary)	FW	5 July 1980 (aged 25)	Universitatea Craiova	2005	5	0
42	Zoltán Jovánczai	(Hungary)	FW	8 December 1984 (aged 21)	Kaposvár	2005	27	11
TBA	Dávid Horváth	(Hungary)	FW	1 February 1985 (aged 21)	youth sector	2005	4	0
Players away on loan
Players who left during the season

== Transfers ==
=== Summer ===
In: Note: Flags indicate national team as defined under FIFA eligibility rules; some limited exceptions apply. Players may hold more than one non-FIFA nationality.

No.	Pos.	Nation	Player
5	DF	HUN	Krisztián Timár (from Nyíregyháza)
11	MF	HUN	Gábor Erős (from Pécs)
12	GK	HUN	Szabolcs Kemenes (loan from (England) Charlton Athletic)
15	FW	HUN	László Bartha (from youth sector)
17	DF	HUN	Krisztián Budovinszky (from Budapest Honvéd)
18	DF	HUN	Zsolt Laczkó (from youth sector)
33	FW	HUN	Csaba Borbély (from (Romania) Universitatea Craiova)
42	FW	HUN	Zoltán Jovánczai (from Kaposvár)
87	MF	HUN	László Fitos (from youth sector)

Out: Note: Flags indicate national team as defined under FIFA eligibility rules; some limited exceptions apply. Players may hold more than one non-FIFA nationality.

No.	Pos.	Nation	Player
5	MF	SVK	Igor Szkukalek (to Pápa)
11	MF	HUN	Szabolcs Huszti (to (France) Metz)
17	FW	ROU	Marius Sasu (to (Greece) Panserraikos)
21	DF	SCG	Dragan Vukmir (to Debrecen)
24	DF	HUN	Gábor Gyepes (to (England) Wolverhampton Wanderers)
28	FW	CZE	Robert Vágner (to (Czech Republic) Viktoria Plzeň)
53	MF	SVN	Adem Kapič (to (Israel) Beitar Jerusalem)
80	GK	HUN	Krisztián Berki (to Diósgyőr)
90	FW	HUN	Thomas Sowunmi (to (Czech Republic) Slovácko)
99	MF	SVK	Marek Penksa (to (Poland) Wisła Kraków)

=== Winter ===
In: Note: Flags indicate national team as defined under FIFA eligibility rules; some limited exceptions apply. Players may hold more than one non-FIFA nationality.

No.	Pos.	Nation	Player
8	MF	SCG	Bojan Lazić (from Sopron)
10	MF	HUN	Leandro (from (Brazil) Atlético Paranaense)ű
21	MF	HUN	Norbert Zsivóczky (from (England) Stoke City)
35	GK	HUN	Kálmán Szabó (loan return from Tatabánya)

Out: Note: Flags indicate national team as defined under FIFA eligibility rules; some limited exceptions apply. Players may hold more than one non-FIFA nationality.

No.	Pos.	Nation	Player
8	FW	HUN	Árpád Nógrádi (loan to Paks)
13	DF	HUN	Zoltán Csurka (loan to Felcsút)
20	MF	HUN	Dénes Rósa (to (England) Wolverhampton Wanderers)
22	GK	HUN	Lajos Szűcs (to Pápa)
33	FW	HUN	Csaba Borbély (to (Romania) Vaslui)
—	DF	HUN	János Béress (loan to Budafok)

== Competitions ==
=== Overview ===
Competition	First match	Last match	Starting round	Final position	Record							
Competition	First match	Last match	Starting round	Final position	Pld	W	D	L	GF	GA	GD	Win %
Nemzeti Bajnokság I	31 July 2005	2 June 2006	Matchday 1	TBA	30	10	11	9	43	38	+5	33.33
UEFA Cup	14 July 2005	28 July 2005	First qualifying round	First qualifying round	2	1	0	1	2	3	−1	50.00
Total					32	11	11	10	45	41	+4	34.38

Last updated: 3 June 2006
Source: Competitions

=== Nemzeti Bajnokság I ===
==== League table ====
Pos	Team	Pld	W	D	L	GF	GA	GD	Pts	Qualification or relegation
4	MTK	30	18	6	6	65	33	+32	60	
5	Tatabánya	30	11	8	11	46	45	+1	41	
6	Ferencváros (R)	30	10	11	9	43	38	+5	41	Relegated to Nemzeti Bajnokság II (Note: Ferencvárosi TC were relegated to the Nemzeti Bajnokság II because the club failed to comply with UEFA licensing rules.)
7	Kaposvár	30	10	7	13	35	41	−6	37	
8	Diósgyőr	30	10	7	13	33	44	−11	37	

Source: RSSSF
(R) Relegated

==== Results summary ====
Overall								Home						Away					
Pld	W	D	L	GF	GA	GD	Pts	W	D	L	GF	GA	GD	W	D	L	GF	GA	GD
30	10	11	9	43	38	+5	41	6	5	4	23	18	+5	4	6	5	20	20	0

Last updated: 3 June 2006.
Source: NB I

==== Results by round ====
Round	1	2	3	4	5	6	7	8	9	10	11	12	13	14	15	16	17	18	19	20	21	22	23	24	25	26	27	28	29	30
Ground	H	A	H	A	H	A	H	A	H	A	H	A	H	A	H	A	H	A	H	A	H	A	H	A	H	A	H	A	H	A
Result	L	L	D	L	D	D	W	L	D	W	L	D	D	W	W	D	W	W	D	D	W	D	L	W	W	L	W	L	L	D
Position	16	16	15	15	15	14	13	13	13	11	12	12	12	11	9	11	10	6	7	6	5	5	6	5	5	5	5	5	5	6

Updated to match(es) played on 3 June 2006. Source: Matches
A = Away; H = Home; W = Win; D = Draw; L = Loss

==== Matches ====
31 July 2005 1	Ferencváros	0–1	Fehérvár	Budapest
20:00 CEST		Report	Györök 37'	Stadium: Üllői úti stadion Attendance: 3,000; Referee: Mihály Fábián

7 August 2005 2	Budapest Honvéd	3–1	Ferencváros	Budapest
11:30 CEST	Alves 9', 37', 59'	Report	Timár 69'	Stadium: Bozsik József Stadion; Attendance: 2,340; Referee: Ferenc Bede

21 August 2005 3	Ferencváros	3–3	Pápa	Budapest
11:30 CEST	Jovánczai 6'; Mutică 40' (o.g.); Rósa 41'	Report	Róth 48', 67' (pen.), 73'	Stadium: Üllői úti stadion Attendance: 1,586; Referee: Tamás Arany

27 August 2005 4	Zalaegerszeg	3–2	Ferencváros	Zalaegerszeg
19:00 CEST	Csóka 8'; Koplárovics 14'; Kriston 24'	Report	Lipcsei 9'; Budovinszky 75'	Stadium: ZTE Arena; Attendance: 9,000; Referee: Péter Solymosi

17 September 2005 5	Ferencváros	1–1	Kaposvár	Budapest
19:00 CEST	Laczkó 62'; Balog (yellow card) 67' (yellow-red card) 90'	Report	Nagypál 16'	Stadium: Üllői úti stadion Attendance: 4,666; Referee: Csaba Sápi

25 September 2005 6	MTK Budapest	2–2	Ferencváros	Budapest
11:30 CEST	Hrepka 57'; Kanta 58' (pen.)	Report	Tőzsér 39'; Rósa 40' (pen.)	Stadium: Hidegkuti Nándor Stadion; Attendance: 3,500; Referee: Zsolt Szabó

2 October 2005 7	Ferencváros	2–0	Győr	Budapest
11:30 CEST	Nógrádi 67'; Laczkó 90+1'	Report		Stadium: Üllői úti stadion Attendance: 1,500; Referee: Viktor Kassai

16 October 2005 8	Újpest	2–1	Ferencváros	Budapest
11:30 CEST	Vermes 79'; Kovács 90+1'	Report	Böjte 31' (o.g.)	Stadium: Szusza Ferenc Stadion; Attendance: 8,000; Referee: János Megyebíró

21 October 2005 9	Ferencváros	1–1	Diósgyőr	Budapest
18:00 CEST	Jovánczai 67'	Report	Tisza 84'	Stadium: Üllői úti stadion Attendance: 3,600; Referee: Péter Solymosi

29 October 2005 10	Vasas	0–1	Ferencváros	Budapest
18:00 CET		Report	Rósa 47' (pen.); Lipcsei (red card) 85'	Stadium: Illovszky Rudolf Stadion; Attendance: 5,000; Referee: Ferenc Bede

5 November 2005 11	Ferencváros	0–2	Rákospalota	Budapest
18:00 CET	Timár (yellow card) 17' (yellow-red card) 76'	Report	Török 58'; Torma 78'	Stadium: Üllői úti stadion Attendance: 2,580; Referee: Csaba Sápi

19 November 2005 12	Pécs	0–0	Ferencváros	Pécs
17:00 CET		Report		Stadium: Stadion PMFC; Attendance: 4,000; Referee: Sándor Gergely

27 November 2005 13	Ferencváros	0–0	Debrecen	Budapest
11:30 CET		Report		Stadium: Üllői úti stadion Attendance: 4,000; Referee: Viktor Kassai

4 December 2005 14	Tatabánya	2–3	Ferencváros	Tatabánya
13:30 CET	Deme 33'; Márkus 60'	Report	Timár 14'; Jovánczai 68'; Szalai 82'	Stadium: Városi Stadion; Attendance: 5,300; Referee: Péter Solymosi

10 December 2005 15	Ferencváros	1–0	Sopron	Budapest
15:00 CET	Balog 90+2'	Report		Stadium: Üllői úti stadion Attendance: 2,500; Referee: Mihály Fábián

26 February 2006 16	Fehérvár	1–1	Ferencváros	Székesfehérvár
11:30 CET	Csizmadia (yellow card) 20' (yellow-red card) 59'; Lattenstein 86'	Report	Timár 81'	Stadium: Sóstói Stadion; Attendance: 4,200; Referee: János Megyebíró

12 April 2006 17	Ferencváros	3–1	Budapest Honvéd	Budapest
19:00 CEST	Jovánczai 27'; Balog 41'; Lipcsei 67' (pen.)	Report	Schranz 45'	Stadium: Üllői úti stadion Attendance: 3,000; Referee: Zsolt Szabó

10 March 2006 18	Pápa	1–5	Ferencváros	Pápa
19:00 CET	Simpson 28'; Varga (yellow card) 52' (yellow-red card) 76'	Report	Laczkó 63'; Bajevski 68'; Lipcsei 71' (pen.); Jovánczai 82', 84'	Stadium: Perutz Stadion; Attendance: 2,500; Referee: János Makai

17 March 2006 19	Ferencváros	2–2	Zalaegerszeg	Budapest
19:00 CET	Jovánczai 17' (pen.), 60' (pen.)	Report	V. Sebők 21' (pen.); Perić 59'	Stadium: Üllői úti stadion Attendance: 4,297; Referee: Mihály Fábián

25 March 2006 20	Kaposvár	0–0	Ferencváros	Kaposvár
15:00 CET		Report	Lazić (red card) 48'	Stadium: Rákóczi Stadion; Attendance: 5,500; Referee: Szabolcs Saskőy

2 April 2006 21	Ferencváros	1–0	MTK Budapest	Budapest
11:30 CEST	Lipcsei 81' (pen.)	Report		Stadium: Üllői úti stadion Attendance: 4,779; Referee: Viktor Kassai

9 April 2006 22	Győr	1–1	Ferencváros	Győr
11:30 CEST	Bajzát 89'	Report	Tőzsér 47'	Stadium: ETO Park; Attendance: 2,000; Referee: Tamás Arany

16 April 2006 23	Ferencváros	1–2	Újpest	Budapest
11:30 CEST	Lipcsei 19' (pen.); Botiș (red card) 90+5'	Report	Böjte (yellow card) 44' (yellow-red card) 90'; Kovács 90+3' (red card) 90+7'; Rajczi 90+6' (pen.)	Stadium: Üllői úti stadion Attendance: 8,000; Referee: Szabolcs Saskőy

23 April 2006 24	Diósgyőr	0–1	Ferencváros	Miskolc
11:30 CEST		Report	Bajevski 12'	Stadium: DVTK Stadion; Attendance: 8,500; Referee: József Erdős

29 April 2006 25	Ferencváros	3–1	Vasas	Budapest
15:00 CEST	Bajevski 8'; Botiș 34'; Jovánczai 79'	Report	Rósa 62'	Stadium: Üllői úti stadion Attendance: 4,862; Referee: Csaba Sápi

6 May 2006 26	Rákospalota	1–0	Ferencváros	Budapest
15:00 CEST	Polonkai 69'	Report		Stadium: Budai II. László Stadion; Attendance: 4,000; Referee: Ferenc Bede

12 May 2006 27	Ferencváros	3–1	Pécs	Budapest
19:00 CEST	Jovánczai 12', 28'; Lipcsei 14'	Report	Kulcsár 70'	Stadium: Üllői úti stadion Attendance: 4,065; Referee: Viktor Kassai

21 May 2006 28	Debrecen	3–1	Ferencváros	Debrecen
11:30 CEST	Máté 2'; Dzsudzsák 38'; Sidibe 62' (pen.)	Report	Lipcsei 45' (pen.); Balog (yellow card) 4' (yellow-red card) 26'	Stadium: Oláh Gábor utcai Stadion; Attendance: 11,000; Referee: Péter Solymosi

27 May 2006 29	Ferencváros	2–3	Tatabánya	Budapest
19:00 CEST	Lipcsei 28' (pen.); Bajevski 90'; Tímár (red card) 90+1'	Report	Megyesi 31'; Deme 35', 45'	Stadium: Üllői úti stadion Attendance: 4,500; Referee: Sándor Andó-Szabó

2 June 2006 30	Sopron	1–1	Ferencváros	Sopron
19:00 CEST	Bagoly 54'	Report	Bajevski 14'	Stadium: Káposztás utcai Stadion; Attendance: 2,000; Referee: Tamás Arany

=== UEFA Cup ===
14 July 2005 Q1 Leg1	Ferencváros (Hungary)	0–2	(Belarus) MTZ-RIPO Minsk	Üllői úti stadion, Budapest
20:00		Report	Mkhitaryan 38'; Tarashchyk 90+3'	Attendance: 4,926; Referee: Novo Panić (Bosnia and Herzegovina)

28 July 2005 Q1 Leg2	MTZ-RIPO Minsk (Belarus)	1–2	(Hungary) Ferencváros	Traktor Stadium, Minsk
16:00	Kontsevoy 48'	Report	Lipcsei 45'; Rósa 90'	Attendance: 9,000; Referee: Richard Havrilla (Slovakia)

=== Appearances and goals ===
Last updated on 3 June 2006.

No.	Pos	Nat	Player	Total		Nemzeti Bajnokság I		UEFA Cup		Hungarian Cup	
No.	Pos	Nat	Player	Apps	Goals	Apps	Goals	Apps	Goals	Apps	Goals
1	GK	(Hungary) HUN	Milán Udvarácz	2	-3	0	-0	2	-3	0	-0
3	DF	(Hungary) HUN	Ákos Takács	14	0	12	0	2	0	0	0
5	DF	(Hungary) HUN	Krisztián Timár	24	3	23	3	1	0	0	0
6	MF	(Hungary) HUN	Péter Lipcsei	27	9	26	8	1	1	0	0
8	MF	(Serbia and Montenegro) SCG	Bojan Lazić	10	0	10	0	0	0	0	0
9	FW	(North Macedonia) MKD	Aleksandar Bajevski	23	5	21	5	2	0	0	0
10	MF	(Hungary) HUN	Leandro	15	0	15	0	0	0	0	0
11	MF	(Hungary) HUN	Gábor Erős	14	0	13	0	1	0	0	0
12	GK	(Hungary) HUN	Szabolcs Kemenes	15	-18	15	-18	0	-0	0	-0
14	MF	(Hungary) HUN	Tamás Szalai	18	1	17	1	1	0	0	0
15	FW	(Hungary) HUN	László Bartha	14	0	13	0	1	0	0	0
16	DF	(Hungary) HUN	Zsolt Szálkai	5	0	5	0	0	0	0	0
17	DF	(Hungary) HUN	Krisztián Budovinszky	17	1	15	1	2	0	0	0
18	DF	(Hungary) HUN	Zsolt Laczkó	30	3	28	3	2	0	0	0
19	DF	(Hungary) HUN	Zsolt Bognár	23	0	22	0	1	0	0	0
23	DF	(Romania) ROU	Sorin Botiș	22	1	22	1	0	0	0	0
27	MF	(Hungary) HUN	Richárd Csepregi	17	0	16	0	1	0	0	0
42	FW	(Hungary) HUN	Zoltán Jovánczai	27	11	27	11	0	0	0	0
78	DF	(Hungary) HUN	Zoltán Balog	25	2	23	2	2	0	0	0
87	MF	(Hungary) HUN	László Fitos	12	0	12	0	0	0	0	0
88	MF	(Hungary) HUN	Dániel Tőzsér	29	2	27	2	2	0	0	0
Youth players:
	FW	(Hungary) HUN	Dávid Horváth	3	0	3	0	0	0	0	0
Out to loan:
8	FW	(Hungary) HUN	Árpád Nógrádi	7	1	6	1	1	0	0	0
13	DF	(Hungary) HUN	Zoltán Csurka	6	0	5	0	1	0	0	0
	DF	(Hungary) HUN	János Béress	1	0	1	0	0	0	0	0
	MF	(Hungary) HUN	László Brettschneider	1	0	1	0	0	0	0	0
Players no longer at the club:
4	MF	(Hungary) HUN	József Keller	2	0	1	0	1	0	0	0
20	MF	(Hungary) HUN	Dénes Rósa	16	4	14	3	2	1	0	0
22	GK	(Hungary) HUN	Lajos Szűcs	15	-20	15	-20	0	-0	0	-0
24	DF	(Hungary) HUN	Gábor Gyepes	1	0	0	0	1	0	0	0
26	MF	(Hungary) HUN	Róbert Grósz	1	0	0	0	1	0	0	0
33	FW	(Hungary) HUN	Csaba Borbély	5	0	5	0	0	0	0	0

=== Top scorers ===
Includes all competitive matches. The list is sorted by shirt number when total goals are equal.

Last updated on 3 June 2006

Position	Nation	Number	Name	OTP Bank Liga	UEFA Cup	Hungarian Cup	Total
1	(Hungary)	42	Zoltán Jovánczai	11	0	0	11
2	(Hungary)	6	Péter Lipcsei	8	1	0	9
3	(North Macedonia)	9	Aleksandar Bajevski	5	0	0	5
4	(Hungary)	20	Dénes Rósa	3	1	0	4
5	(Hungary)	5	Krisztián Timár	3	0	0	3
6	(Hungary)	18	Zsolt Laczkó	3	0	0	3
7	(Hungary)	78	Zoltán Balog	2	0	0	2
8	(Hungary)	88	Dániel Tőzsér	2	0	0	2
9	(Hungary)	17	Krisztián Budovinszky	1	0	0	1
10	(Hungary)	8	Árpád Nógrádi	1	0	0	1
11	(Hungary)	14	Tamás Szalai	1	0	0	1
12	(Romania)	23	Sorin Botiș	1	0	0	1
/	/	/	Own Goals	2	0	0	2
			TOTALS	42	2	0	44

=== Disciplinary record ===
Includes all competitive matches. Players with 1 card or more included only.

Last updated on 3 June 2006

Position	Nation	Number	Name	OTP Bank Liga		UEFA Cup		Hungarian Cup		Total (Hu Total)	
Position	Nation	Number	Name	Booked	Sent off (straight red)	Booked	Sent off (straight red)	Booked	Sent off (straight red)	Booked	Sent off (straight red)
DF	(Hungary)	3	Ákos Takács	2	0	0	0	0	0	2 (2)	0 (0)
DF	(Hungary)	4	József Keller	1	0	1	0	0	0	2 (1)	0 (0)
DF	(Hungary)	5	Krisztián Timár	7	2	1	0	0	0	8 (7)	2 (2)
MF	(Hungary)	6	Péter Lipcsei	6	1	0	0	0	0	6 (6)	1 (1)
MF	(Serbia and Montenegro)	8	Bojan Lazić	2	1	0	0	0	0	2 (2)	1 (1)
FW	(North Macedonia)	9	Aleksandar Bajevski	1	0	0	0	0	0	1 (1)	0 (0)
MF	(Hungary)	10	Leandro	1	0	0	0	0	0	1 (1)	0 (0)
MF	(Hungary)	11	Gábor Erős	2	0	0	0	0	0	2 (2)	0 (0)
DF	(Hungary)	13	Zoltán Csurka	1	0	0	0	0	0	1 (1)	0 (0)
FW	(Hungary)	15	László Bartha	2	0	0	0	0	0	2 (2)	0 (0)
DF	(Hungary)	16	Zsolt Szálkai	2	0	0	0	0	0	2 (2)	0 (0)
DF	(Hungary)	17	Krisztián Budovinszky	2	0	1	0	0	0	3 (2)	0 (0)
DF	(Hungary)	18	Zsolt Laczkó	3	0	1	0	0	0	4 (3)	0 (0)
DF	(Hungary)	19	Zsolt Bognár	5	0	0	0	0	0	5 (5)	0 (0)
MF	(Hungary)	20	Dénes Rósa	1	0	0	0	0	0	1 (1)	0 (0)
DF	(Romania)	23	Sorin Botiș	3	1	0	0	0	0	3 (3)	1 (1)
DF	(Hungary)	24	Gábor Gyepes	0	0	1	0	0	0	1 (0)	0 (0)
MF	(Hungary)	27	Richárd Csepregi	2	0	0	0	0	0	2 (2)	0 (0)
FW	(Hungary)	42	Zoltán Jovánczai	5	0	0	0	0	0	5 (5)	0 (0)
DF	(Hungary)	78	Zoltán Balog	9	2	0	0	0	0	9 (9)	2 (2)
DF	(Hungary)	88	Dániel Tőzsér	6	0	2	0	0	0	8 (6)	0 (0)
			TOTALS	63	7	7	0	0	0	70 (63)	7 (7)

=== Clean sheets ===
Last updated on 3 June 2006

Position	Nation	Number	Name	OTP Bank Liga	UEFA Cup	Hungarian Cup	Total
1	(Hungary)	22	Lajos Szűcs	5	0	0	5
2	(Hungary)	12	Szabolcs Kemenes	3	0	0	3
3	(Hungary)	1	Milán Udvarácz	0	0	0	0
4	(Hungary)	35	Kálmán Szabó	0	0	0	0
			TOTALS	8	0	0	8
