= 2006–07 Ferencvárosi TC season =

Ferencvárosi TC
2006–07 season
- Chairman: János Furulyás
- Manager: Imre Gellei (until 14 April 2007); Zoran Kuntić
- Stadium: Üllői úti stadion
- NB 2 (east): Runners-up
- Hungarian Cup: Quarter-final
- Top goalscorer: League: Attila Tököli (19); All: Attila Tököli (24)
- Highest home attendance: 14,075 vs Jászapáti (12 August 2006)
- Lowest home attendance: 5,000 vs Kazincbarcika (4 June 2007)

The 2006–07 season will be Ferencvárosi TC's 1st competitive season, 1st consecutive season in the Nemzeti Bajnokság II, and 107th year in existence as a football club.

== Squad ==
As of match played 21 July 2007

No.	Name	Nationality	Position	Date of birth (age)	Signed from	Signed in	Apps.	Goals
Goalkeepers
35	Kálmán Szabó	(Hungary)	GK	27 July 1980 (aged 26)	youth sector	2006	2	0
59	Szabolcs Kemenes	(Hungary)	GK	18 May 1986 (aged 21)	Charlton Athletic	2005	43	0
70	László Komora	(Hungary)	GK	10 September 1986 (aged 20)	youth sector	2006	0	0
Defenders
4	József Nagy	(Hungary)	DF	1 January 1988 (aged 19)	youth sector	2006	6	0
9	Sándor Nagy	(Hungary)	DF	1 January 1988 (aged 19)	youth sector	2006	8	1
11	József Megyesi	(Hungary)	DF	13 May 1987 (aged 20)	youth sector	2006	0	0
13	Noel Fülöp	(Hungary)	DF	29 January 1988 (aged 19)	youth sector	2006	0	0
17	Dániel Ferencz	(Hungary)	DF	21 September 1984 (aged 22)	youth sector	2006	15	0
19	Jeremías Buz	(Argentina)	DF	13 August 1983 (aged 23)	Diósgyőr	2006	9	4
26	Attila Dragóner	(Hungary)	DF	15 November 1974 (aged 32)	Vitória Guimarães	2006	171	19
28	Zsolt Bognár	(Hungary)	DF	28 March 1979 (aged 28)	Győr	2002	85	1
78	Zoltán Balog	(Hungary)	DF	22 February 1978 (aged 29)	Cegléd	2000	128	2
Midfielders
6	Péter Lipcsei	(Hungary)	MF	28 March 1972 (aged 35)	Austria Salzburg	2000	364	89
8	Bojan Lazić	(Serbia)	MF	13 May 1974 (aged 33)	Sopron	2005	37	0
14	Tamás Szalai	(Hungary)	MF	12 June 1984 (aged 23)	youth sector	2003	31	1
18	Zsolt Laczkó	(Hungary)	MF	18 December 1986 (aged 20)	youth sector	2005	57	15
20	László Brettschneider	(Hungary)	MF	22 January 1985 (aged 22)	youth sector	2005	14	0
21	Norbert Zsivóczky	(Hungary)	MF	16 February 1988 (aged 19)	youth sector	2006	5	0
23	Imre Deme	(Hungary)	MF	3 August 1983 (aged 23)	Tatabánya	2006	23	0
27	Richárd Csepregi	(Hungary)	MF	27 July 1985 (aged 21)	youth sector	2005	39	0
87	László Fitos	(Hungary)	MF	27 February 1987 (aged 20)	youth sector	2005	27	1
88	Dávid Kulcsár	(Hungary)	MF	25 February 1988 (aged 19)	youth sector	2006	5	0
Forwards
7	Dávid Horváth	(Hungary)	FW	1 February 1985 (aged 22)	youth sector	2005	21	3
15	László Bartha	(Hungary)	FW	9 February 1987 (aged 20)	youth sector	2005	48	10
42	Zoltán Jovánczai	(Hungary)	FW	8 December 1984 (aged 22)	Kaposvár	2005	43	15
55	Attila Tököli	(Hungary)	FW	14 May 1976 (aged 31)	AEL Limassol	2006	76	42
Players away on loan
Players who left during the season
5	Krisztián Timár	(Hungary)	DF	4 October 1979 (aged 27)	Nyíregyháza	2005	36	6
13	Zoltán Csurka	(Hungary)	DF	11 August 1984 (aged 22)	youth sector	2005	7	0

== Transfers ==
=== Summer ===
In: Note: Flags indicate national team as defined under FIFA eligibility rules; some limited exceptions apply. Players may hold more than one non-FIFA nationality.

No.	Pos.	Nation	Player
—	DF	HUN	Attila Dragóner (from (Portugal) Vitória Guimarães)
—	MF	HUN	Imre Deme (from Tatabánya)
—	FW	HUN	Attila Tököli (from (Cyprus) AEL Limassol)

Out: Note: Flags indicate national team as defined under FIFA eligibility rules; some limited exceptions apply. Players may hold more than one non-FIFA nationality.

No.	Pos.	Nation	Player
3	DF	HUN	Ákos Takács (to (Denmark) Vejle)
4	DF	HUN	József Keller (to Velence)
8	FW	HUN	Árpád Nógrádi (to Pécs)
9	FW	MKD	Aleksandar Bajevski (to (Poland) Górnik Łęczna)
10	MF	HUN	Leandro (to Debrecen)
11	MF	HUN	Gábor Erős (to (Greece) Panthrakikos)
16	DF	HUN	Zsolt Szálkai (to Pápa)
17	DF	HUN	József Keller (to Budapest Honvéd)
23	DF	ROU	Sorin Botiș (to Zalaegerszeg)
88	MF	HUN	Dániel Tőzsér (to (Greece) AEK Athens)
—	DF	HUN	Gábor Kovács (to Vasas)
—	MF	HUN	Gábor Gyömbér (to (Brazil) Náutico)
—	MF	HUN	Viktor Bölcsföldi (to Fehérvár)

=== Winter ===
In: Note: Flags indicate national team as defined under FIFA eligibility rules; some limited exceptions apply. Players may hold more than one non-FIFA nationality.

No.	Pos.	Nation	Player
11	DF	HUN	József Medgyesi (from youth sector)
13	DF	HUN	Noel Fülöp (from youth sector)
19	DF	ARG	Jeremías Buz (from Diósgyőr)

Out: Note: Flags indicate national team as defined under FIFA eligibility rules; some limited exceptions apply. Players may hold more than one non-FIFA nationality.

No.	Pos.	Nation	Player
5	DF	HUN	Krisztián Timár (loan to (England) Plymouth)
19	DF	HUN	Zsolt Bognár (to (Italy) Messina)

== Pre–season and friendlies ==
Win Draw Loss Fixtures

5 July 2006 Friendly	Ferencváros	3–1	(Slovakia) Rimavská Sobota	Budapest, Hungary
	Szalai 15'; Jovánczai 27'; Brettschneider 60'	Report	Tomko 40'	Stadium: Üllői úti Stadion; Attendance: 300; Referee: Mocsári

8 July 2006 Friendly	Ferencváros	3–1	(Hungary) Soroksár	Budapest, Hungary
	Bartha 15'; Lipcsei 35' (pen.); Csurka 81'	Report	Matondo 55'	Stadium: Üllői úti Stadion

11 July 2006 Friendly	Ferencváros	3–3	(Hungary) Kecskemét	Budapest, Hungary
	Tímár 40'; Horváth 58'; Brettschneider 86'	Report	Yannick; Balla	Stadium: Üllői úti Stadion; Attendance: 300; Referee: Selmeczi

13 July 2006 Friendly	Ferencváros	3–2	(Hungary) Vasas	Budapest, Hungary
	Jovánczai 27', 42'; Lazić 31' (pen.)	Report	Lázok 22'; Németh 47' (pen.)	Stadium: Üllői úti Stadion; Attendance: 500; Referee: Gergely Szőts

15 July 2006 Friendly	Ferencváros	0–1	(Romania) Jiul Petroșani	Budapest, Hungary
		Report	Voicu 6'	Stadium: Üllői úti Stadion; Attendance: 200; Referee: Mocsári

19 July 2006 Friendly	Ferencváros	5–0	(Hungary) Budapest Honvéd	Budapest, Hungary
	Takács 27'; Leandro 43'; Bartha 51', 57'; Lazić 78' (pen.)	Report		Stadium: Üllői úti Stadion; Attendance: 800; Referee: Jármer

22 July 2006 Friendly	Felcsút (Hungary)	2–4	Ferencváros	Felcsút, Hungary
	Goal	Report	Lazić; Jovánczai; Takács; Bartha	Stadium: Pancho Aréna; Attendance: 400; Referee: Kovács

2 August 2006 Friendly	Ferencváros	0–0	(Hungary) Soroksár	Budapest, Hungary
		Report		Stadium: Üllői úti Stadion; Attendance: 600; Referee: Sütő

5 August 2006 Friendly	Balatonlelle (Hungary)	0–3	Ferencváros	Balatonlelle, Hungary
		Report	Szalai 23', 72'; Laczkó 38'	Stadium: Pancho Aréna; Attendance: 1,500; Referee: Balogh

== Competitions ==
=== Overview ===
Competition	First match	Last match	Starting round	Final position	Record							
Competition	First match	Last match	Starting round	Final position	Pld	W	D	L	GF	GA	GD	Win %
Nemzeti Bajnokság II	12 August 2006	16 June 2007	Matchday 1	Runners-up	30	18	11	1	70	21	+49	60.00
Hungarian Cup	20 September 2006	4 April 2007	Round of 64	Quarter-final	6	5	0	1	13	6	+7	83.33
Total					36	23	11	2	83	27	+56	63.89

Last updated: 16 June 2007
Source: Competitions

=== Nemzeti Bajnokság II ===
==== League table ====
Pos	Team	Pld	W	D	L	GF	GA	GD	Pts	Promotion or relegation
1	Nyíregyháza (P)	30	20	9	1	67	24	+43	69	Promotion to Nemzeti Bajnokság I
2	Ferencváros	30	18	11	1	70	21	+49	65	
3	Orosháza	30	16	7	7	58	40	+18	55	
4	Szolnok	30	13	10	7	45	35	+10	49	
5	Bőcs	30	12	10	8	37	37	0	46	

Source: Hungarian Football Federation (in Hungarian), Soccerway
Rules for classification: 1) Points; 2) Matches won; 3) Goal difference; 4) Goals scored; 5) Head-to-head points; 6) Head-to-head goal difference; 7) Head-to-head away goals scored; 8) Fair play ranking; 9) Drawing of lots.
(P) Promoted

==== Results summary ====
Overall								Home						Away					
Pld	W	D	L	GF	GA	GD	Pts	W	D	L	GF	GA	GD	W	D	L	GF	GA	GD
30	18	11	1	70	21	+49	65	11	3	1	36	7	+29	7	8	0	34	14	+20

Last updated: 16 June 2007.
Source: Soccerway

==== Results by round ====
Round	1	2	3	4	5	6	7	8	9	10	11	12	13	14	15	16	17	18	19	20	21	22	23	24	25	26	27	28	29	30
Ground	H	A	H	A	H	A	H	A	H	H	H	H	A	H	A	A	H	A	H	A	H	A	H	A	A	A	A	H	A	H
Result	W	W	W	W	W	D	W	D	W	W	W	W	D	W	D	W	D	W	W	D	L	D	D	W	W	W	D	W	D	D
Position	4	2	1	1	1	1	1	1	1	1	1	1	1	1	1	1	1	1	1	1	1	1	1	1	1	1	2	2	2	2

Updated to match(es) played on 16 June 2007. Source: Matches
A = Away; H = Home; W = Win; D = Draw; L = Loss

==== Matches ====
12 August 2006 1	Ferencváros	1–0	Jászapáti	Budapest
17:00 CEST	Laczkó 83'	Report		Stadium: Üllői úti Stadion; Attendance: 14,075; Referee: Tamás Bognár

19 August 2006 2	Szolnok	2–5	Ferencváros	Szolnok
15:00 CEST	Pintér 21'; Antal 59' (pen.)	Report	Lipcsei 23' (pen.), 54'; Bartha 25'; Laczkó 33', 73'	Stadium: Tiszaligeti Stadion; Attendance: 10,000; Referee: Zoltán Iványi

26 August 2006 3	Ferencváros	4–0	Makó	Budapest
19:00 CEST	Dragóner 6'; Bartha 28', 60'; Lipcsei 85' (pen.)	Report	Saveljev (yellow card) 57' (yellow-red card) 83'	Stadium: Üllői úti Stadion; Attendance: 10,721; Referee: Péter Solymosi

3 September 2006 4	Vecsés	0–3	Ferencváros	Budapest
16:30 CEST		Report	Dragóner 15'; Laczkó 33'; Lipcsei 54' (pen.)	Stadium: Ferenc Puskás Stadium; Attendance: 10,000; Referee: Zsolt Szabó

9 September 2006 5	Ferencváros	5–0	Orosháza	Budapest
19:00 CEST	Lipcsei 2'; Tököli 23'; Laczkó 50'; Bartha 70', 90+1'	Report		Stadium: Üllői úti Stadion; Attendance: 10,377; Referee: Szabolcs Szilasi

16 September 2006 6	Kecskemét	2–2	Ferencváros	Kecskemét
18:00 CEST	Csordás 9'; Balla 90+1'; Ábel (red card) 10'	Report	Timár 27'; Bartha 40'	Stadium: Széktói Stadion; Attendance: 10,000; Referee: István Mészáros

23 September 2006 7	Ferencváros	7–1	Tuzsér	Budapest
18:00 CEST	Tököli 11', 16', 44'; Timár 18'; Laczkó 23'; Jovánczai 59'; Tóth 83' (o.g.)	Report	Gergely 72'	Stadium: Üllői úti Stadion; Attendance: 9,162; Referee: Csaba Sápi

30 September 2006 8	Nyíregyháza	0–0	Ferencváros	Nyíregyháza
15:00 CEST		Report		Stadium: Városi Stadion; Attendance: 10,000; Referee: Zoltán Iványi

6 October 2006 9	Ferencváros	2–0	Karcag	Budapest
19:00 CEST	Lipcsei 24' (pen.); Timár 49'	Report		Stadium: Üllői úti Stadion; Attendance: 8,973; Referee: Krsztián Pánczél

14 October 2006 10	Ferencváros	4–0	Jászberény	Budapest
18:00 CEST	Tököli 3', 90+1'; Laczkó 73'; Jovánczai 83'	Report		Stadium: Üllői úti Stadion; Attendance: 6,522; Referee: Gábor Oláh

21 October 2006 11	Ferencváros	2–1	Békéscsaba	Budapest
15:00 CEST	Jovánczai 7'; Tököli 56'	Report	Pozsár 53'	Stadium: Üllői úti Stadion; Attendance: 8,714; Referee: Gergely Sulyok

28 October 2006 12	Ferencváros	2–1	Bőcs	Budapest
18:00 CET	Lipcsei 54' (pen.); Laczkó 68'	Report	Urbin 56'	Stadium: Üllői úti Stadion; Attendance: 8,868; Referee: Miklós Demeter

4 November 2006 13	Kazincbarcika	2–2	Ferencváros	Kazincbarcika
13:30 CET	Kovács 64'; Dávid 82'	Report	Tököli 23'; Laczkó 27'	Stadium: Pete András Stadion; Attendance: 8,000; Referee: József Erdős

11 November 2006 14	Ferencváros	2–0	Budafok	Budapest
16:00 CET	Laczkó 37'; Fitos 77'	Report		Stadium: Üllői úti Stadion; Attendance: 7,000; Referee: Károly Török

18 November 2006 15	Baktalórántháza	0–0	Ferencváros	Nyíregyháza
13:00 CET		Report	Dragóner (yellow card) 51' (yellow-red card) 77'	Stadium: Városi Stadion; Attendance: 2,500; Referee: József Berger

10 March 2007 16	Jászapáti	0–2	Ferencváros	Jászapáti
15:00 CET		Report	Tököli 55'; Horváth 90+3'; Ferencz (yellow card) 76' (yellow-red card) 81'	Stadium: Városi Stadion; Attendance: 5,762; Referee: Gábor Oláh

17 March 2007 17	Ferencváros	0–0	Szolnok	Budapest
18:00 CET		Report		Stadium: Üllői úti Stadion; Attendance: 7,064; Referee: István Mészáros

25 March 2007 18	Makó	1–3	Ferencváros	Makó
15:00 CEST	Csamangó 87'	Report	Tököli 55'; Laczkó 65'; Jovánczai 85'	Stadium: Erdei Ferenc téri Sporttelep; Attendance: 3,500; Referee: Ferenc Bede

31 March 2007 19	Ferencváros	1–0	Vecsés	Budapest
18:00 CET	Lipcsei 64'	Report	Csillag (yellow card) 16' (yellow-red card) 44'	Stadium: Üllői úti Stadion; Attendance: 6,000; Referee: Mihály Fábián

7 April 2007 20	Orosháza	1–1	Ferencváros	Orosháza
16:30 CEST	Szabó 20'; Fekete (red card) 90+1'	Report	Lipcsei 90+2'	Stadium: Mátrai Sándor Stadion; Attendance: 3,000; Referee: Csaba Sápi

14 April 2007 21	Ferencváros	1–3	Kecskemét	Budapest
18:00 CET	Lipcsei 33'	Report	Csordás 5'; Yannick 72', 81'	Stadium: Üllői úti Stadion; Attendance: 5,500; Referee: András Sóthy

21 April 2007 22	Tuzsér	1–1	Ferencváros	Orosháza
14:30 CEST	Csobán 42'	Report	Bartha 28'	Stadium: Lónyay Kastélykerti pálya Attendance: 3,000; Referee: Zsolt Szabó

30 April 2007 23	Ferencváros	1–1	Nyíregyháza	Budapest
18:00 CET	Tököli 40'	Report	Montvai 21'	Stadium: Üllői úti Stadion; Attendance: 13,408; Referee: Sándor Gergely

6 May 2007 24	Karcag	1–2	Ferencváros	Karcag
16:45 CEST	Mitasz 71'	Report	Buz 30'; Lipcsei 63'	Stadium: Ligeti úti Sporttelep; Attendance: 3,000; Referee: Szabolcs Szilasi

12 May 2007 25	Jászberény	2–7	Ferencváros	Jászberény
13:30 CEST	Németh 34', 43'; Majzik (red card) 65'	Report	Buz 20', 37'; Tököli 48', 65', 88', 90'; Laczkó 57'	Stadium: Városi Stadion; Attendance: 3,500; Referee: Roland Veizer

30 May 2007 26	Békéscsaba	0–4	Ferencváros	Békéscsaba
18:00 CEST		Report	Bartha 9'; Tököli 29', 32'; Horváth 81'	Stadium: Kórház utcai Stadion; Attendance: 7,000; Referee: József Berger

27 May 2007 27	Bőcs	0–0	Ferencváros	Miskolc
17:30 CEST		Report		Stadium: DVTK Stadion; Attendance: 4,000; Referee: Péter Solymosi

4 June 2007 28	Ferencváros	4–0	Kazincbarcika	Budapest
18:00 CET	Horváth 6'; Tököli 27'; Lipcsei 39'; S. Nagy 42'	Report		Stadium: Üllői úti Stadion; Attendance: 5,000; Referee: Zoltán Iványi

9 June 2007 29	Budafok	2–2	Ferencváros	Tatabánya
15:30 CEST	Ujhelyi 59'; Schmatovich 71'	Report	Buz 43'; Tököli 69'	Stadium: Városi Stadion; Attendance: 2,500; Referee: Roland Veizer

16 June 2007 30	Ferencváros	0–0	Baktalórántháza	Budapest
18:00 CET		Report		Stadium: Üllői úti Stadion; Attendance: 6,000; Referee: Csaba Sápi

=== Hungarian Cup ===
20 September 2006 Round of 64	Kaposvölgye	1–2	Ferencváros	Kaposvár
CEST	Horváth 31'; Kővári (red card) 90'	Report	Lipcsei 45' (pen.); Deme 51'	Stadium: Rákóczi Stadion; Attendance: 3,500; Referee: Péter Solymosi

25 October 2006 Round of 32	Ferencváros	4–0	Pécs	Budapest
CET	Tököli 38'; Szalai 41'; Timár 78'; Csepregi 88'	Report		Stadium: Üllői úti Stadion; Attendance: 5,000; Referee: Tamás Arany

8 November 2006 Round of 16 (1st leg)	Ferencváros	1–0	Gyirmót	Budapest
CET	Tököli 66'	Report		Stadium: Üllői úti Stadion; Attendance: 4,000; Referee: Viktor Kassai

22 November 2006 Round of 16 (2nd leg)	Gyirmót	1–3 (1–4 agg.)	Ferencváros	Győr
CET	Tóth 65'	Report	Tököli 15', 27' (red card) 45'; Lipcsei 48'; Dragóner (red card) 61'; Timár (red card) 90+3'	Stadium: Ménfői úti Stadion; Attendance: 5,000; Referee: Ferenc Bede

22 March 2007 Quarter-final (1st leg)	Ferencváros	0–2	Vasas	Budapest
CET		Report	Németh 26'; Kenesei 78'	Stadium: Üllői úti Stadion; Attendance: 8,000; Referee: Viktor Kassai

4 April 2007 Quarter-final (2nd leg)	Vasas	2–3 (4–3 agg.)	Ferencváros	Budapest
CEST	Kenesei 16', 40'	Report	Lazić 56'; Dragóner 78'; Tököli 79'	Stadium: Illovszky Rudolf Stadion; Attendance: 5,000; Referee: Tamás Arany

== Statistics ==
=== Appearances and goals ===
Last updated on 16 June 2007.

No.	Pos	Nat	Player	Total		Nemzeti Bajnokság II		Hungarian Cup	
No.	Pos	Nat	Player	Apps	Goals	Apps	Goals	Apps	Goals
4	DF	(Hungary) HUN	József Nagy	6	0	6	0	0	0
6	MF	(Hungary) HUN	Péter Lipcsei	35	14	29	12	6	2
7	FW	(Hungary) HUN	Dávid Horváth	19	3	17	3	2	0
8	MF	(Serbia) SRB	Bojan Lazić	33	1	27	0	6	1
9	DF	(Hungary) HUN	Sándor Nagy	8	1	8	1	0	0
13	DF	(Hungary) HUN	Zoltán Csurka	1	0	1	0	0	0
14	MF	(Hungary) HUN	Tamás Szalai	16	1	12	0	4	1
15	FW	(Hungary) HUN	László Bartha	32	8	26	8	6	0
17	DF	(Hungary) HUN	Dániel Ferencz	20	0	15	0	5	0
18	MF	(Hungary) HUN	Zsolt Laczkó	34	12	28	12	6	0
19	DF	(Argentina) ARG	Jeremías Buz	9	4	9	4	0	0
20	MF	(Hungary) HUN	László Brettschneider	13	0	13	0	0	0
21	MF	(Hungary) HUN	Norbert Zsivóczky	6	0	5	0	1	0
23	MF	(Hungary) HUN	Imre Deme	28	1	23	0	5	1
26	DF	(Hungary) HUN	Attila Dragóner	31	3	26	2	5	1
27	MF	(Hungary) HUN	Richárd Csepregi	24	1	20	0	4	1
28	DF	(Hungary) HUN	Zsolt Bognár	32	0	26	0	6	0
35	GK	(Hungary) HUN	Kálmán Szabó	3	-4	2	-2	1	-2
42	FW	(Hungary) HUN	Zoltán Jovánczai	19	4	16	4	3	0
55	FW	(Hungary) HUN	Attila Tököli	29	24	25	19	4	5
59	GK	(Hungary) HUN	Szabolcs Kemenes	33	-23	28	-19	5	-4
78	DF	(Hungary) HUN	Zoltán Balog	22	0	18	0	4	0
87	MF	(Hungary) HUN	László Fitos	19	1	15	1	4	0
88	MF	(Hungary) HUN	Dávid Kulcsár	5	0	5	0	0	0
Youth players:
11	DF	(Hungary) HUN	József Medgyesi	0	0	0	0	0	0
13	DF	(Hungary) HUN	Noel Fülöp	1	0	0	0	1	0
70	GK	(Hungary) HUN	László Komora	0	0	0	-0	0	-0
Out to loan:
5	DF	(Hungary) HUN	Krisztián Timár	16	4	13	3	3	1
Players no longer at the club:

=== Top scorers ===
Includes all competitive matches. The list is sorted by shirt number when total goals are equal.

Last updated on 16 June 2007

Position	Nation	Number	Name	Nemzeti Bajnokság II	Hungarian Cup	Total
1	(Hungary)	55	Attila Tököli	19	5	24
2	(Hungary)	6	Péter Lipcsei	12	2	14
3	(Hungary)	18	Zsolt Laczkó	12	0	12
4	(Hungary)	15	László Bartha	8	0	8
5	(Hungary)	42	Zoltán Jovánczai	4	0	4
6	(Argentina)	19	Jeremías Buz	4	0	4
7	(Hungary)	5	Krisztián Timár	3	1	4
8	(Hungary)	7	Dávid Horváth	3	0	3
9	(Hungary)	26	Attila Dragóner	2	1	3
10	(Hungary)	87	László Fitos	1	0	1
11	(Hungary)	9	Sándor Nagy	1	0	1
12	(Hungary)	23	Imre Deme	0	1	1
13	(Hungary)	14	Tamás Szalai	0	1	1
14	(Hungary)	27	Richárd Csepregi	0	1	1
15	(Serbia)	8	Bojan Lazić	0	1	1
/	/	/	Own Goals	1	0	1
			TOTALS	70	13	83

=== Disciplinary record ===
Includes all competitive matches. Players with 1 card or more included only.

Last updated on 16 June 2007

Position	Nation	Number	Name	Nemzeti Bajnokság II		Hungarian Cup		Total (Hu Total)	
Position	Nation	Number	Name	Yellow card	Red card	Yellow card	Red card	Yellow card	Red card
DF	(Hungary)	4	József Nagy	1	0	0	0	1 (1)	0 (0)
DF	(Hungary)	5	Krisztián Timár	3	0	1	1	4 (3)	1 (0)
MF	(Hungary)	6	Péter Lipcsei	5	0	2	0	7 (5)	0 (0)
FW	(Hungary)	7	Dávid Horváth	1	0	0	0	1 (1)	0 (0)
MF	(Serbia)	8	Bojan Lazić	3	0	1	0	4 (3)	0 (0)
DF	(Hungary)	9	Sándor Nagy	2	0	0	0	2 (2)	0 (0)
MF	(Hungary)	15	László Bartha	4	0	1	0	5 (4)	0 (0)
DF	(Hungary)	17	Dániel Ferencz	3	1	0	0	3 (3)	1 (1)
MF	(Hungary)	18	Zsolt Laczkó	3	0	1	0	4 (3)	0 (0)
DF	(Argentina)	19	Jeremías Buz	1	0	0	0	1 (1)	0 (0)
MF	(Hungary)	20	László Brettschneider	3	0	0	0	3 (3)	0 (0)
MF	(Hungary)	23	Imre Deme	3	0	2	0	5 (3)	0 (0)
DF	(Hungary)	26	Attila Dragóner	7	1	2	1	9 (7)	2 (1)
MF	(Hungary)	27	Richárd Csepregi	1	0	1	0	2 (1)	0 (0)
DF	(Hungary)	28	Zsolt Bognár	3	0	1	0	4 (3)	0 (0)
FW	(Hungary)	42	Zoltán Jovánczai	2	0	0	0	2 (2)	0 (0)
FW	(Hungary)	55	Attila Tököli	5	0	1	1	6 (5)	1 (0)
DF	(Hungary)	78	Zoltán Balog	4	0	0	0	4 (4)	0 (0)
			TOTALS	54	2	13	3	67 (54)	5 (2)

=== Clean sheets ===
Last updated on 16 June 2007

Position	Nation	Number	Name	Nemzeti Bajnokság II	Hungarian Cup	Total
1	(Hungary)	59	Szabolcs Kemenes	16	2	18
2	(Hungary)	35	Kálmán Szabó	0	0	0
3	(Hungary)	70	László Komora	0	0	0
			TOTALS	16	2	18
