= Evgheni Pațula =

Moldovan footballer

Personal information
- Date of birth: 19 March 1983 (age 43)
- Position: Forward

Senior career*
Years	Team	Apps	(Gls)
1999–2003	FC Sheriff Tiraspol		
2003–2004	FC Tiraspol		
2005–2007	FC Dinamo Bender		

International career
2002–2003	Moldova	8	(1)
- * Club domestic league appearances and goals

Evgheni Pațula (born 19 March 1983) is a retired Moldovan football striker.

== International goal ==
Scores and results list Moldova's goal tally first.

No	Date	Venue	Opponent	Score	Result	Competition
1.	20 November 2002	Üllői úti Stadion, Budapest, Hungary	Hungary	1–0	1–1	Friendly match
