= Jiří Homola =

Czech footballer (born 1980)

Personal information
- Date of birth: 2 June 1980 (age 46)
- Place of birth: Nymburk, Czechoslovakia
- Height: 1.84 m (6 ft 0 in)
- Position: Defender

Youth career
- 1986–1989: Sokol Přerov nad Labem
- 1989–1990: Český Brod
- 1990–1993: Spartak Čelákovice
- 1993–1994: Slavia Prague
- 1994–1998: Spartak Čelákovice

Senior career*
Years	Team	Apps	(Gls)
1998–1999	Spartak Čelákovice		
1999–2002	Jablonec 97	61	(6)
2003–2005	Sparta Prague	43	(7)
2005–2006	Malatyaspor	22	(2)
2006–2007	Sparta Prague	8	(0)
2007–2010	Jablonec 97	56	(1)
2009	Senica	24	(0)
2010	Karviná	9	(0)
2011–2012	Dinamo Tbilisi	36	(0)
2013	Karviná	12	(2)

International career
2002	Czech Republic U-21	2	(0)
- * Club domestic league appearances and goals

Jiří Homola (born 2 June 1980) is a Czech former professional footballer.

== Club career ==
Homola played in his youth for Sokol Přerov nad Labem, SK Český Brod, Spartak Čelákovice, Slavia Prague and once more Spartak Čelákovice. In Čelákovice he joined the professional team during the 1998–99 season.

After only one year the defender was acquired by Czech First League club FK Jablonec 97, where he played until the end of 2002 and appeared in 61 league matches scoring six goals. In January 2003, Homola was acquired by Sparta Prague. At first he played regularly, although he made only seven league appearances in the 2004–05 season.

In summer 2005, he was removed from Sparta's first team and shortly thereafter transferred to the Turkish club Malatyaspor, where he spent one season. After one year Homola returned to Sparta Prague. In the beginning he often played, by the end of the second half of the season he was hardly used. In February 2007, he returned to his former club FK Jablonec. In summer of 2010, he left Jablonec and joined Karviná.
