= Gábor Zavadszky =

Hungarian footballer

Personal information
- Date of birth: 10 September 1974
- Place of birth: Budapest, Hungary
- Date of death: 7 January 2006 (aged 31)
- Place of death: Limassol, Cyprus
- Height: 1.83 m (6 ft 0 in)
- Position: Right midfielder

Youth career
- Ganz-Mávag
- Bp Építők

Senior career*
Years	Team	Apps	(Gls)
1992–1998	Ferencváros	118	(26)
1998–2001	Dunaferr	64	(16)
2001–2004	MTK Budapest	92	(19)
2004	Ferencváros	12	(3)
2005–2006	Apollon Limassol	8	(0)
Total		294	(64)

International career
2000–2003	Hungary	4	(0)
- * Club domestic league appearances and goals

Gábor Zavadszky (10 September 1974 – 7 January 2006) was a Hungarian footballer.

== Club career ==
Zavadszky was a midfielder and first played for MTK Hungária FC and Ferencvárosi Torna Club in his hometown Budapest. In early 2005 he joined Apollon Limassol in Cyprus, where he last stood under contract.

== International career ==
He represented the Hungarian national team at the 1996 Summer Olympics in Atlanta, where Hungary failed to progress from the group stage.

== Death ==
Zavadszky died on 7 January 2006 in Limassol from an embolism.

== Honours ==
Ferencvárosi TC

- Nemzeti Bajnokság I: 1995, 1996
  - Runner up: 1998
- Magyar Kupa: 1993, 1994, 1995
- Szuperkupa: 1993, 1994, 1995

Dunaferr SE

- Nemzeti Bajnokság I: 2000

MTK Hungária

- Nemzeti Bajnokság I: 2003
- Szuperkupa: 2003
