= Ferenc Róth =

Hungarian footballer

Personal information
- Full name: Ferenc Róth
- Date of birth: 24 December 1978 (age 47)
- Place of birth: Hungary
- Height: 1.83 m (6 ft 0 in)
- Position: Midfielder

Team information
- Current team: SV Zenting

Youth career
- 1988–1998: FC Fehérvár

Senior career*
Years	Team	Apps	(Gls)
1998–1999	FC Fehérvár	17	(0)
1999–2002	Zalaegerszegi TE	50	(7)
2002–2003	FC Fehérvár	12	(6)
2003–2004	Újpest FC	3	(0)
2004–2005	Lombard-Pápa TFC	29	(6)
2005–2006	FC Slovácko	16	(1)
2006–2007	FC Viktoria Plzeň	4	(0)
2006–2007	FC Slovácko	33	(2)
2007–2008	FC Viktoria Plzeň	18	(1)
2008–2010	Bohemians 1905	41	(3)

International career
1996–1997	Hungary U-18	4	(1)
1998–1999	Hungary U-21	1	(0)
- * Club domestic league appearances and goals

Ferenc Róth (born 24 December 1978) is a retired Hungarian football player.
