= Dénes Rósa =

Hungarian footballer

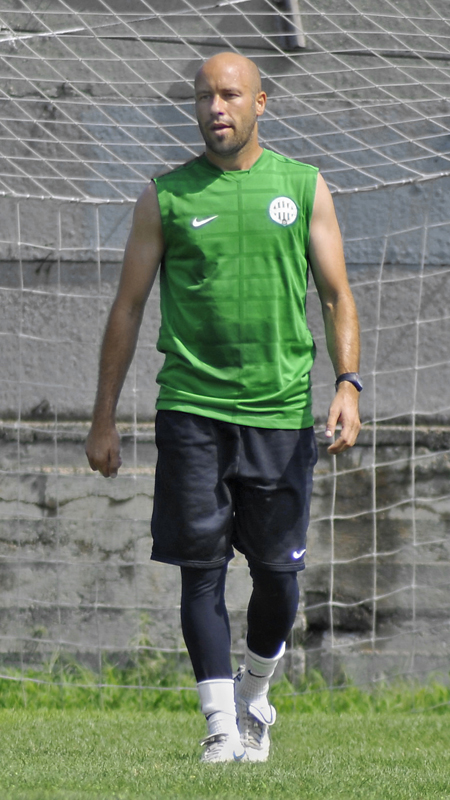

Personal information
- Date of birth: 7 April 1977 (age 49)
- Place of birth: Budapest, Hungary
- Height: 5 ft 9 in (1.75 m)
- Position: Attacking midfielder

Senior career*
Years	Team	Apps	(Gls)
1996–1998	BVSC Budapest	51	(9)
1998–2002	Győri ETO FC	49	(2)
1998	→ Soproni FAC (loan)	7	(3)
1999	→ BVSC Budapest (loan)	13	(4)
2002–2003	Dunaújváros FC	25	(2)
2003	Újpest FC	9	(1)
2003–2006	Ferencvárosi TC	66	(13)
2006–2009	Wolverhampton Wanderers	9	(2)
2007	→ Cheltenham Town (loan)	4	(0)
2009	Hibernian	12	(0)
2009–2012	Ferencvárosi TC	67	(9)

International career^{‡}
1998–2000	Hungary U21	7	(3)
2004–2005	Hungary	10	(0)
- * Club domestic league appearances and goals as of 4 August 2015 ‡ National team caps and goals as of 3 May 2010

Dénes Rósa (born 7 April 1977 in Budapest) is a former Hungarian international footballer, who last played for Hungarian First League club Ferencváros.

== Playing career ==
Rósa played for a number of clubs in his homeland of Hungary, ending up at Ferencváros where he won the league and cup double in 2004. He played in six European ties (both UEFA Cup and Champions League qualifiers) during his spell here, scoring six times.

He moved on loan to English Championship side Wolves in January 2006 on a six-month trial contract, where he linked up with former Ferencváros teammate Gábor Gyepes. He made his debut for the club on 2 January 2006 in a 2–0 defeat at Coventry City, and went on to make nine league appearances in the rest of the campaign, scoring twice. At the end of the season, Rosa and Wolves agreed a three-year contract.

However, the surprise departure of Glenn Hoddle and arrival of Mick McCarthy as manager in the summer saw him left out of first team contention afterwards. McCarthy admitted that Rosa may struggle to figure in his formation. The midfielder was loaned to League One Cheltenham Town for a month in the spring of 2007, but he was then put on the transfer list by Wolves. He made a brief substitute appearance for Wolves in the League Cup during the following season, but despite a strong goalscoring record in reserve games, never featured in the first team again.

Rósa finally left Wolves on 13 January 2009, after having his contract cancelled by mutual consent. Shortly afterwards, he signed for Scottish club Hibernian after a successful trial. He played 12 times for Hibs before leaving the club at the end of his contract. Soon afterwards, the Edinburgh Evening News claimed that Rosa was a target for city rivals Hearts, but he instead returned to Ferencvaros.

Rosa went on trial with Sunderland in February 2012.

== National team ==
Dénes Rósa making his debut on 1 June 2004, in Tianjin against China.

(Statistics correct as of 2 December 2011)

National Team Performance
Team	Year	Friendlies		International Competition		Total
Team	Year	App	Goals	App	Goals	App	Goals
Hungary	2004	3	0	3	0	6	0
Hungary	2005	4	0	0	0	4	0
Hungary	Total	7	0	3	0	10	0
