= Milán Udvarácz =

Hungarian footballer (born 1967)

Personal information
- Date of birth: 9 December 1967 (age 58)
- Place of birth: Pécs, Hungary
- Position: Goalkeeper

Senior career*
Years	Team	Apps	(Gls)
1989–1993	Kaposvár		
1993–1996	Békéscsaba	24	(0)
1997–1999	Ferencváros	49	(0)
1999–2000	South Melbourne	9	(0)
2001–2002	Honvéd	15	(0)
2002	Ferencváros	1	(0)
2007	Pécs	1	(0)
2007–2009	APIA Leichhardt		
- * Club domestic league appearances and goals

Milán Udvarácz (born 9 December 1967) is a Hungarian former professional footballer who played as a goalkeeper.

== Early life ==
Udvarácz was born in 1967 in Pécs, Hungary, and grew up knowing the family of Hungary international Pál Dárdai.

== Playing career ==
Udvarácz started his career with Hungarian side Kaposvár. He was then part of a Békéscsaba team described as "legendary and still thought of with great affection". After that, he helped Hungarian top flight side Ferencváros, win the league and cups and playing in the FIFA Club World Cup with Australian side South Melbourne.

In total, he made 90 appearances in the Hungarian top flight, playing his last Hungarian top flight game in 2007, for Pécs. In 1999, he signed for Australian side South Melbourne on the recommendation of Hungary international Ferenc Puskás, but missed the opening league game of the 1999–2000 season due to returning to Hungary for personal reasons.

== Style of play ==
Udvaracz mainly operated as a goalkeeper and was known for his leadership.

== Post-playing career ==
While playing football in Australia, Udvaracz became a physical therapist due to experiencing constant back pain during his playing career. After that, he worked as physical therapist for the Danish men's and women's national gymnastics teams.

== Personal life ==
Udvaracz has been married to Hungarian gymnast Bernadett Balázs.
