= Stadion Albert Flórián =

Former football stadium in Budapest, Hungary

Coordinates: 47°28′31″N 19°5′46″E

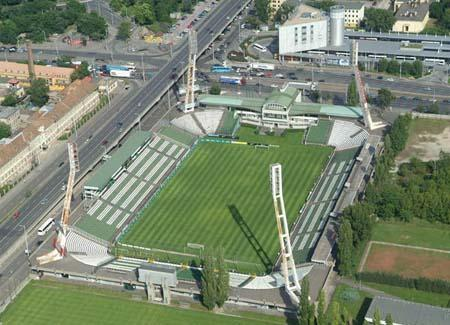
- Interactive map of Stadion Albert Flórián
- Full name: Albert Flórián Stadion
- Former names: Üllői úti stadion (1910–2007)
- Location: Budapest, Hungary
- Owner: Ferencvárosi Torna Club
- Operator: Ferencváros
- Capacity: 29,505 (1974–1991); 18,100 (1991–2013); 20,000
- Surface: Grass; Field
- Field size: 105 m × 68 m (344 ft × 223 ft)

Construction
- Groundbreaking: 1933
- Built: 1910-1911
- Opened: 1911
- Renovated: 1971-1974
- Demolished: 1971, 2013
- Architects: József Schall, Miklós Kapsza (1974–2013)

Tenants
- Hungary national football team Ferencváros

Stadion Albert Flórián was a sports stadium in Budapest, Hungary. The stadium was the home of the association football club Ferencvárosi TC. The stadium had a capacity of 18,100. Formerly known as Üllői úti stadion for its location, it was renamed in 2007 for Ballon d'Or winner club legend Flórián Albert (1941–2011). Today, the stadium's place is occupied by the newly built Groupama Arena.

== History ==
=== Construction ===
The first stadium was started to be built in the autumn of 1910. On 12 February 1911, Ferencváros played their first match at Üllői úti stadion ('Üllő Road Stadium') against Budapest rival MTK Budapest which was won by the club. The starting line-up consisted of Fritz, Rumbold, Magnlitz, Weinber, Bródy, Payer, Szeitler, Weisz, Koródy, Schlosser, Borbás. The first stadium could host 40,000 spectators.

=== First reconstruction ===
In 1971 the stands were demolished and a new stadium was started to be built. The new stadium was inaugurated on the 75th anniversary of the club. On 19 May 1974, the first match was played against the Vasas old boys. The new stadium could host 29,505 spectators (including 10 771 seats and 18 734 standing). In the 1990s the stadium was redesigned to meet the UEFA requirements therefore its capacity was reduced to 18 100.

On 21 December 2007, the stadium was changed from Üllői úti Stadion to Stadion Albert Flórián. Flórián Albert, the former Ferencváros icon, was present at the inauguration ceremony.

== Milestone matches ==
=== First era (1911–1971) ===
- First match: Ferencváros 2-1 (Hungary) MTK Budapest FC
- First UEFA match: Ferencváros 2-1 (Scotland) Rangers F.C. (UEFA Cup Winners' Cup 1960-61)
- Last UEFA match: Ferencváros 1-1 (England) Liverpool F.C. (Inter-Cities Fairs Cup 1970-71)

=== Second era (1974–2013) ===
Match	Home	Result	Opponent	Date	Competition
First match	(Hungary) Ferencváros	0–1	(Hungary) Vasas	19 May 1974	Friendly match
First UEFA Cup Winners' Cup match	(Hungary) Ferencváros	2–0	(Wales) Cardiff City F.C.	18 September 1974	1974–75 European Cup Winners' Cup, first round
Last UEFA Europa League match	(Hungary) Ferencváros	2–1	(Norway) Aalesunds FK	14 July 2011	2011–12 UEFA Europa League, second qualifying round
Last Hungarian League match	(Hungary) Ferencváros	2–1	(Hungary) Újpest FC	10 March 2013	2012–13 Nemzeti Bajnokság I, matchweek 19
Last Hungarian League Cup match	(Hungary) Ferencváros	1–0	(Hungary) Egri FC	23 March 2013	2012–13 Ligakupa, semifinals
Last match	(Hungary) Ferencváros	0–0	(Romania) CFR Cluj	24 March 2013	International friendly

== International matches ==
31 May 1984 Friendly	Hungary	1–1	Spain	Üllői úti stadion
20:00	Nagy 48'	Report	Rincón 21'	Attendance: 10,000; Referee: Aron Schmidhuber (West Germany)

2 December 1987 Euro 1988 qualifiers	Hungary	1–0	Cyprus	Üllői úti stadion
17:30	Kiprich 90'	Report		Attendance: 2,300; Referee: Dan Petrescu (Romania)

20 March 1990 Friendly	Hungary	2–0	United States	Üllői úti stadion
18:00	Petres 39'; Limperger 74'	Report		Attendance: 9,000; Referee: Heinz Holzmann (Austria)

23 September 1992 Friendly	Hungary	0–0	Israel	Üllői úti stadion
17:00		Report		Attendance: 3,000; Referee: Roman Steindl (Austria)

8 September 1993 1994 World Cup qualifiers	Hungary	1–3	Russia	Üllői úti stadion
19:00	Nikiforov 19' (o.g.)	Report	Pyatnitsky 15'; Kiriakov 52'; Borodyuk 90'	Attendance: 6,000; Referee: Gheorghe Constantin (Romania)

27 October 1993 1994 World Cup qualifiers	Hungary	1–0	Luxembourg	Üllői úti stadion
19:00	Détári 20'	Report		Attendance: 1,500; Referee: Oğuz Sarvan (Turkey)

10 September 1997 1998 World Cup qualifiers	Hungary	3–1	Azerbaijan	Üllői úti stadion
17:30	Klausz 8'; Halmai 44'; Illés 89'	Report	Lychkin 71'	Attendance: 8,112; Referee: Atanas Uzunov (Bulgaria)

29 October 1997 1998 World Cup playoffs	Hungary	1–7	FR Yugoslavia	Üllői úti stadion
20:00	Illés 89'	Report	Brnović 2'; Đukić 6'; Savićević 10'; Mijatović 26', 41', 51'; Milošević 63'	Attendance: 13,175; Referee: Vítor Melo Pereira (Portugal)

18 November 1998 Friendly	Hungary	2–0	Switzerland	Üllői úti stadion
20:00	Korsós 1'; J. Sebők 7'	Report		Attendance: 2,849; Referee: Karol Ihring (Slovakia)

10 March 1999 Friendly	Hungary	1–1	Bosnia and Herzegovina	Üllői úti stadion
19:30	Illés 66' (pen.)	Report	Kodro 39'	Attendance: 7,792; Referee: Martin Ingvarsson (Sweden)

27 March 1999 Euro 2000 qualifiers	Hungary	5–0	Liechtenstein	Üllői úti stadion
19:30	J. Sebők 16'; V. Sebők 33', 41', 85' (pen.); Illés 73'	Report		Attendance: 9,534; Referee: Kostas Kapitanis (Cyprus)

18 August 1999 Friendly	Hungary	1–1	Moldova	Üllői úti stadion
20:15	Sebők 39'	Report	Cleșcenco 65'	Attendance: 5,000; Referee: Wolfgang Sowa (Austria)

8 September 1999 Euro 2000 qualifiers	Hungary	3–0	Azerbaijan	Üllői úti stadion
20:15	Sebők 27'; Egressy 51'; Sowunmi 54'	Report		Attendance: 2,910; Referee: Sašo Lazarevski (Macedonia)

23 February 2000 Friendly	Hungary	0–3	Australia	Üllői úti stadion
20:15		Report	Laybutt 12'; Skoko 72'; Moore 90+1'	Attendance: 14,000; Referee: Dietmar Drabek (Austria)

25 April 2001 Friendly	Hungary	0–0	Finland	Üllői úti stadion
20:30		Report		Attendance: 5,175; Referee: Fiorenzo Treossi (Italy)

20 November 2002 Friendly	Hungary	1–1	Moldova	Üllői úti stadion
18:00	Dárdai 55'	Report	Pațula 16'	Attendance: 6,000; Referee: Wolfgang Sowa (Austria)

19 November 2003 Friendly	Hungary	0–1	Estonia	Üllői úti stadion
17:00		Report	Rooba 86'	Attendance: 457; Referee: Milan Šedivý (Czech Republic)

=== Record ===
P	W	D	L	GF	GA	W%
17	7	6	4	23	19	

== Photo gallery ==
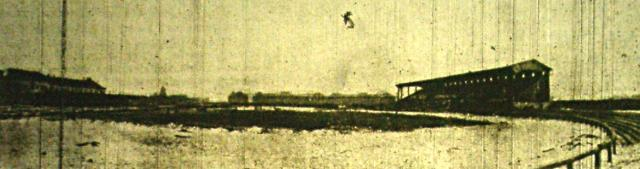
The first pitch of the club (1910-1971)

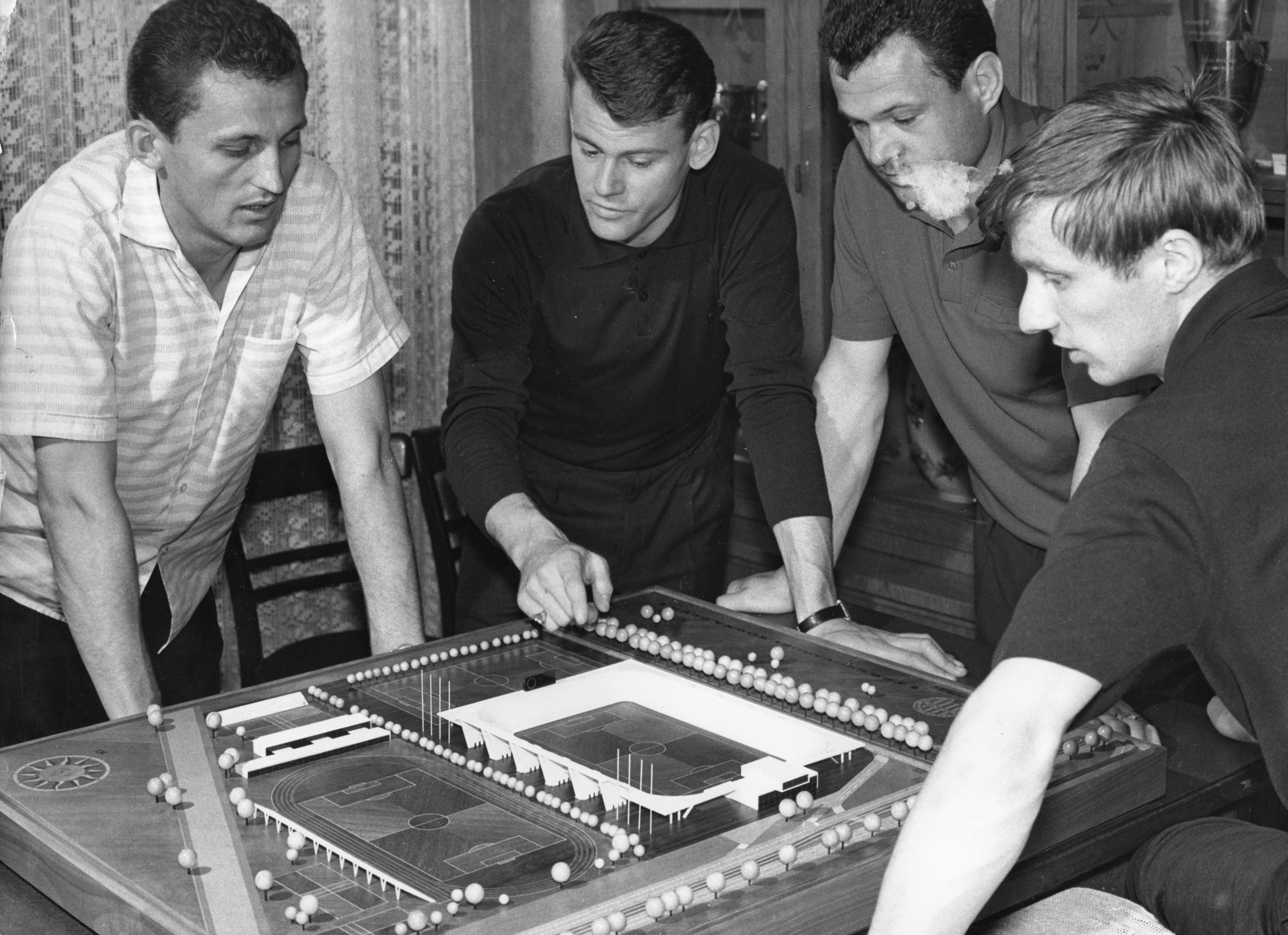
Flórián Albert, Lajos Szűcs, and Zoltán Varga discussing the plans of the new stadium in 1968

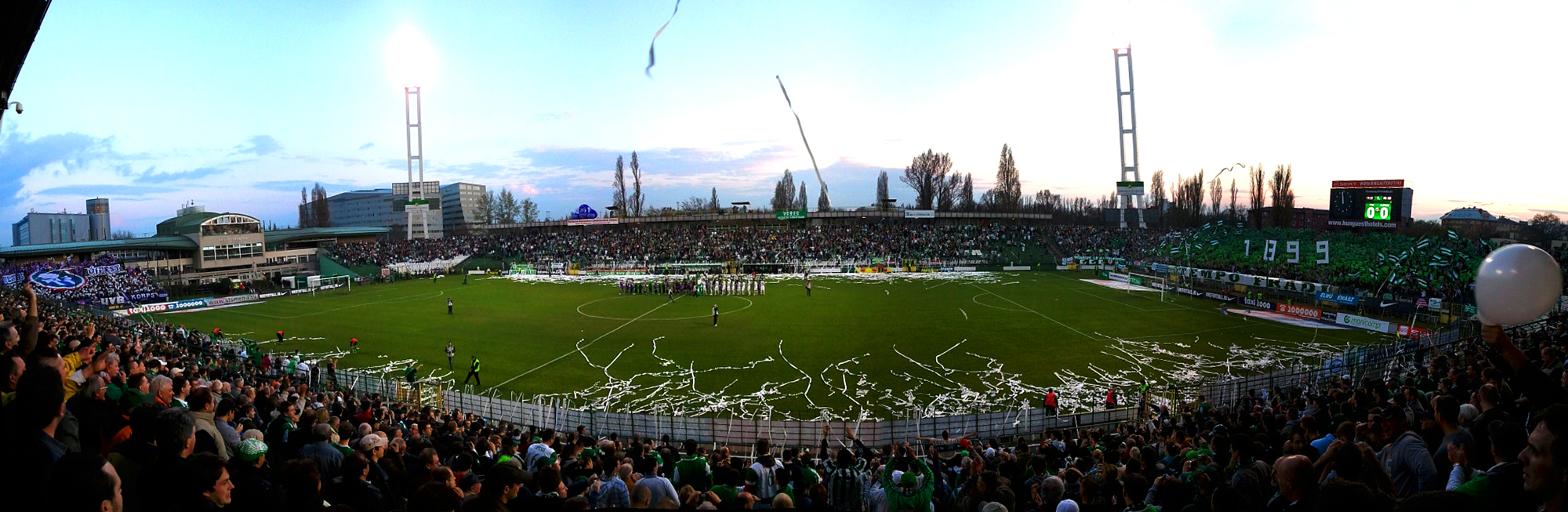
The stadium in the spring of 2011

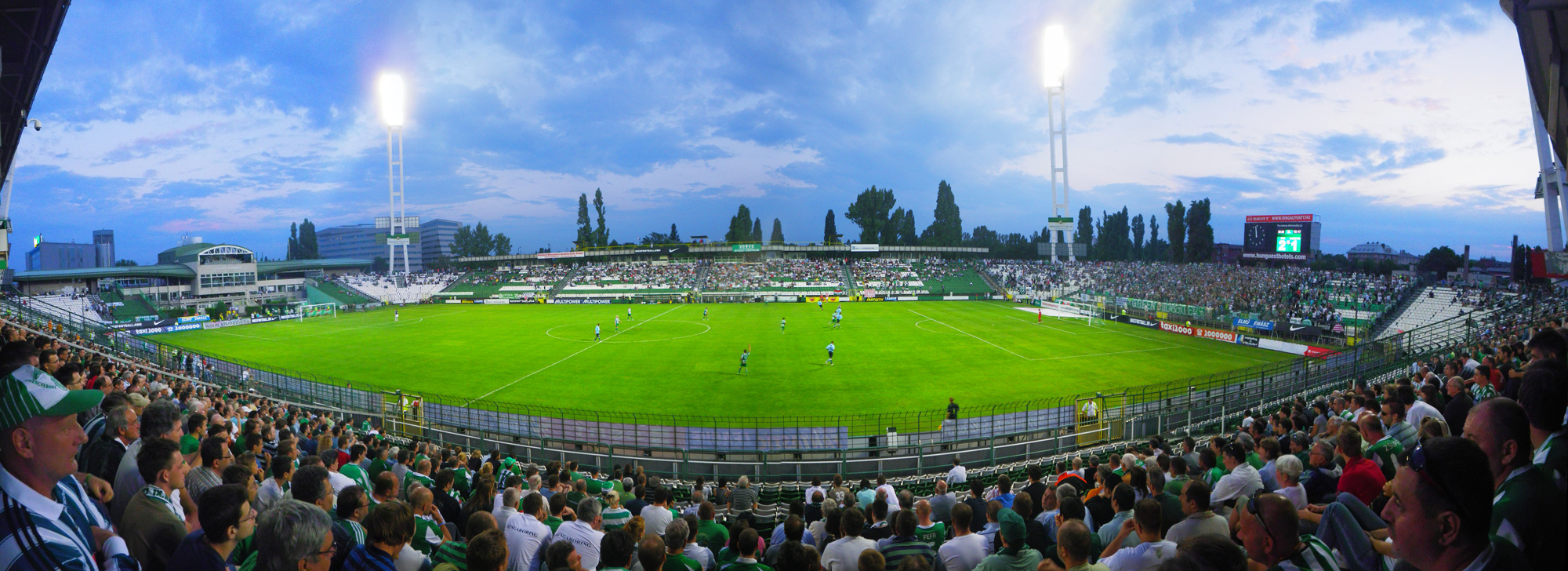
Ferencváros are playing against Paks on 30 July 2010 in a Hungarian League match

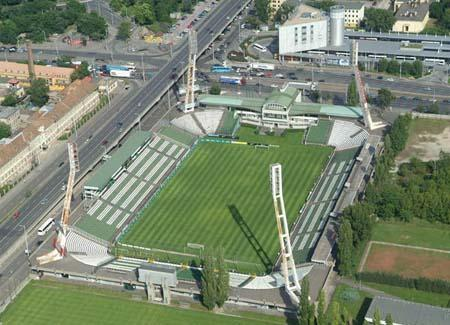
The old Albert stadion from bird view in 2011

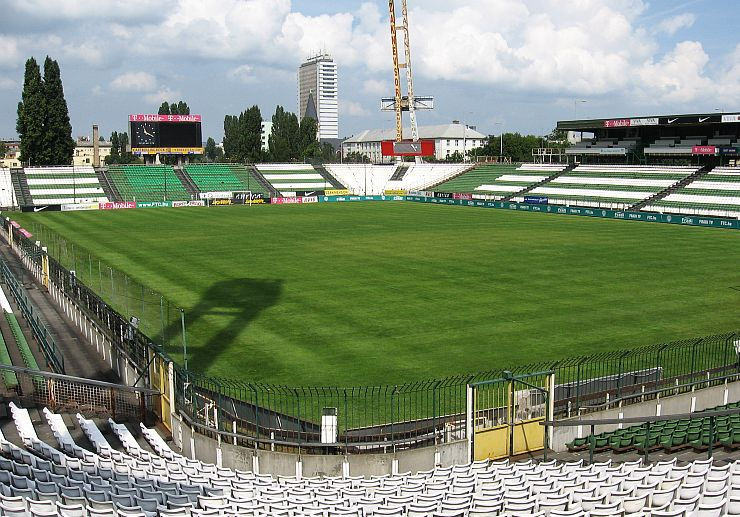
Albert Stadion
