= Bojan Lazić =

Serbian footballer

Personal information
- Full name: Bojan Lazić
- Date of birth: 13 May 1974 (age 52)
- Place of birth: Kruševac, SFR Yugoslavia
- Height: 1.83 m (6 ft 0 in)
- Position: Midfielder

Senior career*
Years	Team	Apps	(Gls)
1994-1995	Napredak Kruševac	21	(1)
1999-2000	Sutjeska		(1)
2000-2001	Bečej		
2001–2002	MTK Hungária	20	(0)
2002–2005	MATÁV Sopron	66	(1)
2006–2008	Ferencváros	55	(0)
2009	Horitschon-Unterpetersdorf	13	(2)
2009–2012	Soproni VSE	78	(2)

Managerial career
- 2018-2020: Sárvár
- * Club domestic league appearances and goals

Bojan Lazić (Serbian Cyrillic: Бојан Лaзић; born 13 May 1974 in Kruševac) is a Serbian retired football player.

== External sources ==
- (in Hungarian)
- Bojan Lazic at ÖFB (in German)
- Bojan Lazić at Hivatásos Labdarúgók Szervezete (HLSZ) [hu] (in Hungarian)
