= Sorin Botiș =

Romanian footballer

Sorin Botiş
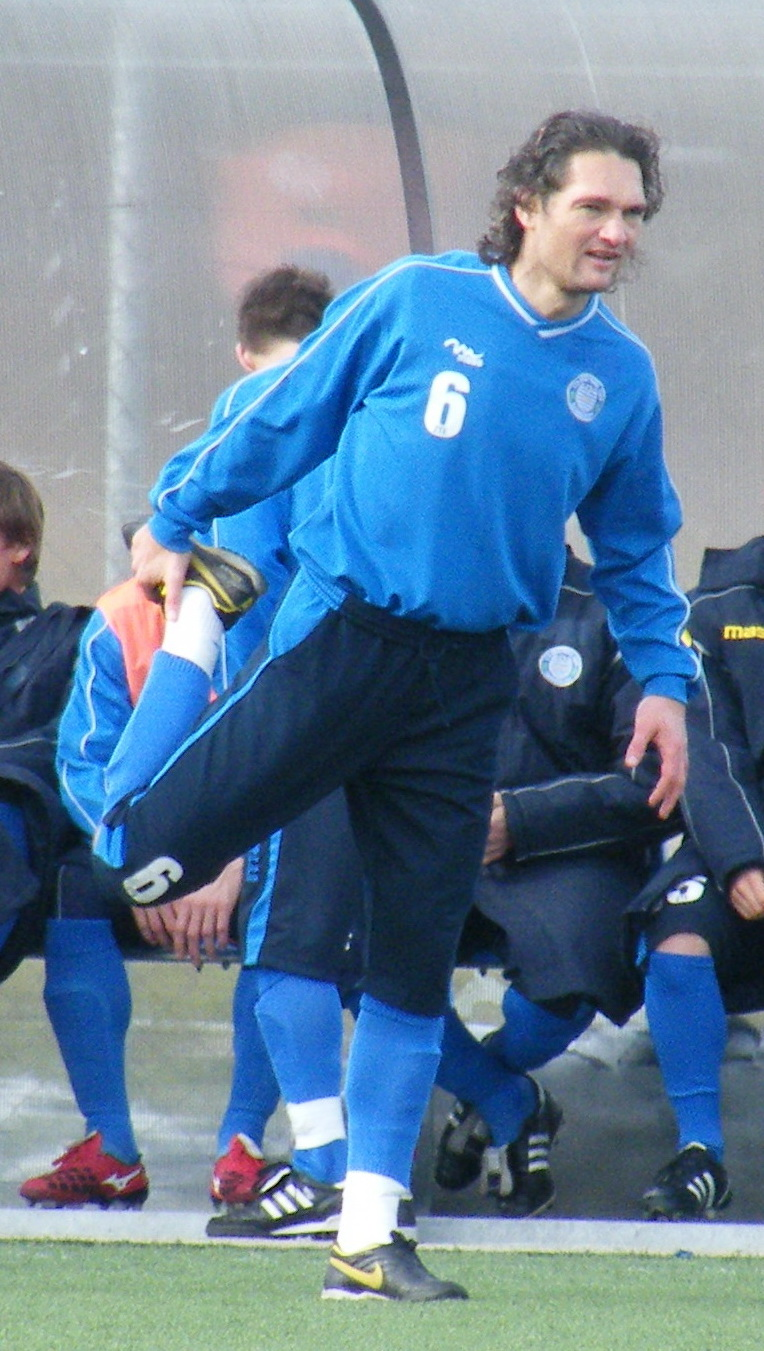

Personal information
- Date of birth: 14 April 1978 (age 48)
- Place of birth: Arad, Romania
- Height: 1.86 m (6 ft 1 in)
- Position: Defender

Youth career
- 1992–1997: UTA Arad

Senior career*
Years	Team	Apps	(Gls)
1997–2001	UTA Arad	110	(8)
2001–2002	Sheriff Tiraspol	11	(1)
2002–2003	UTA Arad	19	(0)
2003–2006	Ferencváros	53	(4)
2006–2009	Zalaegerszeg	71	(2)
2009–2012	Honvéd	78	(3)
2012–2013	Békéscsaba	28	(2)
2013–2016	UTA Arad	91	(10)
Total		461	(30)

Managerial career
- 2017–2018: UTA Arad (assistant)
- 2018–2022: UTA Arad U16
- 2022–2024: UTA Arad (team manager)
- * Club domestic league appearances and goals

Sorin Botiş (born 14 April 1978) is a former Romanian football player.

== Club career ==
=== Ferencváros ===
He made his debut on 2 August 2003 against Videoton FC Fehérvár in a match that ended 2–2.

=== Zalaegerszegi ===
He made his debut on 31 July 2006 against Videoton FC Fehérvár in a match that ended 3–2.

=== Budapest Honved ===
He made his debut on 25 July 2009 against Kaposvári Rákóczi FC in a match that ended 3–1.

== Honours ==
Sheriff Tiraspol

- Divizia Națională: 2001–02

Ferencvárosi

- Nemzeti Bajnokság I: 2003–04
- Magyar Kupa: 2003–04
- Szuperkupa: 2004

Honvéd

- Szuperkupa runner-up: 2009

UTA Arad

- Liga III: 2014–15
