= Ákos Takács =

Hungarian footballer

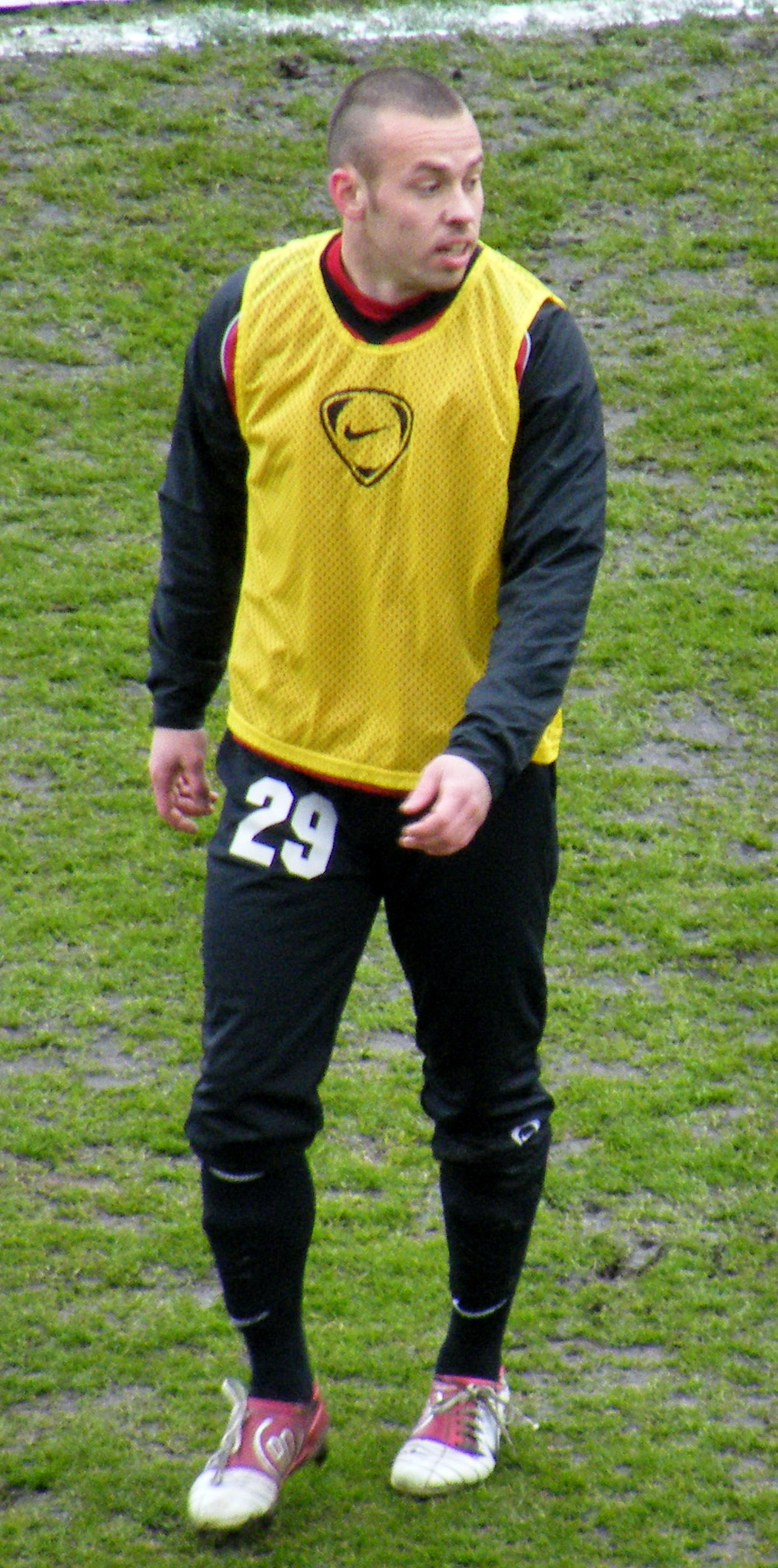

Personal information
- Date of birth: 14 February 1982 (age 44)
- Place of birth: Budapest, Hungary
- Height: 1.82 m (5 ft 11 1/2 in)
- Position: Defender

Senior career*
Years	Team	Apps	(Gls)
2001–2002	Vasas SC	0	(0)
2002–2006	Ferencvárosi TC	24	(0)
2006–2007	Vejle Boldklub	15	(0)
2007–2011	Budapest Honvéd FC	61	(1)
2011–2014	Győri ETO FC	45	(1)

International career^{‡}
1998–1999	Hungary U-16	3	(0)
2005	Hungary	5	(1)
- * Club domestic league appearances and goals as of 2 June 2013 ‡ National team caps and goals as of 13 March 2010

Ákos Takács (born 14 February 1982) is a Hungarian former professional football player, who last played for Győri ETO FC. He has played four times for the Hungary national team and scored one goal.

== Playing career ==
Takács started his career for Hungarian clubs Goliát FC, BVSC and Vasas SC. In 2002, he moved to Hungarian champions Ferencvárosi TC. His stay in Ferencváros was cut short in 2006 due to the club's financial difficulties. This resulted in a relegation of the club to the Hungarian second division on 25 July 2006. All player contracts were annulled, and Takács was able to move from the club on a free transfer. After a successful trial in Danish club Vejle Boldklub, he signed a 3-year contract on 15 August 2006.

Takács arrived in Vejle Boldklub during a low point where, after gaining promotion to the Danish Superliga, the club had lost their first five matches with the score 4–15. He debuted against Danish champions FC Copenhagen on the right-back, the fourth player in six matches to play that position. He played eight matches in a row, but suffered an injury in October 2006. After Ove Christensen replaced Kim Poulsen as manager of Vejle Boldklub in April 2007, Takács only played two matches for the club's first team, his last match being the 2–3 defeat against Odense Boldklub on 9 April 2007. On 12 November 2007 Takács and Vejle Boldklub cancelled their contract.

== International goals ==
Scores and results list Hungary's goal tally first.

#	Date	Venue	Opponent	Score	Result	Competition
1	3 September 2005	Budapest, Hungary	Malta	3-0	4-0	World Cup 2006 qual.
