= László Bartha (footballer) =

Hungarian footballer

Personal information
- Date of birth: 9 February 1987 (age 39)
- Place of birth: Komló, Hungary
- Height: 1.81 m (5 ft 11 in)
- Position: Midfielder

Team information
- Current team: Dunaföldvár

Youth career
- 2000–2001: Komló
- 2001–2005: Ferencváros

Senior career*
| Years | Team | Apps | (Gls) |
| 2004–2008 | Ferencváros | 68 | (11) |
| 2008–2010 | Kozármisleny | 28 | (7) |
| 2010–2020 | Paks | 273 | (52) |
| 2020–2021 | Pécsi MFC | 30 | (1) |
| 2021–2022 | Kecskemét | 17 | (1) |
| 2022–2023 | Kozármisleny | 36 | (4) |
| 2023– | Dunaföldvár | 11 | (6) |

International career
| 2002–2003 | Hungary U-16 | 6 | (2) |
| 2003–2004 | Hungary U-17 | | |
| 2005–2006 | Hungary U-19 | | |
- * Club domestic league appearances and goals as of 15 October 2023

László Bartha (born 9 February 1987) is a Hungarian football player who plays for Dunaföldvár.

== Club career ==
On 27 August 2021, Bartha moved to Kecskemét.

On 1 July 2022, Bartha returned to Kozármisleny.

== Career statistics ==
Appearances and goals by club, season and competition
| Club | Season | League | | | Cup | | League Cup | | Europe | | Total | |
| Club | Season | Division | Apps | Goals | Apps | Goals | Apps | Goals | Apps | Goals | Apps | Goals |
|---|---|---|---|---|---|---|---|---|---|---|---|---|
Ferencváros
| Ferencváros | 2004–05 | Nemzeti Bajnokság I | 9 | 2 | 1 | 0 | — | | 1 | 0 | 11 | 2 |
| Ferencváros | 2005–06 | Nemzeti Bajnokság I | 12 | 0 | 0 | 0 | — | | 0 | 0 | 12 | 0 |
| Ferencváros | 2006–07 | Nemzeti Bajnokság II | 26 | 8 | 5 | 0 | — | | — | | 31 | 8 |
| Ferencváros | 2007–08 | Nemzeti Bajnokság II | 24 | 3 | 2 | 2 | — | | — | | 26 | 5 |
| Ferencváros | 2008–09 | Nemzeti Bajnokság II | 5 | 0 | 2 | 1 | 3 | 0 | — | | 10 | 1 |
| Ferencváros | Total | | 76 | 13 | 10 | 3 | 3 | 0 | 1 | 0 | 90 | 16 |
Kozármisleny
| Kozármisleny | 2008–09 | Nemzeti Bajnokság II | 13 | 3 | 0 | 0 | — | | — | | 13 | 3 |
| Kozármisleny | 2009–10 | Nemzeti Bajnokság II | 14 | 4 | 2 | 1 | — | | — | | 16 | 5 |
| Kozármisleny | Total | | 27 | 7 | 2 | 1 | 0 | 0 | 0 | 0 | 29 | 8 |
Paks
| Paks | 2009–10 | Nemzeti Bajnokság I | 10 | 0 | 0 | 0 | 7 | 1 | — | | 17 | 1 |
| Paks | 2010–11 | Nemzeti Bajnokság I | 27 | 8 | 2 | 0 | 5 | 2 | — | | 34 | 10 |
| Paks | 2011–12 | Nemzeti Bajnokság I | 28 | 5 | 1 | 0 | 5 | 1 | 6 | 0 | 40 | 6 |
| Paks | 2012–13 | Nemzeti Bajnokság I | 26 | 2 | 2 | 0 | 5 | 0 | — | | 33 | 2 |
| Paks | 2013–14 | Nemzeti Bajnokság I | 29 | 5 | 0 | 0 | 3 | 1 | — | | 32 | 6 |
| Paks | 2014–15 | Nemzeti Bajnokság I | 30 | 8 | 1 | 0 | 4 | 2 | — | | 35 | 10 |
| Paks | 2015–16 | Nemzeti Bajnokság I | 31 | 5 | 0 | 0 | — | | — | | 31 | 5 |
| Paks | 2016–17 | Nemzeti Bajnokság I | 27 | 11 | 1 | 0 | — | | — | | 28 | 11 |
| Paks | 2017–18 | Nemzeti Bajnokság I | 25 | 7 | 2 | 1 | — | | — | | 27 | 8 |
| Paks | 2018–19 | Nemzeti Bajnokság I | 29 | 1 | 1 | 1 | — | | — | | 30 | 2 |
| Paks | 2019–20 | Nemzeti Bajnokság I | 11 | 0 | 0 | 0 | — | | — | | 11 | 0 |
| Paks | Total | | 273 | 52 | 10 | 2 | 29 | 7 | 6 | 0 | 318 | 61 |
| Career total | | | 373 | 72 | 22 | 6 | 32 | 7 | 7 | 0 | 434 | 85 |

Updated to games played as of 27 June 2020.
