= Thomas Sowunmi =

Hungarian footballer

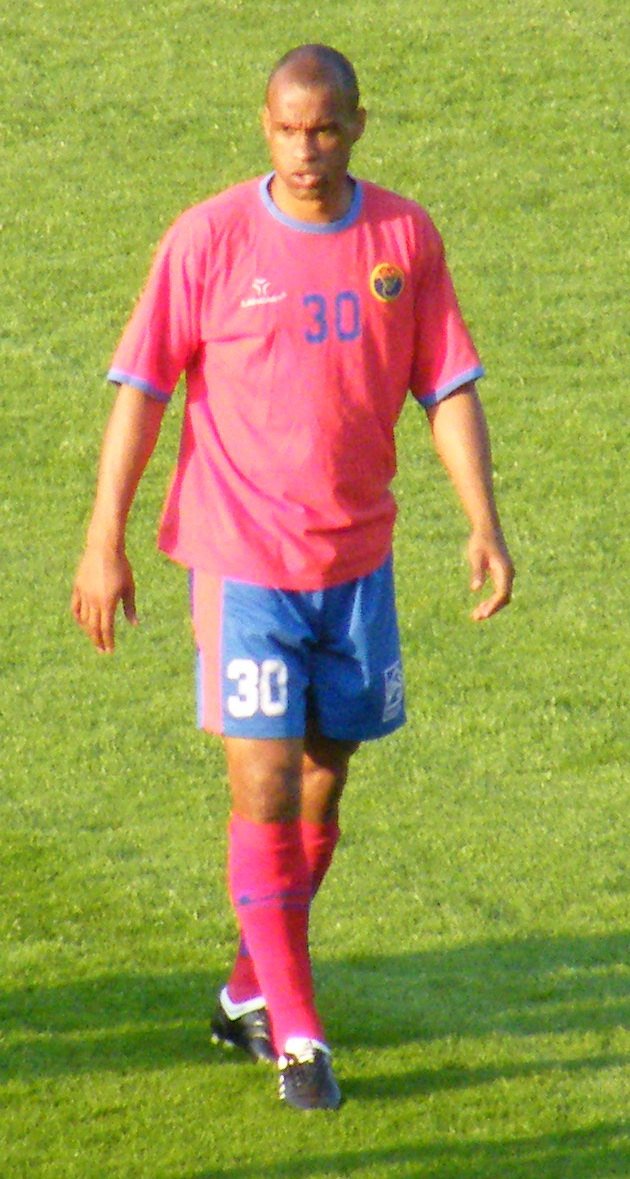

Personal information
- Full name: Thomas Babatunde Sowunmi
- Date of birth: 25 July 1978 (age 48)
- Place of birth: Lagos, Nigeria
- Height: 6 ft 0 in (1.83 m)
- Position: Striker

Senior career*
Years	Team	Apps	(Gls)
1997–1998	Dunaújváros	0	(0)
1998–2001	Vasas	84	(22)
2001–2002	Dunaújváros	34	(5)
2002	Ajaccio	0	(0)
2002–2003	Dunaújváros	11	(1)
2003–2005	Ferencváros	31	(7)
2005–2006	Slovacko	24	(4)
2006–2007	Hibernian	5	(0)
2007–2009	Vasas	46	(5)
2009–2010	Siófok	42	(15)
2010–2011	APOP	7	(1)
2011–2012	Siófok	28	(4)
2013–2016	Ajka	111	(29)

International career^{‡}
1996–1997	Hungary U-19	1	(0)
1996–1999	Hungary U-21	2	(0)
1999–2006	Hungary	10	(1)
- * Club domestic league appearances and goals as of 1 June 2014 ‡ National team caps and goals as of 1 February 2009

Thomas Sowunmi (born 25 July 1978) is a Hungarian retired footballer.

Sowunmi was born in Nigeria to a Hungarian mother and a Nigerian Yoruba father and spent the first nine years of his life in the African state. He started playing football aged 13 and began a professional football career with Dunaferr.

Sowunmi left for Vasas Budapest in 1998 but returned to his first club in 2001. He made his first appearance for Hungary in August 1999, in a 1–1 draw against Moldova. Sowunmi was the first person of color to represent Hungary at football. He spent a short spell in France with AC Ajaccio but returned to Hungary with Ferencvaros in 2003. He was signed by FC Slovacko in 2005 but after one season became involved in a dispute with the club. Eventually he was released from his attachment to the Czech team following police and FIFA intervention.

Sowunmi signed for Scottish club Hibernian on 6 February 2007 after impressing manager John Collins while on trial. In just his second match he came on as a half-time substitute in a Scottish Cup quarter-final tie at Queen of the South and scored the decisive goal in a 2–1 win. Sowunmi was released by Hibernian in June, and Sowunmi re-signed for Vasas Budapest in September 2007.
