= Zsolt Bognár (footballer) =

Hungarian footballer

Personal information
- Date of birth: 28 March 1979 (age 47)
- Place of birth: Csorna, Hungary
- Height: 1.84 m (6 ft 0 in)
- Position: Defender

Team information
- Current team: Kisvárda
- Number: 19

Senior career*
Years	Team	Apps	(Gls)
1998–1999	Szombathely	15	(0)
1999–2002	Győr	73	(1)
2002–2007	Ferencváros	59	(1)
2007–2008	Frosinone	13	(0)
2008–2009	Virtus	20	(0)
2009–2010	Diósgyőr	14	(1)
2011–2012	Gyirmót	41	(0)
2012–2014	Sopron	28	(0)
2014–	Kisvárda	1	(0)

International career
1999–2000	Hungary U-21	1	(0)
- * Club domestic league appearances and goals as of 1 March 2014

Zsolt Bognár (born 28 March 1979 in Csorna) is a Hungarian football player, he currently plays for Kisvárda Football Club.

== Club career ==
Zsolt Bognár started his football career with minor Hungarian teams, including Szombathelyi Haladás and Győri ETO. Zsolt was soon noticed by Ferencváros, the most renowned and successful team in Hungary.

In 2007, he transferred from Ferencváros to Italian Serie B club Frosinone, and made his debut in a 2–1 defeat to Lecce.
