= Kálmán Szabó =

Hungarian footballer

Personal information
- Full name: Kálmán Szabó
- Date of birth: 27 June 1980 (age 46)
- Place of birth: Budapest, Hungary
- Height: 1.93 m (6 ft 4 in)
- Position: Goalkeeper

Youth career
- 1989–2003: Ferencvárosi TC

Senior career*
Years	Team	Apps	(Gls)
2003–2004	Ferencvárosi TC	0	(0)
2004–2007ű6	Tatabánya FC	1	(0)
2006–2008	Ferencvárosi TC	3	(0)
2006	Ruch Chorzów	0	(0)
2009–2011	Szigetszentmiklósi TK	8	(0)

International career
N/A	Hungary	0	(0)
- * Club domestic league appearances and goals

Kálmán Szabó (born 27 June 1980 in Budapest) is a Hungarian football retired goalkeeper
