= Aleksandar Bajevski =

Macedonian international footballer

Personal information
- Full name: Aleksandar Bajevski
- Date of birth: 8 December 1979 (age 46)
- Place of birth: Skopje, SFR Yugoslavia
- Height: 1.82 m (6 ft 0 in)
- Position: Striker

Youth career
- 1986–1996: Vardar Skopje

Senior career*
Years	Team	Apps	(Gls)
1996–2002	Vardar	92	(20)
2002–2003	OFK Beograd	4	(1)
2003–2004	Győri ETO	28	(7)
2004	Balaton FC	12	(1)
2004–2006	Ferencváros	49	(15)
2006	Górnik Łęczna	8	(1)
2007	Al-Ahli Doha	12	(5)
2007–2008	KV Mechelen	8	(2)
2008–2009	Vardar	20	(6)
2009–2010	DAC Dunajská Streda	24	(3)
2010–2011	Flamurtari Vlorë	16	(2)
2011–2012	Pelita Jaya	19	(10)
2012	Radnički Niš	4	(0)
Total		316	(73)

International career
1996–1997	Macedonia U19		
1998–2001	Macedonia U21	8	(0)
2003–2005	Macedonia	5	(0)
- * Club domestic league appearances and goals

Aleksandar Bajevski (Macedonian: Александар Бајевски, born 8 December 1979) is a Macedonian former professional footballer who played as a striker.

== Club career ==
Born in Skopje, SR Macedonia, his previous clubs include OFK Beograd, Ferencváros, Al-Ahli Doha. Bajevski is a trainee of Vardar Skopje. At the beginning of March 2007, he was released from Górnik Łęczna on his own request. In 2007, he signed a contract with the Belgian team KV Mechelen. In the summer of 2012, he returned to Serbia and joined FK Radnički Niš.

== International career ==
He made his senior debut for Macedonia in a June 2003 European Championship qualification match against Liechtenstein and has earned a total of 5 caps, scoring no goals including 2006 FIFA World Cup qualification. His final international was a March 2005 FIFA World Cup qualification match against Romania.

== Honours ==
Vardar Skopje

- 1. MFL : 2001–02

Ferencvárosi

- Szuperkupa: 2004
