= 2010–11 Zalaegerszegi TE season =

Zalaegerszeg
2010–11 season
- Chairman: Ferenc Nagy
- Manager: János Csank
- Stadium: ZTE Arena
- Nemzeti Bajnokság I: 4th
- Magyar Kupa: Semi-finals
- Ligakupa: Semi-finals
- UEFA Europa League: First qualifying round
- Top goalscorer: League: Prince Rajcomar (9); All: Attila Simon (11)
- Highest home attendance: 8,086 v Ferencváros (6 November 2010, Nemzeti Bajnokság I)
- Lowest home attendance: 250 v Siófok (19 February 2011, Ligakupa)
- Average home league attendance: 3,216
- Biggest win: 6–0 v Vasas (Away, 10 November 2010, Magyar Kupa )
- Biggest defeat: 1–5 v Kecskemét (Away, 19 April 2011, Magyar Kupa)

The 2010–11 season was Zalaegerszegi Torna Egylet's 35th competitive season, 17th consecutive season in the Nemzeti Bajnokság I and 72nd season in existence as a football club. In addition to the domestic league, Zalaegerszeg participated in that season's editions of the Magyar Kupa, the Ligakupa and the UEFA Europa League.

== Squad ==
Squad at end of season

Note: Flags indicate national team as defined under FIFA eligibility rules; some limited exceptions apply. Players may hold more than one non-FIFA nationality.

No.	Pos.	Nation	Player
1	GK	(Hungary) HUN	Géza Vlaszák
2	DF	(Hungary) HUN	Gergely Kocsárdi
3	DF	(Serbia) SRB	Milan Bogunović
4	DF	(Hungary) HUN	Róbert Varga
5	FW	(Montenegro) MNE	Darko Pavićević
6	MF	(Croatia) CRO	Stefan Cebara
7	MF	(Serbia) SRB	Marko Milosavljević
8	MF	(Slovenia) SVN	Leon Panikvar
10	MF	(Montenegro) MNE	Ivan Delić
11	FW	(Latvia) LVA	Daniils Turkovs
12	GK	(Hungary) HUN	Ádám Szabó
13	MF	(Hungary) HUN	Zsolt Barna
14	MF	(Hungary) HUN	Tamás Szalai
15	FW	(Hungary) HUN	Attila Simon
16	DF	(Hungary) HUN	Balázs Nánási

No.	Pos.	Nation	Player
17	FW	(Hungary) HUN	Zsolt Balázs
18	DF	(Hungary) HUN	Gergő Kovács
19	MF	(Serbia) SRB	Đorđe Kamber
20	FW	(Serbia) SRB	Ahmet Delić
21	MF	(Hungary) HUN	András Horváth
22	DF	(Slovenia) SVN	Matej Miljatovič
23	GK	(Hungary) HUN	Gábor Sipos
25	FW	(Netherlands) NED	Prince Rajcomar
26	FW	(Hungary) HUN	Ádám Vittman
27	DF	(Hungary) HUN	Tamás Turcsik
28	DF	(Hungary) HUN	Adrián Kocsis
29	MF	(Hungary) HUN	Gábor Simonfalvi
—	GK	(Serbia) SRB	Aleksander Novaković
—	MF	(Austria) AUT	Emre Okatan

== Transfers ==
=== Transfers in ===
Transfer window	Pos.	No.	Player	From
Summer	DF	4	(Hungary) Róbert Varga	Videoton
Summer	MF	6	(Croatia) Stefan Cebara	(Serbia) Rad
Summer	MF	13	(Hungary) Zsolt Barna	MTK
Summer	FW	20	(Serbia) Ahmet Delić	(Austria) Ostbahn XI
Summer	FW	26	(Hungary) Ádám Vittman	Reserve team
Summer	DF	27	(Hungary) Tamás Turcsik	Reserve team
Summer	DF	28	(Hungary) Adrián Kocsis	Reserve team
Summer	MF	29	(Hungary) Gellért Ivancsics	Szigetszentmiklós
Winter	GK	–	(Serbia) Aleksander Novaković	Kaposvár
Winter	MF	–	(Austria) Emre Okatan	(Austria) SV St. Gallen
Winter	MF	7	(Serbia) Marko Milosavljević	Free agent
Winter	MF	10	(Montenegro) Ivan Delić	(Czech Republic) Mladá Boleslav
Winter	FW	11	(Latvia) Daniils Turkovs	(Latvia) Skonto
Winter	GK	12	(Hungary) Ádám Szabó	Bőcs
Winter	DF	16	(Hungary) Balázs Nánási	Nyíregyháza

=== Transfers out ===
Transfer window	Pos.	No.	Player	To
Summer	DF	–	(Hungary) Péter Péter	Ajka
Summer	FW	6	(Hungary) József Magasföldi	Paks
Summer	FW	11	(Latvia) Artjoms Rudņevs	(Poland) Lech Poznań
Summer	MF	20	(Slovakia) Marián Sluka	Released
Winter	MF	7	(Hungary) Gyula Illés	Debrecen
Winter	GK	12	(Hungary) Krisztián Pogacsics	(Romania) Bihor Oradea
Winter	MF	15	(Hungary) Márk Petneházi	Orosháza
Winter	MF	16	(Hungary) Péter Máté	Kaposvár

=== Loans in ===
Transfer window	Pos.	No.	Player	From	End date
Summer	FW	15	(Hungary) Attila Simon	Kecskemét	End of season (Note: He was on loan until the middle of season, and was loaned out again in the winter until the end of season.)
Winter	MF	29	(Hungary) Gábor Simonfalvi	Pécs	End of season

=== Loans out ===
Transfer window	Pos.	No.	Player	To	End date
Summer	MF	–	(Hungary) György Zsömlye	Szigetszentmiklós	Middle of season
Summer	MF	7	(Hungary) Gellért Ivancsics	Siófok	Middle of season
Summer	MF	15	(Hungary) Márk Petneházi	Orosháza	Middle of season
Winter	MF	–	(Hungary) György Zsömlye	Veszprém	End of season
Winter	MF	7	(Hungary) Gellért Ivancsics	Honvéd	End of season

== Competitions ==
=== Overview ===
Competition	First match	Last match	Starting round	Final position	Record							
Competition	First match	Last match	Starting round	Final position	Pld	W	D	L	GF	GA	GD	Win %
Nemzeti Bajnokság I	31 July 2010	22 May 2011	Matchday 1	4th	30	14	6	10	51	47	+4	46.67
Magyar Kupa	6 October 2010	3 May 2011	Round of 32	Semi-finals	7	4	2	1	14	7	+7	57.14
Ligakupa	19 February 2011	30 March 2011	Quarter-finals	Semi-finals	4	1	0	3	6	6	+0	25.00
UEFA Europa League	1 July 2010	8 July 2010	First qualifying round	First qualifying round	2	0	1	1	0	1	−1	0.00
Total					43	19	9	15	71	61	+10	44.19

Source: Competitions

=== Nemzeti Bajnokság I ===
==== League table ====
Pos	Team	Pld	W	D	L	GF	GA	GD	Pts	Qualification or relegation
2	Paks	30	17	5	8	54	37	+17	56	Qualification for Europa League first qualifying round
3	Ferencváros	30	15	5	10	50	43	+7	50	Qualification for Europa League first qualifying round
4	ZTE	30	14	6	10	51	47	+4	48	
5	Debrecen	30	12	10	8	53	43	+10	46	
6	Újpest	30	13	6	11	50	38	+12	45	

Source: soccerway.com
Rules for classification: 1st points; 2nd overall wins; 3rd goal difference; 4th goals scored

==== Results summary ====
Overall								Home						Away					
Pld	W	D	L	GF	GA	GD	Pts	W	D	L	GF	GA	GD	W	D	L	GF	GA	GD
30	14	6	10	51	47	+4	48	10	3	2	26	18	+8	4	3	8	25	29	−4

Source: Hungarian Football Federation

==== Results by round ====
Round	1	2	3	4	5	6	7	8	9	10	11	12	13	14	15	16	17	18	19	20	21	22	23	24	25	26	27	28	29	30
Ground	H	A	H	A	H	A	H	A	H	A	H	A	H	A	H	A	H	A	H	A	H	A	H	A	H	A	H	A	H	A
Result	L	D	W	D	W	L	L	W	W	W	W	W	W	L	W	L	D	L	W	L	W	L	D	L	W	L	W	D	D	W
Position	14	13	9	9	8	10	11	10	7	4	2	2	2	3	2	2	4	5	3	4	4	5	5	5	5	6	5	5	5	4
Points	0	1	4	5	8	8	8	11	14	17	20	23	26	26	29	29	30	30	33	33	36	36	37	37	40	40	43	44	45	48

Source: Matches
A = Away; H = Home; W = Win; D = Draw; L = Loss

==== Matches ====
31 July 2010 1	Zalaegerszeg	3–5	Kaposvár	Zalaegerszeg
19:00 CEST (UTC+2)	Rudņevs 45', 60'; G. Kovács (yellow card) 55'; Máté (yellow card) 64'; Z. Balázs 66'	Report	Pavlović 16', 59'; G. Kovács 28' (o.g.); Oláh 28'; Grúz 45'; B. Balázs (yellow card) 54'; Gujić (yellow card) 66'	Stadium: ZTE Arena; Attendance: 3,028; Referee: Tamás Bognár; Assistant referees: Oszkár Lémon, Balázs Huszár; Fourth official: Csaba Pintér

7 August 2010 2	Haladás	0–0	Zalaegerszeg	Szombathely
19:00 CEST (UTC+2)	Molnár (yellow card) 21'; Tóth (yellow card) 34'; Á. Simon (yellow card) 52'; Rajos (yellow card) 85'	Report	Panikvar (red card) 82'	Stadium: Rohonci út Attendance: 6,000; Referee: Álvaro García Miquel; Assistant referees: Vencel Tóth II, Tamás Péter; Fourth official: Gergely Szőts

13 August 2010 3	Zalaegerszeg	2–1	Pápa	Zalaegerszeg
19:00 CEST (UTC+2)	Pavićević 2', 30'	Report	Abwo 15'; Venczel (yellow card) 34'	Stadium: ZTE Arena; Attendance: 2,200; Referee: József Berger; Assistant referees: Attila Forgács, Balázs Kiss; Fourth official: Gábor Barna
Note: During the break, a huge thunderstorm hit the pitch and the surrounding area, the second half of the game was delayed by more than twenty minutes. Then, in the 60th minute, it started to rain again and the match was abandoned and replayed at a later date.

21 August 2010 4	Paks	2–2	Zalaegerszeg	Paks
19:00 CEST (UTC+2)	Montvai 29'; Sifter (yellow card) 40'; Kiss 43'	Report	Kamber 13'; G. Kovács (yellow card) 39'; Rajcomar 47', (yellow card) 47'; Bogunović (yellow card) 53'	Stadium: Fehérvári úti Stadion; Attendance: 1,500; Referee: Gábor Oláh; Assistant referees: László Viszokai, Zsolt Butkai; Fourth official: Szabolcs Fenyvesi

28 August 2010 5	Zalaegerszeg	2–1	Kecskemét	Zalaegerszeg
19:00 CEST (UTC+2)	Rajcomar 9', 73'; Kamber (yellow card) 17'; Bogunović (yellow card) 64'; Miljatovič (red card) 82'	Report	Rybánsky (red card) 66'; Némedi 83'	Stadium: ZTE Arena; Attendance: 2,500; Referee: Péter Solymosi; Assistant referees: Oszkár Lémon, Gábor Takács; Fourth official: Dávid Ákos

1 September 2010 3	Zalaegerszeg	3–1	Pápa	Zalaegerszeg
19:00 CEST (UTC+2)	Rajcomar 26'; Pavićević 42', 90', (yellow card) 84'	Report	Dlusztus (yellow card) 10'; Abwo 12'; Quintero (yellow card) 60'; Rebryk (yellow card) 75'	Stadium: ZTE Arena; Attendance: 2,500; Referee: Roland Veizer; Assistant referees: László Viszokai, Balázs Farkas; Fourth official: Tibor Farkas

11 September 2010 6	Honvéd	1–0	Zalaegerszeg	Budapest
15:00 CEST (UTC+2)	Dieng 22'; Kemenes (yellow card) 32'; Takács (yellow card) 57'; Danilo Cirino (yellow card) 83'	Report	Rajcomar (yellow card) 19'; Pavićević (yellow card) 32'; Szalai (red card) 38'; An. Horváth (yellow card) 81'; Bogunović (yellow card) 83'; Illés (yellow card) 90'; Máté (yellow card) 90'	Stadium: Bozsik József Stadion; Attendance: 1,000; Referee: István Vad; Assistant referees: György Ring, Vencel Tóth II; Fourth official: Katalin Kulcsár

25 September 2010 8	Győr	0–1	Zalaegerszeg	Győr
17:30 CEST (UTC+2)	Kiss (yellow card) 28'; Aleksidze (yellow card) 42'; Fehér (yellow card) 84'	Report	Kocsárdi (yellow card) 25'; Pavićević (yellow card) 43'; Illés (yellow card) 48'; Bogunović 85'	Stadium: ETO Park; Attendance: 2,500; Referee: István Vad; Assistant referees: György Ring, Oszkár Lémon; Fourth official: Szabolcs Fenyvesi

28 September 2010 7	Zalaegerszeg	1–2	Videoton	Zalaegerszeg
19:00 CEST (UTC+2)	Varga 37'; Kocsárdi (yellow card) 60'; Kamber (yellow card) 82'	Report	Polonkai 28'; Alves 83'	Stadium: ZTE Arena; Attendance: 2,264; Referee: Péter Solymosi; Assistant referees: Balázs Farkas, Gábor Takács; Fourth official: Dávid Ákos
Note: The match was originally scheduled for 11 September 2010, but was postponed due to heavy rain having left the pitch unplayable.

2 October 2010 9	Zalaegerszeg	2–1	Újpest	Zalaegerszeg
15:00 CEST (UTC+2)	Pavićević 8'; Máté (yellow card) 37'; Rajcomar 57'; Vlaszák (yellow card) 86'	Report	Rajczi (yellow card) 36', (goal) 87'; Matoš (yellow card) 50'	Stadium: ZTE Arena; Attendance: 4,115; Referee: Mihály Fábián; Assistant referees: Dr. Zsolt Varga, Gyula Ortó; Fourth official: Ádám Radványi

16 October 2010 10	Siófok	0–4	Zalaegerszeg	Siófok
17:00 CEST (UTC+2)	Graszl (yellow card) 42'; Kecskés (yellow card) 52'; Novák (yellow card) 80'	Report	Balázs 29'; Panikvar (yellow card) 53'; Miljatovič (yellow card) 57'; Simon 67'; Mogyorósi 72' (o.g.); Kamber 78'	Stadium: Révész Géza utcai Stadion; Attendance: 1,500; Referee: István Vad; Assistant referees: György Ring, Balázs Huszár; Fourth official: Csaba Pintér

22 October 2010 11	Zalaegerszeg	2–1	Vasas	Zalaegerszeg
19:00 CEST (UTC+2)	Rajcomar 72'; Miljatovič 90+2'	Report	Mileusnić 70'	Stadium: ZTE Arena; Attendance: 2,756; Referee: Gábor Oláh; Assistant referees: László Viszokai, Zoltán Kis; Fourth official: Gábor Barna

30 October 2010 12	MTK	3–4	Zalaegerszeg	Budapest
17:00 CEST (UTC+2)	Szatmári (yellow card) 42'; Könyves 53'; Vukmir (yellow card) 55'; Ladányi 64'; Eppel 84'	Report	Balázs 10', (yellow card) 59'; Simon (yellow card) 33', (goal) 34'; Rajcomar 42'; Panikvar (yellow card) 53', (goal) 90'	Stadium: Hidegkuti Nándor Stadion; Attendance: 500; Referee: Szabolcs Szilasi; Assistant referees: Attila Kelemen, Tamás Márkus; Fourth official: Szabolcs Fenyvesi

6 November 2010 13	Zalaegerszeg	2–1	Ferencváros	Zalaegerszeg
17:30 CET (UTC+1)	Balázs 4'; Panikvar (yellow card) 26'; Kamber (yellow card) 59'; A. Delić 89'; Horváth (yellow card) 90'; Varga (yellow card) 90+4'	Report	Miljković (yellow card) 21'; Rósa 64'; Csizmadia (yellow card) 67'; Maróti (yellow card) 88'	Stadium: ZTE Arena; Attendance: 8,086; Referee: Viktor Kassai; Assistant referees: Vencel Tóth II, Zsolt Butkai; Fourth official: Gergely Szőts

13 November 2010 14	Debrecen	2–1	Zalaegerszeg	Debrecen
15:00 CET (UTC+1)	R. Varga 6' (o.g.); Coulibaly 22'; J. Varga (yellow card) 31'; Dombi (yellow card) 90+2'	Report	Szalai (yellow card) 38'; Simon 52'; Rajcomar (yellow card) 67'; Panikvar (yellow card) 71'; Kamber (yellow card) 79'; Horváth (yellow card) 88'	Stadium: Oláh Gábor utcai Stadion; Attendance: 4,000; Referee: Zoltán Iványi; Assistant referees: István Albert, Attila Kelemen; Fourth official: Csaba Sándor

20 November 2010 15	Zalaegerszeg	2–1	Szolnok	Zalaegerszeg
16:00 CET (UTC+1)	Miljatovič 16'; Kamber 52'; Barna (yellow card) 90'	Report	Remili (yellow card) 25', (goal) 87'; Mile (yellow card) 34'; Koós (yellow card) 57'; Cornaci (yellow card) 67'; Pisanjuk (red card) 83'	Stadium: ZTE Arena; Attendance: 2,354; Referee: J. Zoltán Kovács; Assistant referees: László Viszokai, Zoltán Kis; Fourth official: Dániel Becséri

27 November 2010 16	Kaposvár	2–1	Zalaegerszeg	Kaposvár
16:00 CET (UTC+1)	Oláh 11'; Perić 13'; Hegedűs (yellow card) 16'; Okuka (yellow card) 28'	Report	Simon 1'; Varga (yellow card) 12'; Kamber (yellow card) 21'; Rajcomar (yellow card) 26'	Stadium: Rákóczi Stadion; Attendance: 3,000; Referee: Mihály Fábián; Assistant referees: Dr. Zsolt Varga, János Demeter; Fourth official: Róbert Nagy

26 February 2011 17	Zalaegerszeg	1–1	Haladás	Zalaegerszeg
16:00 CET (UTC+1)	Balázs 40'	Report	Kenesei 3'; Sipos (yellow card) 73'	Stadium: ZTE Arena; Attendance: 6,780; Referee: Sándor Andó-Szabó; Assistant referees: Balázs Farkas, Zsolt Butkai; Fourth official: J. Zoltán Kovács

5 March 2011 18	Pápa	4–3	Zalaegerszeg	Pápa
15:00 CET (UTC+1)	P. Takács 8', 63'; Šupić (yellow card) 58'; Marić 66', 86'	Report	Miljatovič (yellow card) 10'; Szalai (yellow card) 17'; Bogunović 24'; Rajcomar 29'; Panikvar (yellow card) 36'; Balázs 58', (yellow card) 68'; Vlaszák (yellow card) 65'; Simonfalvi (yellow card) 81'	Stadium: Perutz Stadion; Attendance: 1,500; Referee: Ádám Németh; Assistant referees: László Viszokai, Balázs Huszár; Fourth official: Gábor Péter Kovács

12 March 2011 19	Zalaegerszeg	1–0	Paks	Zalaegerszeg
17:30 CET (UTC+1)	Balázs (yellow card) 11'; Horváth 39'; Kovács (yellow card) 64'; Simonfalvi (yellow card) 70'; Kocsárdi (yellow card) 75'; Bogunović (yellow card) 81'	Report	Báló (yellow card) 58'	Stadium: ZTE Arena; Attendance: 2,416; Referee: J. Zoltán Kovács; Assistant referees: Péter Berettyán, Zsolt Márton; Fourth official: Gábor Barna

18 March 2011 20	Kecskemét	1–0	Zalaegerszeg	Kecskemét
17:00 CET (UTC+1)	Gyagya 35'; Čukić (yellow card) 63'; Rybánsky (yellow card) 86'	Report	Bogunović (yellow card) 34'; Vlaszák (red card) 50'; I. Delić (yellow card) 87'	Stadium: Széktói Stadion; Attendance: 1,800; Referee: Mihály Fábián; Assistant referees: Dr. Zsolt Varga, Tamás Márkus; Fourth official: Balázs Böcskei

2 April 2011 21	Zalaegerszeg	2–1	Honvéd	Zalaegerszeg
17:30 CEST (UTC+2)	Kocsárdi (yellow card) 20'; Turkovs 52'; Kamber (yellow card) 81', (goal) 85'; Panikvar (yellow card) 85'	Report	Akassou (yellow card) 22', (goal) 87'; Ad. Horváth (yellow card) 53'; Hajdú (red card) 64'	Stadium: ZTE Arena; Attendance: 2,418; Referee: Ádám Németh; Assistant referees: Oszkár Lémon, Gábor Takács; Fourth official: Dániel Becséri

8 April 2011 22	Videoton	3–0	Zalaegerszeg	Székesfehérvár
19:00 CEST (UTC+2)	Vasiljević 72'; Alves 82', 90+2', (yellow card) 90+2'	Report	Panikvar (yellow card) 27'; Kamber (yellow card) 72'; Miljatovič (yellow card) 73'; Varga (red card) 76'; Vlaszák (red card) 80'	Stadium: Sóstói Stadion; Attendance: 4,538; Referee: Zoltán Iványi; Assistant referees: Zsolt Szpisják, Vencel Tóth II; Fourth official: József Erdős

16 April 2011 23	Zalaegerszeg	1–1	Győr	Zalaegerszeg
17:30 CEST (UTC+2)	Balázs (yellow card) 39'; Ganugrava 47' (o.g.)	Report	Völgyi (yellow card) 63', (goal) 79'; Fomumbod (red card) 71'; Totadze (yellow card) 74'; Ganugrava (yellow card) 79'	Stadium: ZTE Arena; Attendance: 2,038; Referee: István Vad; Assistant referees: Róbert Kispál, Balázs Farkas; Fourth official: Gábor Péter Kovács

22 April 2011 24	Újpest	4–2	Zalaegerszeg	Budapest
19:00 CEST (UTC+2)	Pollák (yellow card) 23'; Ahjupera 38', 85', (yellow card) 90+2'; Lázár 46'; Balogh 49'; Balajti (yellow card) 52'; Takács (yellow card) 61'	Report	Rajcomar 66'; I. Delić 88'	Stadium: Szusza Ferenc Stadion; Attendance: 3,247; Referee: Zsolt Szabó; Assistant referees: Vencel Tóth II, István Tóth; Fourth official: Tibor Farkas

27 April 2011 25	Zalaegerszeg	2–1	Siófok	Zalaegerszeg
18:00 CEST (UTC+2)	Kocsárdi (yellow card) 12'; Turkovs 15'; Simon 54'; Bogunović (red card) 64'	Report	Isaac (yellow card) 25'; Ludánszki (yellow card) 53'; Csordás 64'; Tusori (yellow card) 72'; Novák (yellow card) 77'	Stadium: ZTE Arena; Attendance: 2,038; Referee: Sándor Andó-Szabó; Assistant referees: György Ring, Balázs Huszár; Fourth official: Csaba Pintér

30 April 2011 26	Vasas	2–0	Zalaegerszeg	Budapest
15:00 CEST (UTC+2)	Lisztes 38'; Kulcsár (yellow card) 39'; Mileusnić (yellow card) 51'; Ponczók 64'	Report	Panikvar (yellow card) 78'	Stadium: Illovszky Rudolf Stadion; Attendance: 2,500; Referee: Ádám Farkas; Assistant referees: Péter Berettyán, Róbert Horváth; Fourth official: Eszter Urbán

6 May 2011 27	Zalaegerszeg	1–0	MTK	Zalaegerszeg
19:00 CEST (UTC+2)	Turkovs 57'; I. Delić (yellow card) 68'; Kovács (yellow card) 84'	Report	Gál (yellow card) 4'; Pál (yellow card) 73'	Stadium: ZTE Arena; Attendance: 1,800; Referee: Mihály Fábián; Assistant referees: Tamás Márkus, Gábor Takács; Fourth official: Krisztián Pánczél

10 May 2011 28	Ferencváros	4–4	Zalaegerszeg	Budapest
20:00 CEST (UTC+2)	Abdi (yellow card) 25'; Schembri 35', 83'; Pölöskei 55', (yellow card) 89'; Morales (yellow card) 69'; Csizmadia (yellow card) 74'; Heinz 75'	Report	Szalai 16', (yellow card) 60'; Balázs 18'; Turkovs 28', (yellow card) 29'; Kamber 39', (yellow card) 42'; Simonfalvi (yellow card) 69'	Stadium: Stadion Albert Flórián; Attendance: 3,500; Referee: Viktor Kassai; Assistant referees: Gábor Erős, György Ring; Fourth official: Gábor Oláh

13 May 2011 29	Zalaegerszeg	1–1	Debrecen	Zalaegerszeg
19:00 CEST (UTC+2)	Bogunović (yellow card) 33'; Kamber (yellow card) 44'; Panikvar (yellow card) 65'; Miljatovič (yellow card) 68'; Ramos 71' (o.g.)	Report	Nagy (yellow card) 51'; Bódi 69'; Ramos (yellow card) 90'	Stadium: ZTE Arena; Attendance: 3,158; Referee: Zsolt Szabó; Assistant referees: Róbert Kispál, László Viszokai; Fourth official: Gábor Barna

22 May 2011 30	Szolnok	1–3	Zalaegerszeg	Szolnok
17:30 CEST (UTC+2)	Jokić (yellow card) 28'; Miličić 53'	Report	Kamber 21', (yellow card) 38'; Miljatovič (yellow card) 39'; Balázs 41'; Máté 61' (o.g.); Horváth (yellow card) 72'; Varga (yellow card) 79'	Stadium: Tiszaligeti Stadion; Attendance: 500; Referee: Ádám Radványi; Assistant referees: Lajos L. Tóth, Dr. Judit Kulcsár; Fourth official: Csaba Sándor

=== Magyar Kupa ===
6 October 2010 Round of 32	Honvéd II	1–2	Zalaegerszeg	Budapest
14:30 CEST (UTC+2)	Bajner 75'; G. Nagy (yellow card) 84'	Report	Balázs 3'; Horváth 48'; Turcsik (red card) 50'	Stadium: Bozsik József Stadion; Attendance: 500; Referee: Csaba Pintér; Assistant referees: Krisztián Király, Balázs Huszár

==== Round of 16 ====
10 November 2010 First leg	Vasas	0–6	Zalaegerszeg	Budapest
17:00 CET (UTC+1)	Pavičević (yellow card) 29'; Hrepka (yellow card) 39'; Beliczky (yellow card) 70'	Report	Delić 14'; Simon 25', 69', 83'; Illés (yellow card) 55'; Kamber 61'; Szalai 86'	Stadium: Illovszky Rudolf Stadion; Attendance: 500; Referee: Álvaro García Miquel; Assistant referees: Zsolt Szpisják, Tibor Vígh

2 March 2011 Second leg	Zalaegerszeg	3–0 (9–0 agg.)	Vasas	Zalaegerszeg
14:00 CET (UTC+1)	Simon 3', 10'; Cebara 39'; Barna (yellow card) 67'	Report	Matolcsi (yellow card) 30'	Stadium: ZTE Arena; Attendance: 700; Referee: Eszter Urbán; Assistant referees: Attila Kelemen, István Tóth
Note: Zalaegerszeg won 9–0 on aggregate.

==== Quarter-finals ====
8 March 2011 First leg	MTK	0–0	Zalaegerszeg	Budapest
18:00 CET (UTC+1)		Report	Miljatovič (yellow card) 22'; Szalai (yellow card) 44'; Kovács (yellow card) 75'	Stadium: Hidegkuti Nándor Stadion; Attendance: 300; Referee: István Vad; Assistant referees: István Albert, Zsolt Szpisják

15 March 2011 Second leg	Zalaegerszeg	2–1 (2–1 agg.)	MTK	Zalaegerszeg
17:00 CET (UTC+1)	A. Delić (yellow card) 30', (goal) 36'; Simonfalvi (yellow card) 47'; Turkovs 48'; Miljatovič (yellow card) 85'; Kovács (yellow card) 90'	Report	Vukmir (yellow card) 23'; Könyves 43'; Szekeres (yellow card) 71'; Pál (yellow card) 88'	Stadium: ZTE Arena; Attendance: 5,200; Referee: Viktor Kassai; Assistant referees: Gábor Erős, Dániel Szalai
Note: Zalaegerszeg won 2–1 on aggregate.

==== Semi-finals ====
19 April 2011 First leg	Kecskemét	5–1	Zalaegerszeg	Kecskemét
18:00 CEST (UTC+2)	Kéthévoama 7', 89'; Tököli 18'; Litsingi 29', 34'; Alempijević (yellow card) 51'; Ebala (yellow card) 69'	Report	Turkovs (yellow card) 20'; Varga (yellow card) 42'; Balázs (yellow card) 62'; Szalai (yellow card) 75'; Kamber 79'	Stadium: Széktói Stadion; Attendance: 2,200; Referee: Álvaro García Miquel; Assistant referees: György Ring, Vencel Tóth II; Fourth official: Gyöngyi Gaál

3 May 2011 Second leg	Zalaegerszeg	0–0 (1–5 agg.)	Kecskemét	Zalaegerszeg
17:00 CEST (UTC+2)	I. Delić (yellow card) 54'	Report	Gyagya (yellow card) 65'	Stadium: ZTE Arena; Attendance: 800; Referee: Gyöngyi Gaál; Assistant referees: László Viszokai, Balázs Farkas; Fourth official: Gábor Péter Kovács
Note: Kecskemét won 5–1 on aggregate.

=== Ligakupa ===
==== Knockout phase ====
===== Quarter-finals =====
19 February 2011 First leg	Zalaegerszeg	0–2	Siófok	Zalaegerszeg
13:00 CET (UTC+1)	Bogunović (yellow card) 45'; An. Horváth (yellow card) 56'; Kovács (yellow card) 90+1'	Report	Mogyorósi (yellow card) 29'; Turcsik 31' (o.g.); Délczeg (yellow card) 52', (goal) 58'; Melczer (yellow card) 84'	Stadium: ZTE Arena; Attendance: 250; Referee: Gábor Oláh; Assistant referees: Zsolt Márton, Gábor Kovács II

22 February 2011 Second leg	Siófok	0–4 (2–4 agg.)	Zalaegerszeg	Siófok
13:00 CET (UTC+1)	Fehér (yellow card) 30'	Report	An. Horváth 16'; Cebara 32'; Kocsárdi (yellow card) 52'; Panikvar (yellow card) 80'; A. Delić 83'; Simon 88'	Stadium: Balatoni Vasas SE Sportpálya; Attendance: 50; Referee: Gyöngyi Gaál; Assistant referees: Zsolt Butkai, Zoltán Bozó
Note: Zalaegerszeg won 4–2 on aggregate.

===== Semi-finals =====
26 March 2011 First leg	Zalaegerszeg	1–2	Paks	Zalaegerszeg
16:30 CET (UTC+1)	A. Delić 23'; Simon (yellow card) 43'	Report	Magasföldi 9', (yellow card) 71'; Gévay 67'; J. Szabó (yellow card) 73'; Báló (red card) 75'	Stadium: ZTE Arena; Attendance: 1,224; Referee: Gábor Oláh; Assistant referees: Vencel Tóth II, Balázs Huszár

30 March 2011 Second leg	Paks	2–1 (4–2 agg.)	Zalaegerszeg	Paks
18:00 CEST (UTC+2)	Magasföldi 19'; Montvai 64'	Report	Kovács (yellow card) 21'; Panikvar (yellow card) 23'; Kamber 73'	Stadium: Fehérvári úti Stadion; Attendance: 500; Referee: Roland Veizer; Assistant referees: Róbert Horváth, Zoltán Iványi
Note: Paks won 4–2 on aggregate.

=== UEFA Europa League ===
==== Qualifying rounds ====
===== First qualifying round =====
1 July 2010 First leg	Tirana (Albania)	0–0	(Hungary) Zalaegerszeg	Tirana, Albania (Note: Played in Tirana at the Qemal Stafa Stadium as Tirana's Selman Stërmasi Stadium did not meet UEFA requirements.)
17:30 CEST (UTC+2)	Lila (yellow card) 53'	Report	Máté (yellow card) 43'; Kamber (yellow card) 74'	Stadium: Qemal Stafa Stadium; Attendance: 1,854; Referee: Raymond Crangle (Northern Ireland); Assistant referees: Thomas Fairfield (Northern Ireland), Dan Steele (Northern Ireland); Fourth official: David Malcolm (Northern Ireland)

8 July 2010 Second leg	Zalaegerszeg (Hungary)	0–1 (a.e.t.) (0–1 agg.)	(Albania) Tirana	Zalaegerszeg, Hungary
19:00 CEST (UTC+2)	Panikvar (yellow card) 33'; Illés (yellow card) 87'; Miljatovič (yellow card) 90+2'	Report	Plaku (penalty missed) 90+3', (yellow card) 119'; Karabeci 107'	Stadium: ZTE Arena; Attendance: 4,000; Referee: Ilias Spathas (Greece); Assistant referees: Spyridon Tryfonas (Greece), Grigorios Panou (Greece); Fourth official: Vassilios Pamporidis (Greece)
Note: Tirana won 1–0 on aggregate.

== Statistics ==
=== Overall ===
Appearances (Apps) numbers are for appearances in competitive games only, including sub appearances.
Source: Competitions

No.	Player	Pos.	Nemzeti Bajnokság I				Magyar Kupa				Ligakupa				UEFA Europa League				Total			
No.	Player	Pos.	Apps	Goal	Booked	Sent off (straight red)	Apps	Goal	Booked	Sent off (straight red)	Apps	Goal	Booked	Sent off (straight red)	Apps	Goal	Booked	Sent off (straight red)	Apps	Goal	Booked	Sent off (straight red)
1	(Hungary) Géza Vlaszák	GK	27		2	2	4				3				2				36		2	2
2	(Hungary) Gergely Kocsárdi	DF	22		5		4				3		1		2				31		6	
3	(Serbia) Milan Bogunović	DF	17	2	6	1	4				1		1		2				24	2	7	1
4	(Hungary) Róbert Varga	DF	18	1	3	1	3		1		2								23	1	4	1
5	(Montenegro) Darko Pavićević	FW	8	3	3										2				10	3	3	
6	(Croatia) Stefan Cebara	MF	2				3	1			1	1							6	2		
6	(Hungary) József Magasföldi	FW	2												2				4			
7	(Hungary) Gyula Illés	MF	14		2		2		1						2		1		18		4	
7	(Hungary) Gellért Ivancsics	MF																				
8	(Slovenia) Leon Panikvar	MF	26	1	9	1	5				4		2		2		1		37	1	12	1
10	(Montenegro) Ivan Delić	MF	11	1	2		2		1		2								15	1	3	
11	(Latvia) Artjoms Rudņevs	FW	1	2											1				2	2		
11	(Latvia) Daniils Turkovs	FW	13	4	1		3	1	1		1								17	5	2	
12	(Hungary) Krisztián Pogacsics	GK																				
12	(Hungary) Ádám Szabó	GK																				
13	(Hungary) Zsolt Barna	MF	6		1		2		1		2								10		2	
14	(Hungary) Tamás Szalai	MF	27	1	3	1	6	1	2		4				1				38	2	5	1
15	(Hungary) Attila Simon	FW	21	5	1		6	5			4	1	1						31	11	2	
16	(Hungary) Péter Máté	MF	9		3		1								2		1		12		4	
16	(Hungary) Balázs Nánási	DF																				
17	(Hungary) Zsolt Balázs	FW	23	8	4		7	1	1		4				1				35	9	5	
18	(Hungary) Gergő Kovács	DF	18		4		5		2		4		2		1				28		8	
19	(Serbia) Đorđe Kamber	MF	29	6	10		7	2			4	1			2		1		42	9	11	
20	(Serbia) Ahmet Delić	FW	17	1			6	2	1		4	2							27	5	1	
21	(Hungary) András Horváth	MF	29	1	4		7	1			4	1	1		2				42	3	5	
22	(Slovenia) Matej Miljatovič	DF	28	2	5	1	7		2		4				2		1		41	2	8	1
23	(Hungary) Gábor Sipos	GK	4				3				1								8			
25	(Netherlands) Prince Rajcomar	FW	27	9	4		3				4				2				36	9	4	
26	(Hungary) Ádám Vittman	FW	2																2			
27	(Hungary) Tamás Turcsik	DF	6				2			1	1								9			1
28	(Hungary) Adrián Kocsis	DF	1				2												3			
29	(Hungary) Gábor Simonfalvi	MF	12		3		3		1		1								16		4	
Own goals				4																4		
Totals				51	75	7		14	14	1		6	8				5			71	102	8

=== Hat-tricks ===
No.	Player	Against	Result	Date	Competition
11	(Hungary) Attila Simon	Vasas (A)	6–0	10 November 2010	Magyar Kupa

=== Clean sheets ===
			Clean sheets				
No.	Player	Games Played	Nemzeti Bajnokság I	Magyar Kupa	Ligakupa	UEFA Europa League	Total
1	(Hungary) Géza Vlaszák	36	5	2	1	1	9
23	(Hungary) Gábor Sipos	8	1	2			3
12	(Hungary) Krisztián Pogacsics	0					0
12	(Hungary) Ádám Szabó	0					0
Totals			6	4	1	1	12
