= List of Zalaegerszegi TE players =

This is a list of Zalaegerszegi TE players.

== A, Á ==
- Szilveszter Ágoston
- Kemal Alomerović
- Péter Andorka
- György Andris
- János Antoni
- Arany László

== B ==
- Djordje Babalj
- Ferenc Babati
- István Bagó
- F. Csongor Balázs
- Zsolt Balázs 1981–1988
- Zsolt Balázs
- Csaba Balog
- Tamás Balogh
- Zoltán Balogh
- Gábor Bardi
- Sándor Barna
- Zsolt Barna
- István Barta
- János Belák
- Péter Belső
- Péter Bencze
- Ádám Billege
- Klemen Bingo
- József Bita
- Attila Bogáti
- Milan Bogunović
- Saša Bogunović
- Ivan Bojović
- János Bolemányi
- Liviu Bonchiş
- Sorin Botis
- József Bozsik
- István Bölcsföldi
- Igor Budiša
- Gregor Bunc
- Tamás Burányi

== C, Cs ==
- Cornel Caşolţan
- Ferenc Cupik
- Czigány Csaba
- András Csepregi
- László Csepregi
- Zsolt Csóka

== D ==
- Milan Davidov
- Gergely Délczeg
- László Déri
- Ciprian Dianu
- Mahamadou Diawara
- Marko Djorović
- Lajos Dobány
- Andrej Doblajnszkij
- Sándor Dobos
- Károly Dombai
- László Dóri
- Juraj Dovičovič
- Ivan Dudić
- József Durgó

== E, É ==
- István Ebedli
- Gábor Egressy

== F ==
- István Faragó
- Csaba Farkas
- Lajos Farkas
- I Imre Fehér
- II Imre Fehér
- István Fehér
- István Ferenczi
- Attila Filó
- László Filó
- László Floid
- József Fodor
- Ivica Francišković
- Ferenc Fujsz

== G, Gy ==
- László Gaál
- Miklós Gaál
- Tibor Galántai
- Géza Gáspár
- Gyula Gáspár
- István Gáspár
- László Gáspár
- István Gass
- Primož Gliha
- László Guti
- Szabolcs Gyánó
- Barnabás Györe
- István Győrfi
- Zoltán Győri

== H ==
- Adrián Hadár
- Norbert Hajdú
- László Halápi
- András Horváth
- Attila Horváth
- Győző Horváth
- Gyula Horváth
- József Horváth
- Imre Huszár

== I, Í ==
- Saša Ilić
- Gyula Illés
- László Ivanics

== J ==
- Ivan Janjić
- György Józsi, Sr.
- György Józsi

== K ==
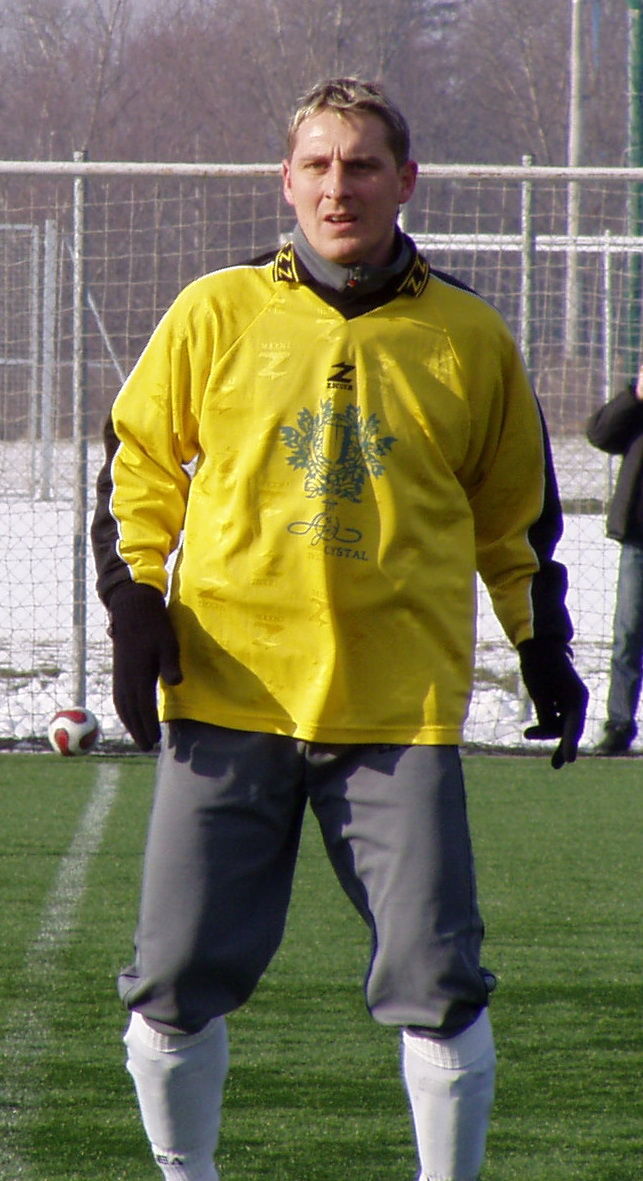
András Kaj in 2009

- Tamás Kádár
- András Kaj
- Gyula Kajtár
- Norbert Kállai
- Attila Kámán
- Đorđe Kamber
- Darius Kampa
- József Kanász
- László Kelemen
- Sándor Kelemen
- Krisztián Kenesei
- Zoltán Kereki
- István Kerkai
- József Kerkai
- Jenő Kertész
- Ödön Kertész
- Krisztián Kiss
- Gergely Kocsárdi
- Adrián Kocsis
- Tamás Kocsis
- László Konrád
- László Kónya
- László Kópicz
- Béla Koplárovics
- György Kottán
- Krisztián Kottán
- Gyula Kovács
- József Kovács
- László Kovács
- Norbert Kovács
- Sándor Kovács
- Ladislav Kozmér
- Radoslav Král
- Attila Kriston
- András Kütsön

== L ==
- István Lang
- József Lang
- András László
- Rajko Lekic
- Miklós Lendvai
- Martin Lipcák
- Darko Ljubojević
- Géza Löwi
- István Ludánszki
- Tihamér Lukács

== M ==
- Gábor Madár
- József Magasföldi
- Árpád Majoros
- Imre Marancsics
- Ferenc Márkus
- Péter Máté
- Roguy Méyé
- István Mihalecz
- Péter Mihalecz
- Árpád Milinte
- Sándor Milley
- Matej Miljatovič
- Igor Mirčeta
- Gábor Mogyoródi
- Attila Molnár
- Balázs Molnár
- László Molnár
- Tamás Molnár
- Tibor Montvai
- Tamás Móri

== N ==
- Attila Nagy
- Csaba Nagy
- Imre Nagy
- Lajos Nagy
- László Nagy
- Tamás Nagy
- József Németh
- István Németh
- Péter Németh
- Tamás Németh
- Julis Nota

== O, Ó, Ö, Ő ==
- Balázs Osbáth
- Alika Henry Osadolor

== P ==
- András Páli
- Attila Páli
- Leon Panikvar
- Antal Papp
- Zoltán Papp
- Lajos Pásztor
- Darko Pavicević
- Tibor Pecsics
- Damir Pekič
- Darko Perić
- István Pete
- Zoltán Péter
- Márk Petneházi
- István Petrik
- Viktor Petrók
- Dániel Pintér
- Krisztián Pogacsics
- Peter Polgár
- Sándor Preisinger
- Károly Prokisch

== R ==
- István Rácz
- Prince Rajcomar
- Vilmos Rajkai
- Besnik Ramadani
- Ferenc Róth
- László Rózsa
- Artjoms Rudņevs

== S, Sz ==
- Radu Sabo
- Gábor Sági
- Zoltán Sámson
- Levente Schultz
- József Sebők
- Vilmos Sebők
- András Selei
- Károly Simon
- Gábor Simonfalvi
- Gábor Sipos
- Sándor Sipos
- Marián Sluka
- Csaba Somfalvi
- István Soós
- László Strasser
- Csaba Szabó
- György Szabó
- Rezső Szabó
- Zoltán Szabó
- I Zsolt Szabó
- II Zsolt Szabó
- Tamás Szalai
- Tamás Szamosi
- Zoltán Szekeres
- András Szigeti
- Tibor Szimacsek
- Lázár Szentes
- Szabolcs Szijártó
- János Szőcs
- Péter Szőke
- Darko Szpalevics
- Bojan Szpaszoljevics
- Barnabás Sztipánovics
- Imre Szűcs

== T, Ty ==
- Jenő Takács
- András Telek
- Nenad Todorović
- Antal Topor
- Gábor Torma
- Gyula Tóth
- József Tóth
- Norbert Tóth
- Zoltán Tóth
- József Török
- Milutin Trnavac
- Géza Turi

== U,Ú, Ü, Ű ==
- Tamás Udvari
- Flórián Urbán

== V ==
- Imre Vadász
- János Vámos
- István Varga
- Róbert Varga
- Tamás Varga
- Zoltán Varga
- Zoltán Vasas
- Pál Vigh
- Ottó Vincze
- Géza Vlaszák
- István Vörös
- Lovre Vulin

== W ==
- Róbert Waltner
- Géza Wittmann

== Z, Zs ==
- Imad Zatara
- Sándor Zsömbölyi
- György Zsömlye
