= 2008–09 Zalaegerszegi TE season =

Zalaegerszeg
2008–09 season
- Chairman: Ferenc Nagy
- Manager: Attila Supka (until 9 October 2008); János Csank (from 10 October 2008)
- Stadium: ZTE Arena
- Nemzeti Bajnokság I: 4th
- Magyar Kupa: Third round
- Ligakupa: Group stage
- Top goalscorer: League: Róbert Waltner (15); All: Róbert Waltner (16)
- Highest home attendance: 8,857 v Haladás (15 November 2008, Nemzeti Bajnokság I)
- Lowest home attendance: 100 v Pécs (29 November 2008, Ligakupa)
- Average home league attendance: 4,344
- Biggest win: 5–0 v Dunaújváros (Home, 1 October 2008, Ligakupa)
- Biggest defeat: 0–5 v Kaposvár (Home, 26 November 2008, Ligakupa); 2–7 v Győr (Home, 28 April 2009, Nemzeti Bajnokság I)

The 2008–09 season was Zalaegerszegi Torna Egylet's 33rd competitive season, 15th consecutive season in the Nemzeti Bajnokság I and 69th season in existence as a football club. In addition to the domestic league, Zalaegerszeg participated in that season's editions of the Magyar Kupa and the Ligakupa.

== Squad ==
Squad at end of season

Note: Flags indicate national team as defined under FIFA eligibility rules; some limited exceptions apply. Players may hold more than one non-FIFA nationality.

No.	Pos.	Nation	Player
1	GK	HUN	Géza Vlaszák
2	DF	HUN	Gergely Kocsárdi
3	DF	HUN	Róbert Varga
4	DF	HUN	Tamás Szamosi
5	FW	MNE	Darko Pavićević
6	DF	ROU	Sorin Botiș
7	MF	HUN	Gyula Illés
8	MF	HUN	Zoltán Tóth
9	FW	HUN	Róbert Waltner
10	MF	HUN	Norbert Hajdú
11	FW	LAT	Artjoms Rudņevs
12	GK	HUN	Krisztián Pogacsics
14	MF	MKD	Kemal Alomerović
15	MF	HUN	Márk Petneházi
16	MF	HUN	Péter Máté

No.	Pos.	Nation	Player
17	FW	HUN	Zsolt Balázs
18	DF	HUN	Gergő Kovács
19	MF	HUN	Tihamér Lukács
20	MF	SVK	Marián Sluka
21	DF	NGR	Henry Osadolor
22	DF	SLO	Matej Miljatovič
23	GK	HUN	Gábor Sipos
24	FW	HUN	Gergely Délczeg
25	MF	HUN	Csaba Ferkó
26	MF	HUN	György Zsömlye
29	MF	HUN	András Horváth I
30	MF	HUN	András Horváth II
—	MF	HUN	Ádám Csutak
—	FW	HUN	Tamás Burányi

== Competitions ==
=== Overview ===
Competition	First match	Last match	Starting round	Final position	Record							
Competition	First match	Last match	Starting round	Final position	Pld	W	D	L	GF	GA	GD	Win %
Nemzeti Bajnokság I	26 July 2008	30 May 2009	Matchday 1	4th	30	15	7	8	52	44	+8	50.00
Magyar Kupa	3 September 2008	3 September 2008	Third round	Third round	1	0	0	1	1	2	−1	0.00
Ligakupa	1 October 2008	14 February 2009	Group stage	Group stage	10	4	1	5	15	15	+0	40.00
Total					41	19	8	14	68	61	+7	46.34

Source: Competitions

=== Nemzeti Bajnokság I ===
==== League table ====
Pos	Team	Pld	W	D	L	GF	GA	GD	Pts	Qualification or relegation
2	Újpest	30	17	8	5	61	38	+23	59	Qualification for Europa League second qualifying round
3	Haladás	30	16	5	9	44	29	+15	53	Qualification for Europa League first qualifying round
4	Zalaegerszeg	30	15	7	8	52	44	+8	52	
5	Kecskemét	30	14	6	10	55	44	+11	48	
6	Fehérvár	30	14	6	10	42	34	+8	48	

Source: soccerway.com
Rules for classification: 1st points; 2nd overall wins; 3rd goal difference; 4th goals scored

==== Results summary ====
Overall								Home						Away					
Pld	W	D	L	GF	GA	GD	Pts	W	D	L	GF	GA	GD	W	D	L	GF	GA	GD
30	15	7	8	52	44	+8	52	10	4	1	31	21	+10	5	3	7	21	23	−2

Source: Hungarian Football Federation

==== Results by round ====
Round	1	2	3	4	5	6	7	8	9	10	11	12	13	14	15	16	17	18	19	20	21	22	23	24	25	26	27	28	29	30
Ground	A	H	A	H	A	H	A	H	A	A	H	A	H	A	H	H	A	H	A	H	A	H	A	H	H	A	H	A	H	A
Result	L	W	W	D	L	W	L	D	L	L	W	D	D	W	W	W	L	W	W	D	W	W	D	W	L	D	W	L	W	W
Position	12	7	4	6	9	6	8	8	12	13	10	11	11	9	6	5	6	6	6	5	4	3	3	3	3	4	4	4	4	4
Points	0	3	6	7	7	10	10	11	11	11	14	15	16	19	22	25	25	28	31	32	35	38	39	42	42	43	46	46	49	52

Source: Matches
A = Away; H = Home; W = Win; D = Draw; L = Loss

==== Matches ====
26 July 2008 1	Debrecen	2–1	Zalaegerszeg	Debrecen
15:00 CEST (UTC+2)	Rudolf 38' (pen.), 66'; Bernáth (yellow card) 69'; Czvitkovics (yellow card) 76'	Report	Waltner 21' (pen.), (yellow card) 51'; Trnavac (yellow card) 38'	Stadium: Oláh Gábor utcai Stadion; Attendance: 4,500; Referee: Viktor Kassai; Assistant referees: Gábor Erős, János Medovarszki; Fourth official: Gergő Janitz

2 August 2008 2	Zalaegerszeg	1–0	Kecskemét	Zalaegerszeg
20:00 CEST (UTC+2)	Zsömlye (yellow card) 32'; Méyé 40'; Sluka (red card) 85'	Report	Koszó (red card) 38'; Grkinić (yellow card) 47'; Savić (red card) 55'	Stadium: ZTE Arena; Attendance: 5,000; Referee: Krisztián Király; Assistant referees: Zoltán Kovács, Balázs Huszár; Fourth official: Csaba Pintér

9 August 2008 3	Rákospalota	2–3	Zalaegerszeg	Budapest
20:00 CEST (UTC+2)	Nyerges 17' (pen.); Dancs 51'; Erős (yellow card) 60'; Dinka (yellow card) 62'; T. Nagy (yellow card) 66'	Report	Waltner 5' (pen.); Zsömlye (yellow card) 16'; Méyé (yellow card) 21', (goal) 81'; Petneházi (yellow card) 47'; P. Máté I 87'	Stadium: Budai II. László Stadion; Attendance: 700; Referee: Ferenc Bede; Assistant referees: Attila Kelemen, Gyula Fehér; Fourth official: Dr. Ádám Szanyi

16 August 2008 4	Zalaegerszeg	1–1	Kaposvár	Zalaegerszeg
20:00 CEST (UTC+2)	Waltner (yellow card) 51'; Petrók 71' (o.g.); Botiș (yellow card) 76'; Z. Tóth I (yellow card) 83'	Report	Božović 78'	Stadium: ZTE Arena; Attendance: 4,000; Referee: István Mészáros; Assistant referees: László Viszokai, István Iványi; Fourth official: Miklós Tuczai

24 August 2008 5	Honvéd	3–1	Zalaegerszeg	Budapest
20:00 CEST (UTC+2)	Rigonato 22'; Dieng 29', 42'	Report	Miljatovič 7'; Davidov (yellow card) 60'	Stadium: Bozsik József Stadion; Attendance: 1,200; Referee: Zoltán Iványi; Assistant referees: Zsolt Szpisják, János Medovarszki; Fourth official: Tibor Csatári

29 August 2008 6	Zalaegerszeg	3–1	MTK	Zalaegerszeg
19:00 CEST (UTC+2)	Balázs (yellow card) 30', (goal) 48'; Méyé 45', (yellow card) 54'; Hajdú 51'	Report	Radulović (yellow card) 70'; Pál 80'	Stadium: ZTE Arena; Attendance: 3,000; Referee: Péter Solymosi; Assistant referees: Gábor Takács, Balázs Huszár; Fourth official: Miklós Tuczai

13 September 2008 7	Diósgyőr	2–1	Zalaegerszeg	Miskolc
20:00 CEST (UTC+2)	Kamber 12', (yellow card) 54'; Z. Pintér (yellow card) 42'; Honma 64'	Report	Szamosi (yellow card) 15'; Miljatovič 31'; Petneházi (yellow card) 52'; Z. Tóth I (yellow card) 70'; Méyé (yellow card) 82'	Stadium: Diósgyőri Stadion; Attendance: 2,500; Referee: Sándor Andó-Szabó; Assistant referees: György Ring, Balázs Farkas; Fourth official: Gábor Oláh

20 September 2008 8	Zalaegerszeg	1–1	Paks	Zalaegerszeg
19:00 CEST (UTC+2)	Kriston 74' (o.g.)	Report	Tököli 61'	Stadium: ZTE Arena; Attendance: 1,652; Referee: Szabolcs Szilasi; Assistant referees: Oszkár Lémon, Imre Attila Nagy; Fourth official: Balázs Böcskei

27 September 2008 9	Vasas	3–1	Zalaegerszeg	Budapest
19:00 CEST (UTC+2)	Unierzyski 49'; Balog (yellow card) 57'; N. Németh (yellow card) 59', (goal) 74'; Dobrić 72'; Sowunmi (yellow card) 81'	Report	P. Máté I (yellow card) 45'; Szamosi (yellow card) 50'; Méyé 64'; Hajdú (yellow card) 77'	Stadium: Illovszky Rudolf Stadion; Attendance: 5,000; Referee: István Vad; Assistant referees: Vencel Tóth II, György Ring; Fourth official: Gergely Szőts

5 October 2008 10	Győr	1–0	Zalaegerszeg	Győr
17:30 CEST (UTC+2)	Bank (red card) 11'; Bicák 90+2', (yellow card) 90+3'	Report	G. Kovács (yellow card) 62'; Méyé (red card) 82'; Szamosi (yellow card) 86'	Stadium: ETO Park; Attendance: 1,500; Referee: Zsolt Szabó; Assistant referees: Róbert Kispál, Dr. Zsolt Varga; Fourth official: Dr. Ádám Szanyi

18 October 2008 11	Zalaegerszeg	2–0	Fehérvár	Zalaegerszeg
18:00 CEST (UTC+2)	Balázs 21'; Hajdú (yellow card) 27'; Botiș (yellow card) 33'; Waltner 90+1' (pen.)	Report	G. Horváth II (yellow card) 27'; Vujović (red card) 61'; Sitku (yellow card) 89'	Stadium: ZTE Arena; Attendance: 4,000; Referee: Gergely Sulyok; Assistant referees: Dr. Péter Kovács, Imre Attila Nagy; Fourth official: József Erdős

26 October 2008 12	Nyíregyháza	1–1	Zalaegerszeg	Nyíregyháza
18:00 CET (UTC+1)	Cornaci (yellow card) 56'; Stojkov 82'	Report	Davidov (yellow card) 34'; Waltner 53'; P. Máté I (yellow card) 83'; Méyé (yellow card) 90'	Stadium: Városi Stadion; Attendance: 4,000; Referee: Roland Veizer; Assistant referees: Péter Berettyán, Tibor Vígh; Fourth official: Ferenc Szöllősi

31 October 2008 13	Zalaegerszeg	2–2	Újpest	Zalaegerszeg
19:00 CET (UTC+1)	Waltner 24', 71', (yellow card) 26'; Szamosi (yellow card) 63'	Report	Korcsmár 4'; Dudić (yellow card) 21'; Rajczi 43'; Lipták (red card) 66'; Božić (yellow card) 73'	Stadium: ZTE Arena; Attendance: 6,431; Referee: Viktor Kassai; Assistant referees: Gábor Erős, Tibor Vámos; Fourth official: Péter Tamási

9 November 2008 14	Siófok	1–4	Zalaegerszeg	Siófok
15:00 CET (UTC+1)	Sütő 45'; G. Hegedűs (yellow card) 56'; Fülöp (yellow card) 63'	Report	Méyé 24', 71'; An. Horváth I (yellow card) 29'; Hajdú (yellow card) 41'; Waltner 46'; P. Máté I 90+3'	Stadium: Révész Géza utcai Stadion; Attendance: 400; Referee: József Berger; Assistant referees: Attila Forgács, Balázs Farkas; Fourth official: Gergely Szőts

15 November 2008 15	Zalaegerszeg	3–2	Haladás	Zalaegerszeg
18:00 CET (UTC+1)	Méyé 28'; Waltner 32' (pen.); P. Máté I (yellow card) 53'; Z. Tóth I 87', (yellow card) 87'	Report	Schimmer (yellow card) 45'; Oross (yellow card) 53'; Andorka 76'; Rajos 80'	Stadium: ZTE Arena; Attendance: 8,857; Referee: Péter Solymosi; Assistant referees: Oszkár Lémon, István Iványi; Fourth official: Dávid Ákos

7 March 2009 18	Zalaegerszeg	2–1	Rákospalota	Zalaegerszeg
18:00 CET (UTC+1)	An. Horváth I (yellow card) 34'; G. Illés 46'; Waltner 60'	Report	Zo. Kovács (yellow card) 60'; Dancs 73'; Pintér (yellow card) 90'	Stadium: ZTE Arena; Attendance: 2,325; Referee: Péter Solymosi; Assistant referees: Gábor Takács, Zoltán Kovács; Fourth official: Dávid Ákos

16 March 2009 19	Kaposvár	1–2	Zalaegerszeg	Kaposvár
19:00 CET (UTC+1)	Petrók (yellow card) 33'; Miljatovič 57' (o.g.); Pest (yellow card) 67'	Report	Waltner 26', (yellow card) 67'; An. Horváth I (yellow card) 44'; Kocsárdi 48'; Miljatovič (yellow card) 86'	Stadium: Rákóczi Stadion; Attendance: 1,500; Referee: Szabolcs Szilasi; Assistant referees: Gábor Erős, Dr. Péter Kovács; Fourth official: Dániel Becséri

21 March 2009 20	Zalaegerszeg	1–1	Honvéd	Zalaegerszeg
15:00 CET (UTC+1)	R. Varga (yellow card) 56'; Miljatovič (yellow card) 62'; Hajdú 87'	Report	Dieng (yellow card) 45'; Hercegfalvi 76'; Simić (yellow card) 78'	Stadium: ZTE Arena; Attendance: 2,953; Referee: Ferenc Bede; Assistant referees: György Ring, Vencel Tóth II; Fourth official: Krisztián Pánczél

4 April 2009 21	MTK	0–2	Zalaegerszeg	Budapest
19:00 CEST (UTC+2)	J. Kanta (yellow card) 90+1'	Report	Alomerović 50'; Sluka 65'	Stadium: Hidegkuti Nándor Stadion; Attendance: 500; Referee: István Vad; Assistant referees: György Ring, Vencel Tóth II; Fourth official: Gergely Szőts

8 April 2009 16	Zalaegerszeg	2–1	Debrecen	Zalaegerszeg
18:00 CEST (UTC+2)	G. Illés 32'; Waltner (yellow card) 35'; Pavićević 61'; Sluka (yellow card) 90'; Miljatovič (yellow card) 90+3'	Report	J. Varga (yellow card) 23'; Leandro (yellow card) 37'; Omagbemi 39', (yellow card) 90+3'; Bernáth (yellow card) 77'	Stadium: ZTE Arena; Attendance: 6,382; Referee: Zsolt Szabó; Assistant referees: Róbert Kispál, Zoltán Kovács; Fourth official: Krisztián Király

12 April 2009 22	Zalaegerszeg	1–0	Diósgyőr	Zalaegerszeg
17:30 CEST (UTC+2)	Pavićević 65', (yellow card) 66'; Sluka (yellow card) 82'; R. Varga (yellow card) 90+1'	Report	V. Szabó (yellow card) 66'	Stadium: ZTE Arena; Attendance: 5,500; Referee: József Berger; Assistant referees: László Viszokai, Attila Forgács; Fourth official: Dániel Becséri

18 April 2009 23	Paks	1–1	Zalaegerszeg	Paks
19:00 CEST (UTC+2)	Tököli (yellow card) 54', (goal) 65' (pen.)	Report	Hajdú (yellow card) 20'; Balázs 53'; Botiș (yellow card) 65'; P. Máté I (yellow card) 68'; R. Varga (yellow card) 76'	Stadium: Fehérvári úti Stadion; Attendance: 2,000; Referee: Ádám Németh; Assistant referees: Zsolt Butkai, Zsolt Márton; Fourth official: József Erdős

25 April 2009 24	Zalaegerszeg	3–1	Vasas	Zalaegerszeg
19:00 CEST (UTC+2)	Waltner 24' (pen.); Balázs 68', 71'; Kocsárdi (red card) 83'	Report	Paripović (red card) 14'; R. Varga 19' (o.g.); Pavičević (yellow card) 33'; Vujović (yellow card) 60'	Stadium: ZTE Arena; Attendance: 4,182; Referee: Szabolcs Szilasi; Assistant referees: Oszkár Lémon, Gábor Takács; Fourth official: Dávid Ákos

28 April 2009 25	Zalaegerszeg	2–7	Győr	Zalaegerszeg
19:00 CEST (UTC+2)	Alomerović 9'; Waltner 28'; Miljatovič (red card) 56'	Report	Józsi 3', 58'; Völgyi (yellow card) 39'; Bajzát 47', 65', 75'; Bank (yellow card) 55'; Böőr 60'; Aleksidze 79'	Stadium: ZTE Arena; Attendance: 4,096; Referee: Sándor Andó-Szabó; Assistant referees: Vencel Tóth II, Balázs Huszár; Fourth official: Csaba Pintér

1 May 2009 26	Fehérvár	1–1	Zalaegerszeg	Székesfehérvár
19:00 CEST (UTC+2)	D. Szakály 28'; G. Horváth II (yellow card) 44'; Polonkai (yellow card) 84'	Report	An. Horváth I (yellow card) 60'; Sluka 75'	Stadium: Sóstói Stadion; Attendance: 1,795; Referee: Zsolt Szabó; Assistant referees: Róbert Kispál, Zsolt Márton; Fourth official: Gergő Király

6 May 2009 17	Kecskemét	2–0	Zalaegerszeg	Kecskemét
19:00 CEST (UTC+2)	Litsingi 16', 45'; Némedi (yellow card) 63'; I. Farkas (yellow card) 73'; Schindler (yellow card) 85'	Report	Kocsárdi (yellow card) 54'; Waltner (yellow card) 62'	Stadium: Széktói Stadion; Attendance: 2,000; Referee: Viktor Kassai; Assistant referees: Gábor Erős, Tibor Vámos; Fourth official: Gábor Oláh

9 May 2009 27	Zalaegerszeg	2–0	Nyíregyháza	Zalaegerszeg
19:00 CEST (UTC+2)	An. Horváth I (yellow card) 27'; Waltner 43', 54'; Miljatovič (yellow card) 78'	Report	Lakatos (yellow card) 8'; Ramos (yellow card) 53'; Hegedűs (yellow card) 69'; Zabos (yellow card) 75'; D. Oláh (yellow card) 79'; Minczér (yellow card) 81'; Miskolczi (yellow card) 82'	Stadium: ZTE Arena; Attendance: 3,785; Referee: István Vad; Assistant referees: Oszkár Lémon, Zoltán Kovács; Fourth official: Gergő Janitz

15 May 2009 28	Újpest	2–1	Zalaegerszeg	Budapest
19:00 CEST (UTC+2)	Tisza (yellow card) 35'; Lipták 36'; A. Simon I 59'; Božić (yellow card) 67'	Report	Sluka (yellow card) 44'; Szamosi (yellow card) 67'; G. Kovács (yellow card) 84'; Pavićević 86'; An. Horváth II (yellow card) 90+2'	Stadium: Szusza Ferenc Stadion; Attendance: 4,238; Referee: Péter Solymosi; Assistant referees: László Viszokai, Gábor Takács; Fourth official: Gergely Sulyok

23 May 2009 29	Zalaegerszeg	5–3	Siófok	Zalaegerszeg
19:00 CEST (UTC+2)	Rudņevs 10', 44'; G. Kovács 34'; Waltner (yellow card) 58', (goal) 88'; Sluka 61'	Report	G. Horváth I 4', (yellow card) 83'; Magasföldi 37'; Kogler 79'	Stadium: ZTE Arena; Attendance: 3,000; Referee: Zsolt Szabó; Assistant referees: György Ring, Zoltán Szalai; Fourth official: Gergely Szőts

30 May 2009 30	Haladás	1–2	Zalaegerszeg	Szombathely
19:00 CEST (UTC+2)	B. Molnár (yellow card) 18'; P. Tóth I (yellow card) 27'; Oross 71'	Report	Botiș (yellow card) 35'; Pavićević 90'; Balázs 90+2'	Stadium: Rohonci út Attendance: 12,500; Referee: Viktor Kassai; Assistant referees: György Ring, Zsolt Márton; Fourth official: J. Zoltán Kovács

=== Magyar Kupa ===
3 September 2008 Third round	Veszprém	2–1	Zalaegerszeg	Veszprém
15:30 CEST (UTC+2)	Tatai (yellow card) 22'; Garai (yellow card) 55'; Marosvölgyi 60', 82'	Report	Pekič 38'; Zsömlye (yellow card) 70'; Davidov (red card) 88'; Botiș (yellow card) 90'; Kocsárdi (yellow card) 90'; P. Máté I (yellow card) 90'	Stadium: Városi Stadion; Attendance: 300; Referee: Gábor Péter Kovács; Assistant referees: József Rózsa, Mihály Riesinger

=== Ligakupa ===
==== Group stage ====
Pos	Team	Pld	W	D	L	GF	GA	GD	Pts	Qualification	UJP	PEC	KAP	ZAL	PAK	DUN
1	Újpest	10	6	2	2	25	15	+10	20	Advance to knockout phase	—	4–0	2–4	2–1	0–0	5–1
2	Pécs	10	6	2	2	24	14	+10	20	Advance to knockout phase	1–1	—	2–4	2–0	3–1	3–1
3	Kaposvár	10	6	1	3	26	20	+6	19		2–4	1–4	—	1–0	2–1	2–2
4	Zalaegerszeg	10	4	1	5	15	15	0	13		2–3	0–0	0–5	—	3–1	5–0
5	Paks	10	3	2	5	17	14	+3	11		3–1	0–1	4–0	0–2	—	2–2
6	Dunaújváros	10	0	2	8	11	40	−29	2		1–3	2–8	1–5	1–2	0–5	—

Source: HFF

1 October 2008 1	Zalaegerszeg	5–0	Dunaújváros	Zalaegerszeg
18:00 CEST (UTC+2)	Trnavac 7', 72', (yellow card) 34'; Pekič 30'; Z. Tóth I (yellow card) 31'; Alomerović 61'; T. Balogh 90'	Report	A. Nagy (yellow card) 12'	Stadium: ZTE Arena; Attendance: 300; Referee: Balázs Böcskei; Assistant referees: Dr. Péter Kovács, Roland Schuszter

15 October 2008 2	Pécs	2–0	Zalaegerszeg	Pécs
17:00 CEST (UTC+2)	Wittrédi 21' (pen.); Z. Horváth 24'; Luczek (yellow card) 41'	Report	P. Máté I (yellow card) 73'	Stadium: Stadion PMFC; Attendance: 400; Referee: Csaba Pintér; Assistant referees: Balázs Huszár, Zoltán Kovács

29 October 2008 3	Kaposvár	1–0	Zalaegerszeg	Kaposvár
14:00 CET (UTC+1)	Kerekes 66'	Report		Stadium: Rákóczi Stadion; Attendance: 100; Referee: József Erdős; Assistant referees: Róbert Kispál, Ferenc Varga

5 November 2008 4	Zalaegerszeg	3–1	Paks	Zalaegerszeg
14:00 CET (UTC+1)	Alomerović 27', 44'; T. Balogh (yellow card) 62'; An. Horváth I 83'	Report	Pákai 84'	Stadium: ZTE Arena; Attendance: 400; Referee: Tamás Arany; Assistant referees: Dr. Péter Kovács, Roland Schuszter

12 November 2008 5	Újpest	2–1	Zalaegerszeg	Budapest
19:00 CET (UTC+1)	Üveges (yellow card) 44'; Szekér 51'; Remili 72'	Report	Pekič 86'	Stadium: Szusza Ferenc Stadion; Attendance: 300; Referee: Ádám Németh; Assistant referees: Zoltán Szalai, Gábor Varga Jr.

22 November 2008 6	Dunaújváros	1–2	Zalaegerszeg	Dunaújváros
13:00 CET (UTC+1)	Frőhlich 60'	Report	Zsömlye (yellow card) 32'; Pekič 45'; Sluka 80'	Stadium: Dunaújvárosi Stadion; Attendance: 100; Referee: Viktor Kassai; Assistant referees: Gábor Erős, Zsolt Szpisják

26 November 2008 8	Zalaegerszeg	0–5	Kaposvár	Zalaegerszeg
13:00 CET (UTC+1)		Report	Nikolić 6'; Božović 35', 53'; L. Balogh 64'; Kerekes 81'	Stadium: ZTE Arena; Attendance: 200; Referee: Dávid Ákos; Assistant referees: Oszkár Lémon, Gábor Takács

29 November 2008 7	Zalaegerszeg	0–0	Pécs	Zalaegerszeg
14:00 CET (UTC+1)		Report		Stadium: ZTE Arena; Attendance: 100; Referee: Csaba Pintér; Assistant referees: Zoltán Kovács, Balázs Huszár

11 February 2009 9	Paks	0–2	Zalaegerszeg	Székesfehérvár (Note: The match was played at the Sóstói Stadion in Székesfehérvár, instead of Paks regular stadium, the Fehérvári úti Stadion in Paks, due to poor pitch conditions caused by unfavorable weather.)
13:00 CET (UTC+1)		Report	Alomerović 31'; Pavićević 75'	Stadium: Sóstói Stadion; Attendance: 50; Referee: Szabolcs Szilasi; Assistant referees: László Viszokai, István Iványi

14 February 2009 10	Zalaegerszeg	2–3	Újpest	Zalaegerszeg
15:00 CET (UTC+1)	Kocsárdi (yellow card) 34'; Pavićević (yellow card) 45'; Balázs 59'; Botiș (yellow card) 63'; Waltner 90+3'	Report	Kabát 10', 68'; Božić (yellow card) 80'; Kéthévoama 90'	Stadium: ZTE Arena; Attendance: 300; Referee: Zsolt Szabó; Assistant referees: Róbert Kispál, Vencel Tóth II

== Statistics ==
=== Overall ===
Appearances (Apps) numbers are for appearances in competitive games only, including sub appearances.
Source: Competitions

No.	Player	Pos.	Nemzeti Bajnokság I				Magyar Kupa				Ligakupa				Total			
No.	Player	Pos.	Apps	Goal	Yellow card	Red card	Apps	Goal	Yellow card	Red card	Apps	Goal	Yellow card	Red card	Apps	Goal	Yellow card	Red card
1	(Hungary) Géza Vlaszák	GK	26								1				27			
2	(Hungary) Gergely Kocsárdi	DF	24	1	1	1	1		1		3		1		28	1	3	1
3	(Hungary) Dániel Borsos	DF									1				1			
3	(Hungary) Róbert Varga	DF	11		3						9				20		3	
4	(Hungary) Tamás Szamosi	DF	28		5		1				3				32		5	
5	(Hungary) Tamás Balogh	DF									4	1	1		4	1	1	
5	(Montenegro) Darko Pavićević	FW	11	4	1		1				2	1	1		14	5	2	
5	(Serbia) Aleksandar Trninić	DF									1				1			
6	(Romania) Sorin Botiș	DF	27		4		1		1		3		1		31		6	
7	(Hungary) Gyula Illés	MF	14	2											14	2		
7	(Hungary) Gábor Sági	MF									2				2			
7	(Serbia) Milutin Trnavac	MF	5		1						6	2	1		11	2	2	
8	(Hungary) Zoltán Tóth	MF	11	1	3		1				6		1		18	1	4	
9	(Hungary) Róbert Waltner	FW	25	15	7						3	1			28	16	7	
10	(Hungary) Norbert Hajdú	MF	25	2	4						4				29	2	4	
11	(Slovenia) Damir Pekič	FW	5				1	1			5	3			11	4		
11	(Latvia) Artjoms Rudņevs	FW	4	2											4	2		
12	(Hungary) Krisztián Pogacsics	GK	4				1				3				8			
13	(Serbia) Milan Davidov	FW	11		2		1			1	3				15		2	1
14	(North Macedonia) Kemal Alomerović	MF	21	2							5	4			26	6		
15	(Hungary) Milán Hegedüs	MF																
15	(Hungary) Márk Petneházi	MF	15		2						8				23		2	
16	(Hungary) Péter Máté	MF	24	2	4		1		1		4		1		29	2	6	
17	(Hungary) Zsolt Balázs	FW	23	6	1		1				6	1			30	7	1	
17	(Hungary) László Miszori	MF																
18	(Hungary) Gergő Kovács	DF	10	1	2						9				19	1	2	
19	(Hungary) Tihamér Lukács	MF	1								2				3			
19	(Croatia) Igor Mirčeta	MF									5				5			
20	(Slovakia) Marián Sluka	MF	22	3	3	1	1				8	1			31	4	3	1
21	(Gabon) Roguy Méyé	FW	14	7	4	1									14	7	4	1
21	(Hungary) Ferenc Szommer	GK																
22	(Slovenia) Matej Miljatovič	DF	26	2	4	1	1				4				31	2	4	1
23	(Hungary) Gábor Sipos	GK									7				7			
24	(Hungary) Gergely Délczeg	FW	2								4				6			
24	(Hungary) Ádám Hamar	FW									2				2			
25	(Hungary) Csaba Ferkó	MF									2				2			
26	(Hungary) György Zsömlye	MF	6		2		1		1		5		1		12		4	
27	(Hungary) István Rácz	DF									5				5			
28	(Hungary) Krisztián Kottán	MF	1				1				3				5			
29	(Hungary) András Horváth I	MF	17		5						6	1			23	1	5	
30	(Hungary) András Horváth II	MF	4		1						2				6		1	
31	(Hungary) Imre Bozsoki	DF									1				1			
31	(Hungary) Tibor Fülöp	FW									2				2			
31	(Hungary) Zoltán Kenderes	MF									2				2			
31	(Hungary) Adrián Kocsis	DF									1				1			
Own goals				2												2		
Totals				52	59	4		1	4	1		15	8			68	71	5

=== Clean sheets ===
			Clean sheets			
No.	Player	Games Played	Nemzeti Bajnokság I	Magyar Kupa	Ligakupa	Total
1	(Hungary) Géza Vlaszák	27	5			5
12	(Hungary) Krisztián Pogacsics	8			1	1
23	(Hungary) Gábor Sipos	7			3	3
21	(Hungary) Ferenc Szommer					
Totals			5		4	9
