= Ivan Delić =

Ivan Delić can refer to:

- Ivan Delić (Croatian footballer) (born 1998), currently playing for NK Varaždin
- Ivan Delić (Montenegrin footballer) (born 1986), former footballer
