= Ádám Vittman =

Hungarian footballer

Personal information
- Full name: Ádám Vittman
- Date of birth: 23 November 1991 (age 34)
- Place of birth: Nagykanizsa, Hungary
- Height: 1.85 m (6 ft 1 in)
- Position: Striker

Team information
- Current team: Zalaegerszeg
- Number: 11

Youth career
- 2002–2003: Becsehely
- 2003–2006: Nagykanizsa FC
- 2006–2011: Zalaegerszeg

Senior career*
| Years | Team | Apps | (Gls) |
| 2011– | Zalaegerszegi TE | 9 | (0) |
| 2011–2012 | → Ajka (loan) | 10 | (1) |
| 2012–2014 | → Andráshida (loan) | 40 | (25) |
- * Club domestic league appearances and goals as of 1 March 2014

Ádám Vittman (born 23 November 1991) is a Hungarian striker who currently plays for Zalaegerszegi TE.
