= Ahmet Delić =

Serbian-Austrian footballer

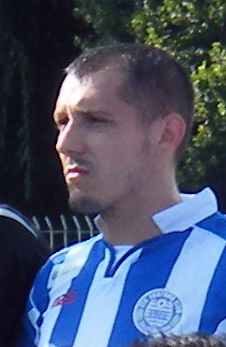

Personal information
- Date of birth: 17 February 1986 (age 40)
- Place of birth: Priboj, SFR Yugoslavia
- Height: 1.81 m (5 ft 11 in)
- Position: Midfielder

Youth career
- 2000–2003: FAP Priboj

Senior career*
Years	Team	Apps	(Gls)
2003–2006	Admira Wacker II	44	(5)
2006–2007	Admira Wacker	13	(2)
2007–2008	Rot-Weiß Oberhausen	2	(0)
2008–2009	St. Pölten	10	(0)
2009–2010	Parndorf 1919	19	(7)
2010	Ostbahn XI	15	(6)
2010–2012	Zalaegerszeg	32	(3)
2012	Soproni VSE	3	(1)
2012–2013	Simmering	17	(3)
2013	SV Wimpassing	11	(8)
2014–2015	SC Trausdorf	38	(25)
2016	Margaretner AC	10	(0)
2018-2021	SC Maria Lanzendorf	0	(0)
2021-2023	USV Weiten	4	(0)
- * Club domestic league appearances and goals

Ahmet Delić (born 17 February 1986 in Priboj) is a Serbian-Austrian retired football player.
