= Prince Rajcomar =

Curaçaoan footballer (born 1985)

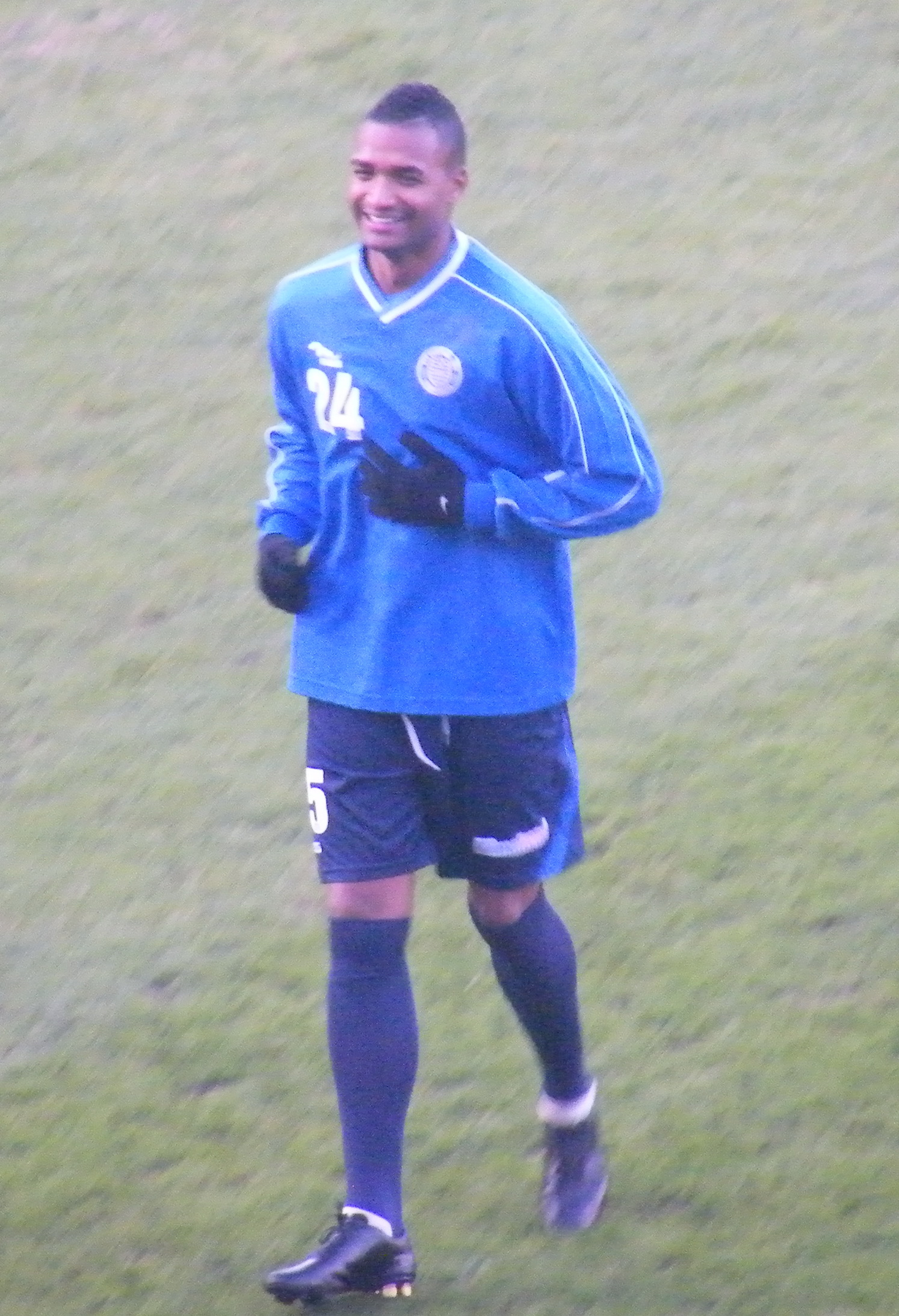

Personal information
- Full name: Prince Linval Reuben Rajcomar
- Date of birth: 25 April 1985 (age 41)
- Place of birth: Maastricht, Netherlands
- Height: 1.87 m (6 ft 2 in)
- Position: Forward

Team information
- Current team: K. Neeroeteren FC
- Number: 7

Senior career*
Years	Team	Apps	(Gls)
2002–2004	Fortuna Sittard	50	(8)
2004–2005	Utrecht	26	(6)
2005–2006	Den Bosch	37	(18)
2006–2009	Breiðablik	34	(25)
2009	KR Reykjavík	15	(7)
2009–2012	Zalaegerszeg	37	(19)
2011–2012	→ MVV Maastricht (loan)	33	(22)
2012–2013	Fortuna Sittard	30	(11)
2013–2014	VVV-Venlo	33	(14)
2015	BEC Tero Sasana	10	(6)
2015–2016	MVV Maastricht	9	(4)
2016	Poli Timișoara	5	(0)
2017	Oosterzonen	11	(7)
2018–2020	Patro Eisden		(7)
2020	Kozakken Boys	4	(0)
2022–	Wilhelmina '08		

International career
1999–2006	Netherlands 14-21	16	(16)
2014–2015	Curaçao	9	(6)
- * Club domestic league appearances and goals as of 15:17, 6 November 2020 (UTC)

Prince Linval Reuben Mathilda Rajcomar (born 25 April 1985) is a Curaçaoan professional footballer who plays as a forward for Tweede Klasse club Wilhelmina '08. At international level, he represented the Curaçao national team, scoring three goals in nine appearances.

== Club career ==
=== Early career ===
Prince made his debut for Fortuna Sittard against FC Eindhoven on 16 August 2002. He then went on to play for FC Utrecht and Den Bosch.

=== Years in Iceland ===
On 27 February 2007, Rajcomar signed a one-year contract with Icelandic club Breiðablik. At the end of the 2007 season he signed a two-year contract extension with Breidablik. Valur, then champions of Iceland, made an approach to sign Rajcomar during the 2008 transfer window, but Breiðablik declined, saying he was not for sale.

Rajcomar lost his place in the Breiðablik side in the second half of the 2008 season, and has been linked with a move away from the club.

In October 2008, he joined Swedish club Örebro SK for a trial, hoping to secure a transfer.

Rajcomar was released by Breiðablik on 2 February 2009, and signed for Icelandic club KR Reykjavík on 5 February. He signed a two-year contract with KR Reykjavík. Rajcomar was released from his contract with KR before the closing of the transfer window in August 2009.

He was due to go on trial with English League One side Southend United having been recommended to the Essex side, however he missed his flight from Germany to the UK after turning up at the wrong airport and missed out on the opportunity.

=== Later career ===
On 7 September 2009, Rajcomar signed a contract with Hungarian outfit Zalaegerszegi TE after missing the opportunity to play in England for Southend United. In his first match for Zalaegerszeg, he caused a sensation by scoring a goal, and being booked with a red card.

He later played for a number of clubs outside the Netherlands, including Patro Eisden Maasmechelen.

In August 2020, Rajcomar returned to the Netherlands, signing with Tweede Divisie club Kozakken Boys. In 2022, he moved to lower division club Wilhelmina '08.

== International career ==
Prince was part of the Netherlands squad for the 2005 FIFA World Youth Championship.

In September 2014, Rajcomar was called up for the first time to the senior Curaçaoan national team, to take part at the Caribbean Cup qualification campaign. He scored his first goal on 3 September 2014 against Puerto Rico.

== Career statistics ==
Scores and results list Curaçao's goal tally first, score column indicates score after each Rajcomar goal.

List of international goals scored by Prince Rajcomar
No.	Date	Venue	Opponent	Score	Result	Competition
1	3 September 2014	Juan Ramón Loubriel Stadium, Bayamón, Puerto Rico	Puerto Rico	1–2	2–2	2014 Caribbean Cup qualification
2	5 September 2014	Juan Ramón Loubriel Stadium, Bayamón, Puerto Rico	Grenada	1–1	2–1	2014 Caribbean Cup qualification
3	13 November 2014	Montego Bay Sports Complex, Montego Bay, Jamaica	Cuba	1–1	2–3	2014 Caribbean Cup

== Honours ==
Utrecht

- Johan Cruyff Shield: 2004
