= Gábor Simonfalvi =

Hungarian footballer

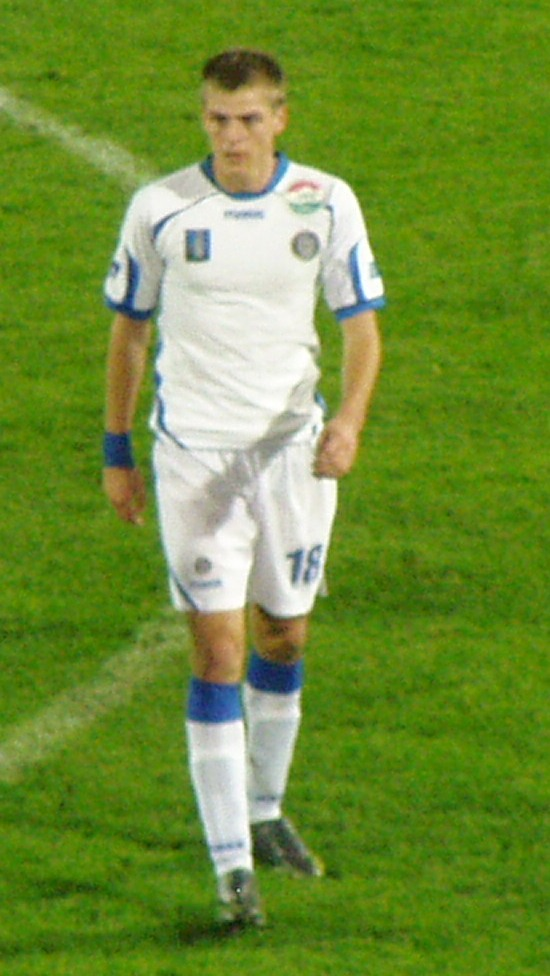

Personal information
- Full name: Gábor Simonfalvi
- Date of birth: 20 July 1987 (age 39)
- Place of birth: Dombóvár, Hungary
- Height: 1.80 m (5 ft 11 in)
- Position: Midfielder

Team information
- Current team: Zalaegerszeg
- Number: 13

Youth career
- 2002–2003: Zalaegerszeg

Senior career*
Years	Team	Apps	(Gls)
2003–2008	Zalaegerszeg	23	(1)
2011–2012	Pécs	78	(3)
2011	→ Zalaegerszeg (loan)	12	(0)
2012–	Zalaegerszeg	72	(8)
- * Club domestic league appearances and goals as of 20 August 2015

Gábor Simonfalvi (born 20 July 1987) is a Hungarian football player who plays for Zalaegerszegi TE.
