= Ivan Delić (Montenegrin footballer) =

Montenegrin footballer

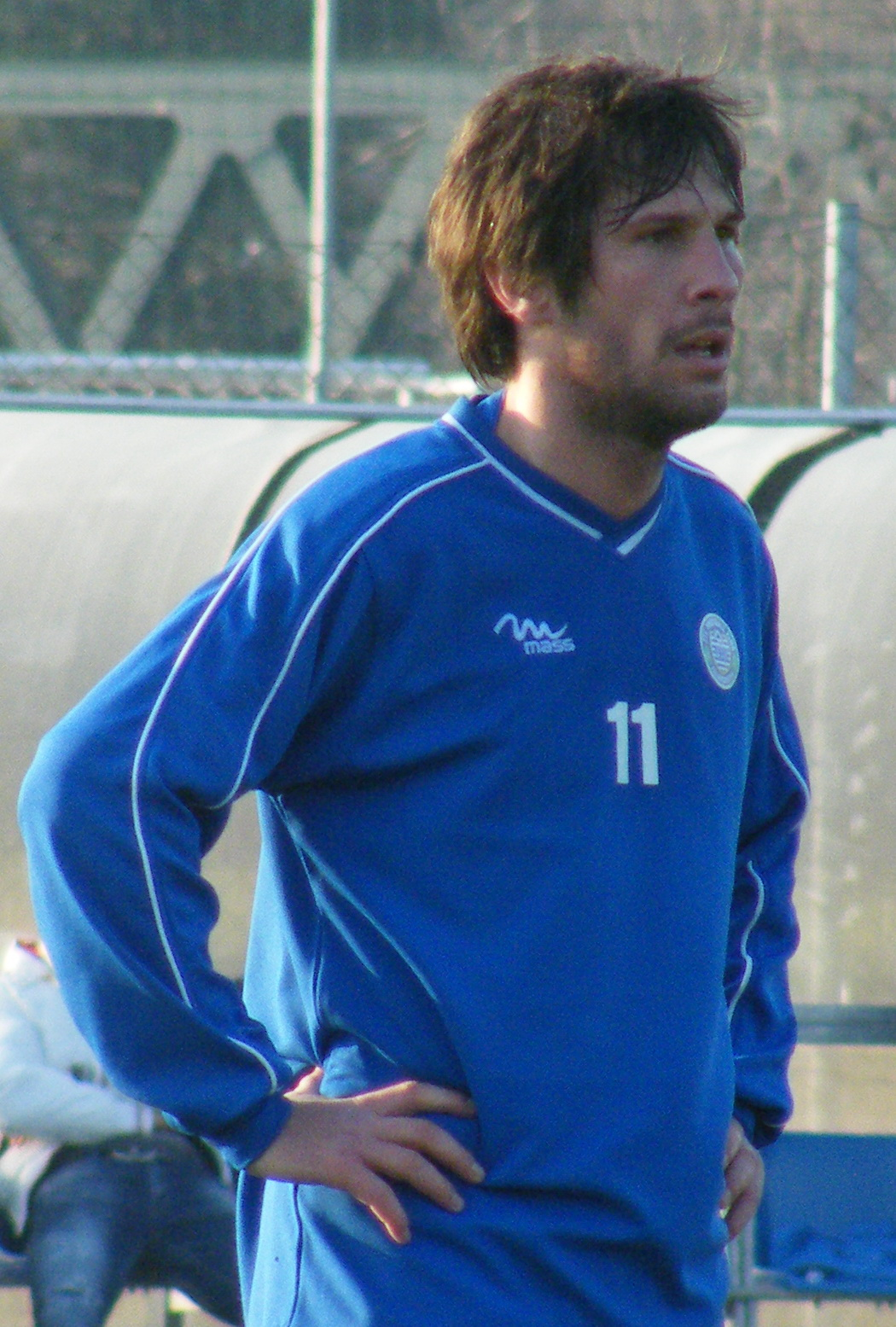

Personal information
- Full name: Ivan Delić
- Date of birth: 15 February 1986 (age 40)
- Place of birth: Titograd, SFR Yugoslavia
- Height: 1.81 m (5 ft 11 in)
- Position: Midfielder

Youth career
- Budućnost Podgorica

Senior career*
Years	Team	Apps	(Gls)
2004–2005	Mladost Podgorica	14	(0)
2005–2010	Budućnost Podgorica	109	(16)
2010	Mladá Boleslav	0	(0)
2011–2012	Zalaegerszeg	14	(1)
2012–2013	Vllaznia Shkodër	18	(2)
2013	Grbalj	15	(7)
2014	Tirana	13	(0)
2014	Lovćen	12	(0)
2015	Mogren	11	(2)
2015–2016	Mladost Velika Obarska	29	(15)
2016–2017	Borac Banja Luka	33	(12)
2018	Sloga GC	13	(2)
2019	Budućnost Podgorica	6	(0)
Total		287	(57)

International career
2006–2007	Montenegro U21	6	(1)
2008–2010	Montenegro	2	(0)
- * Club domestic league appearances and goals

Ivan Delić (Cyrillic: Иван Делић; born 15 February 1986) is a Montenegrin footballer who most recently played for FK Budućnost Podgorica.

== International career ==
Delić made his senior debut for Montenegro in a November 2008 friendly match against Macedonia and has earned a total of 2 caps, scoring no goals. His second and final international was another friendly against the same opposition in March 2010.
