= Leon Panikvar =

Slovenian footballer

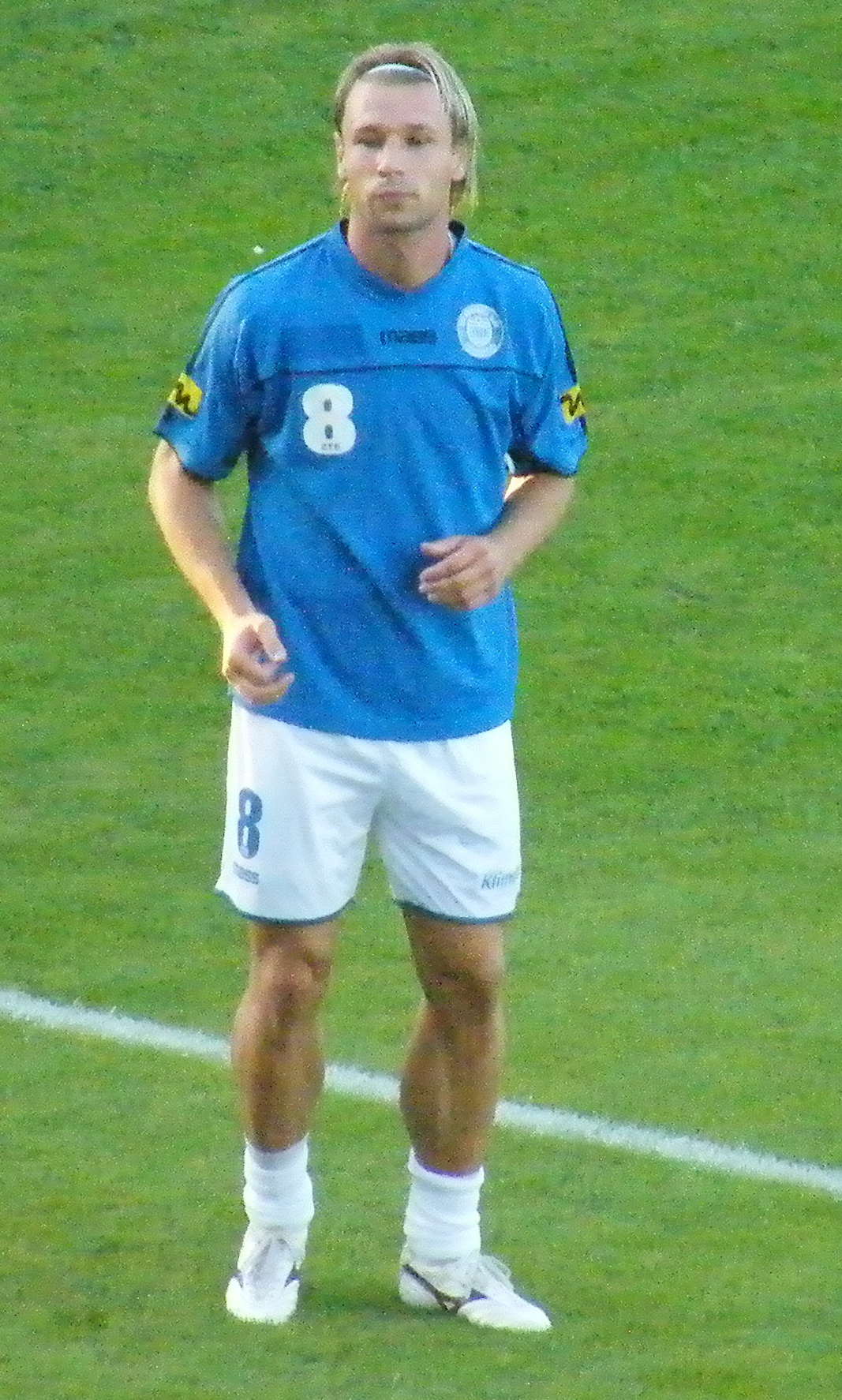

Personal information
- Full name: Leon Panikvar
- Date of birth: 28 January 1983 (age 43)
- Place of birth: Maribor, SFR Yugoslavia
- Height: 1.84 m (6 ft 1/2 in)
- Position: Left midfielder

Team information
- Current team: TuS St. Veit am Vogau
- Number: 42

Youth career
- Gerečja vas
- Aluminij

Senior career*
| Years | Team | Apps | (Gls) |
| 2000–2004 | Aluminij | 75 | (12) |
| 2005–2007 | Maribor | 43 | (2) |
| 2007 | → Bela Krajina (loan) | 14 | (1) |
| 2008-2009 | Primorje | 39 | (0) |
| 2009–2011 | Zalaegerszeg | 43 | (1) |
| 2009–2011 | → Zalaegerszeg II | 9 | (0) |
| 2011–2012 | Kilmarnock | 2 | (0) |
| 2012 | Zalaegerszeg | 4 | (0) |
| 2012 | Pécs | 5 | (0) |
| 2013–2014 | Aluminij | 18 | (4) |
| 2014–2015 | Drava Ptuj | 8 | (1) |
| 2015 | FC Gamlitz | 9 | (1) |
| 2016 | TUS Paldau | 12 | (2) |
| 2016–2017 | UFC Fehring | 36 | (7) |
| 2018 | ASV St. Martin/Raab | 13 | (9) |
| 2018–2020 | SU Tillmitsch | 31 | (7) |
| 2023– | TuS St. Veit/Vogau | 4 | (0) |

International career
| 2001 | Slovenia U19 | 1 | (0) |
| 2002 | Slovenia U20 | 1 | (0) |
- * Club domestic league appearances and goals as of 30 December 2023

Leon Panikvar (born 28 January 1983) is a Slovenian footballer who plays for and is assistant manager at St. Veit am Vogau in Austria.

== Career ==
On 14 July 2009, after a successful trial, Panikvar signed for the Hungarian outfit ZTE on a two-year contract with a one-year option. He made his league debut on 25 July 2009 in a 2–1 away win against Paksi SE.

In summer 2011, Panikvar left ZTE after the one-year option was not taken up. He was then invited for a trial with Kilmarnock where he signed a two-year contract on 17 August 2011. Panikvar made his first appearance for Kilmarnock on 17 September 2011 in a 2–2 away draw to Aberdeen.

After failing to hold down a regular first-team place, he was released by Kilmarnock in January 2012.
