= Gergő Kovács =

Hungarian footballer

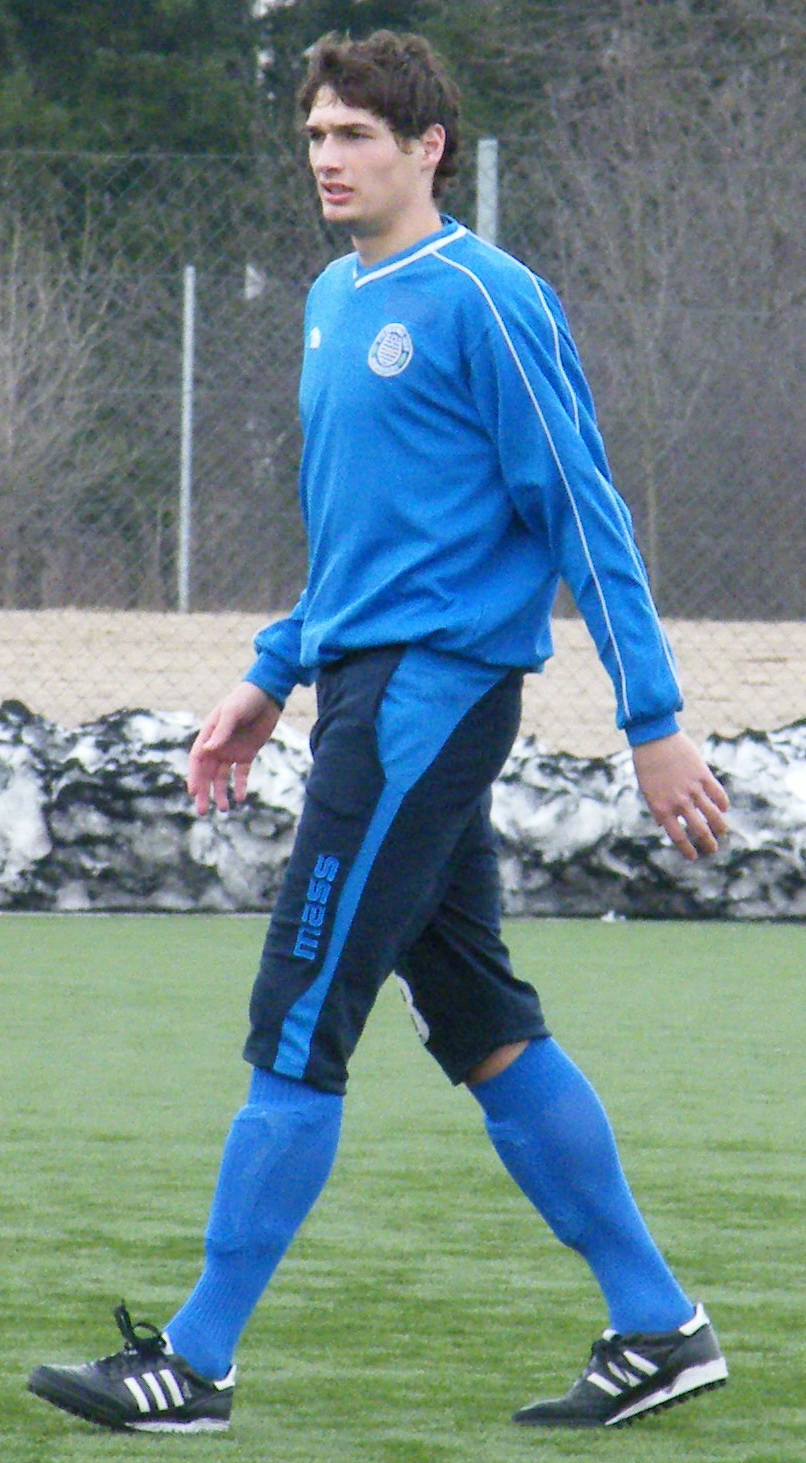

Personal information
- Full name: Gergő Kovács
- Date of birth: 30 October 1989 (age 37)
- Place of birth: Ajka, Hungary
- Height: 1.89 m (6 ft 2 in)
- Position: Centre back

Youth career
- 2000–2004: Ajka
- 2004–2008: Zalaegerszeg

Senior career*
Years	Team	Apps	(Gls)
2007–2015	Zalaegerszeg	119	(4)
2015–2016	Ajka	15	(0)
2016–2017	Soproni	19	(1)
2017–2019	Ajka	66	(7)
- * Club domestic league appearances and goals as of 17:48, 16 March 2021 (UTC)

Gergő Kovács (born 30 October 1989) is a Hungarian footballer, who plays as a centre back.
