= Attila Simon (footballer, born 1983) =

Hungarian footballer

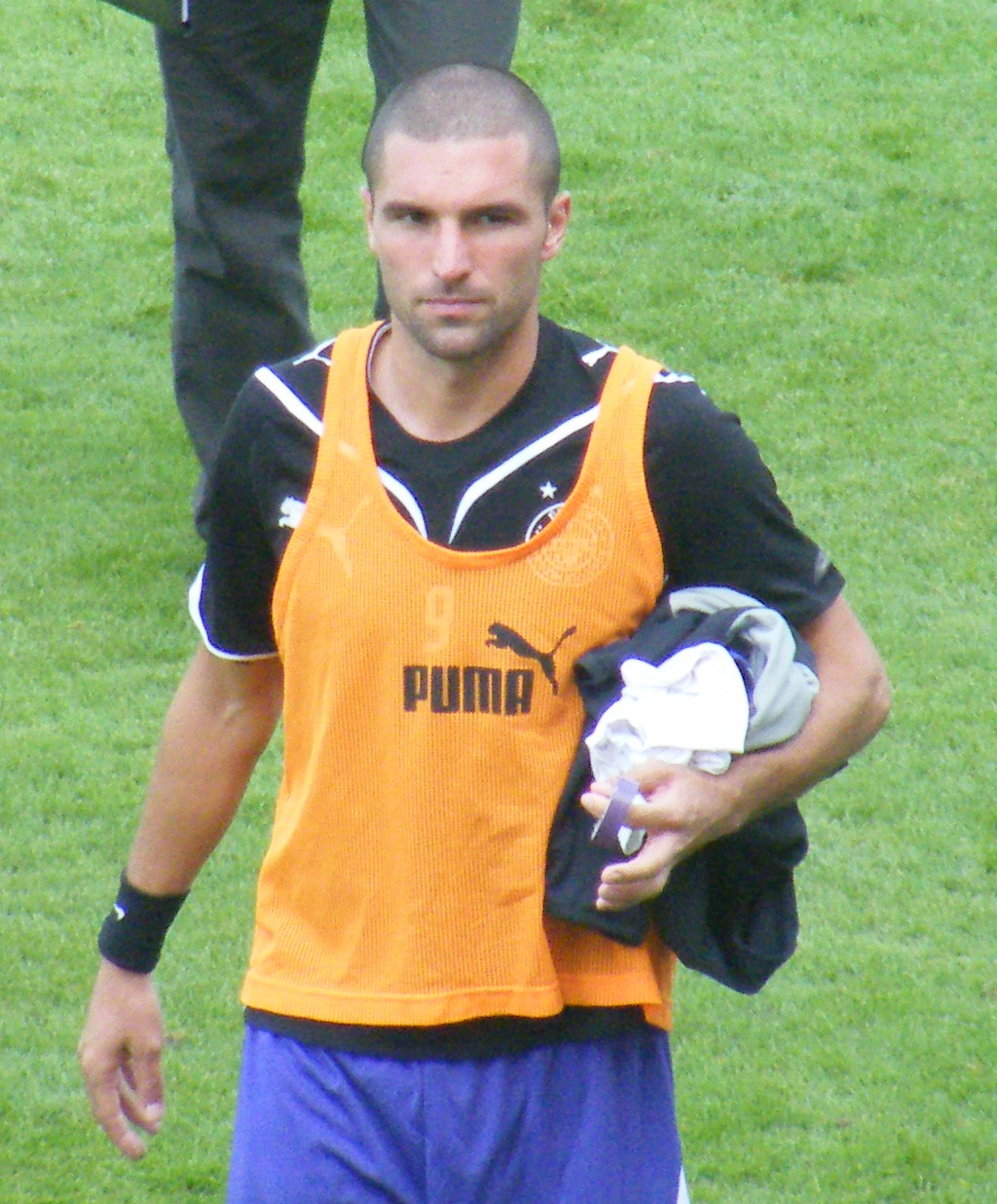
- Simon in 2009

Personal information
- Date of birth: 4 February 1983 (age 43)
- Place of birth: Budapest, Hungary
- Height: 1.88 m (6 ft 2 in)
- Position: Forward

Team information
- Current team: Eger

Youth career
- 1997–2003: MTK Budapest

Senior career*
Years	Team	Apps	(Gls)
2003–2005	BKV Előre	51	(9)
2005–2006	Soroksár	26	(11)
2006–2008	Diósgyőr	57	(22)
2008–2010	Újpest	31	(5)
2010–2012	Kecskemét	21	(4)
2010–2011	→ Zalaegerszeg (loan)	21	(5)
2012	Siófok	13	(7)
2012–2014	Paks	44	(25)
2013	→ Pécs (loan)	13	(3)
2014–2015	Wolfsberger AC	8	(0)
2015	Wolfsberger AC II	9	(3)
2015–2017	Gyirmót	33	(10)
2017–2019	Dorogi	47	(12)
2019–2020	Szolnok	47	(29)
2020–2021	Taksony SE	21	(13)
2021–2022	Dunaharaszti		
2022–	Eger	25	(15)
- * Club domestic league appearances and goals as of 19 March 2023

Attila Simon (born 4 February 1983) is a Hungarian professional footballer who plays as a forward for Eger.

== Career ==
Simon joined Újpest FC from Diósgyőri VTK in May 2008.

He became top scorer in the 2013–14 season of the Hungarian League alongside Videoton striker Nemanja Nikolić with 18 goals each.

He moved to Dorogi of the Nemzeti Bajnokság II in January 2017.
