= Milan Bogunović =

Serbian footballer

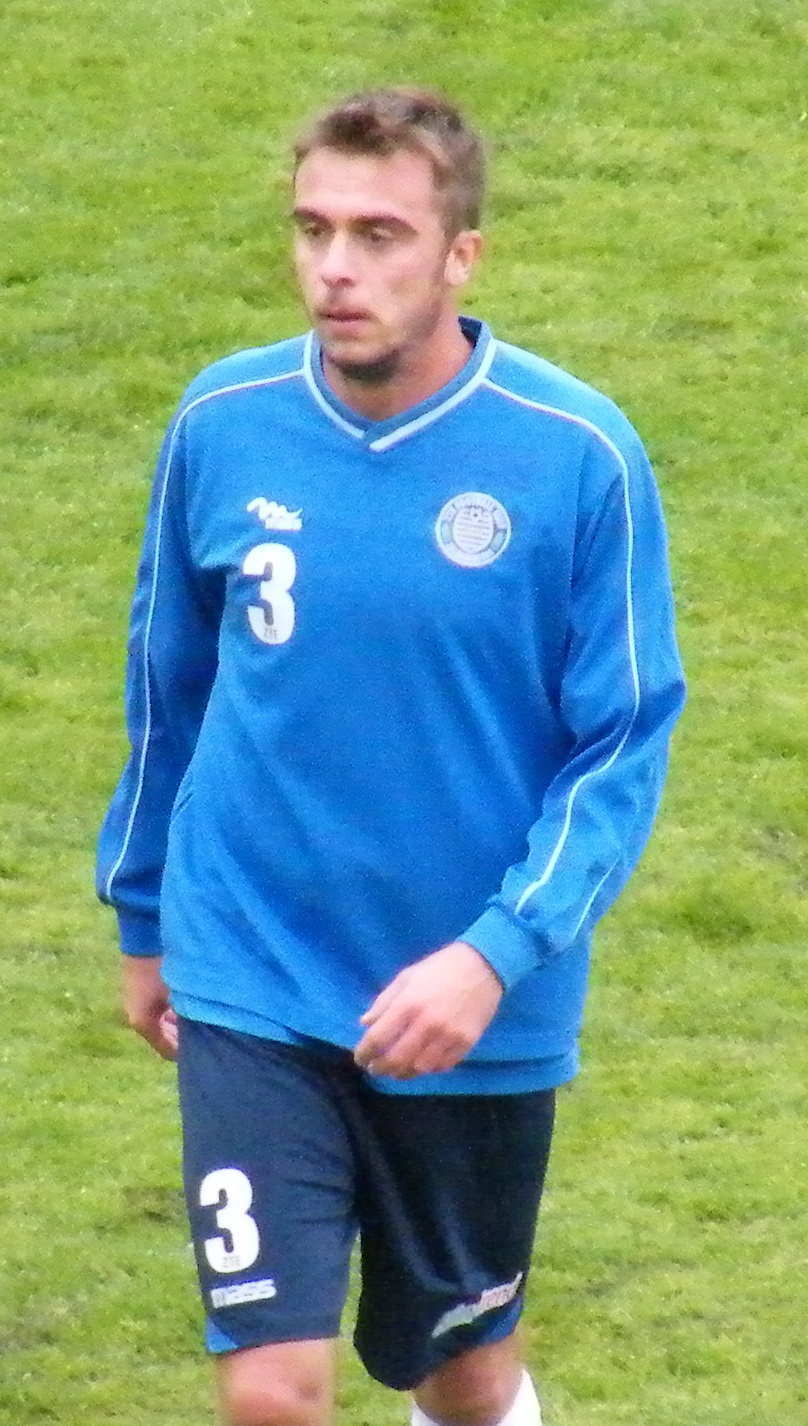

Personal information
- Full name: Milan Bogunović
- Date of birth: 31 May 1983 (age 43)
- Place of birth: Sombor, SR Serbia, SFR Yugoslavia
- Height: 1.89 m (6 ft 2 1/2 in)
- Position: Centre back

Senior career*
Years	Team	Apps	(Gls)
2003–2005	Red Star Belgrade	1	(0)
2004–2005	→ Jedinstvo Ub (loan)		
2005–2006	Budućnost	0	(0)
2006	Radnički Niš		
2006-2007	Zemun	21	(5)
2007–2008	Nejmeh	28	(2)
2008–2009	Voždovac	13	(1)
2009	Diósgyőr	8	(0)
2009–2014	Zalaegerszeg	98	(7)
2014–2015	Pápa	27	(0)
2015–2020	Radnički Sombor		
2020	Feniks 1995		
- * Club domestic league appearances and goals as of 20:50, 1 April 2021 (UTC)

Milan Bogunović (Serbian Cyrillic: Милан Бoгунoвић; born 31 May 1983) is a Serbian retired footballer who played as a defender.

Before signing with ZTE, he had previously played with Serbian clubs Red Star Belgrade, FK Jedinstvo Ub, FK Radnički Niš, FK Zemun and FK Voždovac, but also in Lebanon with Al-Nejmeh SC and another Hungarian club Diósgyőri VTK.
