= András Horváth (footballer, born 1980) =

Hungarian footballer

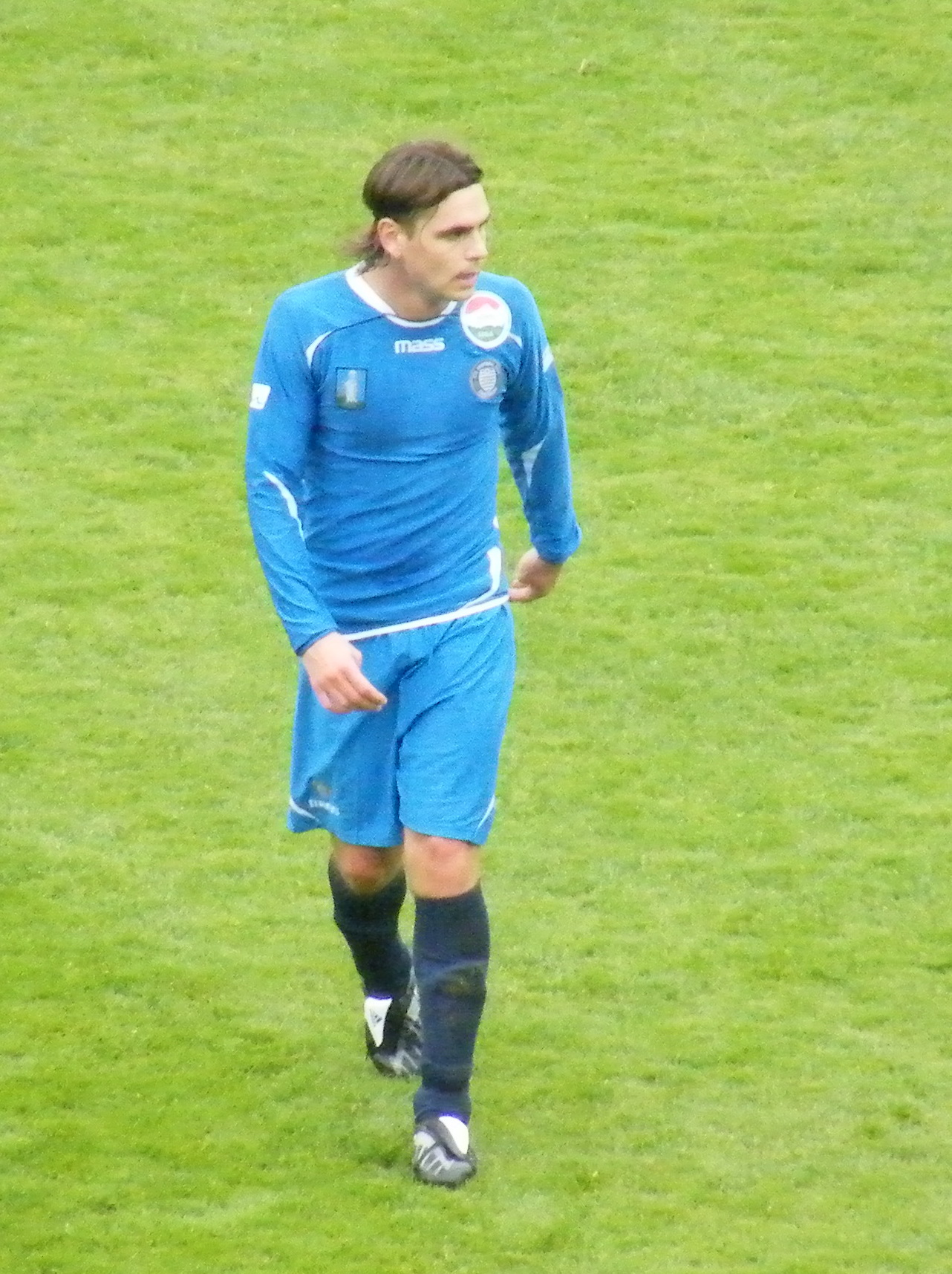

Personal information
- Date of birth: 6 August 1980 (age 46)
- Place of birth: Szombathely, Hungary
- Height: 1.81 m (5 ft 11 in)
- Position: Midfielder

Senior career*
Years	Team	Apps	(Gls)
1995–2002	Haladás	98	(8)
2002–2007	FC Sopron	92	(18)
2007	Gallipoli	12	(2)
2007–2011	Zalaegerszeg	75	(3)
2011–2012	Haladás	12	(0)
2012–2015	Soproni VSE	62	(8)

International career
1996–1997	Hungary U-16	19	(3)
1998–1999	Hungary U-18	2	(0)
1999–2000	Hungary U-21	2	(0)
2006	Hungary	2	(1)
- * Club domestic league appearances and goals

András Horváth (born 6 August 1980) is a former Hungarian professional footballer who played as a midfielder.

== Career ==
Born in Szombathely, Horváth started his career in 1995 with local side Szombathelyi Haladás VSE, before joining FC Sopron in 2002. In 2006, he marked his debut with the Hungary national team, and scored his first international goal in a friendly match against Austria on 16 August 2007. In August 2007 he was signed by Italian third-tier side Gallipoli on advice by Dario Bonetti, who coached him during his stay at FC Sopron. Eventually, he played for Zalaegerszeg, Haladás and Soproni VSE in Hungary.

== Honours ==
FC Sopron

- Hungarian Cup: 2005

== International goals ==
#	Date	Venue	Opponent	Score	Result	Competition
1.	16 August 2006	Graz, Austria	Austria	2–1	Win	Friendly
