= Róbert Varga (footballer) =

Hungarian footballer

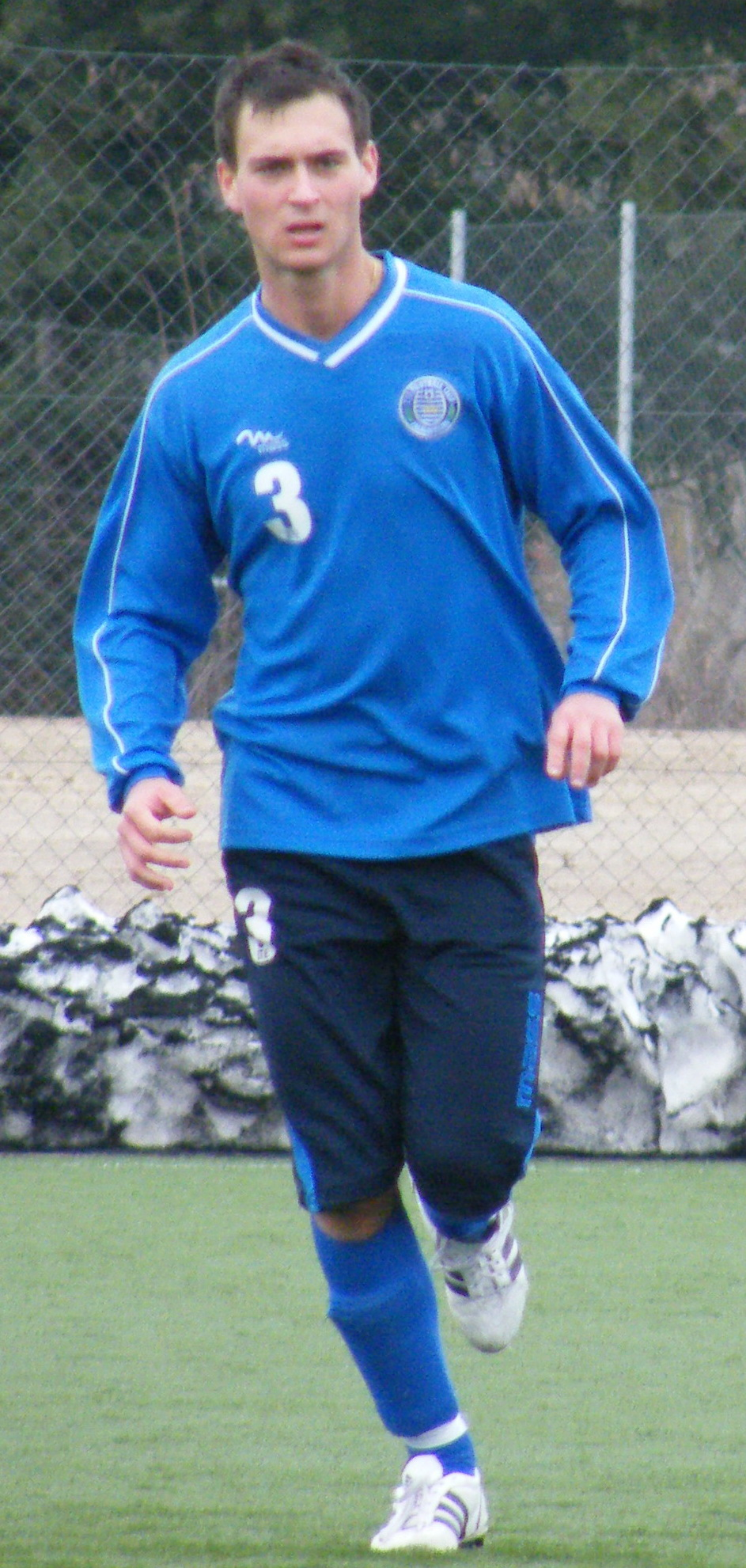

Personal information
- Full name: Róbert Varga
- Date of birth: 25 November 1986 (age 39)
- Place of birth: Győr, Hungary
- Height: 1.86 m (6 ft 1 in)
- Position: Defender

Team information
- Current team: Kecskemét
- Number: 4

Senior career*
Years	Team	Apps	(Gls)
2005–2008	Győr	32	(1)
2008–2009	→ Zalaegerszeg (loan)	11	(0)
2009–2010	Videoton	6	(0)
2010–2012	Zalaegerszeg	21	(2)
2012	Kecskemét	12	(0)
2012–2013	Debrecen	1	(0)
2013–2015	Kecskemét	41	(3)
2015-2016	Gyirmót	1	(0)
2016-17	ETO		
2018	Soproni VSE	12	(0)
2018-2019	Dunaújváros PASE		
2019-2021	Gönyü SE		
2021-2022	Abda		
2022-2023	Kapuvár		
2023-	Győrújbarát SE		
- * Club domestic league appearances and goals as of 20 June 2024

Róbert Varga (born 25 November 1986) is a Hungarian footballer who plays for Győrújbarát SE
