= Zsolt Balázs =

Hungarian footballer

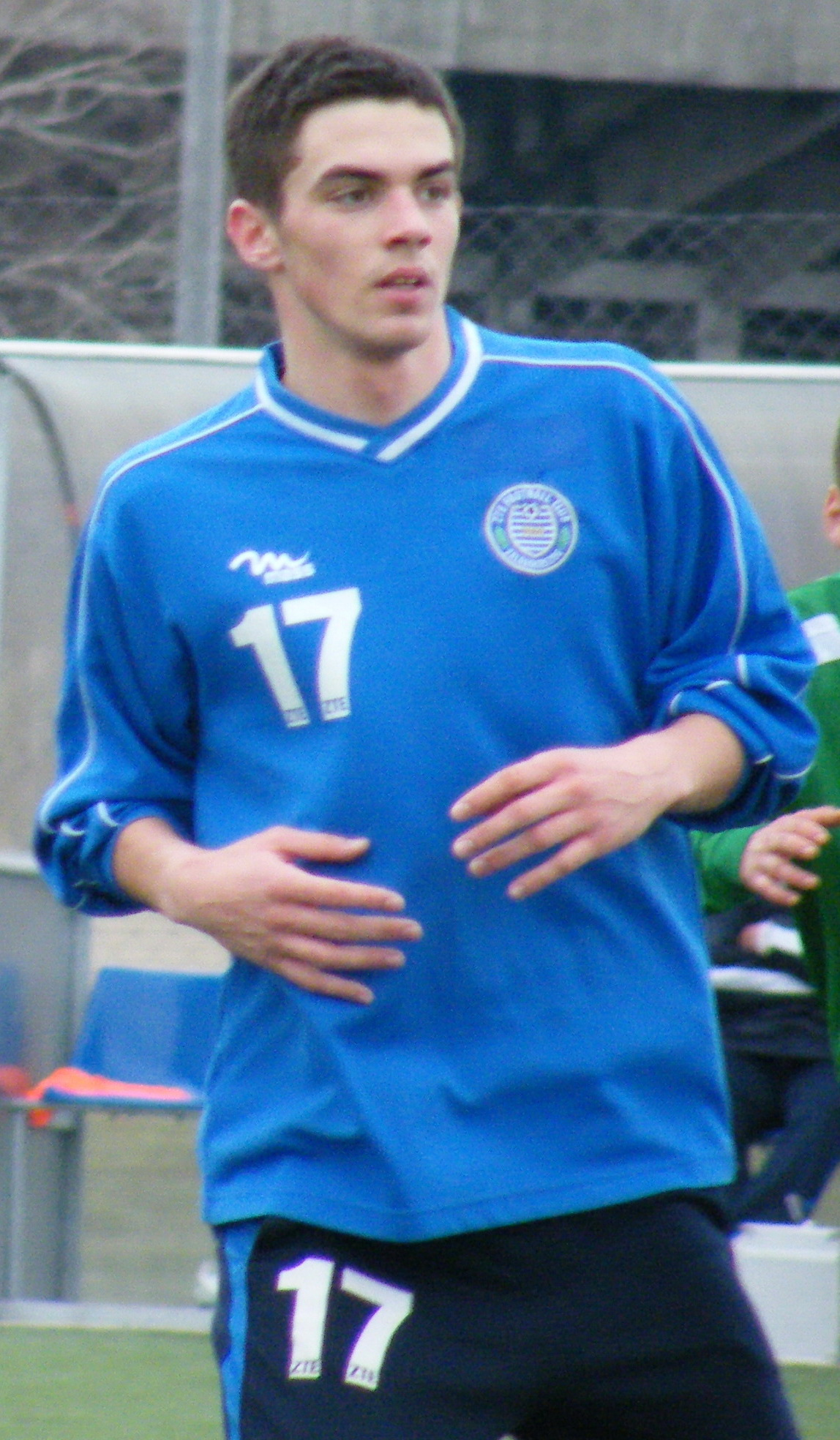
- Zsolt Balázs in 2009

Personal information
- Date of birth: 11 August 1988 (age 38)
- Place of birth: Zalaegerszeg, Hungary
- Height: 1.83 m (6 ft 0 in)
- Position: Forward

Team information
- Current team: Budaörs
- Number: 10

Youth career
- ZTE

Senior career*
Years	Team	Apps	(Gls)
2007–2012	ZTE	116	(27)
2012–2014	Kecskemét	52	(9)
2015–2017	Paks	45	(6)
2016–2017	→ Budapest Honvéd (loan)	9	(0)
2017–2019	ZTE	31	(6)
2018	→ Siófok (loan)	11	(0)
2019	Nafta 1903	5	(0)
2019–2021	Kaposvár	56	(16)
2021–	Budaörs	26	(7)
- * Club domestic league appearances and goals as of 1 May 2022

Zsolt Balázs (born 11 August 1988) is a Hungarian striker who plays for Budaörs.

== Early life ==
His maternal grandfather was László Aradszky singer.

== Career statistics ==
As of 27 June 2020.

Appearances and goals by club, season and competition
Club	Season	League			Cup		Continental		Other		Total	
Club	Season	Division	Apps	Goals	Apps	Goals	Apps	Goals	Apps	Goals	Apps	Goals
Zalaegerszeg	2006–07	Nemzeti Bajnokság I	3	2	0	0	—		0	0	3	2
Zalaegerszeg	2007–08	Nemzeti Bajnokság I	18	1	0	0	—		14	5	32	6
Zalaegerszeg	2008–09	Nemzeti Bajnokság I	23	6	1	0	—		6	1	30	7
Zalaegerszeg	2009–10	Nemzeti Bajnokság I	25	6	7	1	—		4	1	36	8
Zalaegerszeg	2010–11	Nemzeti Bajnokság I	23	8	7	1	1	0	4	0	35	9
Zalaegerszeg	2011–12	Nemzeti Bajnokság I	22	2	1	0	—		2	0	25	2
Zalaegerszeg	2012–13	Nemzeti Bajnokság II	1	1	0	0	—		0	0	1	1
Zalaegerszeg	2017–18	Nemzeti Bajnokság II	16	2	1	3	—		0	0	17	5
Zalaegerszeg	2018–19	Nemzeti Bajnokság II	15	4	2	0	—		0	0	17	4
Zalaegerszeg	Total		146	32	19	5	1	0	30	7	193	42
Kecskemét	2012–13	Nemzeti Bajnokság I	13	3	1	0	—		5	1	19	4
Kecskemét	2013–14	Nemzeti Bajnokság I	23	3	2	0	—		5	5	30	8
Kecskemét	2014–15	Nemzeti Bajnokság I	17	3	3	3	—		3	0	23	6
Kecskemét	Total		53	9	6	3	0	0	13	6	72	18
Paks	2014–15	Nemzeti Bajnokság I	13	2	0	0	—		0	0	13	2
Paks	2015–16	Nemzeti Bajnokság I	31	4	2	1	—		0	0	33	5
Paks	2016–17	Nemzeti Bajnokság I	1	0	0	0	—		0	0	1	0
Paks	Total		45	6	2	1	0	0	0	0	47	7
Budapest Honvéd	2016–17	Nemzeti Bajnokság I	9	0	3	1	—		0	0	12	1
Siófok	2017–18	Nemzeti Bajnokság II	12	0	2	0	—		0	0	14	0
Kaposvár	2019–20	Nemzeti Bajnokság I	22	3	3	1	—		0	0	25	4
Career total			287	50	35	11	1	0	43	13	363	72
