= Gergely Kocsárdi =

Hungarian footballer

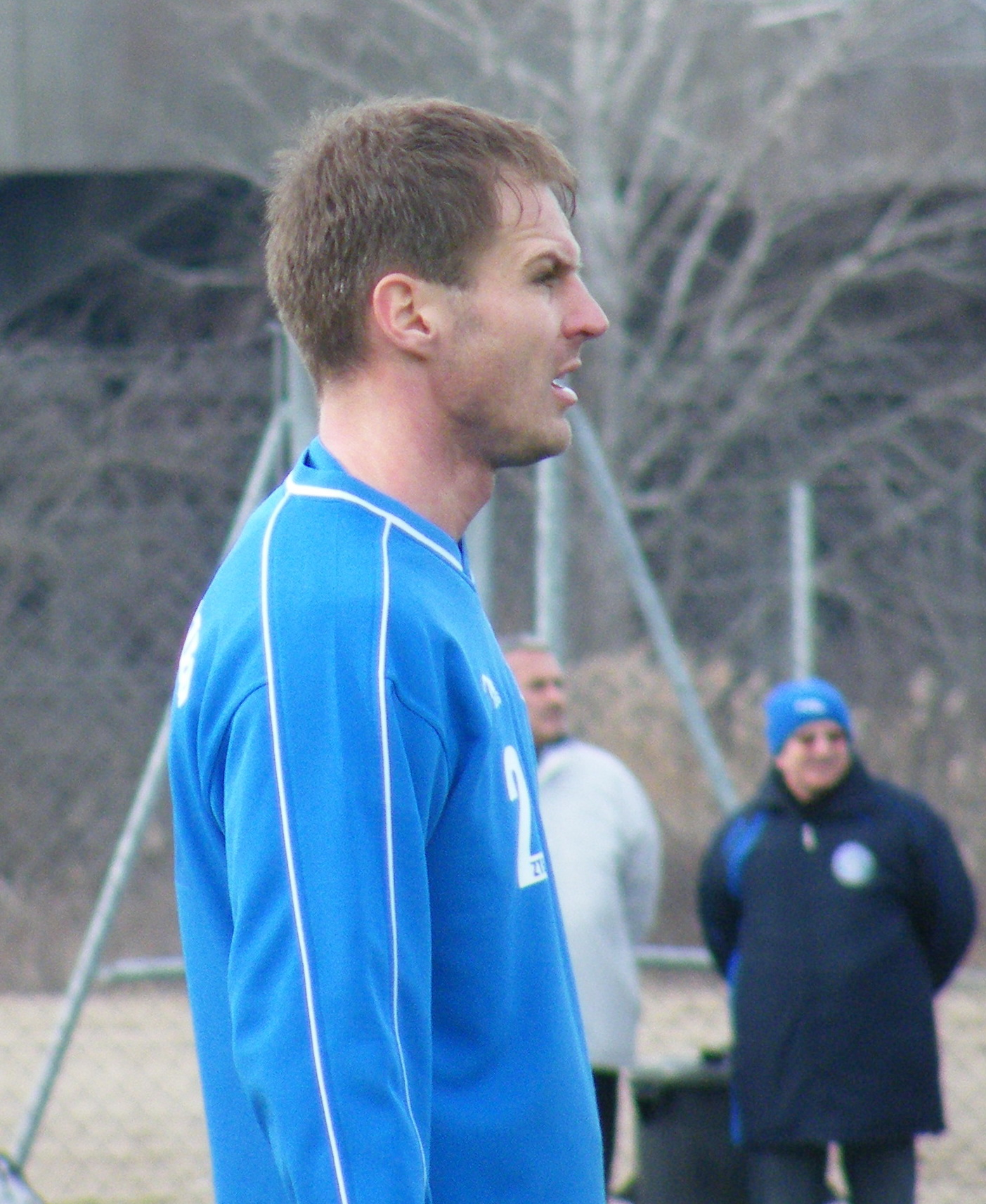

Personal information
- Date of birth: 24 November 1975 (age 50)
- Place of birth: Zalaegerszeg, Hungary
- Height: 1.80 m (5 ft 11 in)
- Position: Defender

Youth career
- Zalaegerszegi TE

Senior career*
| Years | Team | Apps | (Gls) |
| 1993–2007 | Zalaegerszegi TE | 345 | (11) |
| 2007–2008 | NK Nafta Lendava | 18 | (1) |
| 2008–2013 | Zalaegerszegi TE | 138 | (6) |

International career^{‡}
| 1994–1995 | Hungary U-19 | 9 | (0) |
- * Club domestic league appearances and goals as of 27 May 2012 ‡ National team caps and goals as of 16 April 2011

Gergely Kocsárdi (born 24 November 1975 in Zalaegerszeg) is a retired Hungarian football player.

In the season 2007/08, he left Zalaegerszegi TE and join the Slovenian club Nafta Lendava. However, in the second part of the season he decided to return to Zalaegerszegi TE.

Since his return, he played his first match on 29 February 2008 against Újpest FC which they won quite comfortably on the scoreline of 4-1; in front 6000 home fans. From the second part of the season till the end of the season 2007/08, he had featured in 10 matches and he managed to play in 7 matches for a full 90 minutes.

Despite winning the Hungarian Championship in the season 2001/02, and being a member of the Zalaegerszegi TE team which shocked world football when they beat Manchester United in the first leg of the 2002–2003 UEFA Champion's League 3rd preliminary round; he has never managed in this career to win even a single cap for this country.

He was member of the Hungarian under-19 team.

== Career honours ==
- Zalaegerszegi TE
  - Hungarian League (1): 2002

== External sources ==
- Stats from Hungarian Championship at Futball-Adattár
