= Péter Máté (footballer, born 1979) =

Hungarian footballer

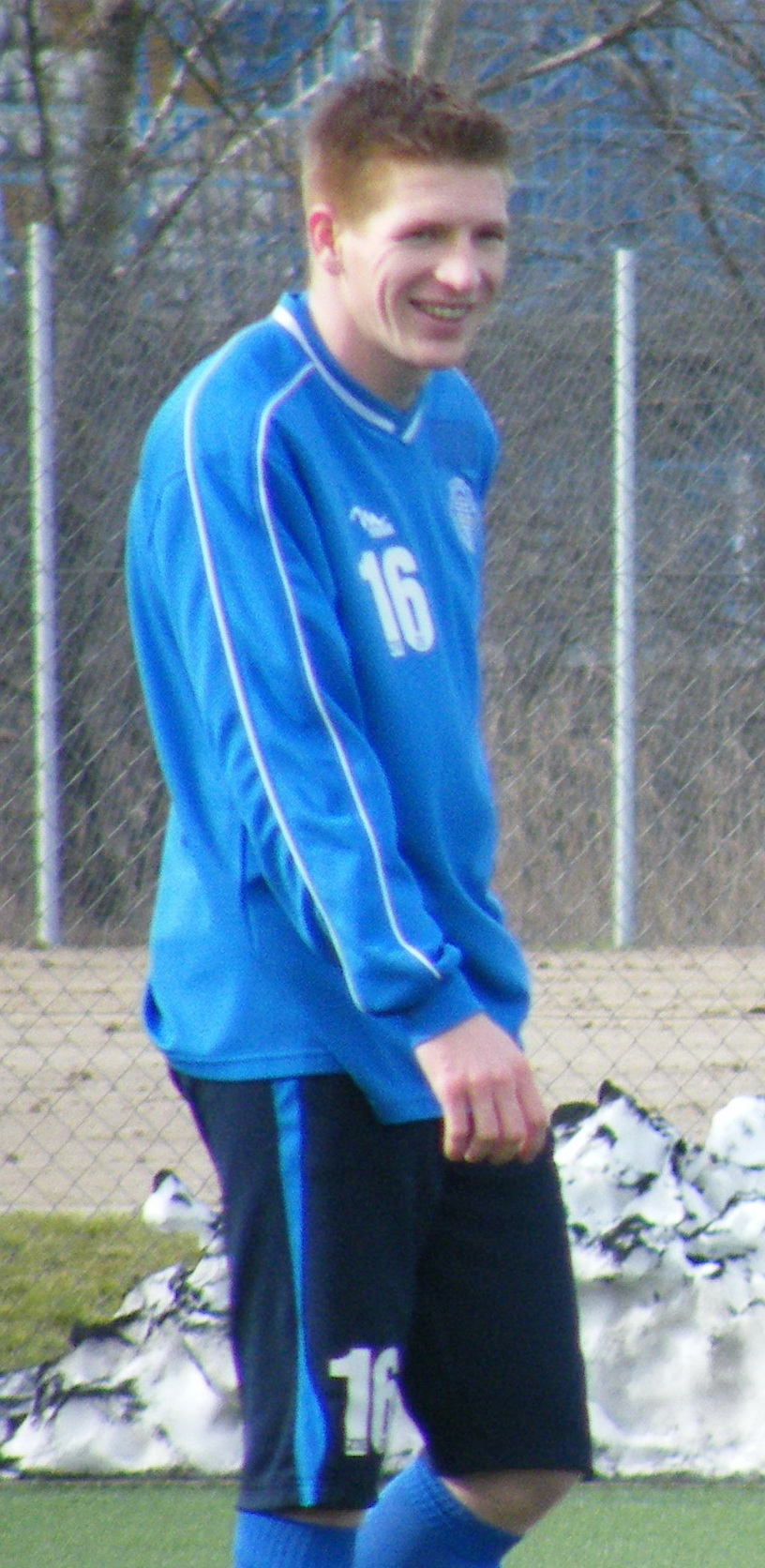
- Máté in 2009

Personal information
- Date of birth: 15 November 1979 (age 46)
- Place of birth: Böhönye, Hungary
- Height: 1.84 m (6 ft 0 in)
- Positions: Midfielder; left winger

Senior career*
Years	Team	Apps	(Gls)
2002–2006	Kaposvár	77	(3)
2006–2011	Zalaegerszeg	116	(6)
2011	Kaposvár	7	(1)
2011–2014	Zalaegerszeg		
2014–2015	Szeged-Csanád		
2015–2016	ASK Oberpetersdorf		
2016–2017	Hódmezővásárhelyi FC		
2018–2023	UFC PTA		
2023–2024	Union St. Aegidi		
- * Club domestic league appearances and goals as of 17 November 2013

Péter Máté (born 15 November 1979) is a Hungarian former professional footballer who played as a midfielder.
