= Adrián Kocsis =

Association football player (born 1991)

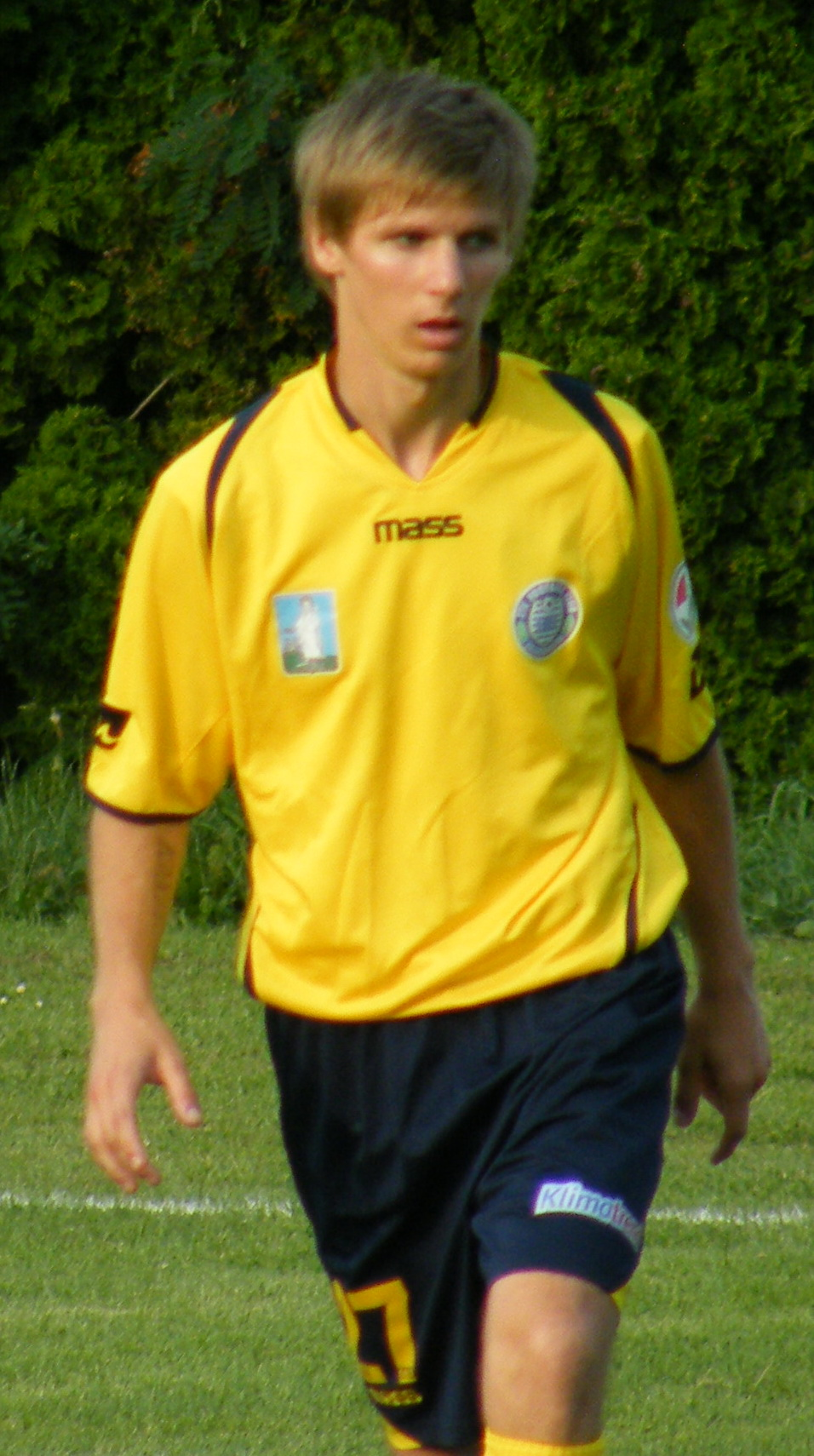

Personal information
- Full name: Adrián Kocsis
- Date of birth: 25 March 1991 (age 35)
- Place of birth: Körmend, Hungary
- Height: 1.78 m (5 ft 10 in)
- Position: Defender

Team information
- Current team: Zalaegerszeg
- Number: 19

Youth career
- 2004–2010: Zalaegerszeg

Senior career*
Years	Team	Apps	(Gls)
2010–	Zalaegerszeg	27	(1)
2010–	→ Zalaegerszeg II	57	(5)
2011–2012	→ Nafta Lendava (loan)	2	(0)

International career
2011	Hungary U-21	1	(0)
- * Club domestic league appearances and goals as of 20 February 2015

Adrián Kocsis (born 25 March 1991) is a Hungarian striker who currently plays for Zalaegerszegi TE.
