= Géza Vlaszák =

Hungarian footballer

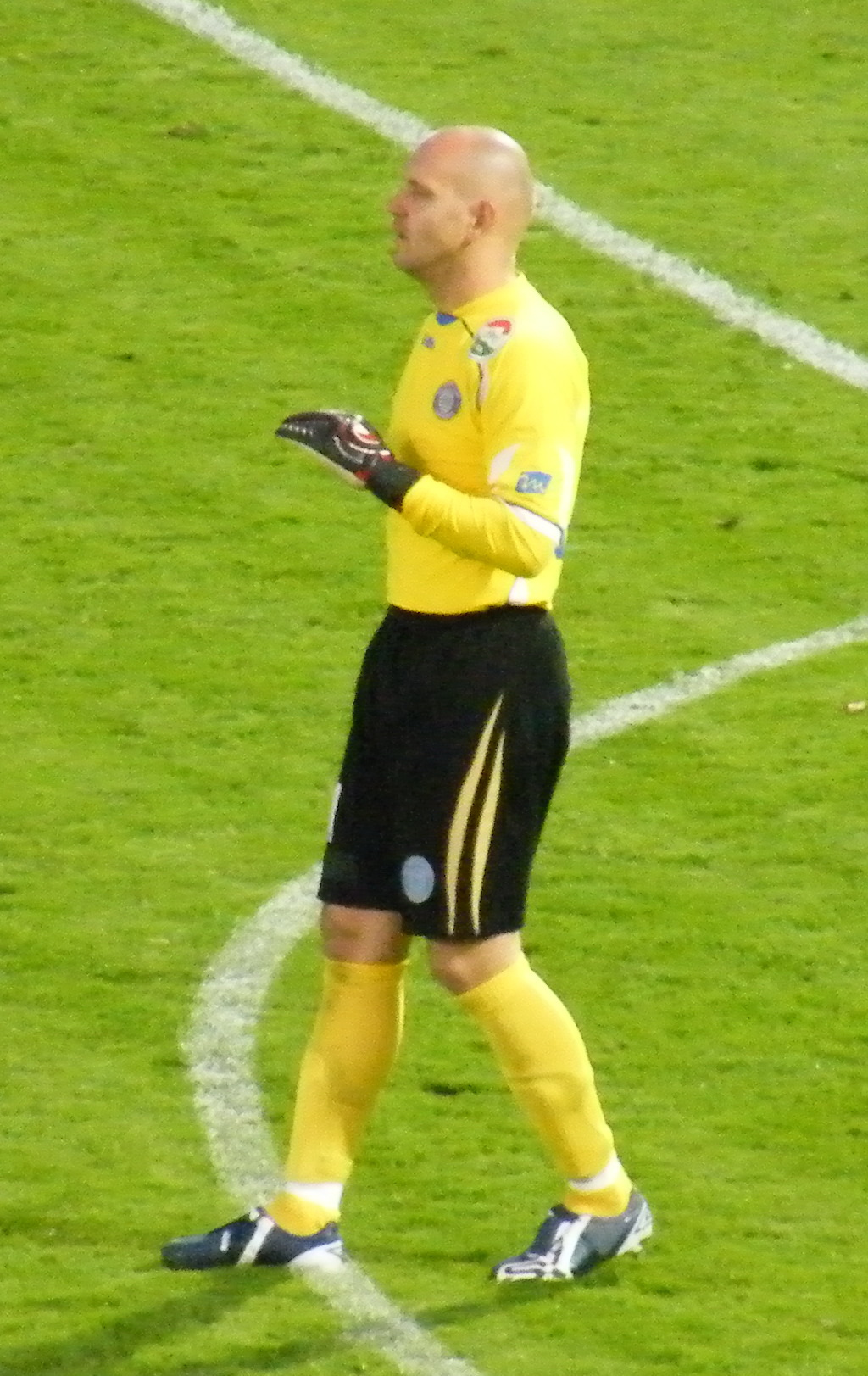

Personal information
- Full name: Géza Vlaszák
- Date of birth: 3 September 1973 (age 53)
- Place of birth: Zalaegerszeg, Hungary
- Height: 1.88 m (6 ft 2 in)
- Position: Goalkeeper

Senior career*
Years	Team	Apps	(Gls)
1993–1994	Keszthelyi Haladás	28	(0)
1994–1995	Nagykanizsa	15	(0)
1995–2000	Zalaegerszeg	124	(0)
2000–2002	MTK	39	(0)
2002–2006	Újpest	119	(0)
2006–2008	AEL	27	(0)
2008–2014	Zalaegerszeg	117	(0)

International career^{‡}
2004–2005	Hungary	5	(0)

Managerial career
- 2014–: Zalaegerszeg (goalkeeper coach)
- * Club domestic league appearances and goals as of 5 August 2015 ‡ National team caps and goals as of 6 September 2006

Vlaszák Géza (born 3 September 1973, Zalaegerszeg) is a Hungarian goalkeeper who currently plays for ZTE FC.

== Biography ==
At the beginning of his career, he defended in the second division, first with Keszthelyi Haladás and then with the team of the Nagykanizsa Oil Miners. In the 1994–95 season, the Kanizsa team advanced to the first division, with Vlaszák being the second goalkeeper. His first match at the forefront was the Soproni LC - Nagykanizsa Oil Miner match played on 17 September 1994, which ended 7–2. ZTE noticed his performance in Nagykanizsa and signed it. In the spring of 1996, even on his new team, he was just a substitute goalkeeper, but he increasingly played himself into the novice. In 1997 and 1998, he did not miss a single match in the league.

He qualified for MTK in 2000, where he was a defining player in his first year, but was forced to take the bench again the following season. For this reason, he switched in 2002 and was certified for Újpest FC . Here he was a basic person again, he was invited to the national team several times. In the summer of 2006, Újpest FC did not extend its contract, so it became freely justifiable.
