= 2011–12 Zalaegerszegi TE season =

Zalaegerszegi TE
2011–12 season
- Chairman: (Hungary) Ferenc Nagy
- Manager: (Hungary) János Csank (until 5 September 2011) (Hungary) László Prukner
- NB 1: 16. (relegated)
- Hungarian Cup: 3. Round
- Hungarian League Cup: Group Stage
- Top goalscorer: League: (Hungary) Péter Máté (5); All: (Hungary) Péter Máté (5)
- Highest home attendance: 3,500 v Debrecen (22 July 2011)
- Lowest home attendance: 150 v Haladás (16 November 2011)
Home colours	Away colours

The 2011–12 season will be Zalaegerszegi TE's 36th competitive season, 18th consecutive season in the OTP Bank Liga and 91st year in existence as a football club.

== First team squad ==
Note: Flags indicate national team as defined under FIFA eligibility rules; some limited exceptions apply. Players may hold more than one non-FIFA nationality.

No.	Pos.	Nation	Player
1	GK	HUN	Géza Vlaszák
2	DF	HUN	Gergely Kocsárdi
3	DF	SRB	Milan Bogunović
4	MF	GEO	Giorgi Ganugrava (loan from Győri ETO FC)
5	FW	MNE	Darko Pavićević
6	MF	ESP	Manu Hervás
7	FW	HUN	Ádám Vittman
8	DF	SVN	Leon Panikvar
10	FW	HUN	Roland Polareczki
11	FW	SRB	Mladen Brkić
12	GK	SVN	Safet Jahić
14	MF	HUN	Tamás Szalai
16	MF	HUN	Péter Máté

No.	Pos.	Nation	Player
17	FW	HUN	Zsolt Balázs
18	DF	HUN	Gergő Kovács
19	DF	HUN	Adrián Kocsis
20	MF	ROU	Mihai Nicorec (loan from Győri ETO FC)
21	DF	HUN	Sándor Hidvégi
23	GK	HUN	Ákos Vörös
24	MF	HUN	Gábor Kovács
25	FW	HUN	Mahir Jasarević
27	DF	HUN	Tamás Turcsik
30	MF	HUN	Szabolcs Csordás
31	MF	HUN	Dénes Szakály (loan from Videoton)
55	MF	HUN	Paolo Mavolo
89	FW	HUN	Dávid Pál

== Transfers ==
=== Summer ===
In: Note: Flags indicate national team as defined under FIFA eligibility rules; some limited exceptions apply. Players may hold more than one non-FIFA nationality.

No.	Pos.	Nation	Player
6	MF	ESP	Manu Hervás (from (Austria) FC Admira Wacker Mödling)
8	FW	AUT	Aleksandar Stanisavljević (from (Austria) First Vienna FC)
12	GK	SVN	Safet Jahič (from (Slovenia) NK Rudar Velenje)
16	MF	HUN	Péter Máté (to Kaposvári Rákóczi FC)
20	DF	EGY	Sameh Sherif (from unknown)
21	DF	HUN	Sándor Hidvégi (to Zalaegerszegi TE)
22	DF	MNE	Radoš Bulatović (from (Serbia) FK Sevojno)
23	FW	GAB	Roguy Méyé (from (France) Paris FC)
24	MF	HUN	Gábor Kovács (to Balatonfüredi FC)
30	MF	HUN	Szabolcs Csordás (from MTK Budapest FC)
31	FW	HUN	Bálint Gaál (from FC Ajka)
31	MF	HUN	Dénes Szakály (loan to Zalaegerszegi TE)
55	FW	HUN	Attila Tököli (loan from Kecskeméti TE)
89	MF	ROU	Vlad Bujor (from (Romania) FC Universitatea Craiova)

Out: Note: Flags indicate national team as defined under FIFA eligibility rules; some limited exceptions apply. Players may hold more than one non-FIFA nationality.

No.	Pos.	Nation	Player
6	DF	CAN	Stefan Cebara (unattached)
8	DF	SVN	Leon Panikvar (to (Scotland) Kilmarnock F.C.)
9	FW	HUN	Attila Simon (loan return to Kecskeméti TE)
13	MF	HUN	Zsolt Barna (loan return to Szigetszentmiklósi TK)
21	MF	HUN	András Horváth (to Szombathelyi Haladás)
22	DF	SVN	Matej Miljatovič (to (Austria) TSV Hartberg)
23	GK	HUN	Gábor Sipos (to Soproni VSE)
25	FW	CUW	Prince Rajcomar (loan to (Netherlands) MVV Maastricht)
28	DF	HUN	Adrián Kocsis (loan to (Slovenia) NK Nafta Lendava)
29	MF	HUN	Gábor Simonfalvi (loan return to Pécsi Mecsek FC)
31	FW	HUN	Bálint Gaál (loan to FC Ajka)
––	FW	HUN	Roland Polareczki (loan to (Slovenia) NK Nafta Lendava)
––	MF	AUT	Emre Okatan (unattached)
––	MF	HUN	Gellért Ivancsics (to Budapest Honvéd FC)
––	GK	HUN	Ádám Szabó (to Kazincbarcikai SC)
––	GK	BIH	Aleksandar Novaković (unattached)
––	DF	HUN	Balázs Nánási (loan to Nyíregyháza Spartacus FC)

=== Winter ===
In: Note: Flags indicate national team as defined under FIFA eligibility rules; some limited exceptions apply. Players may hold more than one non-FIFA nationality.

No.	Pos.	Nation	Player
4	MF	GEO	Giorgi Ganugrava (on loan from Győri ETO FC)
8	DF	SVN	Leon Panikvar (from (Scotland) Kilmarnock F.C.)
10	FW	HUN	Roland Polareczki (loan return from (Slovenia) NK Nafta Lendava)
20	MF	ROU	Mihai Nicorec (on loan from Győri ETO FC)
26	FW	HUN	Ádám Vittman (loan return from FC Ajka)
28	DF	HUN	Adrián Kocsis (loan return from (Slovenia) NK Nafta Lendava)
31	FW	HUN	Bálint Gaál (loan return from FC Ajka)

Out: Note: Flags indicate national team as defined under FIFA eligibility rules; some limited exceptions apply. Players may hold more than one non-FIFA nationality.

No.	Pos.	Nation	Player
1	GK	HUN	Dávid Palásthy (loan return to Dunakanyar-Vác FC)
4	DF	HUN	Róbert Varga (to Kecskeméti TE)
7	MF	AUT	Ahmet Delić (to Soproni VSE)
8	FW	AUT	Aleksandar Stanisavljević (to (Austria) SC Sollenau)
10	MF	MNE	Ivan Delić
11	FW	LVA	Daniils Turkovs (to (Latvia) FK Ventspils)
19	MF	BIH	Đorđe Kamber (to Győri ETO FC)
20	DF	EGY	Sameh Sherif
22	DF	SRB	Radoš Bulatović (to (Serbia) FK Novi Pazar)
23	FW	GAB	Roguy Méyé (to Debreceni VSC)
55	FW	HUN	Attila Tököli (loan return to Kecskeméti TE)
89	MF	ROU	Vlad Bujor (to (Romania) FCM Târgu Mureș)

- List of Hungarian football transfer summer 2011
- List of Hungarian football transfers winter 2011–12

== Statistics ==
=== Appearances and goals ===
Last updated on 27 May 2012.

No.	Pos	Nat	Player	Total		OTP Bank Liga		Hungarian Cup		League Cup	
No.	Pos	Nat	Player	Apps	Goals	Apps	Goals	Apps	Goals	Apps	Goals
1	GK	(Hungary) HUN	Géza Vlaszák	12	-23	12	-23	0	0	0	0
2	DF	(Hungary) HUN	Gergely Kocsárdi	29	3	28	3	1	0	0	0
3	DF	(Serbia) SRB	Milan Bogunović	21	0	20	0	1	0	0	0
4	MF	(Georgia (country)) GEO	Giorgi Ganugrava	12	0	12	0	0	0	0	0
5	FW	(Montenegro) MNE	Darko Pavićević	11	1	11	1	0	0	0	0
6	MF	(Spain) ESP	Manu Hervás	23	0	19	0	1	0	3	0
7	FW	(Hungary) HUN	Ádám Vittman	6	0	6	0	0	0	0	0
8	DF	(Slovenia) SVN	Leon Panikvar	4	0	4	0	0	0	0	0
10	FW	(Hungary) HUN	Roland Polareczki	10	0	10	0	0	0	0	0
11	FW	(Serbia) SRB	Mladen Brkić	8	1	8	1	0	0	0	0
12	GK	(Slovenia) SVN	Safet Jahić	21	-42	19	-39	1	-1	1	-2
14	MF	(Hungary) HUN	Tamás Szalai	22	1	20	0	1	0	1	1
16	MF	(Hungary) HUN	Péter Máté	21	5	20	5	1	0	0	0
17	FW	(Hungary) HUN	Zsolt Balázs	25	2	22	2	1	0	2	0
18	DF	(Hungary) HUN	Gergő Kovács	16	0	15	0	0	0	1	0
19	DF	(Hungary) HUN	Adrián Kocsis	4	0	4	0	0	0	0	0
20	MF	(Romania) ROU	Mihai Nicorec	10	0	10	0	0	0	0	0
21	DF	(Hungary) HUN	Sándor Hidvégi	20	0	19	0	1	0	0	0
23	GK	(Hungary) HUN	Ákos Vörös	3	-5	1	-3	0	0	2	-2
24	MF	(Hungary) HUN	Gábor Kovács	14	3	11	0	0	0	3	3
25	FW	(Hungary) HUN	Mahir Jasarević	7	1	4	1	0	0	3	0
27	DF	(Hungary) HUN	Tamás Turcsik	8	0	6	0	0	0	2	0
30	MF	(Hungary) HUN	Szabolcs Csordás	6	0	1	0	0	0	5	0
31	MF	(Hungary) HUN	Dénes Szakály	22	0	21	0	1	0	0	0
55	MF	(Italy) ITA	Paolo Mavolo	6	0	1	0	0	0	5	0
89	FW	(Hungary) HUN	Dávid Pál	10	0	7	0	0	0	3	0
Youth players:
7	MF	(Serbia) SRB	Marko Milosavljević	3	0	0	0	0	0	3	0
8	DF	(Hungary) HUN	Dániel Juhász	6	0	0	0	0	0	6	0
16	DF	(Hungary) HUN	Máté Major	3	0	0	0	0	0	3	0
17	MF	(Hungary) HUN	Ádám Krajczár	6	0	0	0	0	0	6	0
21	MF	(Hungary) HUN	Bence Szabó	4	0	0	0	0	0	4	0
25	MF	(Hungary) HUN	Patrik Horváth	3	0	0	0	0	0	3	0
26	DF	(Hungary) HUN	Kristóf Kovács	5	0	0	0	0	0	5	0
27	FW	(Hungary) HUN	Benjámin Darabos	1	0	0	0	0	0	1	0
Players currently out on loan
25	FW	(Curaçao) CUW	Prince Rajcomar	1	0	1	0	0	0	0	0
Players no longer at the club:
1	GK	(Hungary) HUN	Dávid Palásthy	5	-14	0	0	0	0	5	-14
4	DF	(Hungary) HUN	Róbert Varga	4	1	3	1	0	0	1	0
7	MF	(Austria) AUT	Ahmet Delić	14	0	9	0	1	0	4	0
8	FW	(Austria) AUT	Aleksandar Stanisavljević	4	0	3	0	0	0	1	0
10	MF	(Montenegro) MNE	Ivan Delić	7	0	3	0	0	0	4	0
11	FW	(Latvia) LVA	Daniils Turkovs	16	2	13	2	1	0	2	0
19	MF	(Bosnia and Herzegovina) BIH	Đorđe Kamber	18	4	17	4	1	0	0	0
20	DF	(Egypt) EGY	Sameh Sherif	7	0	3	0	0	0	4	0
21	MF	(Hungary) HUN	András Horváth	7	0	7	0	0	0	0	0
22	DF	(Serbia) SRB	Radoš Bulatović	12	0	10	0	0	0	2	0
23	FW	(Gabon) GAB	Roguy Méyé	13	3	13	3	0	0	0	0
55	FW	(Hungary) HUN	Attila Tököli	11	1	11	1	0	0	0	0
89	MF	(Romania) ROU	Vlad Bujor	15	2	10	0	1	0	4	2

=== Top scorers ===
Includes all competitive matches. The list is sorted by shirt number when total goals are equal.

Last updated on 27 May 2012

Position	Nation	Number	Name	OTP Bank Liga	Hungarian Cup	League Cup	Total
1	(Hungary)	16	Péter Máté	5	0	0	5
2	(Bosnia and Herzegovina)	19	Đorđe Kamber	4	0	0	4
3	(Hungary)	24	Gábor Kovács	0	0	3	3
4	(Gabon)	23	Roguy Méyé	3	0	0	3
5	(Hungary)	2	Gergely Kocsárdi	3	0	0	3
6	(Latvia)	11	Daniils Turkovs	2	0	0	2
7	(Hungary)	17	Zsolt Balázs	2	0	0	2
8	(Romania)	89	Vlad Bujor	0	0	2	2
9	(Hungary)	4	Róbert Varga	1	0	0	1
10	(Hungary)	55	Attila Tököli	1	0	0	1
11	(Serbia)	11	Mladen Brkić	1	0	0	1
12	(Hungary)	25	Mahir Jasarević	1	0	0	1
13	(Montenegro)	5	Darko Pavićević	1	0	0	1
14	(Hungary)	14	Tamás Szalai	0	0	1	1
/	/	/	Own Goals	1	0	0	1
			TOTALS	25	0	6	31

=== Disciplinary record ===
Includes all competitive matches. Players with 1 card or more included only.

Last updated on 27 May 2012

Position	Nation	Number	Name	OTP Bank Liga		Hungarian Cup		League Cup		Total (Hu Total)	
Position	Nation	Number	Name	Booked	Sent off (straight red)	Booked	Sent off (straight red)	Booked	Sent off (straight red)	Booked	Sent off (straight red)
GK	(Hungary)	1	Géza Vlaszák	1	0	0	0	0	0	1 (1)	0 (0)
DF	(Hungary)	2	Gergely Kocsárdi	5	1	0	0	0	0	5 (5)	1 (1)
DF	(Serbia)	3	Milan Bogunović	4	3	0	0	0	0	4 (4)	3 (3)
MF	(Georgia (country))	4	Giorgi Ganugrava	2	0	0	0	0	0	2 (2)	0 (0)
DF	(Hungary)	4	Róbert Varga	1	0	0	0	0	0	1 (1)	0 (0)
FW	(Montenegro)	5	Darko Pavićević	2	0	0	0	0	0	2 (2)	0 (0)
MF	(Spain)	6	Manu Hervás	2	0	0	0	0	0	2 (2)	0 (0)
FW	(Austria)	8	Aleksandar Stanisavljević	1	0	0	0	0	0	1 (1)	0 (0)
FW	(Hungary)	10	Roland Polareczki	2	0	0	0	0	0	2 (2)	0 (0)
MF	(Montenegro)	10	Ivan Delić	0	0	0	0	1	0	1 (0)	0 (0)
FW	(Serbia)	11	Mladen Brkić	3	0	0	0	0	0	3 (3)	0 (0)
GK	(Slovenia)	12	Safet Jahić	0	1	0	0	1	0	1 (0)	1 (1)
MF	(Italy)	13	Paolo Mavolo	0	0	0	0	1	0	1 (0)	0 (0)
MF	(Hungary)	14	Tamás Szalai	6	0	0	0	0	0	6 (6)	0 (0)
MF	(Hungary)	15	Szabolcs Csordás	0	0	0	0	1	0	1 (0)	0 (0)
MF	(Hungary)	16	Péter Máté	10	1	0	0	0	0	10 (10)	1 (1)
DF	(Hungary)	16	Máté Major	0	0	0	0	1	1	1 (0)	1 (0)
FW	(Hungary)	17	Zsolt Balázs	2	1	0	0	0	0	2 (2)	1 (1)
MF	(Hungary)	17	Ádám Krajczár	0	0	0	0	1	0	1 (0)	0 (0)
DF	(Hungary)	18	Gergő Kovács	3	0	0	0	1	0	4 (3)	0 (0)
MF	(Bosnia and Herzegovina)	19	Đorđe Kamber	4	0	0	0	0	0	4 (4)	0 (0)
MF	(Romania)	20	Mihai Nicorec	1	0	0	0	0	0	1 (1)	0 (0)
DF	(Egypt)	20	Sameh Sherif	1	0	0	0	0	0	1 (1)	0 (0)
MF	(Hungary)	21	András Horváth	1	0	0	0	0	0	1 (1)	0 (0)
MF	(Hungary)	21	Bence Szabó	0	0	0	0	1	0	1 (0)	0 (0)
DF	(Serbia)	22	Radoš Bulatović	4	1	0	0	0	0	4 (4)	1 (1)
FW	(Gabon)	23	Roguy Méyé	3	1	0	0	0	0	3 (3)	1 (1)
MF	(Hungary)	24	Gábor Kovács	2	0	0	0	0	0	2 (2)	0 (0)
MF	(Hungary)	25	Mahir Jasarević	1	0	0	0	3	1	4 (1)	1 (0)
FW	(Curaçao)	25	Prince Rajcomar	1	0	0	0	0	0	1 (1)	0 (0)
MF	(Hungary)	31	Dénes Szakály	5	0	0	0	0	0	5 (5)	0 (0)
FW	(Hungary)	55	Attila Tököli	4	0	0	0	0	0	4 (4)	0 (0)
DF	(Romania)	87	Vlad Bujor	1	0	0	0	1	0	2 (1)	0 (0)
			TOTALS	72	9	0	0	12	2	84 (72)	11 (9)

=== Overall ===
Games played	37 (30 OTP Bank Liga, 1 Hungarian Cup and 6 Hungarian League Cup)
Games won	2 (1 OTP Bank Liga, 0 Hungarian Cup and 1 Hungarian League Cup)
Games drawn	11 (10 OTP Bank Liga, 0 Hungarian Cup and 1 Hungarian League Cup)
Games lost	24 (19 OTP Bank Liga, 1 Hungarian Cup and 4 Hungarian League Cup)
Goals scored	31
Goals conceded	84
Goal difference	-53
Yellow cards	84
Red cards	11
Worst discipline	(Hungary) Péter Máté (10 (yellow card) , 1 (red card) )
Best result	3–0 (H) v Szombathelyi Haladás - League Cup - 16-11-2011
Worst result	0–8 (H) v Lombard-Pápa TFC - League Cup - 07-09-2011
Most appearances	(Hungary) Gergely Kocsárdi (29 appearances)
Top scorer	(Hungary) Péter Máté (5 goal)
Points	17/111 (15.32%)

Last updated: 27 May 2012

== Nemzeti Bajnokság I ==
=== Matches ===
16 July 2011 1	Diósgyőri VTK	4–1	Zalaegerszegi TE	Miskolc, Borsod-Abaúj-Zemplén County
17:30 CET (UTC+01)	Seydi 28' 45'; Luque 42'; Gohér 89'	(Report)	Varga 86'	Stadium: DVTK Stadion; Attendance: 7,000; Referee: (Hungary) István Vad

22 July 2011 2	Zalaegerszegi TE	0–2	Debreceni VSC	Zalaegerszeg, Zala County
18:00 CET (UTC+01)		(Report)	Kulcsár 77'; Yannick 79'	Stadium: ZTE Arena; Attendance: 3,500; Referee: (Hungary) Zsolt Szabó

30 July 2011 3	Pécsi Mecsek FC	2–1	Zalaegerszegi TE	Pécs, Baranya County
19:00 CET (UTC+01)	Horváth 23'; Gyánó 80' (pen.)	(Report)	Kamber 37'	Stadium: Stadion PMFC; Attendance: 3,000; Referee: (Hungary) Zoltán J. Kovács

5 August 2011 4	Zalaegerszegi TE	0–4	Budapest Honvéd FC	Zalaegerszeg, Zala County
18:00 CET (UTC+01)		(Report)	Délczeg 35'; Danilo 64' (pen.); Abass 74'; Hidi 90+2'	Stadium: ZTE Arena; Attendance: 2,500; Referee: (Hungary) Sándor Andó-Szabó

13 August 2011 5	Szombathelyi Haladás	1–0	Zalaegerszegi TE	Szombathely, Vas County
19:00 CET (UTC+01)	Kenesei 70'	(Report)		Stadium: Rohonci Street Stadium; Attendance: 7,000; Referee: (Hungary) Péter Solymosi

19 August 2011 6	Zalaegerszegi TE	1–1	Vasas SC	Zalaegerszeg, Zala County
18:00 CET (UTC+01)	Méyé 8' (pen.)	(Report)	Šimić 84' (pen.)	Stadium: ZTE Arena; Attendance: 2,900; Referee: (Hungary) Viktor Kassai

26 August 2011 7	Győri ETO FC	5–1	Zalaegerszegi TE	Győr, Győr-Moson-Sopron County
18:00 CET (UTC+01)	Völgyi 17' 73'; Aleksidze 34'; Babić 66'; Ahjupera 76'	(Report)	Tököli 48'	Stadium: ETO Park; Attendance: 4,000; Referee: (Hungary) Tamás Bognár

11 September 2011 8	Ferencvárosi TC	2–0	Zalaegerszegi TE	Budapest, Pest County
18:00 CET (UTC+01)	Oláh 66'; Tóth 75'	(Report)		Stadium: Stadion Albert Flórián; Attendance: 4,000; Referee: (Hungary) Zsolt Szabó

17 September 2011 9	Zalaegerszegi TE	1–1	Kecskeméti TE	Zalaegerszeg, Zala County
16:00 CET (UTC+01)	Balázs 40'	(Report)	Lencse 11'	Stadium: ZTE Arena; Attendance: 3,000; Referee: (Hungary) Mihály Fábián

23 September 2011 10	Videoton FC	4–1	Zalaegerszegi TE	Székesfehérvár, Fejér County
18:00 CET (UTC+01)	Fernández 31'; Sándor 51'; Alves 56' 71'	(Report)	Máté 88'	Stadium: Stadion Sóstói; Attendance: 3,262; Referee: (Chile) Alvaro Miquel Garcia

1 October 2011 11	Zalaegerszegi TE	1–1	Lombard-Pápa TFC	Zalaegerszeg, Zala County
18:00 CET (UTC+01)	Turkovs 39'	(Report)	Dlusztus 32'	Stadium: ZTE Arena; Attendance: 2,000; Referee: (Hungary) Zoltán J. Kovács

16 October 2011 12	Újpest FC	4–2	Zalaegerszegi TE	Budapest, Pest County
16:00 CET (UTC+01)	Rajczi 6' 65' (pen.); Simon 23'; Marković 69'	(Report)	Kamber 61' 75'	Stadium: Szusza Ferenc Stadium; Attendance: 2,500; Referee: (Hungary) Szabolcs Szilasi

22 October 2011 13	Zalaegerszegi TE	1–1	BFC Siófok	Zalaegerszeg, Zala County
17:00 CET (UTC+01)	Méyé 87' (pen.)	(Report)	Szabó 45'	Stadium: ZTE Arena; Attendance: 2,656; Referee: (Hungary) Ádám Németh

29 October 2011 14	Paksi SE	4–2	Zalaegerszegi TE	Paks, Tolna County
17:00 CET (UTC+01)	Bartha 33'; Szatmári 48'; Magasföldi 71'; Kiss 81'	(Report)	Máté 53' 56'	Stadium: Stadion PSE; Attendance: 1,620; Referee: (Hungary) Roland Veizer

5 November 2011 15	Zalaegerszegi TE	1–1	Kaposvári Rákóczi FC	Zalaegerszeg, Zala County
17:00 CET (UTC+01)	Méyé 30'	(Report)	Bőle 15'	Stadium: ZTE Arena; Attendance: 3,124; Referee: (Hungary) Péter Solymosi

19 November 2011 16	Zalaegerszegi TE	1–1	Diósgyőri VTK	Zalaegerszeg, Zala County
16:00 CET (UTC+01)	Kocsárdi 54' (pen.)	(Report)	Luque 43' (pen.)	Stadium: ZTE Arena; Attendance: 3,276; Referee: (Hungary) János Takács

26 November 2011 17	Debreceni VSC	5–2	Zalaegerszegi TE	Debrecen, Hajdú-Bihar County
15:00 CET (UTC+01)	Nikolić 46' 49' 58'; Nagy 58'; Coulibaly 60' (pen.)	(Report)	Turkovs 17'; Kamber 29'	Stadium: Stadion Oláh Gábor Út; Attendance: 5,500; Referee: (Hungary) József Berger

3 March 2012 18	Zalaegerszegi TE	0–0	Pécsi Mecsek FC	Zalaegerszeg, Zala County
15:00 CET (UTC+01)		(Report)		Stadium: ZTE Arena; Attendance: 3,500; Referee: (Hungary) Ádám Németh

10 March 2012 19	Budapest Honvéd FC	2–0	Zalaegerszegi TE	Budapest, Pest County
15:00 CET (UTC+01)	Ivancsics 20' 25' (pen.)	(Report)		Stadium: Bozsik Stadion; Attendance: 1,000; Referee: (Hungary) Roland Veizer

17 March 2012 20	Zalaegerszegi TE	1–1	Szombathelyi Haladás	Zalaegerszeg, Zala County
17:30 CET (UTC+01)	Balázs 35'	(Report)	Halmosi 13'	Stadium: ZTE Arena; Attendance: 6,082; Referee: (Hungary) István Vad

24 March 2012 21	Vasas SC	3–2	Zalaegerszegi TE	Budapest, Pest County
17:00 CET (UTC+01)	Tóth 7'; Dajić 77'; Kovács 90+2'	(Report)	Jasarevic 72'; Brkić 75'	Stadium: Stadion Rudolf Illovszky; Attendance: 1,500; Referee: (Hungary) Ádám Radványi

31 March 2012 22	Zalaegerszegi TE	0–2	Győri ETO FC	Zalaegerszeg, Zala County
17:30 CET (UTC+01)		(Report)	Kamber 4'; Trajković 67'	Stadium: ZTE Arena; Attendance: 2,000; Referee: (Hungary) Szabolcs Szilasi

8 April 2012 23	Zalaegerszegi TE	2–3	Ferencvárosi TC	Zalaegerszeg, Zala County
18:00 CET (UTC+01)	Kocsárdi 42'; Máté 42'	(Report)	Šimić 61'; Hakola 71' 90+2'	Stadium: ZTE Arena; Attendance: 4,286; Referee: (Hungary) Tamás Bognár

14 April 2012 24	Kecskeméti TE	2–0	Zalaegerszegi TE	Kecskemét, Bács-Kiskun County
17:00 CET (UTC+01)	Lencse 5'; Litsingi 64'	(Report)		Stadium: Széktói Stadion; Attendance: 2,500; Referee: (Hungary) Balázs Böcskei

21 April 2012 25	Zalaegerszegi TE	0–2	Videoton FC	Zalaegerszeg, Zala County
15:00 CET (UTC+01)		(Report)	Nikolić 41' (pen.); Gosztonyi 73'	Stadium: ZTE Arena; Attendance: 4,000; Referee: (Hungary) Gábor Oláh

28 April 2012 26	Lombard-Pápa TFC	0–1	Zalaegerszegi TE	Pápa, Veszprém County
18:00 CET (UTC+01)		(Report)	Pavićević 12'	Stadium: Stadion Várkerti; Attendance: 800; Referee: (Hungary) Roland Veizer

5 May 2012 27	Zalaegerszegi TE	1–1	Újpest FC	Zalaegerszeg, Zala County
17:00 CET (UTC+01)	Máté 46'	(Report)	Vasiljević 75' (pen.)	Stadium: ZTE Arena; Attendance: 2,235; Referee: (Hungary) Sándor Andó-Szabó

12 May 2012 28	BFC Siófok	2–0	Zalaegerszegi TE	Siófok, Somogy County
18:00 CET (UTC+01)	Melczer 21'; Pál 47'	(Report)		Stadium: Révész Street Stadium; Attendance: 300; Referee: (Hungary) Mihály Fábián

20 May 2012 29	Zalaegerszegi TE	1–1	Paksi SE	Zalaegerszeg, Zala County
15:00 CET (UTC+01)	Kocsárdi 18'	(Report)	Szatmári 82'	Stadium: ZTE Arena; Attendance: 1,241; Referee: (Qatar) Banjari Mohammed Al-Dosari

27 May 2012 30	Kaposvári Rákóczi FC	3–1	Zalaegerszegi TE	Kaposvár, Somogy County
18:00 CET (UTC+01)	Grumić 4' 20'; Graszl 62' (pen.)	(Report)	Okuka 10' (o.g.)	Stadium: Stadion Kaposvár Rákóczi; Attendance: 2,000; Referee: (Hungary) Roland Veizer

=== Classification ===
Pos	Team	Pld	W	D	L	GF	GA	GD	Pts	Qualification or relegation
12	Pécs	30	8	10	12	36	50	−14	34	
13	Újpest	30	8	8	14	34	46	−12	32	
14	Pápa	30	8	6	16	26	40	−14	30	
15	Vasas (Note: Vasas were deducted 2 points due unauthorized play of Haris Mehmedagić.) (R)	30	5	9	16	29	51	−22	22	Relegation to Nemzeti Bajnokság II
16	ZTE (R)	30	1	10	19	25	65	−40	13	Relegation to Nemzeti Bajnokság II

Source: MLSZ (in Hungarian)
Rules for classification: 1st points; 2nd overall wins; 3rd goal difference; 4th goals scored
(R) Relegated

=== Results summary ===
Overall								Home						Away					
Pld	W	D	L	GF	GA	GD	Pts	W	D	L	GF	GA	GD	W	D	L	GF	GA	GD
29	1	10	18	24	62	−38	13	0	10	5	11	22	−11	1	0	13	13	40	−27

Last updated: 20 May 2012.
Source: NB1

=== Results by round ===
Round	1	2	3	4	5	6	7	8	9	10	11	12	13	14	15	16	17	18	19	20	21	22	23	24	25	26	27	28	29	30
Ground	A	H	A	H	A	H	A	A	H	A	H	A	H	A	H	H	A	H	A	H	A	H	H	A	H	A	H	A	H	A
Result	L	L	L	L	L	D	L	L	D	L	D	L	D	L	D	D	L	D	L	D	L	L	L	L	L	W	D	L	D	
Position	16	16	15	16	16	16	16	16	16	16	16	16	16	16	16	16	16	16	16	16	16	16	16	16	16	16	16	16	16	16

Updated to match(es) played on 27 May 2012. Source: Matches
A = Away; H = Home; W = Win; D = Draw; L = Loss

== Hungarian Cup ==
28 September 2011 3	Kaposvári Rákóczi FC II	1–0	Zalaegerszegi TE	Kaposvár, Somogy County
15:30	Bőle 90+1'	(Report)		Stadium: Stadion Kaposvár Rákóczi; Attendance: 200; Referee: (Hungary) Béla Botló

== League Cup ==
=== Matches ===
31 August 2011 1	Szombathelyi Haladás	2–1	Zalaegerszegi TE	Szombathely, Vas County
18:00	Simon 67'; Czafit 77'	(Report)	Kovács 36'	Stadium: Rohonci Street Stadium; Attendance: 500; Referee: (Hungary) Krisztián Pánczél

7 September 2011 2	Zalaegerszegi TE	0–8	Lombard-Pápa TFC	Zalaegerszeg, Zala County
17:00		(Report)	Žuļevs 11' 66'; Varga 41'; Lovrencsics 49' 52'; Szabó 56' 86'; Marić 81'	Stadium: ZTE Arena; Attendance: 300; Referee: (Hungary) Csaba Pintér

5 September 2011 3	Zalaegerszegi TE	1–1	Győri ETO FC	Zalaegerszeg, Zala County
17:00	Bujor 12'	(Report)	Kiss 68'	Stadium: ZTE Arena; Attendance: 200; Referee: (Hungary) Gábor Kovács

12 September 2011 4	Győri ETO FC	3–1	Zalaegerszegi TE	Győr, Győr-Moson-Sopron County
15:00	Kiss 7'; Serfőző 52' 54'	(Report)	Szalai 90'	Stadium: ETO Park; Attendance: 300; Referee: (Hungary) Tibor Farkas

9 November 2011 5	Lombard-Pápa TFC	4–0	Zalaegerszegi TE	Pápa, Veszprém County
16:00	Lovrencsics 33' 41'; Ferenczi 45' 56'	(Report)		Stadium: Stadion Várkerti; Attendance: 100; Referee: (Hungary) Gyöngyi Gaál

16 November 2011 6	Zalaegerszegi TE	3–0	Szombathelyi Haladás	Zalaegerszeg, Zala County
13:00	Kovács 25' 44'; Bujor 73'	(Report)		Stadium: ZTE Arena; Attendance: 150; Referee: (Hungary) Gábor Barna

=== Classification ===
Pos	Team	Pld	W	D	L	GF	GA	GD	Pts	Qualification
1	Lombard-Pápa	6	4	1	1	16	3	+13	13	Advance to knockout phase
2	Győri ETO FC	6	2	3	1	9	8	+1	9	
3	Szombathelyi Haladás	6	2	1	3	7	9	−2	7	
4	Zalaegerszegi TE	6	1	1	4	6	18	−12	4	

Rules for classification: 1) points; 2) goal difference; 3) number of goals scored.
