= 2015–16 Magyar Kupa =

Tournament details
- Country: Hungary
- Dates: 5 August 2015 – 14 May 2016
- Teams: 111

Final positions
- Champions: Ferencváros (22nd title)
- Runners-up: Újpest

Tournament statistics
- Matches played: 111
- Goals scored: 438 (3.95 per match)
- Top goal scorer: (Hungary) Bence Katona (7 goals)
- All statistics correct as of 18 November 2015.

The 2015–16 Magyar Kupa (English: Hungarian Cup) was the 76th season of Hungary's annual knock-out cup football competition. It started with the first match of the first round on 5 August 2015 and will end with the final held on 14 May 2016 at Groupama Aréna, Budapest. Ferencváros are the defending champions, having won their 21st cup competition last season. The winner of the competition will qualify for the first qualifying round of the 2016–17 UEFA Europa League. Teams which are involved in 2015–16 UEFA Champions League (Videoton) and 2015–16 UEFA Europa League (Ferencváros, MTK and Debrecen) joined only in the third round.

== Format ==
The tournament rounds will be played in knockout system. The first three-round and the final will consist one-leg (in the first three-round lower ranked team or if the teams are equalled first-drawn team plays home). In the rounds 4 to 6, each tie is played over two legs, with each team playing one leg at home.
In the first round professional teams (from 2015–16 Nemzeti Bajnokság I and 2015–16 Nemzeti Bajnokság II) cannot be paired with each other. In the second and third round any remaining teams from 2015–16 Nemzeti Bajnokság I cannot be paired with each other.

=== Tie-breaker criteria ===
In the first three rounds and the final the team that scores more goals advances to the next round (in the final the team wins the cup). If the score is level, then thirty minutes of extra time is played, divided into two fifteen-minutes halves. If the score is level again after extra time, the tie is decided by penalty shoot-out.
In the round 4 to 6 the team that scores more goals on aggregate over the two legs advances to the next round. If the aggregate score is level, the away goals rule is applied, i.e., the team that scores more goals away from home over the two legs advances. If away goals are also equal, then thirty minutes of extra time is played, divided into two fifteen-minutes halves. The away goals rule is again applied after extra time, i.e., if there are goals scored during extra time and the aggregate score is still level, the visiting team advances by virtue of more away goals scored. If no goals are scored during extra time, the tie is decided by penalty shoot-out.

== Round of 128 ==
Matches were played on 5, 9, 11, 12 and 13 August 2015 and involved the teams qualified through the local cup competitions during the previous season, Nemzeti Bajnokság III, Nemzeti Bajnokság II and the Nemzeti Bajnokság I teams.

=== Draw ===
The draw for the first round was held on 21 July 2015. In this round no professional clubs could play against each other, therefore every team from 2015–16 Nemzeti Bajnokság I and 2015–16 Nemzeti Bajnokság II played with lower ranked teams. Originally 116 teams could compete, but five teams withdrew, therefore Inter CDF, Somos, Andráshida SC, Géderlaki KSE and Balatonfüred are bye to next round.

=== Matches ===
| 5 August 2015 | Nagyecsed (IV) | 4–3 | REAC (III) | Nagyecsed |
| 17:00 (CEST) | Ladányi 4'; Ascsillán 9'; Ádámszki 23', 43' | Report | Csiszár 2', 45+1'; Kiss 65' | Stadium: Rákóczi SE Nagyecsed Sporttelep; Referee: Tamás Nazsa |

| 5 August 2015 | Tiszakanyár (IV) | 1–1 (a.e.t.) (5–4 p) | Nyírbátor (III) | Tiszakanyár |
| 17:00 (CEST) | Péter Kiss 35' | Report | Tibor Soós 25' | Stadium: Tiszakanyár SE Sporttelep; Referee: Róbert Nagy |

| 5 August 2015 | Babócsa (IV) | 0–2 | Mátészalka (IV) | Babócsa |
| 17:00 (CEST) | | Report | M Petrohai 10'; Szántó 66' | Stadium: Babócsa SE Sporttelep; Referee: Norbert Kiss |

| 9 August 2015 | Vép (IV) | 2–0 | Nagyréde (IV) | Vép |
| 17:00 (CEST) | Versegi 17', 45+3' | Report | | Stadium: Vép VSE Sporttelep; Referee: Szabolcs Szilasi |

| 11 August 2015 | Baja (IV) | 0–5 | Zalaegerszeg (II) | Baja |
| 17:00 (CEST) | | Report | Szőllősi 42'; R Horváth 64'; Szakály 73'; Daru 78'; P Horváth 84' | Stadium: Bajai LSE Sporttelep; Referee: Péter Zierkelbach |

| 12 August 2015 | Csepel (III) | 0–1 | Békéscsaba (I) | Budapest (Csepel) |
| 17:00 (CEST) | | Report | Szilágyi 75' | Stadium: Csepel SC Stadion; Referee: Ádám Radványi |

| 12 August 2015 | Csorna (III) | 0–2 | Diósgyőr (I) | Csorna |
| 17:00 (CEST) | | Report | Koman 16'; Bognár 48' | Stadium: Kocsis István Városi Sporttelep; Referee: Zoltán Kovács J. |

| 12 August 2015 | Maglód (IV) | 1–6 | Paks (I) | Maglód |
| 17:00 (CEST) | Rajz 71' | Report | Kiss 14', 16'; Bor 26'; Frőhlich 36', 67'; Báló 38' | Stadium: Maglódi TC Sporttelep; Referee: Márió Görög |

| 12 August 2015 | Sárrétudvari (IV) | 0–5 | Puskás Akadémia (I) | Püspökladány^{1} |
| 17:00 (CEST) | | Report | Balogh 3' (o.g.); Lencse 19'; Tischler 53'; Péter 81', 90+2' | Stadium: Püspökladányi LE Sporttelep; Referee: Róbert Nagy |

| 12 August 2015 | Vértessomló (IV) | 1–14 | Újpest (I) | Vértessomló |
| 17:00 (CEST) | Igó 84' | Report | Bardhi 5', 18', 20', 68'; Sallói 6', 25', 30', 55'; Balogh 14'; Tóth 15'; Cseke 40'; Suljić 75', 86', 90' | Stadium: Vértessomló KSK Sportpálya; Referee: Renáta Németh |

| 12 August 2015 | Hidasnémeti (V) | 0–12 | Vasas (I) | Hidasnémeti |
| 17:00 (CEST) | | Report | Kenesei 7', 48', 69'; Czvitkovics 9', 59', 84'; Lázok 37'; Gál 42'; Remili 46', 62', 87'; Berecz 76' | Stadium: Hidasnémeti Sport Centrum; Referee: Csaba Sándor |

| 12 August 2015 | Bölcske (III) | 2–4 | Balmazújváros (II) | Bölcske |
| 17:00 (CEST) | Nagy 63'; Budai 88' | Report | Vachtler 9'; Sigér 22'; Vajda 71'; Hadházi 77' | Stadium: Bölcskei SE Sporttelep; Referee: Béla Botló |

| 12 August 2015 | Dabas (III) | 0–3 | Vác (II) | Dabas |
| 17:00 (CEST) | | Report | Frank 41'; Pölöskei 43'; Obot 79' | Stadium: FC Dabas Sporttelep; Referee: Balázs Berke |

| 12 August 2015 | Jászberény (III) | 0–2 | Ajka (II) | Jászberény |
| 17:00 (CEST) | | Report | Bölcsföldi 3'; Lattenstein 90+2' | Stadium: Jászberényi SE Sporttelep; Referee: Gergely Szőts |

| 12 August 2015 | Komló (III) | 3–2 | Szigetszentmiklós (II) | Komló |
| 17:00 (CEST) | Szabó 32'; Bata 63', 78' | Report | Vólent 74', 90+4' | Stadium: Komlói Bányász SK Sporttelep; Referee: Gábor Barna |

| 12 August 2015 | Kozármisleny (III) | 4–2 (a.e.t.) | Siófok (II) | Kozármisleny |
| 17:00 (CEST) | M Nagy 6'; Wittrédi 42', 114'; Lantos 94' | Report | Elek 52'; Kozma 81' | Stadium: Kozármisleny SE Sporttelep; Referee: József Berger |

| 12 August 2015 | Monor (III) | 1–3 | Szeged (II) | Monor |
| 17:00 (CEST) | Miholics 40' | Report | Andorka 8', 62', 79' | Stadium: Monori SE Sporttelep; Referee: Gábor Kovács |

| 12 August 2015 | Tatabánya (III) | 0–2 | Sopron (II) | Tatabánya |
| 17:00 (CEST) | | Report | Zamostny 24', 45' | Stadium: Vértesi Erőmű SE Sporttelep; Referee: János Takács |

| 12 August 2015 | Cered (IV) | 0–4 | Csákvár (II) | Cered |
| 17:00 (CEST) | | Report | Molnár 31', 40', 72'; Oldal 53' | Stadium: Ceredvölgye Apoka Sporttelep; Referee: Árpád Jakab |

| 12 August 2015 | Füzesgyarmat (IV) | 1–4 | Budaörs (II) | Füzesgyarmat |
| 17:00 (CEST) | Bajnók 9' | Report | Csillag 46', 63'; Varga 65'; Mi Sajbán 84' | Stadium: Füzesgyarmati SK Sporttelep; Referee: Sándor Szilágyi |

| 12 August 2015 | Gyöngyös (IV) | 1–0 (a.e.t.) | Dunaújváros (II) | Gyöngyös |
| 17:00 (CEST) | Nádudvari 106' | Report | | Stadium: Kömlei Károly Sporttelep; Referee: Tamás Berényi |

| 12 August 2015 | Hévíz (IV) | 0–1 | Szolnok (II) | Hévíz |
| 17:00 (CEST) | | Report | Tóth 20' | Stadium: Hévíz SK Sporttelep; Referee: István Mód |

| 12 August 2015 | Nagykáta (IV) | 0–12 | Kisvárda (II) | Nagykáta |
| 17:00 (CEST) | | Report | Rajczi 3', 8', 23'; Hegedüs 20'; Nagy 22'; Kulcsár 29', 76'; Eszlátyi 40', 46'; Csilus 80', 85'; Rézinger 89' | Stadium: Nagykáta Városi Sporttelep; Referee: Gergő Bogár |

| 12 August 2015 | Sárisáp (IV) | 0–7 | Soroksár (II) | Sárisáp |
| 17:00 (CEST) | | Report | Pál 4'; Szenes 15'; Huszák 17'; Kapacina 21'; Kákonyi 39', 75'; Koós 84' | Stadium: Sárisápi Bányász SE Sporttelep; Referee: Géza Jakab |

| 12 August 2015 | Tököl (IV) | 1–2 | Gyirmót (II) | Tököl |
| 17:00 (CEST) | Terbócs 18' | Report | Tóth 4', 61' | Stadium: Tököl VSK Sporttelep; Referee: Ádám Leél-Őssy |

| 12 August 2015 | Veresegyház (IV) | 0–2 | Mezőkövesd (II) | Veresegyház |
| 17:00 (CEST) | | Report | Bajzát 3'; Harsányi 53' | Stadium: Veresegyház VSK Sporttelep; Referee: Tibor Horváth |

| 12 August 2015 | BKV Előre (III) | 3–1 | Kazincbarcika (III) | Budapest (Józsefváros) |
| 17:00 (CEST) | Fézler 59', 90+2'; Birtalan 86' | Report | Lakatos 41' | Stadium: BKV Előre SC Sporttelep; Referee: Attila Molnár |

| 12 August 2015 | Cigánd (III) | 3–1 | Szentlőrinc (III) | Cigánd |
| 17:00 (CEST) | Z Varga 15'; Popescu 18'; Barcsay 45+1' | Report | M Tóth 41' | Stadium: Cigándi SE Sporttelep; Referee: Tamás Takács |

| 12 August 2015 | Érd (III) | 0–2 | Tállya (III) | Érd |
| 17:00 (CEST) | | Report | Benc Horváth 21'; Cs Mihálszki 61' | Stadium: Érdi VSE Sporttelep; Referee: Balázs Böcskei |

| 12 August 2015 | Felsőtárkány (III) | 2–3 (a.e.t.) | Dorog (III) | Felsőtárkány |
| 17:00 (CEST) | Molnár 78'; Babos 90+3' | Report | Berkó 55'; Vígh 73', 120' | Stadium: Felsőtárkány SC Sporttelep; Referee: László Sipos |

| 12 August 2015 | Hódmezővásárhely (III) | 1–2 | Gyula (III) | Hódmezővásárhely |
| 17:00 (CEST) | N Bartyik 17' | Report | Bálint 19'; Hegedűs 41' | Stadium: Hódmezővásárhelyi FC Sporttelep; Referee: Bálint Dolnegó |

| 12 August 2015 | Tiszaújváros (III) | 4–1 | ESMTK (III) | Tiszaújváros |
| 17:00 (CEST) | Angyal 53'; Katona 59', 63', 78' | Report | Hussein 47' (o.g.) | Stadium: FC Tiszaújváros Sporttelep; Referee: Ferenc Karakó |

| 12 August 2015 | Bácsalmás (IV) | 5–1 | Mosonmagyaróvár (III) | Bácsalmás |
| 17:00 (CEST) | Ivkovic 3'; Harnos 32', 51'; Gáspár 67'; Szávuj 77' | Report | Bezdi 25' | Stadium: Bácsalmás Városi Sporttelep; Referee: Miklós Tuczai |

| 12 August 2015 | Biatorbágy (IV) | 2–2 (a.e.t.) (4–5 p) | III. ker. TVE (III) | Biatorbágy |
| 17:00 (CEST) | Szép 49'; Kerkovits 64' | Report | Bartha 22'; Pálfalvi 50' | Stadium: Viadukt SE Biatorbágy Sporttelep; Referee: Katalin Sipos |

| 12 August 2015 | Bonyhád (IV) | 3–2 (a.e.t.) | Hatvan (III) | Bonyhád |
| 17:00 (CEST) | Fekete 5'; Pap 98'; Pfaff 117' | Report | Kész 86'; R Szabó 102' | Stadium: Bonyhád Völgység LC Sporttelep; Referee: Péter Antal |

| 12 August 2015 | DAC (IV) | 0–5 | Szekszárd (III) | Győr |
| 17:00 (CEST) | | Report | Szabolcska 2', 10', 43'; Lerch 68'; Királyházi 85' | Stadium: Győri DAC 1912 SE Sporttelep; Referee: Mátyás Farkas |

| 12 August 2015 | Hajdúböszörmény (IV) | 1–0 | SZEOL (III) | Hajdúböszörmény |
| 17:00 (CEST) | Molnár 1' | Report | | Stadium: Hajdúböszörményi TE Sporttelep; Referee: Gábor Kátai |

| 12 August 2015 | Hajdúszoboszló (IV) | 1–4 | Rákosmente (III) | Hajdúszoboszló |
| 17:00 (CEST) | Kálmán 71' | Report | Molnár 45+2'; Turcsik 51', 66'; Király 80' | Stadium: Hajdúszoboszlói SE Sporttelep; Referee: Bence Csonka |

| 12 August 2015 | Lenti (IV) | 0–2 | Pénzügyőr (III) | Lenti |
| 17:00 (CEST) | | Report | Gyürki 74'; Buzás 86' | Stadium: Lenti TE Sporttelep; Referee: Ákos Gaál |

| 12 August 2015 | Nagyatád (IV) | 0–8 | Cegléd (III) | Nagyatád |
| 17:00 (CEST) | | Report | Laczkó 36', 65', 81', 87', 90+2'; Csordás 43', 58', 64' | Stadium: Nagyatádi FC Sporttelep; Referee: Ádám Molnár |

| 12 August 2015 | Salgótarján (IV) | 1–4 | Diósd (III) | Salgótarján |
| 17:00 (CEST) | Nagy 82' | Report | Kokenszky 26', 67'; Dunai 32', 45+1' | Stadium: Salgótarjáni Tóstrandi Sporttelep; Referee: József Ducsai |

| 12 August 2015 | Siklós (IV) | 4–3 | Sárvár (III) | Siklós |
| 17:00 (CEST) | Péter 29'; Horváth 59'; Szívós 67'; Welchner 86' | Report | Kocsis 18'; Rajos 39'; Csire 76' | Stadium: Siklósi FC Sporttelep; Referee: Attila Szommer |

| 12 August 2015 | Dudar (V) | 0–2 | Újbuda (III) | Zirc^{2} |
| 17:00 (CEST) | | Report | Kovács 82', 86' | Stadium: Zirci SE Sporttelep; Referee: Tamás Sipos |

| 12 August 2015 | Somogyvár (V) | 2–6 | Dunaharaszti (III) | Somogyvár |
| 17:00 (CEST) | Fazekas 14', 32' | Report | Kiss 5'; Mészáros 6', 59'; Szmola 17', 25'; Dabasi 75' | Stadium: Somogyvár KÖSE Sporttelep; Referee: Péter Zierkelbach |

| 12 August 2015 | Ásotthalom (IV) | 4–0 | Szerencs (IV) | Ásotthalom |
| 17:00 (CEST) | Pálfi 32'; Baji 45'; Vastag 64'; Kothencz 81' | Report | | Stadium: Ásotthalmi TE Sporttelep; Referee: Attila Bálint |

| 12 August 2015 | Balatonalmádi (IV) | 0–5 | Velence (IV) | Balatonalmádi |
| 17:00 (CEST) | | Report | Varga 13'; Schäffer 61'; P Király 73'; J Király 76'; Bognár 90' | Stadium: Balatonalmádi SE Sporttelep; Referee: Bálint Juhász |

| 12 August 2015 | Celldömölk (IV) | 2–1 | Iváncsa (IV) | Celldömölk |
| 17:00 (CEST) | Győrvári 13'; Ma Enyingi 59' | Report | Nagy 48' | Stadium: Celldömölki VVSE Sporttelep; Referee: Dávid Ákos |

| 12 August 2015 | Mezőhegyes (IV) | 3–2 | Szajol (IV) | Mezőhegyes |
| 17:00 (CEST) | Ács 34', 81'; Mátó 45' | Report | Donkó 64'; T Szabó 73' | Stadium: Mezőhegyesi Városi Sporttelep; Referee: Norbert Nagy |

| 12 August 2015 | Győr (III) | 0–2 | Honvéd (I) | Győr |
| 18:00 (CEST) | | Report | Lovrić 27'; Ihrig-Farkas 53' | Stadium: ETO Park; Referee: Szabolcs Szilasi |

| 12 August 2015 | Nyúl (IV) | 1–3 | Haladás (I) | Nyúl |
| 18:00 (CEST) | Rigó 67' | Report | Popin 29', 37'; Ugrai 87' | Stadium: Nyúl SC Sporttelep; Referee: Miklós Bereczki |

| 13 August 2015 | Nyíregyháza (III) | 2–0 (a.e.t.) | Putnok (III) | Nyíregyháza |
| 20:00 (CEST) | Rezes 108'; Kostić 116' | Report | | Stadium: Városi Stadion; Referee: Tamás Nazsa |

Notes

- Note 2: Dudar played their match at Zirci SE Sporttelep in Zirc.

== Round of 64 ==
Matches were played on 22 and 23 September 2015. It involved 51 winners from the first round and five teams which were bye in the first round (Inter CDF, Somos, Andráshida SC, Géderlaki KSE and Balatonfüred).

=== Draw ===
The draw for the second round was held on 25 August 2015. In this round clubs from 2015–16 Nemzeti Bajnokság I cannot play against each other, therefore every team from NBI will play with lower ranked teams.

=== Matches ===
| 22 September 2015 | Kozármisleny (III) | 2–0 | Puskás Akadémia (I) | Kozármisleny |
| 15:00 (CEST) | Nagy 66'; Kocsis 90' | Report | | Stadium: Kozármisleny SE Sporttelep |

| 22 September 2015 | Szolnok (II) | 1–2 | Vasas (I) | Szolnok |
| 18:00 (CEST) | Gajdos 26' | Report | Czvitkovics 34'; Papucsek 53' (o.g.) | Stadium: Tiszaligeti Stadion |

| 23 September 2015 | Balatonfüred (III) | 0–7 | Diósgyőr (I) | Balatonfüred |
| 15:00 (CEST) | | Report | Grumić 15', 17', 42'; Bacsa 38'; Bognár 59', 90'; Kovács 71' | Stadium: Balatonfüredi FC Sporttelep |

| 23 September 2015 | Pénzügyőr (III) | 1–3 | Haladás (I) | Budapest (Pasarét) |
| 15:00 (CEST) | Luczek 51' | Report | Iszlai 40'; Gaál 57'; Szőke 90+2' | Stadium: Pénzügyőr SE Sporttelep |

| 23 September 2015 | Bonyhád (IV) | 0–2 | Honvéd (I) | Bonyhád |
| 15:00 (CEST) | | Report | Délczeg 53'; Prosser 72' | Stadium: Bonyhád Völgység LC Sporttelep |

| 23 September 2015 | Celldömölk (IV) | 0–9 | Újpest (I) | Celldömölk |
| 15:00 (CEST) | | Report | Kabát 12', 24', 42', 85'; Cseke 15'; Nagy 30', 75'; Balázs 81'; Bardhi 88' | Stadium: Celldömölki VVSE Sporttelep |

| 23 September 2015 | Gyöngyös (IV) | 0–2 (a.e.t.) | Paks (I) | Gyöngyös |
| 15:00 (CEST) | | Report | Bor 113'; Nagy 116' | Stadium: Kömlei Károly Sporttelep |

| 23 September 2015 | III. ker. TVE (III) | 2–0 | Budaörs (II) | Budapest (Óbuda) |
| 15:00 (CEST) | Szilágyi 81'; Kaszai 85' | Report | | Stadium: Hévízi úti Stadion |

| 23 September 2015 | BKV Előre (III) | 0–3 | Sopron (II) | Budapest (Józsefváros) |
| 15:00 (CEST) | | Report | Zamostny 36', 49' | Stadium: BKV Előre SC Sporttelep |

| 23 September 2015 | Cegléd (III) | 1–3 | Kisvárda (II) | Cegléd |
| 15:00 (CEST) | Csordás 76' | Report | Koszta 24', 41'; Farkas 28' (o.g.) | Stadium: CVSE Malomtószél Sporttelep |

| 23 September 2015 | Cigánd (III) | 2–4 | Soroksár (II) | Cigánd |
| 15:00 (CEST) | Popescu 25'; Kovács 33' | Report | Kapacina 19'; Huszák 50'; Pandur 88'; Gárdos 90+2' | Stadium: Cigándi SE Sporttelep |

| 23 September 2015 | Dorog (III) | 1–1 (a.e.t.) (5–4 p) | Gyirmót (II) | Dorog |
| 15:00 (CEST) | Nagy 77' | Report | Simon 68' | Stadium: Buzánszky Jenő Stadion |
| | Penalties |
| | Perović (penalty scored); Mészáros (penalty scored); Nagy (penalty scored); Nagyházi (penalty scored); Berkó (penalty scored) | | Paku (penalty scored); Simon (penalty scored); Kiss (penalty scored); Madarász (penalty scored); Völgyi (penalty missed) |

| 23 September 2015 | Gyula (III) | 1–2 (a.e.t.) | Szeged (II) | Gyula |
| 15:00 (CEST) | Styecz 19' | Report | B. Kovács 61'; Oláh 95' | Stadium: Gyulai Termál FC Sporttelep |

| 23 September 2015 | Nyíregyháza (III) | 4–0 | Vác (II) | Nyíregyháza |
| 15:00 (CEST) | Abdouraman 20', 23'; Szokol 26'; Rezes 42' | Report | | Stadium: Városi Stadion |

| 23 September 2015 | Rákosmente (III) | 2–3 | Ajka (II) | Budapest (Rákoscsaba) |
| 15:00 (CEST) | Nehéz 21'; Király 50' | Report | Besztercei 8', 82', 87' | Stadium: Rákosmenti Rojik FC Sporttelep |

| 23 September 2015 | Tállya (III) | 0–3 | Csákvár (II) | Tállya |
| 15:00 (CEST) | | Report | Kocsis 57', 77', 79' | Stadium: Tállya KSE Sporttelep |

| 23 September 2015 | Bácsalmás (IV) | 3–5 | Zalaegerszeg (II) | Bácsalmás |
| 15:00 (CEST) | Balázs 38'; Szávuj 79', 85' | Report | Bailo 23'; Patvaros 27'; Bíró 33', 56'; Szalkai 55' | Stadium: Bácsalmás Városi Sporttelep |

| 23 September 2015 | Mátészalka (IV) | 0–5 | Balmazújváros (II) | Mátészalka |
| 15:00 (CEST) | | Report | Fekete 23'; Viscsák 44', 79'; Belényesi 71'; Pintér 84' | Stadium: Mátészalkai MTK Sporttelep |

| 23 September 2015 | Andráshida (III) | 4–2 (a.e.t.) | Diósd (III) | Zalaegerszeg |
| 15:00 (CEST) | Tóth 37', 107'; Polareczki 86'; Mavolo 105' | Report | Sipos 50'; Ferencz 69' | Stadium: Andráshidai Sportcentrum |

| 23 September 2015 | Szekszárd (III) | 0–3 | Dunaharaszti (III) | Szekszárd |
| 15:00 (CEST) | | Report | Mészáros 10'; Ablonczy 84', 90' | Stadium: Szekszárdi UFC Sporttelep |

| 23 September 2015 | Tiszaújváros (III) | 2–1 | Komló (III) | Tiszaújváros |
| 15:00 (CEST) | Angyal 16'; Bussy 57' | Report | Horváth 18' | Stadium: FC Tiszaújváros Sporttelep |

| 23 September 2015 | Újbuda (III) | 0–1 | Somos (III) | Budapest (Budafok) |
| 15:00 (CEST) | | Report | Híves 76' | Stadium: Budafoki MTE Sporttelep |

| 23 September 2015 | Ásotthalom (IV) | 1–2 | Nagyecsed (IV) | Ásotthalom |
| 15:00 (CEST) | Baji 45' | Report | Ladányi 10'; Ádámszki 51' | Stadium: Ásotthalmi TE Sporttelep |

| 23 September 2015 | Inter CDF (IV) | 5–1 | Hajdúböszörmény (IV) | Budapest (Ferencváros) |
| 15:00 (CEST) | Lunzitisa 31', 83'; Kerekov 60'; Odia 66'; Azeez 87' | Report | Tóth 38' | Stadium: Siketek SC Sporttelep |

| 23 September 2015 | Siklós (IV) | 1–4 (a.e.t.) | Velence (IV) | Siklós |
| 15:00 (CEST) | Sztojka 21' | Report | J. Király 3', 100'; P. Király 111'; Kanyó 115' | Stadium: Siklósi FC Sporttelep |

| 23 September 2015 | Vép (IV) | 0–2 | Mezőhegyes (IV) | Vép |
| 15:00 (CEST) | | Report | Nagy 62'; Ács 85' | Stadium: Vép VSE Sporttelep |

| 23 September 2015 | Géderlak (VI) | 2–1 | Tiszakanyár (IV) | Géderlak |
| 15:00 (CEST) | Vince 45+1'; Kovács 60' | Report | Mátrai 49' | Stadium: Géderlaki Községi SE Sporttelep |

| 23 September 2015 | Mezőkövesd (II) | 0–2 (a.e.t.) | Békéscsaba (I) | Mezőkövesd |
| 17:00 (CEST) | | Report | Kertész 96'; Birtalan 99' | Stadium: Városi Stadion |

== Round of 32 ==
Matches were played on 13 and 14 October 2015. It involved 28 winners from the second round and four teams which were involved in 2015–16 UEFA Champions League (Videoton) and 2015–16 UEFA Europa League (Ferencváros, MTK and Debrecen).

=== Draw ===
The draw for the third round was held on 25 September 2015.

=== Matches ===
| 13 October 2015 | Balmazújváros (II) | 2–3 | Sopron (II) | Balmazújváros |
| 14:00 (CEST) | Fekete 64'; Papp 79' | Report | Szalai 8'; Zamostny 48'; Grabant 76' | Stadium: Balmazújvárosi FC Sporttelep; Referee: Balázs Berke |

| 13 October 2015 | Dunaharaszti (III) | 0–1 | Zalaegerszeg (II) | Dunaharaszti |
| 14:00 (CEST) | | Report | Szalkai 53' | Stadium: Dunaharaszti MTK Sporttelep; Referee: Zoltán Kovács J. |

| 14 October 2015 | Kisvárda (II) | 1–2 | Békéscsaba (I) | Kisvárda |
| 14:00 (CEST) | Koszta 90+3' | Report | Koroudijev 30'; Laczkó 78' | Stadium: Várda SE Sporttelep; Referee: Viktor Kassai |

| 14 October 2015 | Nagyecsed (IV) | 0–10 | Ferencváros (I) | Nagyecsed |
| 14:00 (CEST) | | Report | Nagy 1'; Haris 5', 40'; Busai 17', 28', 81', 87'; Lamah 19'; Varga 43'; Lakatos 46' | Stadium: Rákóczi SE Nagyecsed Sporttelep; Referee: László Lovas |

| 14 October 2015 | Géderlak (VI) | 0–3 | Debrecen (I) | Géderlak |
| 14:00 (CEST) | | Report | Sós 21', 61'; Castillion 86' | Stadium: Géderlaki Községi SE Sporttelep; Referee: Béla Botló |

| 14 October 2015 | Somos (III) | 1–3 | Haladás (I) | Salgótarján |
| 14:00 (CEST) | Novák 89' | Report | Gaál 2'; Fehér 68'; Nagy 85' | Stadium: Szojka Ferenc Stadion; Referee: Ferenc Karakó |

| 14 October 2015 | Soroksár (II) | 3–5 (a.e.t.) | Honvéd (I) | Budapest (Soroksár) |
| 14:00 (CEST) | Gárdos 10'; Hidi 20' (o.g.); Huszák 43' | Report | Holender 14'; Hidi 34'; Vasiljević 63'; Youla 104'; Baráth 118' | Stadium: Soroksári TE Sporttelep (Haraszti út); Referee: Szabolcs Szilasi |

| 14 October 2015 | Mezőhegyes (IV) | 0–6 | MTK (I) | Mezőhegyes |
| 14:00 (CEST) | | Report | Ramos 19'; Střeštík 45+1', 48', 78'; Thian 57'; Gera 73' | Stadium: Mezőhegyesi Városi Sporttelep; Referee: Tamás Nazsa |

| 14 October 2015 | Tiszaújváros (III) | 4–3 | Paks (I) | Tiszaújváros |
| 14:00 (CEST) | Bussy 7', 58'; Kovács 17'; Katona 79' | Report | Frőhlich 21'; Bor 22'; Balázs 86' | Stadium: FC Tiszaújváros Sporttelep; Referee: Gergely Szőts |

| 14 October 2015 | Velence (IV) | 1–2 | Újpest (I) | Velence |
| 14:00 (CEST) | Király 30' | Report | Kabát 47', 49' | Stadium: Velence SE Sporttelep; Referee: Tibor Gyarmati II |

| 14 October 2015 | Andráshida (III) | 0–2 | Videoton (I) | Zalaegerszeg |
| 14:00 (CEST) | | Report | dos Santos 14'; Soumah 79' | Stadium: Andráshidai Sportcentrum; Referee: Gergely Kovács |

| 14 October 2015 | Dorog (III) | 1–3 | Csákvár (II) | Dorog |
| 14:00 (CEST) | Nagy 52' | Report | Erős 14'; Mihály 77'; Oldal 81' | Stadium: Buzánszky Jenő Stadion; Referee: Ádám Radványi |

| 14 October 2015 | Inter CDF (IV) | 2–1 | III. ker. TVE (III) | Budapest (Ferencváros) |
| 14:00 (CEST) | Azeez 25'; Igwilo 45' | Report | Horváth 20' | Stadium: Siketek SC Sporttelep; Referee: Balázs Böcskei |

| 14 October 2015 | Kozármisleny (III) | 1–0 | Diósgyőr (I) | Kozármisleny |
| 15:15 (CEST) | Beke 48' | Report | | Stadium: Kozármisleny SE Sporttelep; Referee: Attila Molnár |

| 14 October 2015 | Szeged (II) | 1–0 | Ajka (II) | Gyula |
| 15:15 (CEST) | B. Kovács 90+1' | Report | | Stadium: Grosics Akadémia Sporttelep; Referee: János Takács |

| 14 October 2015 | Nyíregyháza (III) | 1–1 (a.e.t.) (5–3 p) | Vasas (I) | Nyíregyháza |
| 18:00 (CEST) | Rezes 17' | Report | Remili 56' | Stadium: Városi Stadion; Referee: Zoltán Iványi |
| | Penalties |
| | Kostić (penalty scored); Žofčák (penalty scored); Rubus (penalty scored); Kapacina (penalty scored); Törtei (penalty scored) | | Debreceni (penalty scored); Vida (penalty scored); Berecz (penalty missed); Adamović (penalty scored) |

== Round of 16 ==
Matches were played on 27 and 28 October 2015 for the first leg and 17 and 18 November 2015 for the second leg. It involved 16 winners from the third round.

=== Draw ===
The draw for the fourth round was held on 16 October 2015.

=== Matches ===
==== First leg ====
| 27 October 2015 | Békéscsaba (I) | 0–0 | MTK (I) | Békéscsaba |
| 15:15 (CET) | | Report | | Stadium: Stadion Kórház utcai Referee: János Takács |

| 28 October 2015 | Szeged (II) | 0–0 | Debrecen (I) | Gyula |
| 13:30 (CET) | | Report | | Stadium: Grosics Akadémia Sporttelep; Referee: Tibor Gyarmati II |

| 28 October 2015 | Zalaegerszeg (II) | 0–5 | Újpest (I) | Hévíz |
| 13:30 (CET) | | Report | Mohl 17'; Sallói 20', 37'; Perović 45', 50' | Stadium: Hévíz SK Sporttelep; Referee: Szabolcs Szilasi |

| 28 October 2015 | Tiszaújváros (III) | 3–0 | Inter CDF (IV) | Tiszaújváros |
| 13:30 (CET) | Katona 23', 35', 82' | Report | | Stadium: FC Tiszaújváros Sporttelep; Referee: Tamás Nazsa |

| 28 October 2015 | Nyíregyháza (III) | 4–1 | Sopron (II) | Nyíregyháza |
| 17:00 (CET) | Pölöskei 17', 30'; Rezes 25'; Szokol 63' | Report | Károly 80' | Stadium: Városi Stadion; Referee: Ádám Radványi |

| 28 October 2015 | Honvéd (I) | 1–2 | Kozármisleny (III) | Budapest (Kispest) |
| 17:00 (CET) | Youla 62' | Report | Wittrédi 51'; Kirchner 57' | Stadium: Bozsik Stadion; Referee: Róbert Nagy |

| 28 October 2015 | Haladás (I) | 0–1 | Videoton (I) | Szombathely |
| 18:00 (CET) | | Report | Kovács 54' | Stadium: Rohonci Street Stadium; Referee: Péter Solymosi |

| 28 October 2015 | Ferencváros (I) | 4–1 | Csákvár (II) | Budapest (Ferencváros) |
| 18:00 (CET) | Leandro 25'; Šesták 32'; Busai 48'; Varga 51' | Report | Cs Molnár 90+3' | Stadium: Groupama Arena; Referee: Attila Molnár |

==== Second leg ====
| 17 November 2015 | MTK (I) | 0–1 (0–1 agg.) | Békéscsaba (I) | Budapest (Angyalföld) |
| 17:30 (CET) | | Report | Damjanovic 84' | Stadium: Stadion Rudolf Illovszky; Referee: Péter Solymosi |

| 18 November 2015 | Kozármisleny (III) | 2–1 (4–2 agg.) | Honvéd (I) | Kozármisleny |
| 12:00 (CET) | Wittrédi 19'; Beke 67' | Report | Vasiljević 90' | Stadium: Kozármisleny SE Sporttelep; Referee: Csaba Pintér |

| 18 November 2015 | Sopron (II) | 0–0 (1–4 agg.) | Nyíregyháza (III) | Sopron |
| 12:00 (CET) | | Report | | Stadium: Soproni Vasutas SE Sporttelep; Referee: Szabolcs Szilsai |

| 18 November 2015 | Inter CDF (IV) | 0–1 (0–4 agg.) | Tiszaújváros (III) | Budapest (Ferencváros) |
| 12:00 (CET) | | Report | Angyal 36' | Stadium: Siketek SC Sporttelep; Referee: Zoltán Kovács J. |

| 18 November 2015 | Debrecen (I) | 3–0 (3–0 agg.) | Szeged (II) | Debrecen |
| 13:00 (CET) | Farkas 24' (o.g.); Szécsi 43'; Horváth 87' | Report | | Stadium: Nagyerdei Stadion; Referee: Ferenc Karakó |

| 18 November 2015 | Csákvár (II) | 4–3 (5–7 agg.) | Ferencváros (I) | Csákvár |
| 17:00 (CET) | Molnár 38'; Nyilasi 55'; Domján 57'; Dilaver 81' (o.g.) | Report | Böde 8'; Pintér 41'; Hajnal 54' | Stadium: Csákvári TK Sporttelep; Referee: Balázs Berke |

| 18 November 2015 | Újpest (I) | 1–1 (6–1 agg.) | Zalaegerszeg (II) | Budapest (Újpest) |
| 18:00 (CET) | Balogh 66' | Report | Szakály 80' | Stadium: Ferenc Szusza Stadium; Referee: Ádám Radványi |

| 18 November 2015 | Videoton (I) | 1–1 (2–1 agg.) | Haladás (I) | Székesfehérvár |
| 20:15 (CET) | Feczesin 58' | Report | Ugrai 61' | Stadium: Sóstói Stadion; Referee: Zsolt Szabó |

== Quarter-finals ==
The official matchday for the first leg is 17 February 2016 and for the second leg is 2 March 2016. It will involve 8 winners from the fourth round.

=== Draw ===
The draw for the fifth round was held on 27 November 2015.

=== Matches ===
==== First leg ====
| 17 February 2016 | Nyíregyháza (III) | 1–2 | Debrecen (I) | Nyíregyháza |
| (CET) | | | | Stadium: Városi Stadion |

| 17 February 2016 | Ferencváros (I) | 0–1 | Videoton (I) | Budapest (Ferencváros) |
| (CET) | | | | Stadium: Groupama Arena |

| 17 February 2016 | Békéscsaba (I) | 2–1 | Kozármisleny (III) | Békéscsaba |
| (CET) | | | | Stadium: Stadion Kórház utcai |

| 17 February 2016 | Újpest (I) | 8–1 | Tiszaújváros (III) | Budapest (Újpest) |
| (CET) | | | | Stadium: Ferenc Szusza Stadium |

==== Second leg ====
| 2 March 2016 | Debrecen (I) | 5–0 | Nyíregyháza (III) | Debrecen |
| (CET) | | | | Stadium: Nagyerdei Stadion |

| 2 March 2016 | Videoton (I) | 1–2 | Ferencváros (I) | Székesfehérvár |
| (CET) | Stopira 21' | | Böde 52'; Lamah 81' (pen.) | Stadium: Sóstói Stadion |

| 2 March 2016 | Kozármisleny (III) | 1–1 (2–3 agg.) | Békéscsaba (I) | Kozármisleny |
| (CET) | Kocsis 12' | | Punoševac 53' | Stadium: Kozármisleny SE Sporttelep |

| 2 March 2016 | Tiszaújváros (III) | 0–2 (1–10 agg.) | Újpest (I) | Tiszaújváros |
| (CET) | | | Cseke 60'; Kabát 80' | Stadium: FC Tiszaújváros Sporttelep |

== Semi-finals ==
The official matchday for the first leg is 30 March 2016 and for the second leg is 20 April 2016. It will involve 4 winners from the fifth round.

=== Matches ===
==== First leg ====
| 16 March 2016 | Újpest (I) | 2–0 | Békéscsaba (I) | Budapest (Újpest) |
| (CEST) | | | | Stadium: Ferenc Szusza Stadium |

| 16 March 2016 | Debrecen (I) | 0–0 | Ferencváros (I) | Nyíregyháza |
| (CEST) | | | | Stadium: Városi Stadion |

==== Second leg ====
| 12 April 2016 | Békéscsaba (I) | 1–1 (1–3 agg.) | Újpest (I) | Békéscsaba |
| (CEST) | | | | Stadium: Stadion Kórház utcai |

| 13 April 2016 | Ferencváros (I) | 3–0 (3–0 agg.) | Debrecen (I) | Budapest (Ferencváros) |
| (CEST) | | | | Stadium: Groupama Arena |

== Final ==
The final will be played on 7 May 2016. The match will be held at Groupama Arena, Budapest. It will involve 2 winners from the sixth round.

=== Match ===
7 May 2016
20:30 (CEST)

| Újpest (I) | 0–1 | Ferencváros (I) |
|---|---|---|
| | | Gera 79' |

Groupama Aréna, Budapest (Ferencváros)
Attendance: 19,000
Referee: Zoltán Iványi

== Top goalscorers ==
Note: Players and teams in bold are still active in the competition.

| Rank | Player | Club | Goals |
|---|---|---|---|
| 1 | (Hungary) **Bence Katona** | **Tiszaújváros** | 7 |
| 2 | (Hungary) **Péter Kabát** | **Újpest** | 6 |
| 2 | (Hungary) **Dániel Sallói** | **Újpest** | 6 |
| 4 | (Hungary) Milán Laczkó | Cegléd | 5 |
| 4 | (North Macedonia) **Enis Bardhi** | **Újpest** | 5 |
| 4 | (Hungary) Balázs Zamostny | Sopron | 5 |
| 4 | (Hungary) **Attila Busai** | **Ferencváros** | 5 |
| 8 | (Hungary) Péter Czvitkovics | Vasas | 4 |
| 8 | (Hungary) Simon Csordás | Cegléd | 4 |
| 8 | (Hungary) János Király | Velence | 4 |
| 8 | (Hungary) Csaba Molnár | Csákvár | 4 |
| 8 | (Hungary) Mohamed Remili | Vasas | 4 |
| 8 | (Hungary) László Rezes | Nyíregyháza | 4 |
| 8 | (Hungary) **Dávid Wittrédi** | **Kozármisleny** | 4 |

Updated to games played on 18 November 2015

== See also ==
- 2015–16 Nemzeti Bajnokság I
- 2015–16 Nemzeti Bajnokság II
- 2015–16 Nemzeti Bajnokság III
