= Buduburam FC =

Association football club in Ghana

- Full name: Buduburam All Stars Football Club
- Nickname(s): The Great Warriors
- Short name: BASFC-Ghana
- Founded: 2001; 24 years ago
- Chairman: Matthew Gaye
- Manager: George Pele Quansah
- Website: http://buduburamallstarghana.webmium.com/

Buduburam FC is a football club based in Buduburam, Gomoa East District, Ghana. It competed in the Ghana Division Two until the 2009–10 season.

== History ==
Created in 2001 by Liberian expatriate footballers in Ghana who wanted to have a club for local and foreign footballers. It is seen as one of the preeminent football clubs in the Gomoa East District.

== Former players ==
- (Liberia) Archie Harvey (Harnosands FF)
- (Liberia) Hassan Kanneh (Harnosands FF)
- (Liberia) Christian Essel (Zaytuna F.C.)
- (Liberia) Amos Marah (unattached)
- (Liberia) Ben Teekloh (retired)
- (Liberia) Francis Doe (Selangor FA)
- (Liberia) Aloysius Pennie (retired) Michael T. Jurry (retired)
