= Felix Baffoe =

Ghanaian football player

Personal information
- Date of birth: 25 November 1986 (age 39)
- Place of birth: Ghana
- Height: 6 ft 0 in (1.83 m)
- Position: Striker

Senior career*
Years	Team	Apps	(Gls)
2003–2008	Liberty Professionals		
2008	→ Zaytuna (loan)		
2008–2010	Accra Hearts of Oak		
2012	Energetik Dushanbe		
2013	Ravshan Kulob		
2014	Energetik Dushanbe		
2015–2016	Barkchi		

International career^{‡}
2003	Ghana	1	(0)
- * Club domestic league appearances and goals as of 8 December 2017 ‡ National team caps and goals as of 8 December 2017

Felix Baffoe (born 26 December 1991) is a Ghanaian football player.

== Career ==
Baffoe began his career with Liberty Professionals FC and joined in Mai 2008 on loan to Zaytuna F.C. In May 2008 the loan deal ended and he signed a contract with Accra Hearts of Oak.

== International ==
Baffoe holds one cap for the Black Stars.

== Career statistics ==
=== International ===
Ghana national team
Year	Apps	Goals
2003	1	0
Total	1	0

Statistics accurate as of match played 30 May 2003
