= Varmah =

Varmah is both a given name and a surname. Notable people with the name include:

- Eddington Varmah, Liberian politician
- Varmah Kpoto (born 1978), Liberian footballer
- Varmah Sonie (born 1990), American football player

== See also ==
- Varma (surname)
