= Eugene Dennis (footballer) =

Liberian footballer (born 1996)

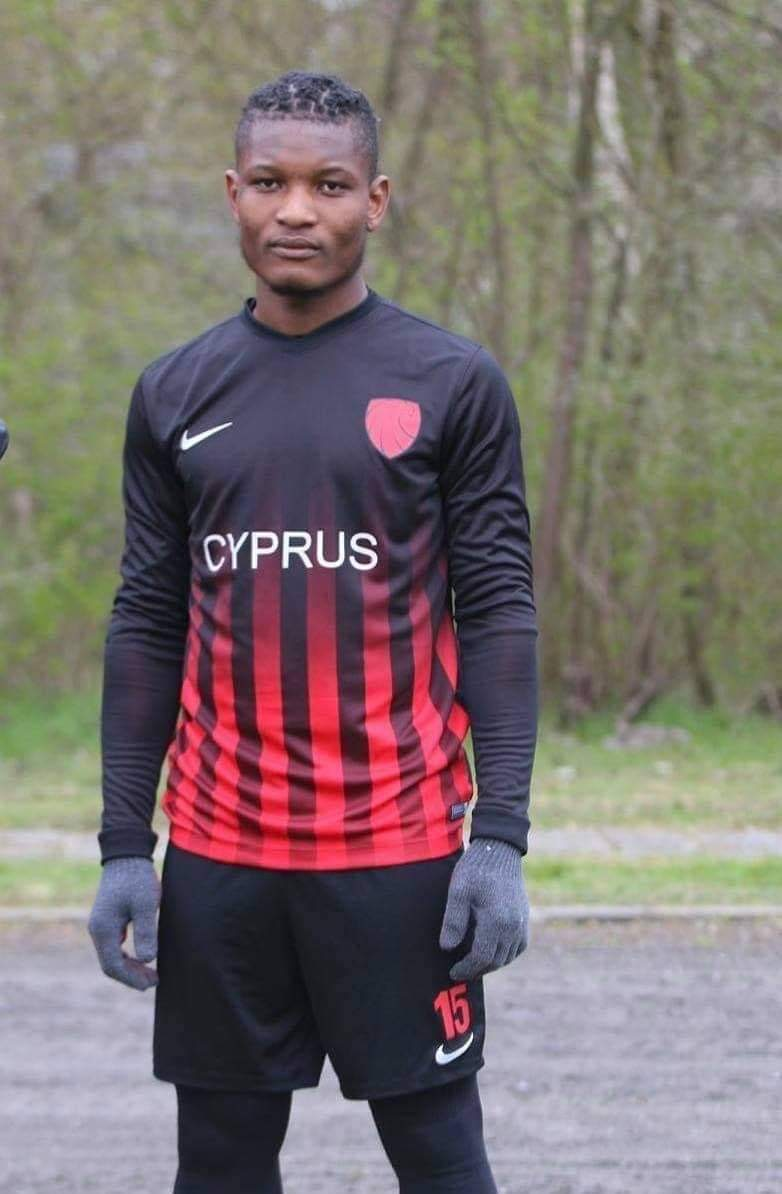
- Dennis in a Ishøj IF jersey

Personal information
- Date of birth: 16 November 1996 (age 29)
- Place of birth: Buduburam, Ghana
- Position: Center-back

Team information
- Current team: Ishøj IF

Youth career
- 2012-2013: GAC

Senior career*
Years	Team	Apps	(Gls)
2016–2017	Hershey FC	13	(2)
2017–2022	Philadelphia Lone Star FC	28	(4)
2022–	Ishøj IF	8	(0)

International career^{‡}
2022–	Liberia	3	(0)
- * Club domestic league appearances and goals as of 04:54, 12 September 2022 (UTC) ‡ National team caps and goals as of 02:20, 17 March 2022 (UTC)

Eugene Dennis (born 16 November 1996) is a Liberian professional footballer who plays as center-back for Ishøj IF and the Liberia national team.

== Personal life ==
Dennis was born in Buduburam, Ghana, to Liberian refugee parents.

== Club career ==
=== Hershey FC ===
Eugene moved to the Hershey FC in the summer 2016.

=== Philadelphia Lone Star FC ===
Eugene moved to the USL League Two club Philadelphia Lone Star FC in 2017.

=== Ishøj IF ===
On 1 February 2022, Ishøj IF announced the signing of Eugene on a one-year deal.

== International career ==
Dennis made his debut for Liberia in a friendly against Sierra Leone on 27 March 2022. He played his second international game on 29 March in a 2–1 friendly loss to Burundi.

He played again for Liberia in a 2023 AFCON Qualifier against Morocco on 13 June.
