= Hervás (surname) =

Hervás is a Spanish surname. Notable people with the surname include:

- Francisco Hervás (born in 1962), volleyballer
- Francisco Hervás (born 1981), swimmer
- Javier Hervás (born 1989), Spanish footballer
- Lorenzo Hervás y Panduro (1735–1809), Spanish Jesuit and philologist
- Manu Hervás (born 1986), Spanish footballer
