= Buduburam =

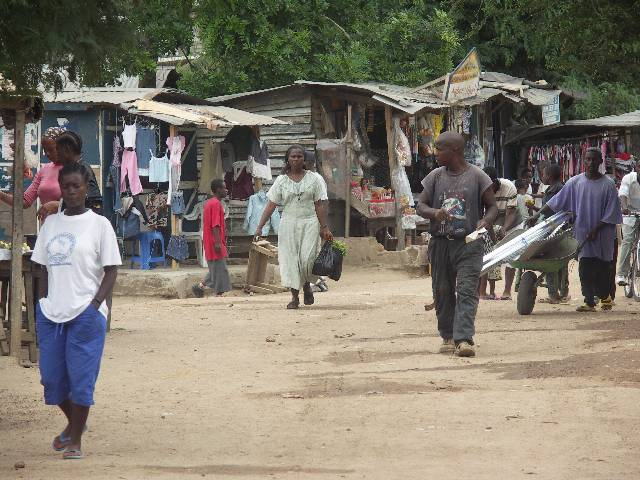
- Buduburam refugee camp, July 2005

- Location in Ghana
- Coordinates: 5°32′N 0°28′W
- Country: Ghana
- Region: Central Region
- District: Gomoa East District
- Time zone: GMT
  - Summer (DST): GMT

Buduburam is a refugee camp located 44 kilometers (27 mi) west of Accra, Ghana. It is along the Accra-Cape Coast Highway. Opened by the United Nations High Commissioner for Refugees (UNHCR) in 1990, the camp is home to more than 12,000 refugees from Liberia who fled their country during the First Liberian Civil War (1989–1996) and the Second Liberian Civil War (1999–2003). The camp is served by Liberian and international NGO groups and volunteer organizations. The Carolyn A. Miller Elementary School provides free education to nearly 500 children in the camp.

== History ==
Buduburam, located in Ghana, was established in 1990 to accommodate the influx of Liberian refugees who fled to Ghana when Charles Taylor came to power. Initially, the UNHCR provided the settlement's residents with individual aid and relief.

In 1997, Liberia held elections that the UN judged fair enough to allow for safe repatriation conditions. As a result, the UNHCR discontinued refugee assistance to Liberians in Ghana, and the settlement lost much of its funding. During this time, an estimated 3,000 refugees returned to Liberia. Most chose to remain in Ghana, and the Buduburam settlement served as the center of their community.

Soon after the 1997 elections, the political situation in Liberia worsened, and fresh arrivals of Liberian refugees to Ghana led the UNHCR to return to Buduburam. Although the UNHCR limits its personal aid efforts in the settlement to unaccompanied minors, the elderly, and the disabled, the organization does sponsor infrastructure work within the community, funding projects such as construction and education.

The UNHCR began pulling out of the camp in April 2007, slowly withdrawing all UNHCR-administered services. June 2010 was the official cessation of refugee status for the refugees in the settlement.

In February 2011, the Deputy Minister of Information in Ghana indicated that Buduburam is no longer needed and that the inhabitants should consider returning to Liberia or settling elsewhere in Ghana.

On 14 October 2024, a construction company working on the Accra-Winneba highway along the Buduburam road caused damage in a fatal accident after blasting a rock. Work was later resumed after the incident.

=== Voluntary repatriation ===
In February–March 2024, traditional rulers in Gomoa East began demolishing structures in Buduburam, displacing over 6,000 people. With camps closed and shelter destroyed, many Liberians opted to return home.

The Liberian government, through its Refugee Repatriation & Resettlement Commission (LRRRC), coordinated discussions with Ghanaian authorities and UN partners. By April 2024, they confirmed that around 1,600 camp residents wished to repatriate.

In mid-May 2024, approximately 770 refugees left Buduburam in a first wave of voluntary repatriation. They were transported by bus and support vehicles through Ghana to Liberia. The repatriation plan covered a total of about 4,300–4,300+ returnees between May and June 2024.

The first cohort arrived at Loguatuo border on 24 May. They were received by LRRRC officials and taken to a temporary reception center in Sergeant Kollie Town, Bong County. LRRRC designated facilities for drug testing, rehabilitation, and general integration.

Health assessments revealed that a significant portion of the first 750 returnees faced issues: LRRRC reported that “80 percent” struggled with drug addiction, along with cases of mental illness, pregnant women, and many children under five. LRRRC designated facilities for drug testing, rehabilitation, and general integration.

Critics, such as the Liberia Returnees Network (LRN), decried the repatriation as poorly managed and lacking inclusivity. LRN called for involvement in planning and better post-return assistance, including land, housing, job support, and psychological care.

Within Ghana, meanwhile, the refugee board and Ghanaian authorities sought to register remaining Liberians for relocation or local solutions; UNHCR encouraged voluntary return.

While Buduburam supported millions over decades, this repatriation was supported in part by international bodies. Earlier IOM-led programs received funding from the U.S. State Department to help refugees return. In 2024, the Liberian and Ghana governments collaborated under UNHCR guidelines to enable safe returns.

== In media ==
In 2008, the University of Alberta, in a collaborative initiative involving faculty, staff, and students, as well as camp musicians and a camp NGO (Center for Youth Empowerment) produced a music CD entitled Giving Voice to Hope: Music of Liberian Refugees, featuring 16 Liberian musical groups then residing as refugees in Buduburam. The CD, was meant to raising global awareness about Buduburam, conflict, and displacement in West Africa, while raising profiles of participating musicians, supporting them with royalties from CD sales, and generally encouraging music-making in the camp. Musical recordings represent life in Buduburam through multiple genres: traditional, gospel, hip hop, rap, R&B, and reggae.

== Notable residents ==
- Canadian soccer player Alphonso Davies was born in Buduburam in 2000 before moving to Edmonton, Canada at the age of five.
- A Liberian-born singer-songwriter Irene Logan, who took refuge in Ghana during the Liberian civil war. She later rose to fame in Ghana after winning Stars of the Future in 2006.
- Christian Sokapie Essel, footballer born in Monrovia, but honed his skills at Buduburam FC before playing professionally across Africa and Europe, and earning at least one cap for Liberia.
- Bishop Blay, Liberian actor who fled to Ghana during the war and first trained in “street dramas” at the camp. His breakout came in the film Out of My Hand (2015), where critics praised his natural performance.
- Kimmie Weeks, a prominent advocate for children's rights. Weeks contracted life-threatening illnesses in Buduburam after which he pledged to help vulnerable youth. He later founded Youth Action International and received Liberia’s Humane Order of African Redemption.
