= Zome Louis =

Cameroonian footballer

Louis Zome
Personal information
- Full name: Louis René Zome
- Date of birth: April 6, 1988 (age 38)
- Place of birth: Douala, Cameroon
- Height: 1.76 m (5 ft 9 1/2 in)
- Position: Striker

Team information
- Current team: Ironi Nesher
- Number: 69

Youth career
- Acefoot Academy

Senior career*
| Years | Team | Apps | (Gls) |
| 2008–2009 | Tiko United | | |
| 2009–2010 | US Douala | | |
| 2011–2012 | Hapoel Acre | 18 | (3) |
| 2013–2014 | Beitar Tel Aviv Ramla | | |
| 2014–2015 | Inter CDF | 35 | (45) |
| 2015–2016 | Gzira United FC | 18 | (10) |
| 2017– | Ironi Nesher | 0 | (0) |
- * Club domestic league appearances and goals

Louis René Zome (born 6 April 1988) is a Cameroonian footballer, currently who plays for Internationale Club De Football Budapest.

== Career ==
Zome was also the captain of his team which won the 2008/2009 football championship in Cameroon. He was the highest goalscorer in the Cameroon MTN ELIT 1 in 2007/2008 season. After three successful seasons with Tiko United, was on 08. February 2011 sold to Israeli side Hapoel Acre A.F.C. He played his last Match for Acco on 14. January 2012, before returned to Cameroon. In 2013 Louis played for Beitar Ramle Tel Aviv in the second division in Israel. He moved to Hungary and played for Internationale Club De Football of Budapest. 2014 In 2016, he moved to first division in Malta and played for Gzira United FC and finished as league champion unbeaten

== International career ==
Zome played with the Cameroon A PRIME National selection.
