= Aloysius Pennie =

Liberian footballer

Aloysius Penie
Personal information
- Full name: Aloysius Wleh Penie
- Date of birth: 17 April 1984 (age 42)
- Place of birth: Monrovia, Liberia
- Position: Defender

Team information
- Current team: LISCR FC
- Number: 3

Youth career
- LISCR

Senior career*
Years	Team	Apps	(Gls)
2003	Racing FC Bafoussam		
2004	Buduburam F.C.		
2005–2008	LISCR		

International career
2005	Liberia	3	(0)
- * Club domestic league appearances and goals

Aloysius Wleh Penie (born 17 April 1984) is a Liberian former footballer who played as a defender.

== International career ==
Pennie was a member of the Liberia national football team and earned his first cap in May 2005.
