= Monrovia FC =

Liberian football club

- Full name: Monrovia Football Club
- Founded: 2010

Monrovia Football Club is a football club based in Monrovia, Liberia. The club's prior name was FCAK-Liberia but transformed into Monrovia FC 2010. The club currently tops the table of the First Division in Liberia.

== Current squad ==
Note: Flags indicate national team as defined under FIFA eligibility rules; some limited exceptions apply. Players may hold more than one non-FIFA nationality.

No.	Pos.	Nation	Player
—	GK	LBR	Patrick Korfeh
—	GK	LBR	Wolo Weah
—	DF	LBR	Dodo Smith
—	DF	LBR	Al-Hassan Kromah
—	DF	NGA	Emile Manghe
—	DF	LBR	Hassan Kanneh
—	DF	LBR	Weah Ephraim Harris
—	DF	LBR	Mark Hodges
—	MF	LBR	Varney Foboi
—	MF	LBR	Andrew Williams
—	MF	LBR	Hilton Varney

No.	Pos.	Nation	Player
—	MF	LBR	Andrew Nagbe
—	MF	LBR	Jacob Doeyou
—	MF	LBR	Mohammed Massaqui
—	MF	LBR	Vassebe Jabateh
—	MF	LBR	Archie Harvey
—	MF	LBR	Samir Kamara
—	MF	LBR	Aloycious Glassco
—	MF	LBR	Martinno Hallie
—	FW	LBR	Varney Dukuly
—	FW	LBR	Gabriel Koiyan
—	FW	LBR	Randy Dukuly
