= FCAK-Liberia =

Liberian football club

FCAK
- Full name: Football Club Azziz Kara
- Founded: 2008
- Chairman: (Liberia) Musa Shannon
- League: Liberian Premier League

FCAK-Liberia was a football (soccer) club from Liberia. FCAK-Liberia that was founded in 2008 after they participated in the 2007 season as Mark Professionals. There also is a FCAK-South Africa who plays in the second division of the league. This team is privately owned by a South African Businessman. The club's prior name was FCAK-Liberia but transformed into Monrovia FC.

== Achievements ==
- Liberian Premier League: 0
- Liberian Cup: 0
- Liberian Super Cup: 0

== Current squad ==
Note: Flags indicate national team as defined under FIFA eligibility rules; some limited exceptions apply. Players may hold more than one non-FIFA nationality.

No.	Pos.	Nation	Player
—	DF	LBR	Varmah Kpoto (Captain)
