= Francis Doe =

Liberian footballer (born 1985)

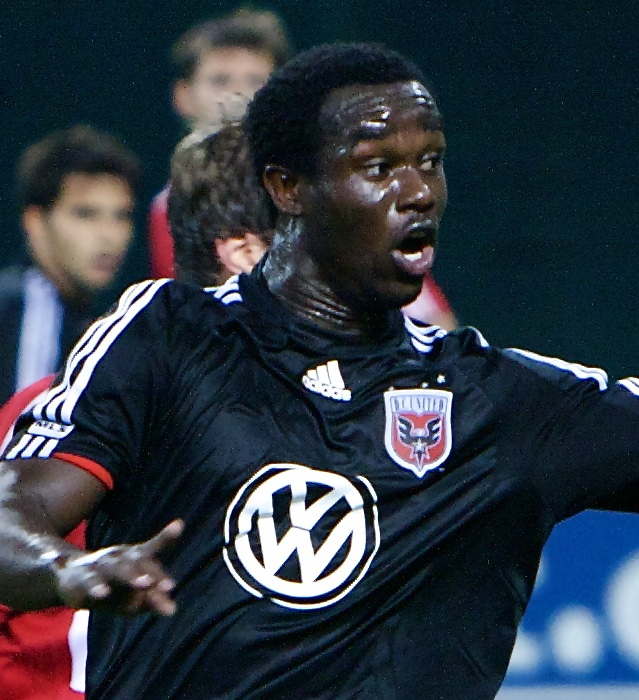
- Doe with D.C. United in 2008

Personal information
- Full name: Francis Forkey Doe
- Date of birth: 25 December 1985 (age 40)
- Place of birth: Monrovia, Liberia
- Height: 5 ft 8 in (1.73 m)
- Position: Forward

Team information
- Current team: Kelantan WTS
- Number: 99

Senior career*
Years	Team	Apps	(Gls)
2002–2003	Tonnerre Yaoundé	24	(18)
2003	Buduburam	16	(3)
2004–2005	Minnesota Thunder	4	(0)
2005–2007	Atromitos	34	(8)
2007	New York Red Bulls	8	(2)
2008–2009	D.C. United	14	(2)
2009–2011	Al Ahly	18	(4)
2012	Terengganu	20	(14)
2013	Selangor FA	26	(10)
2014	Kelantan	28	(5)
2015	NS Matrix	25	(17)
2016	Felda United	19	(15)
2017	Selangor FA	18	(8)
2018	Pahang FA	3	(5)
2020	Immigration F.C.	0	(0)
2025–	Kelantan WTS	1	(0)

International career^{‡}
2005–2016	Liberia	22	(5)
- * Club domestic league appearances and goals as of 7 October 2025 ‡ National team caps and goals as of 20 February 2017

Francis Forkey Doe (born 25 December 1985) is a Liberian footballer who plays as a forward for Malaysian side Kelantan WTS.

== Club career ==
Doe began his career in the Cameroon Première Division in 2002, playing for Tonnerre Yaoundé. Doe was voted best foreign player and third best overall player (as voted on by the Cameroon Football Federation and the Cameroon Sports Writers Association), and in doing so became the second Liberian player to win the Cameroonian First Division foreign Player of the Year award, the first being former world footballer of the year George Weah who received the award more than a decade ago. That same year Doe led the club to the CAF Cup final, netting six goals in eight CAF Cup matches.

In summer 2003, Doe moved back to Ghanaian side Buduburam. He then moved again in 2004 and signed a contract with USL First Division side Minnesota Thunder. His contract with Minnesota included an opt-out clause which Doe utilized when he started receiving interest from European clubs. Having drawn interest from many clubs including Walsall in England, as well as Boca Juniors in Argentina, Doe agreed to a two-year deal with Greek club Atromitos and was regularly transferred from Buduburam FC, with whom he tallied six goals in twenty league matches in his first season at the club.

In March 2007, Doe and Atromitos mutually agreed to end the contract between them. Doe later had a brief spell in the Major League Soccer on trial with FC Dallas, who were unable to secure his services due to league restrictions on the number of foreign players in one club. He then went on another trial with New York Red Bulls, eventually securing a contract with the club. On 22 September 2007, in his second start for the Red Bulls, Doe scored his first MLS goal and made an assist in a 2–2 draw versus the New England Revolution. Doe was a key contributor for the club after his late-season acquisition. In 8 league matches, 4 of them coming from the bench, Doe managed to record two goals and one assist and helped the club qualify for the MLS playoffs. Doe started the club's first playoff game against the New England Revolution, logging 68 minutes in a scoreless affair. He was unable to participate in the second leg due to injury. He was waived by the team on 21 February 2008.

Doe signed with D.C. United after a short trial in April 2008. Since his arrival, Doe has scored in every competition for United, including both goals in the club's 2–1 league win over the New England Revolution on 16 October 2008. Doe was waived by D.C. United on 24 April 2009, to make room on the roster for new signing Avery John.

In summer 2009, Doe was approached by African Club of the Century Al Ahly, who thought of him as an ideal replacement for their recently departed top goalscorer Flavio Amado. After only one week of negotiations, Doe decided to try his luck in a second spell in home Africa and signed to the Egyptian Premier League on 14 July 2009, on a free transfer. He has featured for Al Ahly in Wembley Cup friendly tournament, playing against Celtic FC and Barcelona FC. Doe scored his first goal with Al Ahly on His debut against Ghazl El-Mehalla on 6 August 2009 to secure Al Ahly's 2–0 win in the opening match of the season.

In January 2012, Doe officially joined the Malaysian club Terengganu FA for the 2012 Malaysia Super League season. He would finish the season joint top scorer in the league with 15 goals.

After a season with Terengganu, Doe joined another Malaysian team Selangor FA for the 2013 Malaysia Super League. Doe is one of the most powerful and sharp strikes in the Malaysia Super League, and for the 2014 season, he plays for Malaysia Super League club, Kelantan FA.

His first appearance in a competitive league saw he had scored the first goal when assisting NS Matrix F.C. 3–1 victory over DRB-Hicom F.C. at Hang Jebat Stadium, Melaka.

In August 2025, after a five-year break in his career, and at the age of 39, he signed with Malaysia A1 Semi-Pro League club Kelantan WTS.

== International career ==
Doe has represented Liberia in 2006 FIFA World Cup qualification matches, as well as the qualifying competition for the 2008 African Cup of Nations. Doe scored two goals during Liberia's 2008 ACN qualifying campaign, opening the scoring in a 3–2 victory over Rwanda on 8 October 2006, and scoring Liberia's lone goal in their 3–1 loss to Cameroon on 28 March 2007. Doe also scored against Senegal in a 3–1 loss to the Lions in 2012. In June 2012, Doe was expelled from the squad ahead of a 2013 Africa Cup of Nations qualifier.

== Personal life ==
On 5 May 2017, Doe was caught displaying a false registration number on his BMW 325i in front of restaurant Alfa Maju in Bandar Puteri Puchong. Doe could have been sentenced to six months in jail if found guilty. On 11 May, he pleaded guilty and paid a fine of rm 6000.

== Career statistics ==
Scores and results list Liberia's goal tally first.

No	Date	Venue	Opponent	Score	Result	Competition
1.	8 October 2006	Antoinette Tubman Stadium, Monrovia, Liberia	Rwanda	1–0	3–2	2008 Africa Cup of Nations qualification
2.	24 March 2007	Stade Ahmadou Ahidjo, Yaoundé, Cameroon	Cameroon	1–2	1–3	2008 Africa Cup of Nations qualification
3.	5 June 2011	Samuel Kanyon Doe Sports Complex, Monrovia, Liberia	Cape Verde	1–0	1–0	2012 Africa Cup of Nations qualification
4.	2 June 2012	Stade Léopold Sédar Senghor, Dakar, Senegal	Senegal	1–0	1–3	2014 FIFA World Cup qualification
5.	5 September 2015	Antoinette Tubman Stadium, Monrovia, Liberia	Tunisia	1–0	1–0	2017 Africa Cup of Nations qualification

== Honors ==
DC United

- US Open Cup: 2008

Al Ahly Cairo

- Egyptian Premier League: 2009–10, 2010–11
- Egyptian Super Cup: 2010–11

Individual

- Malaysia Super League top goalscorer: 2012 (15 goals)
