= Ben Teekloh =

Liberian footballer

Personal information
- Date of birth: 6 December 1983 (age 42)
- Place of birth: Monrovia, Liberia
- Height: 5 ft 10 in (1.78 m)
- Position: Defensive midfielder

Youth career
- Inter Allies

Senior career*
| Years | Team | Apps | (Gls) |
| 2000 | Inter Allies | 20 | (7) |
| 2001 | Buduburam | 27 | (16) |
| 2002–2003 | Tonnerre Yaoundé | 17 | (2) |
| 2004 | Ashanti Gold | | |
| 2004–2005 | Al-Nasr Salalah | | |
| 2005–2006 | Nistru Otaci | 11 | (0) |
| 2006 | Al-Nasr Salalah | | |
| 2007–2010 | Farul Constanța | 59 | (3) |
| 2010–2012 | Astra Ploiești | 9 | (0) |
| 2010–2012 | Astra II Giurgiu | 8 | (1) |
| Total | | 151 | (29) |

International career^{‡}
| 2004–2011 | Liberia | 14 | (0) |
- * Club domestic league appearances and goals as of 17 July 2018 ‡ National team caps and goals as of 17 July 2018

Ben Teekloh (born 6 December 1983) is a former Liberian former footballer who played as a defensive midfielder. He last played for FC Astra II Giurgiu in Romania.

== International ==
Teekloh was a member of the Liberia national football team, earning 23 caps. He participated in the 2002 African Nations Cup and the 2008 African Nations Cup qualifiers. Teekloh earned his first cap in 2001 against Ivory Coast.

On Thursday 16 August 2007, Teekloh was hospitalised after being seriously burnt in an explosion at his apartment. He missed the first half of the season and was reported to have had a miraculous escape.
