= Christian Essel =

Liberian footballer

Personal information
- Full name: Christian Sokapie Essel
- Date of birth: 12 June 1989 (age 37)
- Place of birth: Monrovia, Liberia
- Height: 1.78 m (5 ft 10 in)
- Positions: Striker; winger

Youth career
- 1996: Buduburam School

Senior career*
Years	Team	Apps	(Gls)
1997–2002	Buduburam FC	54	(23)
2003	PWD Bamenda	6	(3)
2004	Kiawu SC	5	(2)
2005	Roza FC	11	(4)
2006	Shoes FC	19	(8)
2006	Gedi & Sons	12	(1)
2007	DISM Dokpah	30	(19)
2007–2008	Zaytuna		
2009–2010	Sporting St. Mirren		
2010–2011	Invincible Eleven		
2011–2012	Radnički Kragujevac	0	(0)
2012–2014	Inter Budapest		
2014	Frånö SK	21	(7)
2015	Zaytuna		

International career
2008	Liberia	1	(0)
- * Club domestic league appearances and goals

Christian Sokapie Essel (born 6 December 1989) is a Liberian retired footballer who played as both a midfielder and striker.

== Career ==
Born in capital city of Monrovia, Essel began his career with Buduburam FC played here six years and joined than in Januar 2003 to Cameroonian club PWD Bamenda. After one year with the team joined in his native Ghana who played at Buduburam School for some clubs on the camp Kiawu SC, Roza FC, Shoes FC and then DISM. In summer 2007 was scouted from MTN Sports Academy Head Coach Ibrahim Sunday, for Zaytuna F.C. and joined than after the relegation to Sporting St. Mirren in Winter 2008/2009.

During summer 2011 he has been on trial with Serbian SuperLiga clubs FK Sloboda Point Sevojno and FK Radnički 1923. He eventually got a contract with FK Radnički 1923 but failed to make a debut in the Serbian SuperLiga.

== International ==
He represented the Liberia national football team on his debut 6 June 2008 in Blida against Algeria national football team.

== Honors ==
Invincible Eleven

- Liberian Cup: 2011
