= Dávid Pál =

Hungarian footballer

Personal information
- Full name: Dávid Pál
- Date of birth: 23 September 1993 (age 33)
- Place of birth: Nagykanizsa, Hungary
- Height: 1.86 m (6 ft 1 in)
- Position: Defender

Team information
- Current team: Ajka
- Number: 13

Youth career
- 2003–2006: Nagykanizsa FC
- 2006–2010: Zalaegerszeg

Senior career*
Years	Team	Apps	(Gls)
2010–2014	Zalaegerszeg	11	(0)
2014–2015	Vasas	2	(0)
2015–	Ajka	15	(2)

International career^{‡}
2011–2012	Hungary U-19	5	(0)
- * Club domestic league appearances and goals as of 22 January 2016 ‡ National team caps and goals as of 30 May 2012

Dávid Pál (born 23 September 1993 in Nagykanizsa) is a Hungarian striker who currently plays for FC Ajka.
