= Archie Harvey =

Liberian footballer (born 1992)

Personal information
- Full name: Archie Harvey
- Date of birth: 3 November 1992 (age 33)
- Place of birth: Monrovia, Liberia
- Height: 5 ft 4 in (1.63 m)
- Positions: Midfielder; defender

Team information
- Current team: Europa Point
- Number: 5

Youth career
- 2007–2009: Gedi & Sons FC

Senior career*
Years	Team	Apps	(Gls)
2010–2011	Mighty Barrolle	53	(19)
2012	Monrovia FC	18	(5)
2013–2014	Nordvärmlands FF	27	(3)
2015	Motala AIF	5	(0)
2016–2017	Södertälje FK	–	(–)
2017	Arameisk-Syrianska IF	11	(0)
2018–2019	Assyriska FF	21	(1)
2019	Nybergsund	26	(0)
2020–	Europa Point	7	(0)

International career
2011	Liberia	8	(0)
- * Club domestic league appearances and goals as of 10 March 2020

Archie Harvey (born November 3, 1992) is a Liberian footballer who plays as a defender or midfielder for Europa Point in the Gibraltar National League.

== Club ==
Harvey started his career with Gedi & Sons FC in the Liberian league. In 2011, he was signed by Mighty Barrolle, a club playing in the Liberian First Division.

Swedish coach Johan Sandahl then scouted the Liberian winger and brought him to his native country in 2013. He first played two seasons with Nordvärmland FF in the Swedish fourth division, before signing with Motala AIF in 2015. Harvey then signed with Södertälje FK in 2016, and moved to Arameisk-Syrianska IF in 2017.

== National team ==
Harvey played eight matches for the Liberian national team in 2011. He appeared in the West Africa Football Union (WAFU) tournament held in Nigeria. He was part of the senior team that settled 0–0 against Angola during the international fixture at SKD complex in Monrovia.
