= Vlad Bujor =

Romanian footballer

Personal information
- Full name: Vlad Alin Bujor
- Date of birth: 3 February 1989 (age 37)
- Place of birth: Satu Mare, Romania
- Height: 1.83 m (6 ft 0 in)
- Position: Forward

Team information
- Current team: Avântul Reghin
- Number: 23

Youth career
- 1997–2005: Olimpia Satu Mare
- 2005–2008: CFR Cluj

Senior career*
Years	Team	Apps	(Gls)
2008–2009	CFR Cluj	0	(0)
2009–2010	Politehnica Iaşi	33	(4)
2010	Mersin İdmanyurdu	6	(1)
2011	FC U Craiova	4	(0)
2011	Zalaegerszeg	10	(0)
2012–2013	Târgu Mureș	2	(0)
2013–2015	Olimpia Satu Mare	36	(6)
2015	Academica Clinceni	17	(6)
2016	Botoșani	5	(1)
2016–2017	Foresta Suceava	17	(4)
2017	Sepsi OSK	9	(3)
2017	Pandurii Târgu Jiu	12	(1)
2018–2021	Avântul Reghin	42	(25)
2021–2022	MSE Târgu Mureș	10	(11)
2022–	Avântul Reghin	42	(11)

International career^{‡}
2009	Romania U–21	1	(0)
- * Club domestic league appearances and goals as of 12:47, 25 December 2024 (UTC) ‡ National team caps and goals as of 16:09, 13 January 2024 (UTC)

Vlad Alin Bujor (born 3 February 1989 in Satu Mare) is a Romanian footballer who plays as a forward for Avântul Reghin. He scored his first goal against FC Universitatea Craiova, from the penalty spot, in the opening day of Liga II 2013–2014. Bujor scored his third goal for the club against Metalul Reșița, in the 13th round of Liga II.
