= Mahir Jasarević =

Hungarian footballer

Personal information
- Date of birth: 14 January 1992 (age 34)
- Place of birth: Letenye, Hungary
- Height: 1.87 m (6 ft 2 in)
- Position: Midfielder

Team information
- Current team: ASV Pöttsching

Youth career
- 2003–2006: Letenye SE
- 2006–2012: Zalaegerszegi

Senior career*
Years	Team	Apps	(Gls)
2011–2014	Zalaegerszegi	15	(1)
2011–2012	→ Zalaegerszegi II	26	(7)
2013	→ Lombard Pápa (loan)	0	(0)
2013–2014	→ Andráshida (loan)	25	(2)
2014–2015	Szigetszentmiklós	17	(0)
2015–2017	Mosonmagyaróvár	58	(10)
2017–2018	Szolnok	33	(3)
2018–2019	ATSV Ranshofen		
2019–2023	Mosonmagyaróvár	104	(9)
2023–	ASV Pöttsching		
- * Club domestic league appearances and goals as of 30 May 2023

Mahir Jasarević (born 14 January 1992) is a Hungarian striker who plays for Austrian club ASV Pöttsching.
