= Gábor Kovács (footballer, born October 1987) =

Hungarian footballer

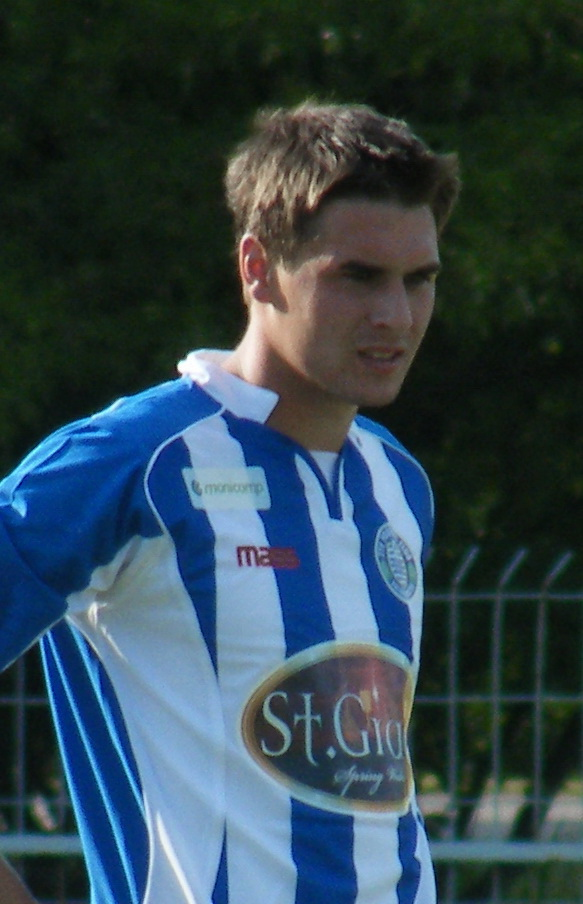

Personal information
- Full name: Gábor Kovács
- Date of birth: 23 October 1987 (age 39)
- Place of birth: Ajka, Hungary
- Height: 1.87 m (6 ft 2 in)
- Positions: Forward; striker

Team information
- Current team: Zalaegerszegi TE
- Number: 24

Senior career*
Years	Team	Apps	(Gls)
2006–2011	FC Ajka	57	(6)
2011	Balatonfüredi FC	14	(10)
2011–	Zalaegerszegi TE	11	(0)
- * Club domestic league appearances and goals as of 27 May 2012

Gábor Kovács (born 23 October 1987 in Ajka) is a Hungarian striker who currently plays for Zalaegerszegi TE.
