= Géderlak =

- Interactive map of Géderlak
- Coordinates: 46°37′N 18°55′E
- Country: Hungary
- County: Bács-Kiskun

Area
  - Total: 18.72 km^{2} (7.23 sq mi)

Population (2015)
  - Total: 997
  - Density: 53.2/km^{2} (138/sq mi)
- Time zone: UTC+1 (CET)
  - Summer (DST): UTC+2 (CEST)
- Postal code: 6334
- Area code: 78

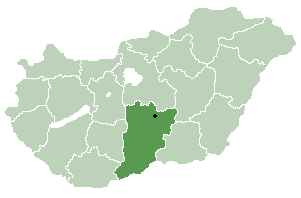
Location of Bács-Kiskun county in Hungary

Géderlak (Croatian: Gider) is a village in Bács-Kiskun county, in the Southern Great Plain region of southern Hungary.

== Geography ==
It covers an area of 27.93 km^{2} (11 sq mi) and has a population of 997 people (2015).
