= Varmah Kpoto =

Liberian footballer

Personal information
- Date of birth: 28 January 1978 (age 48)
- Place of birth: Monrovia, Liberia
- Position: Defender

Senior career*
Years	Team	Apps	(Gls)
1996–1997	Junior Professional		
1998–1999	Saint Anthony		
1999–2000	Olympiacos Volos	10	(0)
2001–2002	Apollon Kryas Vrysi	28	(1)
2003–2006	Mighty Barolle		
2007–2008	LPRC Oilers		
2009–2011	FCAK		

International career
1997–2008	Liberia	40	(1)
- * Club domestic league appearances and goals

Varmah Kpoto (born 28 January 1978) is a Liberian footballer who was capped 40 times for the Liberia national football team.

== Club career ==
Kpoto joined Greek second division side Olympiacos Volos for the 1999–00 season.

== International career ==
Kpoto made his international debut for Liberia in a 1998 African Cup of Nations qualifying match against Tanzania on 27 July 1997.
