= Inter CDF SE =

- Full name: Internationale Club de Football Sport Egyesulet
- Nickname: Inter CDF
- Founded: 2006
- Ground: Siketek Pálya, Budapest
- Capacity: 700
- Chairman: (Nigeria) Nelson Victor
- Manager: (Hungary) Joel A. Geraldo
- League: BLSZ 1
- 2012–13: 2nd (promoted)
Home colours	Away colours

Internationale Club de Football Sportegyesület aka Inter CDF SE is a football club, based in Budapest, Hungary.

Founded in 2006 as Afrique Internationale Club de Football Sport Egyesulet by Africans and Hungarians in Budapest. In 2008, the club changed its name to Internationale Club de Football Sport Egyesület (Inter CDF SE). The colours were also changed from red and blue to white, blue and sky blue. The club is a member of the official football league of the Hungarian Football Federation based in Budapest. Currently the club has one senior team in the top level of Hungarian amateur football league as well as academy.

== History ==
Internationale Club de Football Sportegyesulet (Inter CDF SE) was founded in the summer of 2006. It was officially registered as a Hungarian football club on 22 August 2006 by the Hungarian government, Budapest football federation and the Hungarian Football Federation as Afrique Internationale Club de Football Sport Egyesulet. It was nicknamed "Afrique Inter FC". In 2008, "Afrique" was officially removed from the club's name and renamed its current name in other to represent all interest.

Internationale Club de Football was founded with the aim of using football as a means of engaging children and young people in constructive activities, while preparing them for social integration and leadership, irrespective of race, nationality, or social background.

Non acceptance of then young football players of African origin by most Hungarian clubs and the Hungarian society was one of reasons of the formation of Inter CDF SE, in order to help the boys integrate into the Hungarian society and to keep their dream alive and not being laid astray by some in their community.

The formation of Inter CDF SE was part of the effort to create an enabling environment for the young talents here to integrate into the Hungarian society.

The first Inter CDF team paraded footballing talent from Nigeria, Ghana, Cameroon, Sudan, Ivory Coast, Liberia. The club also had of a number of talented Hungarians. The team was first coached and captained by Nelson Victor. Later, former Liberian international by name John Moses was contact to coach the team. Which made it to the final of the Budapest Kupa in 2007 which they lost 3-1 to TFSE. In 2008 Agonglo Geraldo Joel was contacted to coach the team. Inter CDF failed in their second attempt to win the Budapest cup in 2015, losing 1-4 to Pénzügyőr SE who were one division higher.

=== Foundation ===
Internationale Club de Football Sport Egyesulet (Inter CDF SE) was founded in late summer of 2006 by Nelson Victor and friends. It was officially registered as a Hungarian football club on 22 August 2006 by the Hungarian government, Budapest football federation and the Hungarian football federation as Afrique Internationale Club de Football Sport Egyesulet. It was nicknamed "Afrique Inter FC". In 2008, "Afrique" was officially removed from the club's name. Non acceptance of then young football potentials of African origin by most Hungarian clubs and the Hungarian society led to the formation of Inter CDF SE in order to help the boys integrate into the Hungarian society and to keep their dream alive and not being laid astray by some in their community. It paraded footballing talents from Nigeria, Ghana, Cameroon, Sudan, Ivory Coast, and Liberia. The club also had of a number of talented young Hungarian players. According to Mr. Nelson Victor, "Inter CDF SE was part of the effort of the organizers of the club to create an enabling environment for the young African talents here to integrate into the Hungarian society."

=== Orczy Park ===
2006-2008: Budapest, Orczy kert 1. With a standing capacity of 2000, was the first home of Inter CDF SE. No visiting team escaped defeat in Orczy Park. It still hold the record of Inter CDF SE match attendance and supporters. Unfortunately, after 2008 season the club had to relocate her home matches due to the poor playing pitch condition.

=== Tatai utca ===
2008-2011: (1142 Budapest, Tatai út 3/b ). Capacity; 500.

=== Siketek pálya ===
Bp 1097, Könyves Kálmán kőrút 28, is the current home of Inter CDF SE since the 2012 season. It is a small stadium with a sitting capacity of 168 and standing about 500.

== League history ==
Season	League	division	Club's name	Place	Points
2012/2013	Budapest II	5	Inter CDFSE	2	64
2011/2012	Budapest 1B	5	Inter CDFSE	3	60
2010/2011	Budapest 1B	5	Inter CDFSE	8	43
2009/2010	Budapest 1B	5	Inter CDFSE	3	66
2008/2009	Budapest II/1	6	Inter CDFSE	1	66
2007/2008	Budapest III/1	7	Afrique Inter CDFSE	1	66
2006/2007	Budapest IV/2	8	Afrique Inter CDFSE	1	60

== Club colours ==
White, blue and sky-blue are the club's new colours since 2012, it replaces the former red and blue colours as reflected in the new logo which as well replaced the previous one.

== Honours ==
Winner

- 2014. Perbal kupa.
- 2008/2009. Blsz II/1.
- 2007/2008. Blsz III.
- 2006/2007. Blsz IV. /2.

Runners up

- 2015 Budapest Kupa.
- 2012/2013 Blsz II.
- 2007 Budapest cup.

== First team squad ==
As of 23 August 2014

Note: Flags indicate national team as defined under FIFA eligibility rules; some limited exceptions apply. Players may hold more than one non-FIFA nationality.

No.	Pos.	Nation	Player
18	GK	HUN	Skadra László
6	DF	NGA	Ndubueze Obinna Nwosu
20	DF	NGA	John Paul
4	MF	NGA	Aigbekaen Oti Dickson
16	MF	GBR	Giwa Olakunle
12	MF	NGA	Samson Emmanuel (captain)
15	MF	GBR	Gbo Gbagbo Mandela
9	MF	NGA	Johnbull Innocent Uche
13	FW	NGA	Chigozie Davies Iyiegbu
5	DF	NGA	Kingsley Egwavon Edo
4	DF	NGA	Njoku Victor Nwosu
10	FW	CMR	Zome Louis
7	FW	FRA	Lunzitisa Queson
2	DF	CMR	Antem Sebastian Egbela
3	FW	GUI	Fofana Sekou

No.	Pos.	Nation	Player
8	DF	NGA	Ikele Samuel Victor
1	GK	NGA	Eniefiok Francis Edem
21	FW	LBR	Christian Essel
22	DF	NGA	Moses Nelson Victor
11	FW	HUN	Kiss Renato
19	GK	HUN	Debreczeni Krisztián
23	FW	NGA	Nnuji Kelechi Kissinger
33	MF	CMR	Christian Bodiong Ebala
8	FW	NGA	Henry Odia
15	FW	NGA	Igwilo Somto Kingsley
11	FW	HUN	Zámbo Tibor

== 2013 squad ==
As of 17 August 2012

Note: Flags indicate national team as defined under FIFA eligibility rules; some limited exceptions apply. Players may hold more than one non-FIFA nationality.

No.	Pos.	Nation	Player
18	GK	HUN	Skadra László
15	DF	HUN	Röst Ferenc
14	DF	HUN	Kovács Zoltán
4	MF	NGA	Umooh Toni (captain)
8	MF	HUN	Ódor Zoltán
12	MF	NGA	Samson Emmanuel
17	MF	IRN	Ahadi Askhan
9	FW	HUN	Zámbo Tibor
13	FW	NGA	Chigozie Davies Iyiegbu
6	DF	HUN	Fábián Norbert
20	MF	HUN	Trizna Tamas
33	FW	NGA	Shodeinde Gafar Abiodun
7	FW	HUN	Jonás Attila

No.	Pos.	Nation	Player
11	FW	HUN	Kiss Renato
1	GK	HUN	Debreczeni Krisztián
19	GK	CMR	Tazoh Roland
16	DF	IRN	Ahmad Ebrahimi
10	MF	HUN	Csemer Elemer
2	DF	CMR	Antem Sebastian Egbela
3	FW	GUI	Fofana Sekou
5	DF	HUN	Horváth Gellert
13	DF	IRQ	Dali Shechi Vian
21	FW	LBR	Christian Essel
19	DF	NGA	Ikele Samuel Victor
27	FW	HUN	Mallinerits Norbert
23	FW	IRN	Ahadi Askhan
29	DF	HUN	Pástor Ádám
