= Manu Hervás =

Spanish footballer

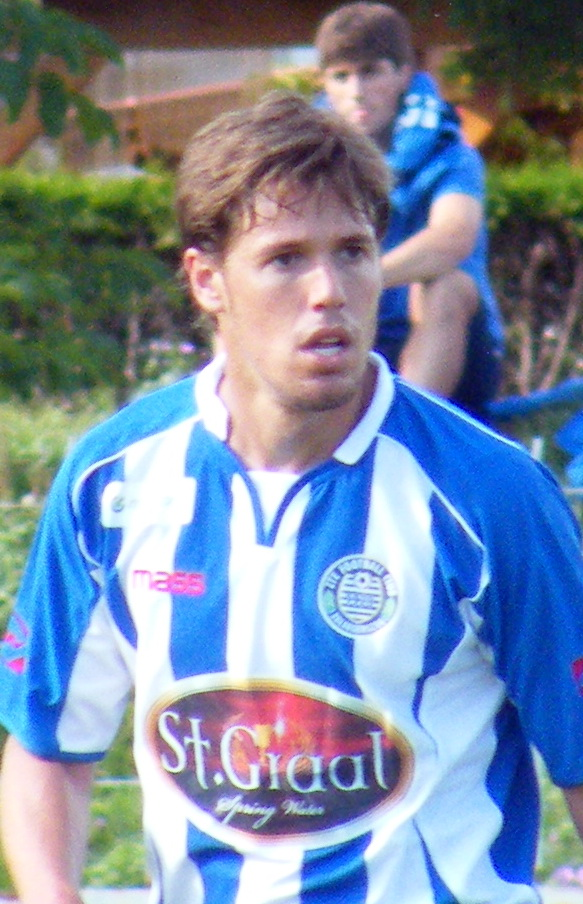
- Hervás as a Zalaegerszegi player

Personal information
- Full name: Manuel Hernández-Sonseca Hervás
- Date of birth: 6 June 1986 (age 40)
- Place of birth: Aranjuez, Spain
- Height: 1.85 m (6 ft 1 in)
- Position: Midfielder

Team information
- Current team: Lausanne-Sport (assistant)

Youth career
- Aranjuez

Senior career*
Years	Team	Apps	(Gls)
2004–2006	Atlético Madrid B	4	(0)
2006–2007	Lanzarote	11	(0)
2007–2010	Getafe B		
2007	Getafe	0	(0)
2010–2011	Admira Wacker	5	(0)
2010–2011	Admira Wacker (A)	12	(1)
2011–2012	Zalaegerszegi	19	(0)
2012–2013	Valdres	24	(2)
2014–2016	Gjøvik-Lyn		
Total		75	(3)

Managerial career
- 2017–2018: Raufoss (youth)
- 2019–2020: Viking (youth)
- 2020–2021: Atromitos (assistant)
- 2021–2022: Rheindorf Altach (assistant)
- 2022–: Lausanne-Sport (assistant)
- * Club domestic league appearances and goals

Manuel 'Manu' Hernández-Sonseca Hervás (born 6 June 1986) is a Spanish retired footballer who played as a defensive midfielder, and the current assistant manager of Swiss Challenge League club Lausanne-Sport.
