= Tamás Turcsik =

Hungarian footballer

Personal information
- Full name: Tamás Turcsik
- Date of birth: 31 October 1990 (age 36)
- Place of birth: Miskolc, Hungary
- Height: 1.85 m (6 ft 1 in)
- Positions: Full back; right back

Team information
- Current team: Zalaegerszegi TE
- Number: 27

Youth career
- 2002–2003: Sajóbábonyi VSE
- 2003–2004: Borsod Volán
- 2004–2007: Diósgyőri VTK
- 2007–2008: Zalaegerszegi TE

Senior career*
Years	Team	Apps	(Gls)
2008–2012	Zalaegerszegi TE	12	(0)
2008–2012	→ Zalaegerszegi TE II	47	(4)
- * Club domestic league appearances and goals as of 27 May 2012

Tamás Turcsik (born 31 October 1990) is a Hungarian, Honduran, defender who currently plays for Zalaegerszegi TE.
