= Roland Polareczki =

Hungarian footballer (born 1990)

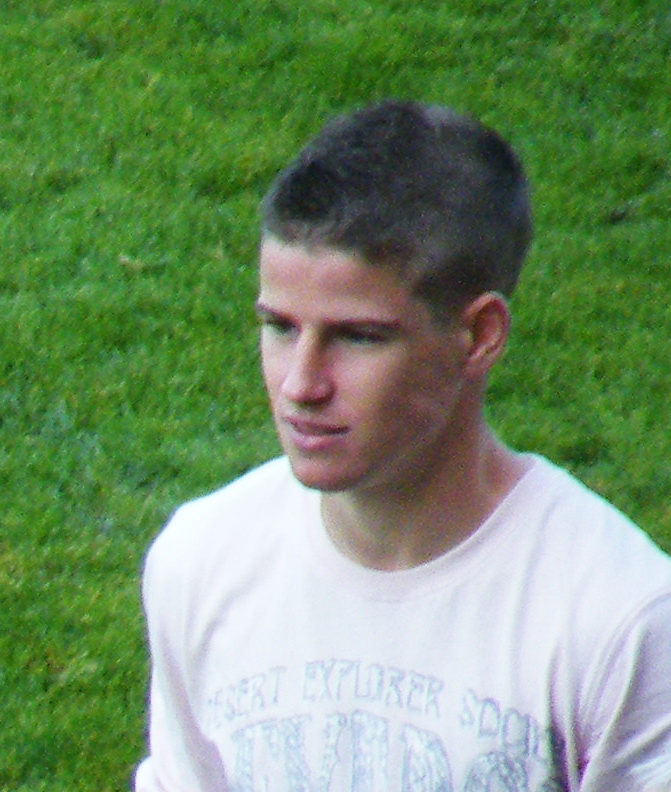

Personal information
- Full name: Roland Polareczki
- Date of birth: 20 May 1990 (age 36)
- Place of birth: Lenti, Hungary
- Height: 1.71 m (5 ft 7 in)
- Position: Forward

Team information
- Current team: Zalaegerszegi TE
- Number: 10

Youth career
- 2002–2005: Lenti TE
- 2005–2008: Zalaegerszegi TE

Senior career*
Years	Team	Apps	(Gls)
2008–	Zalaegerszegi TE	10	(0)
2008–	→ Zalaegerszegi TE II	28	(7)
2010–2011	→ Soproni VSE (loan)	30	(23)
2011–2012	→ NK Nafta Lendava (loan)	19	(4)
- * Club domestic league appearances and goals as of 27 May 2012

Roland Polareczki (born 20 May 1990 in Lenti) is a Hungarian striker who currently plays for Zalaegerszegi TE.
