= Bálint Gaál =

Hungarian footballer

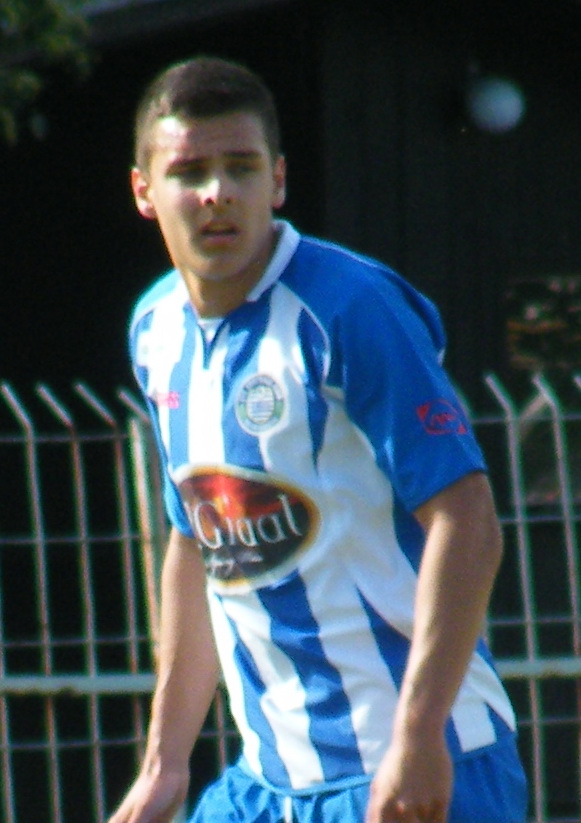

Personal information
- Date of birth: 14 July 1991 (age 35)
- Place of birth: Szombathely, Hungary
- Height: 1.84 m (6 ft 1/2 in)
- Position: Forward

Team information
- Current team: Ajka
- Number: 14

Youth career
- 2005–2006: Haladás
- 2006–2009: MTK

Senior career*
Years	Team	Apps	(Gls)
2009	Hartberg	3	(0)
2009–2011	Ajka	48	(14)
2011–2012	Zalaegerszeg	0	(0)
2011–2012	→ Ajka (loan)	22	(9)
2012–2014	Sopron	49	(14)
2014–2017	Haladás	67	(15)
2017–2018	Vasas	35	(8)
2018–2020	Haladás	45	(7)
2020	Győr	5	(0)
2020–2021	Siófok	33	(2)
2021–	Ajka	84	(18)
- * Club domestic league appearances and goals as of 20 December 2023

Bálint Gaál (born 14 July 1991) is a Hungarian football player who plays for Ajka.

== Career statistics ==
Appearances and goals by club, season and competition
Club	Season	League		Cup		League Cup		Europe		Total	
Club	Season	Apps	Goals	Apps	Goals	Apps	Goals	Apps	Goals	Apps	Goals
Hartberg
Hartberg	2008–09	3	0	0	0	0	0	0	0	3	0
Hartberg	Total	3	0	0	0	0	0	0	0	3	0
Ajka
Ajka	2009–10	25	4	3	1	0	0	0	0	28	5
Ajka	2010–11	23	10	1	1	0	0	0	0	24	11
Ajka	2011–12	22	9	1	1	0	0	0	0	23	10
Ajka	Total	70	23	5	3	0	0	0	0	75	26
Sopron
Sopron	2012–13	19	5	3	2	0	0	0	0	22	7
Sopron	2013–14	30	9	2	2	3	1	0	0	35	12
Sopron	Total	49	14	5	4	3	1	0	0	57	19
Haladás
Haladás	2014–15	27	1	3	3	2	1	–	–	32	5
Haladás	2015–16	26	7	5	2	–	–	–	–	31	9
Haladás	2016–17	14	7	2	0	–	–	–	–	16	7
Haladás	2018–19	26	5	3	0	–	–	–	–	29	5
Haladás	Total	93	20	13	5	2	1	0	0	108	26
Vasas
Vasas	2016–17	13	2	5	1	–	–	–	–	18	3
Vasas	2017–18	22	6	1	0	–	–	–	–	23	7
Vasas	Total	35	8	6	1	0	0	0	0	41	9
Career total		250	65	29	13	4	2	0	0	283	80

Updated to games played as of 19 May 2019.
