= Paolo Mavolo =

Hungarian footballer

Personal information
- Full name: Paolo Mavolo
- Date of birth: 6 March 1992 (age 34)
- Place of birth: Hungary
- Position: Forward

Team information
- Current team: ZALAWARE Botfa
- Number: 17

Youth career
- 2003–2006: Nagykanizsai TE
- 2006–2012: Zalaegerszegi TE

Senior career*
Years	Team	Apps	(Gls)
2012	Zalaegerszegi TE	4	(1)
2013	Nagykanizsa TE	13	(0)
2013–2014	Andráshida SC	25	(1)
2014–2015	Sárvár FC	26	(6)
2015	Andráshida SC	14	(3)
2016–2017	Szerszámsziget Zalalövő	38	(18)
2017	Göcsej SK	2	(0)
2017–2019	USV Burgauberg/Neudauberg		
2019–	Olajmunkás SE Gellénháza	13	(14)
- * Club domestic league appearances and goals as of 21:57, 5 December 2019 (UTC)

Paolo Mavolo (born 6 March 1992) is a Hungarian forward who currently plays for ZALAWARE Botfa.
