= Zaytuna F.C. =

- Full name: Zaytuna Football Club United
- Founded: December 17, 1997
- Ground: Amanfro
- Chairman: Abdul Karim Lamptey
- League: Poly Tank Division One League

Zaytuna F.C. United is a Ghanaian professional football club based in Amanfro, Accra, Greater Accra. They are currently competing in the Ghana Poly Tank Division One League, formerly of Ghana Premier League.

== History ==
Zaytuna F.C., formally known as Stay Cool F.C., was formed on December 17, 1997 by the club's president and CEO Alhaji Franko Lamtey. The club started at the second division level and initially competed with eighteen other second division teams.

Within two years of its existence, the club set a record of playing 30 consecutive league matches without a defeat in the Second Division. It was promoted to the First Division in 1999.

In the year 2000, the football club initiated a campaign to secure a spot in the prestigious premiership. They achieved this 2003 when they reached second place in the Division One League and earned promotion. Financed solely by Lamptey, the foray into the Premier Division was short-lived as relegation ensued after a single year in 2004.

In 2004, the club changed its name from Stay Cool F.C. to Zaytuna F.C. United and launched another campaign for the premiership. They qualified again for the premiership in 2006.

The premiership home games were played at the El Wak Stadium. The club was relegated again to Division One in 2008.
