= 2007–08 Zalaegerszegi TE season =

Zalaegerszeg
2007–08 season
- Manager: Slavko Petrović (until 30 April); Mihály Nagy (from 30 April)
- Stadium: ZTE Arena
- Nemzeti Bajnokság I: 7th
- Magyar Kupa: Round of 32
- Ligakupa: Autumn season: Semi-finals; Spring season: Quarter-finals
- UEFA Intertoto Cup: Second round
- Top goalscorer: League: Róbert Waltner (18); All: Róbert Waltner; Roguy Méyé (19 each)
- Average home league attendance: 4,780

The 2007–08 season was Zalaegerszegi Torna Egylet Football Club's 70th competitive season, 16th consecutive season in the Nemzeti Bajnokság I and 87th year in existence as a football club. In addition to the domestic league, Zalaegerszeg participated in this season's editions of the Magyar Kupa, Ligakupa and UEFA Intertoto Cup.

== First team squad ==
The players listed had league appearances and stayed until the end of the season.

Note: Flags indicate national team as defined under FIFA eligibility rules; some limited exceptions apply. Players may hold more than one non-FIFA nationality.

No.	Pos.	Nation	Player
1	GK	HUN	Géza Vlaszák
2	DF	HUN	Gergely Kocsárdi
4	DF	CRO	Lovre Vulin
5	DF	SVK	Peter Polgár
6	DF	ROU	Sorin Botiș
7	MF	HUN	Balázs Molnár
8	MF	HUN	Zoltán Tóth
9	FW	HUN	Róbert Waltner
10	MF	SRB	Milan Davidov
11	FW	SLO	Damir Pekič
12	GK	HUN	Krisztián Pogacsics

No.	Pos.	Nation	Player
15	FW	FRA	Mahamadou Diawara
16	MF	HUN	Péter Máté
17	FW	HUN	Zsolt Balázs
19	MF	HUN	Béla Koplárovics
20	FW	PLE	Imad Zatara
21	FW	GAB	Roguy Méyé
22	DF	SLO	Matej Miljatovič
32	MF	HUN	András Horváth
41	MF	HUN	Tibor Fülöp
51	DF	HUN	Gergő Kovács
52	MF	HUN	Csaba Ferkó

== Transfers ==
=== Transfers in ===
Transfer window	Pos.	No.	Player	From	Ref
Summer	GK	1	(Serbia) Đorđe Babalj	(Serbia) Vojvodina	
Summer	DF	2	(Serbia) Ivan Dudić	(Serbia) Bežanija	
Summer	DF	5	(Slovakia) Peter Polgár	(Slovakia) Slovan Bratislava	
Summer	MF	10	(Serbia) Milan Davidov	(Serbia) Vojvodina	
Summer	FW	11	(Slovenia) Damir Pekič	(Slovenia) Maribor	
Summer	MF	13	(Hungary) Tihamér Lukács	Pécs	
Summer	MF	14	(Hungary) Árpád Majoros	Vasas	
Summer	FW	15	(France) Mahamadou Diawara	(France) Entente SSG	
Summer	MF	20	(Hungary) Norbert Tóth	Rákospalota	
Summer	DF	22	(Slovenia) Matej Miljatovič	(Germany) Kickers Offenbach	
Summer	MF	41	(Hungary) Tibor Fülöp	Makó	
Winter	DF	2	(Hungary) Gergely Kocsárdi	(Slovenia) Nafta Lendava	
Winter	GK	1	(Hungary) Géza Vlaszák	(Greece) AEL Limassol	
Winter	FW	20	(Palestine) Imad Zatara	(Sweden) Brommapojkarna	
Winter	FW	21	(Gabon) Roguy Méyé	(Gabon) Mangasport	
Winter	MF	52	(Hungary) Csaba Ferkó	Integrál-DAC	

=== Transfers out ===
Transfer window	Pos.	No.	Player	To	Ref
Summer	GK	1	(Slovakia) Martin Lipčák	(Slovakia) Neded	
Summer	DF	2	(Hungary) Gergely Kocsárdi	(Slovenia) Nafta Lendava	
Winter	GK	1	(Serbia) Đorđe Babalj	(Serbia) Vojvodina	
Winter	DF	2	(Serbia) Ivan Dudić	Újpest	
Winter	DF	3	(Hungary) Tamás Kádár	(England) Newcastle United	
Winter	MF	14	(Hungary) Árpád Majoros	(Poland) Cracovia	
Winter	MF	20	(Hungary) Norbert Tóth	Szombathelyi Haladás	

=== Loans in ===
Transfer window	Pos.	No.	Player	From	End date	Ref

=== Loans out ===
Transfer window	Pos.	No.	Player	From	End date	Ref
Summer	FW	9	(Hungary) Róbert Waltner	(United Arab Emirates) Al Dhafra	February 2008	
Winter	MF	13	(Hungary) Tihamér Lukács	(Bulgaria) Vihren	End of season	
Winter	MF	18	(Hungary) Gábor Simonfalvi	Pécs	End of season	

== Competitions ==
=== Overview ===
Competition	First match	Last match	Starting round	Final position	Record							
Competition	First match	Last match	Starting round	Final position	Pld	W	D	L	GF	GA	GD	Win %
Nemzeti Bajnokság I	20 July 2007	2 June 2008	Matchday 1	7th	30	13	7	10	55	39	+16	43.33
Magyar Kupa	29 August 2007	26 September 2007	Third round	Round of 32	2	1	0	1	11	2	+9	50.00
Ligakupa (Autumn season)	15 August 2007	14 November 2007	Group stage	Semi-finals	10	8	1	1	26	11	+15	80.00
Ligakupa (Spring season)	1 December 2007	12 March 2008	Group stage	Quarter-finals	8	4	3	1	19	5	+14	50.00
UEFA Intertoto Cup	7 July 2007	14 July 2007	Second round	Second round	2	0	0	2	0	5	−5	0.00
Total					52	26	11	15	111	62	+49	50.00

Source: Competitions

=== Nemzeti Bajnokság I ===
==== League table ====
Pos	Team	Pld	W	D	L	GF	GA	GD	Pts	Qualification or relegation
5	Fehérvár	30	17	3	10	48	32	+16	54	
6	Kaposvár	30	14	9	7	48	38	+10	51	
7	Zalaegerszeg	30	13	7	10	55	39	+16	46	
8	Honvéd	30	12	7	11	45	36	+9	43	Qualification for Intertoto Cup first round
9	Vasas	30	12	5	13	41	45	−4	41	

Source: soccerway.com

==== Results summary ====
Overall								Home						Away					
Pld	W	D	L	GF	GA	GD	Pts	W	D	L	GF	GA	GD	W	D	L	GF	GA	GD
30	13	7	10	55	39	+16	46	8	4	3	33	18	+15	5	3	7	22	21	+1

Source: Hungarian Football Federation

==== Results by round ====
Round	1	2	3	4	5	6	7	8	9	10	11	12	13	14	15	16	17	18	19	20	21	22	23	24	25	26	27	28	29	30
Ground	H	A	H	A	H	H	A	H	A	H	A	H	A	H	A	A	H	A	H	A	A	H	A	H	A	H	A	H	A	H
Result	W	D	W	L	W	D	L	W	L	D	L	W	W	W	L	W	W	D	L	D	L	L	W	W	L	D	W	D	W	L
Position	4	6	3	6	3	4	7	6	7	7	9	6	6	6	7	7	7	7	7	7	8	8	8	7	7	7	7	7	7	7

Source: Matches
A = Away; H = Home; W = Win; D = Draw; L = Loss

==== Matches ====
20 July 2007 1	Zalaegerszeg	3–1	Paks	Zalaegerszeg
19:00 CEST (UTC+2)	Z. Tóth 45'; Waltner 60', 90+3' (pen.); Vulin (yellow card) 86'	Report	Márkus 6'; Zováth (yellow card) 20'; T. Kiss I (yellow card) 41'; Tököli (yellow card) 84'; Balaskó (red card) 88'	Stadium: ZTE Arena; Attendance: 4,500; Referee: Tamás Arany

27 July 2007 2	Újpest	1–1	Zalaegerszeg	Budapest
19:00 CEST (UTC+2)	Kéthévoama 61'; Pető (yellow card) 81'	Report	N. Tóth 45'; Vulin (yellow card) 56'; Miljatovič (yellow card) 80'; Davidov (yellow card) 82'; P. Máté I (yellow card) 89'	Stadium: Ferenc Szusza Stadium; Attendance: 4,223; Referee: Péter Solymosi

3 August 2007 3	Zalaegerszeg	4–1	Diósgyőr	Zalaegerszeg
19:00 CEST (UTC+2)	Pekič 17'; Polgár (yellow card) 59'; Waltner 69', 81' (pen.); Davidov (yellow card) 82'; Vulin 85'	Report	Abdou 28'; N. Farkas (red card) 61'; Lakatos (yellow card) 80'	Stadium: ZTE Arena; Attendance: 5,500; Referee: Sándor Andó-Szabó

11 August 2007 4	Debrecen	3–2	Zalaegerszeg	Debrecen
15:00 CEST (UTC+2)	Dzsudzsák 19', 55', (yellow card) 72'; Vukmir (yellow card) 19'; Bernáth (yellow card) 20'; Demjén 53'	Report	Polgár (yellow card) 14'; Koplárovics 30'; Vulin (yellow card) 35'; Pekič 43'; Dudić (yellow card) 72'	Stadium: Stadion Oláh Gábor Út; Attendance: 5,500; Referee: Mihály Fábián

18 August 2007 5	Zalaegerszeg	2–0	Siófok	Zalaegerszeg
19:00 CEST (UTC+2)	Waltner 51', 68'	Report	Tusori (yellow card) 66'; Fomumbod (yellow card) 89'	Stadium: ZTE Arena; Attendance: 6,000; Referee: József Berger

25 August 2007 6	Zalaegerszeg	0–0	Győr	Zalaegerszeg
19:00 CEST (UTC+2)		Report	Šupić (yellow card) 17'; Bajzát (yellow card) 28'; Müller (yellow card) 55'	Stadium: ZTE Arena; Attendance: 8,000; Referee: Szabolcs Szilasi

3 September 2007 7	MTK	4–1	Zalaegerszeg	Budapest
18:00 CEST (UTC+2)	Urbán 22'; Kulcsár (yellow card) 37'; Bori 75', (yellow card) 75'; J. Kanta 85'; Szabó 90'	Report	Pekič 13'; Vulin (yellow card) 40'; P. Máté I (yellow card) 41'	Stadium: Hidegkuti Nándor Stadion; Attendance: 1,200; Referee: Ferenc Bede

15 September 2007 8	Zalaegerszeg	2–1	Kaposvár	Zalaegerszeg
18:00 CEST (UTC+2)	Miljatovič (yellow card) 2'; Dudić (yellow card) 9'; Waltner 13', 32'; Polgár (yellow card) 19'; P. Máté I (yellow card) 51'	Report	Zahorecz 2' (pen.), (red card) 86'; Maróti (yellow card) 41'	Stadium: ZTE Arena; Attendance: 5,500; Referee: István Vad

21 September 2007 9	Honvéd	2–1	Zalaegerszeg	Budapest
19:00 CEST (UTC+2)	Guié 31'; Bárányos 47'; Vincze (yellow card) 80'	Report	Z. Tóth (yellow card) 17', (goal) 32'; Dudić (red card) 67'; B. Molnár (yellow card) 68'; Méyé (yellow card) 85'	Stadium: Bozsik József Stadion; Attendance: 2,000; Referee: Zoltán Iványi

28 September 2007 10	Zalaegerszeg	3–3	Vasas	Zalaegerszeg
19:00 CEST (UTC+2)	B. Molnár (yellow card) 8'; Méyé 15', 76' (pen.); Vulin (yellow card) 43'; N. Tóth 67' (pen.)	Report	A. Tóth 26', 84'; N. Németh (yellow card) 42'; B. Tóth (yellow card) 77'; Sowunmi 81'; Balog (yellow card) 88'; Lázok (yellow card) 90+4'	Stadium: ZTE Arena; Attendance: 3,000; Referee: István Mészáros

6 October 2007 11	Nyíregyháza	2–1	Zalaegerszeg	Nyíregyháza
15:00 CEST (UTC+2)	Bagoly (yellow card) 34'; Cornaci (yellow card) 67', (goal) 70'; Vukadinović 78'	Report	Koplárovics 2'; Méyé (yellow card) 40'; N. Tóth (yellow card) 45'; Vulin (yellow card) 56'	Stadium: Városi Stadion; Attendance: 5,000; Referee: Krisztián Pánczél

20 October 2007 12	Zalaegerszeg	4–1	Tatabánya	Zalaegerszeg
18:00 CEST (UTC+2)	Pekič 18'; Méyé 20' (pen.); Koplárovics 28'; Miljatovič 53', (yellow card) 89'; N. Tóth (yellow card) 90'	Report	Hajdú 13'	Stadium: ZTE Arena; Attendance: 3,500; Referee: Zsolt Szabó

3 November 2007 13	Rákospalota	1–2	Zalaegerszeg	Budapest
13:30 CET (UTC+1)	Pusztai 8'; Rása (yellow card) 26'; B. Kovács (yellow card) 76'	Report	Z. Tóth 18'; Méyé 76' (pen.); Dudić (yellow card) 90+2'	Stadium: Stadion Budai II. Laszló; Attendance: 400; Referee: Mihály Fábián

10 November 2007 14	Zalaegerszeg	4–0	Sopron	Zalaegerszeg
16:00 CET (UTC+1)	Méyé 38', 76' (pen.); B. Molnár (yellow card) 68'; Kádár 81'; Koplárovics 85'	Report	Takács (yellow card) 75'; Zana (yellow card) 84'; Csikós (yellow card) 87'	Stadium: ZTE Arena; Attendance: 3,500; Referee: Tamás Bognár

24 November 2007 15	Fehérvár	2–0	Zalaegerszeg	Székesfehérvár
13:00 CET (UTC+1)	Dvéri 31', (yellow card) 33'; Csobánki (yellow card) 72'; B. Farkas 80'	Report	Miljatovič (yellow card) 1'; P. Máté I (yellow card) 61'; Z. Tóth (yellow card) 71'	Stadium: Sóstói Stadion; Attendance: 1,000; Referee: Péter Solymosi

23 February 2008 16	Paks	0–3	Zalaegerszeg	Pécs
16:00 CET (UTC+1)	Éger (yellow card) 80'	Report	Méyé 11', 22'; Botiș (yellow card) 20'; Koplárovics (yellow card) 40'; Vulin (yellow card) 50'; Z. Tóth (yellow card) 73'; Balázs 75'	Stadium: Stadion PMFC; Attendance: 300; Referee: Zoltán Iványi

29 February 2008 17	Zalaegerszeg	4–1	Újpest	Zalaegerszeg
19:00 CET (UTC+1)	Zatara 15', 58'; Waltner 19'; Méyé 44'; Vulin (yellow card) 76'; B. Molnár (yellow card) 81'	Report	Sadjo (yellow card) 5'; Tisza 55'; Dourandi (yellow card) 81'	Stadium: ZTE Arena; Attendance: 7,500; Referee: Tamás Arany

8 March 2008 18	Diósgyőr	1–1	Zalaegerszeg	Miskolc
16:00 CET (UTC+1)	Vitelki (yellow card) 46'; Sebők 90+1'	Report	Miljatovič (yellow card) 17'; Waltner 59', (yellow card) 83'; B. Molnár (yellow card) 90+2'	Stadium: Diósgyőri Stadion; Attendance: 3,000; Referee: Ferenc Bede

15 March 2008 19	Zalaegerszeg	1–2	Debrecen	Zalaegerszeg
15:00 CET (UTC+1)	Méyé (yellow card) 11'; Botiș 35'	Report	P. Máté II (yellow card) 17'; Dombi 43'; Czvitkovics 69'	Stadium: ZTE Arena; Attendance: 10,000; Referee: Péter Solymosi

22 March 2008 20	Siófok	1–1	Zalaegerszeg	Siófok
16:00 CET (UTC+1)	Magasföldi 85'	Report	P. Máté I (yellow card) 49'; Waltner 71'; Miljatovič (yellow card) 80'	Stadium: Révész Street Stadium; Attendance: 600; Referee: Zoltán Iványi

29 March 2008 21	Győr	3–2	Zalaegerszeg	Győr
15:00 CET (UTC+1)	Pákolicz 27'; Brnović 32', 90+3'; Völgyi (yellow card) 88'	Report	Polgár (yellow card) 47'; Waltner 68', 71'; Botiș (yellow card) 77'; Méyé (yellow card) 83'	Stadium: ETO Park; Attendance: 4,000; Referee: Tamás Arany

4 April 2008 22	Zalaegerszeg	0–1	MTK	Zalaegerszeg
19:00 CEST (UTC+2)	B. Molnár (yellow card) 65'	Report	Hrepka 14'; Á. Pintér II (yellow card) 37'; Pál (yellow card) 55'; Pollák (yellow card) 57'	Stadium: ZTE Arena; Attendance: 3,500; Referee: Ferenc Bede

14 April 2008 23	Kaposvár	0–2	Zalaegerszeg	Kaposvár
18:00 CEST (UTC+2)	A. Pintér (yellow card) 38'; Petrók (yellow card) 65'; Grúz (yellow card) 74'	Report	Méyé 5', (yellow card) 45'; Zatara (yellow card) 58'; Waltner 65' (pen.); P. Máté I (yellow card) 84'	Stadium: Stadion Rákóczi; Attendance: 3,000; Referee: Tamás Bognár

21 April 2008 24	Zalaegerszeg	2–1	Honvéd	Zalaegerszeg
18:00 CEST (UTC+2)	Méyé (yellow card) 16'; Miljatovič (yellow card) 18'; B. Molnár (yellow card) 36'; Botiș (yellow card) 60'; Waltner 72', 88'	Report	Angoua (yellow card) 3'; Dieng 36'; Koós (yellow card) 83'	Stadium: ZTE Arena; Attendance: 1,700; Referee: István Vad

25 April 2008 25	Vasas	1–0	Zalaegerszeg	Budapest
19:00 CEST (UTC+2)	Balog (yellow card) 41'; Kincses 63', (yellow card) 63'; Unierzyski (yellow card) 68'	Report	Vlaszák (yellow card) 8'; Pekič (yellow card) 85'; P. Máté I (yellow card) 86'	Stadium: Stadion Rudolf Illovszky; Attendance: 1,000; Referee: Gergely Sulyok

3 May 2008 26	Zalaegerszeg	0–0	Nyíregyháza	Zalaegerszeg
19:00 CEST (UTC+2)	Botiș (yellow card) 40'	Report	Cséke (yellow card) 25'; Mboussi (yellow card) 41'; Ramos (yellow card) 80'	Stadium: ZTE Arena; Attendance: 5,000; Referee: Szabolcs Szilasi

10 May 2008 27	Tatabánya	0–2	Zalaegerszeg	Budapest
19:00 CEST (UTC+2)		Report	Waltner 3'; Miljatovič 28'; Vulin (yellow card) 72'; Z. Tóth (yellow card) 84'	Stadium: Szőnyi úti Stadion; Attendance: 0 Referee: Sándor Andó-Szabó

17 May 2008 28	Zalaegerszeg	3–3	Rákospalota	Zalaegerszeg
19:00 CEST (UTC+2)	Zatara 75'; Kapcsos 77' (o.g.); Waltner 90+3', (yellow card) 90+3'	Report	Somorjai 27', 73'; B. Kovács 85'	Stadium: ZTE Arena; Attendance: 2,500; Referee: Tamás Bognár

25 May 2008 29	Sopron	0–3 (Awarded)	Zalaegerszeg	Sopron
		Report		Stadium: Káposztás utcai Stadion

2 June 2008 30	Zalaegerszeg	1–3	Fehérvár	Zalaegerszeg
18:00 CEST (UTC+2)	Polgár (yellow card) 45'; Pekič 73'	Report	G. Horváth II 42', (yellow card) 90'; Nagy 51'; Sitku 83'	Stadium: ZTE Arena; Attendance: 2,000; Referee: Péter Solymosi

=== Magyar Kupa ===
29 August 2007 Third round	Bonyhád	0–10	Zalaegerszeg	Bonyhád
	Hosnyányszki (yellow card) 31'; Vizdár (yellow card) 31'; Mosonyi (yellow card) 52'; Illés (yellow card) 74'	Report	Lukács 9', 14'; Pekič 10'; Diawara 34', 36', 66'; N. Tóth 59'; Méyé 83'; Vulin 87'; Hosnyányszki 90' (o.g.)	Stadium: Bonyhád Völgység LC Sporttelep; Attendance: 800; Referee: Csaba Ursprung

26 September 2007 Round of 32	Integrál-DAC	2–1	Zalaegerszeg	Győr
	Présinger 27'; Laki 54'	Report	A. Horváth (yellow card) 62'; Davidov (yellow card) 73'; Koplárovics (yellow card) 75'; P. Máté I (yellow card) 90', (goal) 90+2' (pen.)	Stadium: Pápai úti sporttelep Attendance: 500; Referee: Péter Solymosi

=== Ligakupa ===
==== Autumn season ====
===== Group stage =====
Pos	Team	Pld	W	D	L	GF	GA	GD	Pts	Qualification	ZAL	RAK	SIO	KAP
1	Zalaegerszeg	6	5	1	0	18	7	+11	16	Advance to knockout phase	—	3–1	4–0	1–1
2	Rákospalota	6	2	2	2	14	12	+2	8	Advance to knockout phase	3–5	—	2–0	5–1
3	Siófok	6	2	1	3	9	12	−3	7		2–3	1–1	—	4–1
4	Kaposvár	6	0	2	4	6	16	−10	2		0–2	2–2	1–2	—

Source: HFF

15 August 2007 1	Kaposvár	0–2	Zalaegerszeg	Kaposvár
19:00 CEST (UTC+2)	Graszl (yellow card) 46'	Report	Lukács 29'; Kottán (yellow card) 70'; T. Molnár 73'	Stadium: Stadion Rákóczi; Attendance: 1,000; Referee: Tamás Bognár

23 August 2007 2	Zalaegerszeg	4–0	Siófok	Zalaegerszeg
20:30 CEST (UTC+2)	Balázs 26'; A. Horváth (yellow card) 61', (goal) 79'; T. Molnár 67'; Majoros 70'; Sági (yellow card) 90'	Report	Sütő (yellow card) 57'; Kozmor (yellow card) 74'	Stadium: ZTE Arena; Attendance: 800; Referee: Péter Solymosi

9 September 2007 3	Zalaegerszeg	3–1	Rákospalota	Zalaegerszeg
19:00 CEST (UTC+2)	Waltner 18'; Méyé 28'; N. Tóth 70', (yellow card) 73'	Report	Nyerges 33'; Pusztai (yellow card) 86'; Kapcsos (yellow card) 90+2'	Stadium: ZTE Arena; Referee: István Mészáros

19 September 2007 4	Rákospalota	3–5	Zalaegerszeg	Budapest
16:00 CEST (UTC+2)	Kőhalmi 14'; Matondo 18'; Délczeg 32'; T. Kiss II (yellow card) 40'	Report	T. Fülöp (yellow card) 40', (goal) 60'; Diawara 47', 67', (yellow card) 58'; P. Máté I 68' (pen.); Sági 88'	Stadium: Stadion Budai II. Laszló; Attendance: 250; Referee: Sándor Andó-Szabó

3 October 2007 5	Zalaegerszeg	1–1	Kaposvár	Zalaegerszeg
18:00 CEST (UTC+2)	Lukács 81'; Botiș (yellow card) 87'	Report	Graszl (yellow card) 12'; Tonkovic (yellow card) 66'; Suljic 77'; Szakály (red card) 90+2'	Stadium: ZTE Arena; Attendance: 800; Referee: Krisztián Király

10 October 2007 6	Siófok	2–3	Zalaegerszeg	Siófok
15:00 CEST (UTC+2)	Forgács (yellow card) 23'; Homonyik (yellow card) 63'; Fülöp 78', 84'	Report	Sági 14'; Botiș (yellow card) 54'; Simonfalvi 70'; Fülöp (yellow card) 82'; Balázs 86'	Stadium: Révész Street Stadium; Attendance: 100; Referee: József Erdős

===== Knockout phase =====
Quarter-finals

17 October 2007 First leg	Rákospalota	0–2	Zalaegerszeg	Budapest
14:30 CEST (UTC+2)	B. Kovács (yellow card) 19'; Kapcsos (yellow card) 37'; Pusztai (yellow card) 54'	Report	Vulin (yellow card) 27'; Pekič 28'; Botiș (yellow card) 37', (goal) 71'; Polgár (yellow card) 53'	Stadium: Stadion Budai II. Laszló; Attendance: 200; Referee: Roland Veizer

27 October 2007 Second leg	Zalaegerszeg	3–0 (5–0 agg.)	Rákospalota	Zalaegerszeg
16:00 CEST (UTC+2)	Balázs 14', 72'; Lukács 53'; Dudić (yellow card) 56'; Polgár (yellow card) 82'	Report	Erős (yellow card) 73'; Pusztai (red card) 75'; T. Kiss II (yellow card) 87'	Stadium: ZTE Arena; Attendance: 800; Referee: Krisztián Király
Note: Zalaegerszeg won 5–0 on aggregate.

Semi-finals

31 October 2007 First leg	Zalaegerszeg	2–1	Fehérvár	Zalaegerszeg
17:00 CET (UTC+1)	Méyé 54'; Botiș 70'; Vulin (yellow card) 71'	Report	Sitku 38', (yellow card) 42'; Dajić (yellow card) 59'; G. Horváth II (yellow card) 64'; Csobánki (yellow card) 76'	Stadium: ZTE Arena; Attendance: 1,500; Referee: Viktor Kassai

14 November 2007 Second leg	Fehérvár	3–1 (a.e.t.) (4–3 agg.)	Zalaegerszeg	Székesfehérvár
18:00 CET (UTC+1)	Mészáros (yellow card) 26'; Dajić (yellow card) 46'; Sitku 70', 116' (pen.); Á. Horváth (red card) 76'; Božić 90+2'	Report	Botiș (yellow card) 10'; P. Máté I (yellow card) 11'; Kádár (not on pitch) (yellow card) 11'; Méyé 45'; B. Molnár (yellow card) 48'	Stadium: Sóstói Stadion; Attendance: 152; Referee: Sándor Andó-Szabó
Note: Fehérvár won 4–3 on aggregate.

==== Spring season ====
===== Group stage =====
Pos	Team	Pld	W	D	L	GF	GA	GD	Pts	Qualification	ZAL	GYO	TAT	SOP
1	Zalaegerszeg	6	4	2	0	19	3	+16	14	Advance to knockout phase	—	1–1	7–0	5–0
2	Győr	6	4	2	0	16	6	+10	14	Advance to knockout phase	1–1	—	3–2	4–1
3	Tatabánya	6	1	0	5	7	19	−12	3		1–2	1–4	—	3–0 (Note: Sopron couldn't finish the 2007–08 season due to bankruptcy. All remaining matches were counted as won for their opponents.)
4	Sopron	6	1	0	5	4	18	−14	3	Exclution	0–3	0–3	3–0	—

Source: HFF
Notes:

1 December 2007 1	Győr	1–1	Zalaegerszeg	Győr
13:00 CET (UTC+1)	Dudás 13'; Granát (yellow card) 83'	Report	Méyé 38'	Stadium: ETO Park; Attendance: 100; Referee: István Mészáros

5 December 2007 2	Zalaegerszeg	5–0	Sopron	Zalaegerszeg
13:00 CET (UTC+1)	Méyé 11'; Pekič 34'; P. Máté I (yellow card) 45'; Vulin (yellow card) 62'; Koplárovics 70', 78'; N. Tóth 83'	Report	Takács (red card) 25'; Tchana (yellow card) 45'	Stadium: ZTE Arena; Attendance: 700; Referee: Krisztián Pánczél

8 December 2007 3	Zalaegerszeg	7–0	Tatabánya	Zalaegerszeg
13:00 CET (UTC+1)	Méyé 9', 46'; Z. Tóth (yellow card) 17'; Botiș (yellow card) 19', (goal) 88'; Koplárovics 32', 38'; Balázs 55'; Lukács 71'; Simonfalvi (yellow card) 77'	Report	Kriston (yellow card) 22'; Béres (yellow card) 55'	Stadium: ZTE Arena; Attendance: 800; Referee: Ádám Németh

16 February 2008 4	Tatabánya	1–2	Zalaegerszeg	Tatabánya
14:00 CET (UTC+1)	Vulin 11' (o.g.); Almási (yellow card) 15'; Balogh (yellow card) 44'; Vámosi (yellow card) 45'; Kichi (yellow card) 72'; Flores (yellow card) 79'; Béres (yellow card) 82'	Report	Zatara (yellow card) 20'; Botiș (yellow card) 50'; Koplárovics 59'; Méyé 90'	Stadium: Stadion Városi; Attendance: 300; Referee: Tamás Bognár

20 February 2008 5	Zalaegerszeg	1–1	Győr	Zalaegerszeg
14:00 CET (UTC+1)	Sámson (yellow card) 8'; Fülöp 60'	Report	Z. Kovács 30'	Stadium: ZTE Arena; Attendance: 400; Referee: Krisztián Pánczél

27 February 2008 6	Sopron	0–3; Awarded	Zalaegerszeg	Sopron
		Report		Stadium: Stadion Városi

===== Knockout phase =====
Quarter-finals

5 March 2008 First leg	Siófok	2–0	Zalaegerszeg	Siófok
	B. Horváth 48'; Basara 84'	Report	Rácz (yellow card) 90'	Stadium: Révész Street Stadium; Attendance: 250; Referee: Szabolcs Szilasi

12 March 2008 Second leg	Zalaegerszeg	0–0 (0–2 agg.)	Siófok	Zalaegerszeg
	Balázs (yellow card) 27'; Z. Tóth (yellow card) 45'; Rácz (yellow card) 60'	Report		Stadium: ZTE Arena; Attendance: 500; Referee: Tamás Bognár
Note: Siófok won 2–0 on aggregate.

=== UEFA Intertoto Cup ===
Second round

7 July 2007 First leg	Zalaegerszeg (Hungary)	0–3	(Russia) Rubin Kazan	Zalaegerszeg, Hungary
19:30 CEST (UTC+2)	Botiș (yellow card) 20'; Polgár (yellow card) 33'; B. Molnár (yellow card) 44'; Lipčák (red card) 80'	Report	Volkov 21', 66', 81' (pen.); Baýramow (yellow card) 76'	Stadium: ZTE Arena; Attendance: 5,500; Referee: Robert Schörgenhofer (Austria)

14 July 2007 Second leg	Rubin Kazan (Russia)	2–0 (5–0 agg.)	(Hungary) Zalaegerszeg	Kazan, Russia
19:00 MSK (UTC+3)	Volkov 37' (pen.); Sibaya (yellow card) 45'; Jean 67'	Report	Z. Tóth (yellow card) 28'; P. Máté I (yellow card) 51'; Polgár (yellow card) 61'	Stadium: Central Stadium; Attendance: 7,000; Referee: Augustus Constantin (Romania)
Note: Rubin Kazan won 5-0 on aggregate.

== Statistics ==
=== Overall ===
Appearances (Apps) numbers are for appearances in competitive games only, including sub appearances.
Source: Competitions

No.	Player	Pos.	Nemzeti Bajnokság I				Magyar Kupa				Ligakupa				UEFA Intertoto Cup				Total			
No.	Player	Pos.	Apps	Goal	Yellow card	Red card	Apps	Goal	Yellow card	Red card	Apps	Goal	Yellow card	Red card	Apps	Goal	Yellow card	Red card	Apps	Goal	Yellow card	Red card
1	(Hungary) Géza Vlaszák	GK	13		1						1								14		1	
1	(Serbia) Đorđe Babalj	GK	15								5								20			
1	(Slovakia) Martin Lipčák	GK													1			1	1			1
2	(Serbia) Ivan Dudić	DF	12		3	1	1				9		1						22		4	1
2	(Hungary) Gergely Kocsárdi	DF	10								1								11			
3	(Hungary) Tamás Kádár	DF	9	1							4		1		2				15	1	1	
4	(Croatia) Lovre Vulin	DF	21	1	9		1	1			9		3						31	2	12	
5	(Slovakia) Peter Polgár	DF	20		5		2				9		2		2		2		33		9	
6	(Romania) Sorin Botiș	DF	17	1	4						10	3	6		2		1		29	4	11	
7	(Hungary) Balázs Molnár	MF	23		7		1				6		1		1		1		31		9	
8	(Hungary) Zoltán Tóth	MF	20	3	4		1				9		2		2		1		32	3	7	
9	(Hungary) Róbert Waltner	FW	22	18	2						1	1			2				25	19	2	
10	(Serbia) Milan Davidov	MF	28		2		2		1		8								38		3	
11	(Slovenia) Damir Pekič	FW	22	5	1		1	1			5	2							28	8	1	
12	(Hungary) Krisztián Pogacsics	GK	3				2				11				1				17			
13	(Hungary) Tihamér Lukács	MF	8				2	2			10	4			2				22	6		
14	(Hungary) Árpád Majoros	MF	2								4	1							6	1		
15	(France) Mahamadou Diawara	FW	8				1	3			1	2	1		2				12	5	1	
16	(Hungary) Péter Máté	MF	26		7		2	1	1		9	1	3		2		1		39	2	12	
17	(Hungary) Zsolt Balázs	FW	18	1			1				14	5	1		2				35	6	1	
17	(Hungary) Gábor Simonfalvi	MF	3				1				9	1	2		2				15	1	2	
19	(Hungary) Béla Koplárovics	MF	27	4	1		2		1		8	5			2				39	9	2	
20	(Hungary) Norbert Tóth	MF	14	2	2		1	1			7	2	1		1				23	5	3	
20	(Palestine) Imad Zatara	FW	12	3	1						1		1						13	3	2	
21	(Gabon) Roguy Méyé	FW	21	10	6		2	1			8	8							31	19	6	
22	(Slovenia) Matej Miljatovič	DF	25	2	7		1				7								33	2	7	
25	(Hungary) Ferenc Szommer	GK																				
30	(Hungary) Balázs Osbáth	GK																				
31	(Hungary) József Bozsik	MF									4				1				5			
32	(Hungary) András Horváth	MF	1				1		1		7	1	1		1				10	1	2	
33	(Hungary) Péter Németh	DF									2								2			
34	(Hungary) Zoltán Sámson										6		1						6		1	
35	(Hungary) Gábor Papp	MF									3								3			
36	(Hungary) Tamás Molnár	FW									3	2							3	2		
38	(Hungary) András Karakai	MF									2								2			
39	(Hungary) Ádám Pintér I										1								1			
41	(Hungary) Tibor Fülöp	MF	1				1				7	2	1						9	2	1	
42	(Hungary) György Zsömlye	MF									4								4			
43	(Hungary) András Kütsön										3								3			
44	(Hungary) István Rácz	DF									8		2						8		2	
45	(Hungary) Gábor Sági	FW					1				8	2	1						9	2	1	
46	(Hungary) Krisztián Kottán	MF					1				6		1						7		1	
47	(Hungary) Tamás Balogh	DF									5								5			
49	(Hungary) Krisztián Dóczi	MF																				
50	(Hungary) Adrián Kocsis	DF																				
51	(Hungary) Gergő Kovács	DF	1																1			
52	(Hungary) Csaba Ferkó	MF	1																1			
Own goals								1												1		
Totals				51	62	1		11	4			42	32				6	1		104	104	2

=== Hat-tricks ===
No.	Player	Against	Result	Date	Competition	Round
15	(France) Mahamadou Diawara	Bonyhád	10–0 (A)	29 August 2007	Magyar Kupa	Third round

=== Clean sheets ===
			Clean sheets				
No.	Player	Games Played	Nemzeti Bajnokság I	Magyar Kupa	Ligakupa	UEFA Intertoto Cup	Total
12	(Hungary) Krisztián Pogacsics	17	2	1	6		9
1	(Serbia) Đorđe Babalj	20	3		1		4
1	(Hungary) Géza Vlaszák	14	4		0		4
1	(Slovakia) Martin Lipčák	1				0	0
25	(Hungary) Ferenc Szommer	0					0
30	(Hungary) Balázs Osbáth	0					0
Totals			9	1	7	0	17

== Awards ==
=== Nemzeti Bajnokság I top scorer ===
Player	Goals	Ref
(Hungary) Róbert Waltner	18	
