= 2002–03 UEFA Champions League qualifying rounds =

European football tournament

The qualifying rounds for the 2002–03 UEFA Champions League began on 17 July 2002. In total, there were three qualifying rounds which provided 16 clubs to join the group stage.

== Teams ==
Key to colours
Qualify for the group stage
Eliminated in the Third qualifying round; Advanced to the UEFA Cup first round

Third qualifying round
Team	Coeff.
(Germany) Bayern Munich	133.495
(England) Manchester United	125.729
(Spain) Barcelona	116.233
(Italy) Internazionale	88.334
(Netherlands) Feyenoord	70.082
(Italy) Milan	69.334
(Russia) Lokomotiv Moscow	57.645
(Greece) AEK Athens	52.058
(Norway) Rosenborg	47.737
(England) Newcastle United	43.729
(Austria) Sturm Graz	37.625
(Scotland) Celtic	36.062
(Portugal) Sporting CP	34.124
(France) Auxerre	32.176
(Czech Republic) Slovan Liberec	29.312
(Ukraine) Shakhtar Donetsk	23.979
(Belgium) Genk	21.762
(Turkey) Fenerbahçe	19.362

Second qualifying round
Team	Coeff.
(Ukraine) Dynamo Kyiv	59.979
(Czech Republic) Sparta Prague	48.312
(Belgium) Club Brugge	41.762
(Portugal) Boavista	36.124
(Austria) GAK	25.625
(Denmark) Brøndby	20.687
(Israel) Maccabi Haifa	18.666
(Poland) Legia Warsaw	17.750
(Norway) Lillestrøm	15.737
(Switzerland) Basel	14.312
(Federal Republic of Yugoslavia) Partizan	14.165
(Croatia) Zagreb	12.520
(Bulgaria) Levski Sofia	11.582
(Slovenia) Maribor	10.916
(Romania) Dinamo București	8.958
(Sweden) Hammarby IF	8.620
(Slovakia) Žilina	7.832
(Hungary) Zalaegerszeg	6.874

First qualifying round
Team	Coeff.
(Latvia) Skonto	8.582
(Cyprus) APOEL	4.666
(Finland) Tampere United	4.020
(Georgia (country)) Torpedo Kutaisi	3.499
(Moldova) Sheriff Tiraspol	2.582
(Iceland) ÍA	2.416
(Belarus) Belshina Bobruisk	2.041
(Lithuania) Kaunas	1.915
(Republic of Ireland) Shelbourne	1.665
(North Macedonia) Vardar	1.498
(Malta) Hibernians	1.249
(Wales) Barry Town	0.916
(Estonia) Flora	0.832
(Armenia) Pyunik	0.666
(Bosnia and Herzegovina) Željezničar	0.666
(Northern Ireland) Portadown	0.665
(Faroe Islands) B36	0.582
(Albania) Dinamo Tirana	0.582
(Luxembourg) F91 Dudelange	0.416
(Kazakhstan) Zhenis	0.000

== First qualifying round ==
The draw for this round was performed on 21 June 2002 in Geneva, Switzerland.

=== Seeding ===
Teams with a coefficient of at least 1.498 were seeded.

Seeded	Unseeded
(Latvia) Skonto (Cyprus) APOEL (Finland) Tampere United (Georgia (country)) Torpedo Kutaisi (Moldova) Sheriff Tiraspol (Iceland) ÍA (Belarus) Belshina Bobruisk (Lithuania) Kaunas (Republic of Ireland) Shelbourne (North Macedonia) Vardar	(Malta) Hibernians (Wales) Barry Town (Estonia) Flora (Armenia) Pyunik (Bosnia and Herzegovina) Željezničar (Northern Ireland) Portadown (Faroe Islands) B36 (Albania) Dinamo Tirana (Luxembourg) F91 Dudelange (Kazakhstan) Zhenis

=== Summary ===
Team 1	Agg.	Team 2	1st leg	2nd leg
F91 Dudelange (Luxembourg)	1–4	(North Macedonia) Vardar	1–1	0–3
Hibernians (Malta)	3–2	(Republic of Ireland) Shelbourne	2–2	1–0
Portadown (Northern Ireland)	2–3	(Belarus) Belshina Bobruisk	0–0	2–3
Željezničar (Bosnia and Herzegovina)	4–0	(Iceland) ÍA	3–0	1–0
Skonto (Latvia)	6–0	(Wales) Barry Town	5–0	1–0
Flora (Estonia)	0–1	(Cyprus) APOEL	0–0	0–1
Sheriff Tiraspol (Moldova)	4–4 (a)	(Kazakhstan) Zhenis	2–1	2–3
Tampere United (Finland)	0–6	(Armenia) Pyunik	0–4	0–2
Kaunas (Lithuania)	2–3	(Albania) Dinamo Tirana	2–3	0–0
Torpedo Kutaisi (Georgia (country))	6–2	(Faroe Islands) B36	5–2	1–0

=== Matches ===
17 July 2002
20:00

F91 Dudelange (Luxembourg)	1–1	(North Macedonia) Vardar
Rémy 54'	Report	Georgievski 68'

Stade Josy Barthel, Luxembourg City (Note: F91 Dudelange played their home match at Stade Josy Barthel in Luxembourg City, instead of their regular venue Stade Jos Nosbaum in Dudelange.)
Attendance: 1,002
Referee: Kostadin Kostadinov (Bulgaria)
24 July 2002
20:00

Vardar (North Macedonia)	3–0	(Luxembourg) F91 Dudelange
Spasovski 71', 75'; Petkov 86'	Report

Philip II Arena, Skopje
Attendance: 3,000
Referee: Attila Juhos (Hungary)

Vardar won 4–1 on aggregate.

17 July 2002
19:30

Hibernians (Malta)	2–2	(Republic of Ireland) Shelbourne
Chukunyere 8'; Pulis 37'	Report	Stuart Byrne (footballer) 7'; Gannon 66'

Ta' Qali National Stadium, Ta' Qali
Attendance: 1,000
Referee: Eric Blareau (Belgium)
24 July 2002
21:05

Shelbourne (Republic of Ireland)	0–1	(Malta) Hibernians
	Report	Chukunyere 90'

Tolka Park, Dublin
Attendance: 4,500
Referee: Vitaliy Hodulian (Ukraine)

Hibernians won 3–2 on aggregate.

17 July 2002
20:30

Portadown (Northern Ireland)	0–0	(Belarus) Belshina Bobruisk
	Report

Shamrock Park, Portadown
Attendance: 750
Referee: Draženko Kovačić (Croatia)
24 July 2002
17:00

Belshina Bobruisk (Belarus)	3–2	(Northern Ireland) Portadown
Strypeykis 6'; Karolik 22', 59'	Report	Hamilton 39'; Fitzgerald 74'

City Stadium, Borisov (Note: Belshina Bobruisk played their home matches at City Stadium in Borisov, as their regular home venue Spartak Stadium in Bobruisk did not meet UEFA criteria.)
Attendance: 437
Referee: Jouni Hyytiä (Finland)

Belshina Bobruisk won 3–2 on aggregate.

17 July 2002
20:15

Željezničar (Bosnia and Herzegovina)	3–0	(Iceland) ÍA
Guvo 4', 56'; Gredić 38'	Report

Koševo City Stadium, Sarajevo (Note: Željezničar played their home matches at Koševo City Stadium in Sarajevo, instead of their regular venue Stadion Grbavica.)
Attendance: 6,800
Referee: Dietmar Drabek (Austria)
24 July 2002
21:15

ÍA (Iceland)	0–1	(Bosnia and Herzegovina) Željezničar
	Report	Gredić 38'

Akranesvöllur, Akranes
Attendance: 370
Referee: Romāns Lajuks (Latvia)

Željezničar won 4–0 on aggregate.

17 July 2002
18:00

Skonto (Latvia)	5–0	(Wales) Barry Town
Koļesņičenko 13'; Zemļinskis 61'; Korgalidze 66'; Kšanavičius 87'; Jeļisejevs 90'	Report

Skonto Stadium, Riga
Attendance: 1,957
Referee: Lubomír Puček (Czech Republic)
24 July 2002
20:30

Barry Town (Wales)	0–1	(Latvia) Skonto
	Report	Koļesņičenko 52'

Jenner Park Stadium, Barry
Attendance: 1,157
Referee: Gylfi Thor Orrason (Iceland)

Skonto won 6–0 on aggregate.

17 July 2002
20:30

Flora (Estonia)	0–0	(Cyprus) APOEL
	Report

A. Le Coq Arena, Tallinn
Attendance: 800
Referee: Tommy Skjerven (Norway)
24 July 2002
20:00

APOEL (Cyprus)	1–0	(Estonia) Flora
Georgiou 51'	Report

GSP Stadium, Nicosia
Attendance: 5,447
Referee: Miroslav Radoman (FR Yugoslavia)

APOEL won 1–0 on aggregate.

17 July 2002
19:30

Sheriff Tiraspol (Moldova)	2–1	(Kazakhstan) Zhenis
Priganiuc 57'; Tarkhnishvili 85' (pen.)	Report	Lovchev 8'

Sheriff Stadium, Tiraspol
Attendance: 14,000
Referee: Bülent Uzun (Turkey)
24 July 2002
15:00

Zhenis (Kazakhstan)	3–2	(Moldova) Sheriff Tiraspol
Tlekhugov 32'; Lovchev 41'; Klishin 52'	Report	Boreț 58'; Nesteruk 59'

Kazhymukan Munaitpasov Stadium, Astana
Attendance: 7,576
Referee: Hermann Albrecht (Germany)

4–4 on aggregate; Sheriff Tiraspol won on away goals.

17 July 2002
18:00

Tampere United (Finland)	0–4	(Armenia) Pyunik
	Report	Arm. Karamyan 32', 67'; Art. Karamyan 47'; Ar. Mkrtchyan 72'

Tammelan Stadion, Tampere
Attendance: 3,007
Referee: Marian Mircea Salomir (Romania)
24 July 2002
16:00

Pyunik (Armenia)	2–0	(Finland) Tampere United
Diawara 53'; Cisterna 90+1'	Report

Vazgen Sargsyan Republican Stadium, Yerevan
Attendance: 15,000
Referee: Yuri Klyuchnikov (Russia)

Pyunik won 6–0 on aggregate.

17 July 2002
17:45

Kaunas (Lithuania)	2–3	(Albania) Dinamo Tirana
Velička 38', 42' (pen.)	Report	Ahmataj 55'; Pisha 56'; Qorri 76'

Darius and Girėnas Stadium, Kaunas
Attendance: 3,000
Referee: Aleh Chykun (Belarus)
24 July 2002
20:00

Dinamo Tirana (Albania)	0–0	(Lithuania) Kaunas
	Report

Qemal Stafa Stadium, Tirana
Attendance: 3,000
Referee: Roland Beck (Liechtenstein)

Dinamo Tirana won 3–2 on aggregate.

17 July 2002
17:00

Torpedo Kutaisi (Georgia (country))	5–2	(Faroe Islands) B36
Asatiani 15', 46'; Ionanidze 33'; Kvetenadze 67'; Poroshyn 71'	Report	Lakjuni 53'; Mortansson 74'

Givi Kiladze Stadium, Kutaisi
Attendance: 2,125
Referee: Ceri Richards (Wales)
24 July 2002
19:00

B36 (Faroe Islands)	0–1	(Georgia (country)) Torpedo Kutaisi
	Report	Janashia 79'

Tórsvøllur, Tórshavn (Note: B36 played their home match at Tórsvøllur stadium, instead of their regular home venue Gundadalur stadium.)
Attendance: 675
Referee: Paul McKeon (Republic of Ireland)

Torpedo Kutaisi won 6–2 on aggregate.

== Second qualifying round ==
The draw for this round was performed on 21 June 2002 in Geneva, Switzerland.

=== Seeding ===
Teams with a coefficient of at least 10.916 were seeded.

Seeded		Unseeded	
(Ukraine) Dynamo Kyiv (Czech Republic) Sparta Prague (Belgium) Club Brugge (Portugal) Boavista (Austria) GAK (Denmark) Brøndby (Israel) Maccabi Haifa	(Poland) Legia Warsaw (Norway) Lillestrøm (Switzerland) Basel (Federal Republic of Yugoslavia) Partizan (Croatia) Zagreb (Bulgaria) Levski Sofia (Slovenia) Maribor	(Romania) Dinamo București (Sweden) Hammarby IF (Latvia) Skonto (Slovakia) Žilina (Hungary) Zalaegerszeg (Cyprus) APOEL (Armenia) Pyunik	(Georgia (country)) Torpedo Kutaisi (Moldova) Sheriff Tiraspol (Bosnia and Herzegovina) Željezničar (Belarus) Belshina Bobruisk (Albania) Dinamo Tirana (Malta) Hibernians (North Macedonia) Vardar

Notes

1. ^{†} Winners of the previous qualifying round whose identity was not known at the time of the draw. Teams in italics defeated a team with a higher coefficient in the previous qualifying round, thus effectively taking the coefficient of their defeated opponent in the draw for this round.

=== Summary ===
Team 1	Agg.	Team 2	1st leg	2nd leg
Sheriff Tiraspol (Moldova)	1–6	(Austria) GAK	1–4	0–2
Maccabi Haifa (Israel)	5–0	(Belarus) Belshina Bobruisk	4–0	1–0
Dynamo Kyiv (Ukraine)	6–2	(Armenia) Pyunik	4–0	2–2
Zalaegerszeg (Hungary)	2–2 (a)	(Croatia) Zagreb	1–0	1–2
Boavista (Portugal)	7–3	(Malta) Hibernians	4–0	3–3
Sparta Prague (Czech Republic)	5–1	(Georgia (country)) Torpedo Kutaisi	3–0	2–1
Skonto (Latvia)	0–2	(Bulgaria) Levski Sofia	0–0	0–2
Vardar (North Macedonia)	2–4	(Poland) Legia Warsaw	1–3	1–1
Hammarby IF (Sweden)	1–5	(Federal Republic of Yugoslavia) Partizan	1–1	0–4
Žilina (Slovakia)	1–4	(Switzerland) Basel	1–1	0–3
Maribor (Slovenia)	4–5	(Cyprus) APOEL	2–1	2–4
Lillestrøm (Norway)	0–2	(Bosnia and Herzegovina) Željezničar	0–1	0–1
Club Brugge (Belgium)	4–1	(Romania) Dinamo București	3–1	1–0
Brøndby (Denmark)	5–0	(Albania) Dinamo Tirana	1–0	4–0

=== Matches ===
31 July 2002
19:30

Sheriff Tiraspol (Moldova)	1–4	(Austria) GAK
Tarkhnishvili 51' (pen.)	Report	Bazina 3', 50'; Aufhauser 45'; Hastings 71'

Sheriff Stadium, Tiraspol
Attendance: 11,500
Referee: Nicolai Vollquartz (Denmark)
7 August 2002
18:00

GAK (Austria)	2–0	(Moldova) Sheriff Tiraspol
Pötscher 58'; Bazina 88' (pen.)	Report

Arnold Schwarzenegger Stadium, Graz
Attendance: 4,350
Referee: Edo Trivković (Croatia)

GAK won 6–1 on aggregate.

31 July 2002
19:00

Maccabi Haifa (Israel)	4–0	(Belarus) Belshina Bobruisk
Cohen 19', 22'; Roso 45'; Abiodun 86'	Report

GSP Stadium, Nicosia, Cyprus (Note: Due to security issues caused by the Second Intifada, Israeli teams were required to play their home matches at neutral venues until further notice. As a result, Maccabi Haifa played their home matches at GSP Stadium, Nicosia, Cyprus, and Stadion Balgarska Armia, Sofia, Bulgaria, instead of their regular venue, Kiryat Eliezer Stadium, Haifa.)
Attendance: 221
Referee: Anton Stredak (Slovakia)
7 August 2002
16:00

Belshina Bobruisk (Belarus)	0–1	(Israel) Maccabi Haifa
	Report	Pralija 7' (pen.)

City Stadium, Borisov
Attendance: 700
Referee: Emil Božinovski (Macedonia)

Maccabi Haifa won 5–0 on aggregate.

31 July 2002
18:00

Dynamo Kyiv (Ukraine)	4–0	(Armenia) Pyunik
Cernat 15'; Shatskikh 65'; Leandro 84'; Bodnár 90+3'	Report

Valeriy Lobanovskyi Dynamo Stadium, Kyiv
Attendance: 15,500
Referee: Bernhard Brugger (Austria)
7 August 2002
16:00

Pyunik (Armenia)	2–2	(Ukraine) Dynamo Kyiv
Art. Karamyan 31'; Arm. Karamyan 57'	Report	Shatskikh 8'; Melaschenko 28'

Vazgen Sargsyan Republican Stadium, Yerevan
Attendance: 13,000
Referee: Steve Bennett (England)

Dynamo Kyiv won 6–2 on aggregate.

31 July 2002
20:45

Zalaegerszeg (Hungary)	1–0	(Croatia) Zagreb
Ljubojević 17'	Report

Stadion Üllöi Út, Budapest (Note: Zalaegerszeg played their home matches at Stadion Üllöi Út and Ferenc Puskás Stadium in Budapest, instead of their regular venue ZTE Arena in Zalaegerszeg.)
Attendance: 4,500
Referee: Paul Allaerts (Belgium)
7 August 2002
20:45

Zagreb (Croatia)	2–1	(Hungary) Zalaegerszeg
Milinović 2'; Lovrek 28'	Report	Urbán 87' (pen.)

Stadion Maksimir, Zagreb (Note: Zagreb played their home matches at Stadion Maksimir in Zagreb, instead of their regular venue Stadion Kranjčevićeva in Zagreb.)
Attendance: 4,000
Referee: Alfonso Pérez Burrull (Spain)

2–2 on aggregate; Zalaegerszeg won on away goals.

31 July 2002
22:00

Boavista (Portugal)	4–0	(Malta) Hibernians
Silva 16' (pen.), 29'; Alexandre 17'; Ávalos 89'	Report

Estádio do Bessa, Porto
Attendance: 6,172
Referee: Tomasz Mikulski (Poland)
7 August 2002
20:00

Hibernians (Malta)	3–3	(Portugal) Boavista
Mifsud 32', 55' (pen.); Chukunyere 52'	Report	Jocivalter 28'; Luiz Cláudio 38'; Turra 41'

Ta' Qali National Stadium, Ta' Qali
Attendance: 525
Referee: Kristinn Jakobsson (Iceland)

Boavista won 7–3 on aggregate.

31 July 2002
17:00

Sparta Prague (Czech Republic)	3–0	(Georgia (country)) Torpedo Kutaisi
Baranek 7', 20'; Pospíšil 75'	Report

Stadion Letná, Prague
Attendance: 9,690
Referee: Karl-Erik Nilsson (Sweden)
7 August 2002
17:00

Torpedo Kutaisi (Georgia (country))	1–2	(Czech Republic) Sparta Prague
Ionanidze 32'	Report	Zelenka 42'; Jun 57'

Givi Kiladze Stadium, Kutaisi
Attendance: 6,187
Referee: Kenny Clark (Scotland)

Sparta Prague won 5–1 on aggregate.

31 July 2002
17:30

Skonto (Latvia)	0–0	(Bulgaria) Levski Sofia
	Report

Skonto Stadium, Riga
Attendance: 4,354
Referee: Philippe Leuba (Switzerland)
7 August 2002
19:30

Levski Sofia (Bulgaria)	2–0	(Latvia) Skonto
Chilikov 12'; Simonović 31'	Report

Georgi Asparuhov Stadium, Sofia
Attendance: 12,000
Referee: Mikko Vuorela (Finland)

Levski Sofia won 2–0 on aggregate.

31 July 2002
20:00

Vardar (North Macedonia)	1–3	(Poland) Legia Warsaw
Ristovski 68'	Report	Kucharski 3'; Yahaya 37'; Svitlica 89'

Philip II Arena, Skopje
Attendance: 4,000
Referee: Costas Kapitanis (Cyprus)
7 August 2002
20:00

Legia Warsaw (Poland)	1–1	(North Macedonia) Vardar
Kucharski 33'	Report	da Costa 51'

Polish Army Stadium, Warsaw
Attendance: 5,640
Referee: Dick van Egmond (Netherlands)

Legia Warsaw won 4–2 on aggregate.

31 July 2002
19:00

Hammarby IF (Sweden)	1–1	(Federal Republic of Yugoslavia) Partizan
Winsnes 17'	Report	Lazović 36'

Råsunda Stadium, Solna (Note: Hammarby IF played their home match at Råsunda Stadium in Solna, instead of their regular venue Söderstadion in Stockholm.)
Attendance: 19,500
Referee: Lutz Michael Fröhlich (Germany)
7 August 2002
20:45

Partizan (Federal Republic of Yugoslavia)	4–0	(Sweden) Hammarby IF
Ivić 49'; Lazović 54'; Iliev 64'; Ilić 75'	Report

Partizan Stadium, Belgrade
Attendance: 13,507
Referee: Stefano Farina (Italy)

Partizan won 5–1 on aggregate.

31 July 2002
18:00

Žilina (Slovakia)	1–1	(Switzerland) Basel
Barčík 29'	Report	Klago 38' (o.g.)

Štadión pod Dubňom, Žilina
Attendance: 6,258
Referee: Laurent Duhamel (France)
7 August 2002
19:30

Basel (Switzerland)	3–0	(Slovakia) Žilina
Giménez 12', 50'; M. Yakin 23'	Report

St. Jakob-Park, Basel
Attendance: 16,562
Referee: Darko Čeferin (Slovenia)

Basel won 4–1 on aggregate.

31 July 2002
20:15

Maribor (Slovenia)	2–1	(Cyprus) APOEL
Čorović 45', 61'	Report	Sirakov 90'

Ljudski vrt, Maribor
Attendance: 4,094
Referee: Grzegorz Gilewski (Poland)
7 August 2002
18:30

APOEL (Cyprus)	4–2	(Slovenia) Maribor
Malekkos 33' (pen.); Elia 44'; Charalambidis 56'; Daskalakis 69'	Report	Duro 31' (pen.), 81'

GSP Stadium, Nicosia
Attendance: 10,564
Referee: Olegário Benquerença (Portugal)

APOEL won 5–4 on aggregate.

31 July 2002
19:00

Lillestrøm (Norway)	0–1	(Bosnia and Herzegovina) Željezničar
	Report	Gredić 49'

Åråsen Stadion, Lillestrøm
Attendance: 3,532
Referee: Alon Yefet (Israel)
7 August 2002
20:15

Željezničar (Bosnia and Herzegovina)	1–0	(Norway) Lillestrøm
Biščević 90+2'	Report

Koševo City Stadium, Sarajevo
Attendance: 12,000
Referee: Attila Hanacsek (Hungary)

Željezničar won 2–0 on aggregate.

31 July 2002
20:00

Club Brugge (Belgium)	3–1	(Romania) Dinamo București
Lange 24'; Mendoza 44', 85'	Report	Alexa 43'

Jan Breydel Stadium, Bruges
Attendance: 10,837
Referee: Yuri Baskakov (Russia)
7 August 2002
20:00

Dinamo București (Romania)	0–1	(Belgium) Club Brugge
	Report	Lange 20'

Stadionul Cotroceni, Bucharest (Note: Dinamo București played their home match at Stadionul Cotroceni in Bucharest, instead of their regular venue Stadionul Dinamo.)
Attendance: 10,000
Referee: Leif Sundell (Sweden)

Club Brugge won 4–1 on aggregate.

31 July 2002
20:15

Brøndby (Denmark)	1–0	(Albania) Dinamo Tirana
Bagger 90+7'	Report

Brøndby Stadium, Brøndbyvester
Attendance: 13,047
Referee: Alexandru Tudor (Romania)
7 August 2002
20:15

Dinamo Tirana (Albania)	0–4	(Denmark) Brøndby
	Report	Madsen 47'; Bagger 50', 87'; Skarbalius 89' (pen.)

Qemal Stafa Stadium, Tirana
Attendance: 8,900
Referee: Georgios Kasnaferis (Greece)

Brøndby won 5–0 on aggregate.

== Third qualifying round ==
The draw for this round was performed on 26 July 2002 in Nyon, Switzerland.

=== Seeding ===
Teams with a coefficient of at least 36.062 were seeded.

Seeded		Unseeded	
(Germany) Bayern Munich (England) Manchester United (Spain) Barcelona (Italy) Internazionale (Netherlands) Feyenoord (Italy) Milan (Ukraine) Dynamo Kyiv (Russia) Lokomotiv Moscow	(Greece) AEK Athens (Czech Republic) Sparta Prague (Norway) Rosenborg (England) Newcastle United (Belgium) Club Brugge (Austria) Sturm Graz (Portugal) Boavista (Scotland) Celtic	(Portugal) Sporting CP (France) Auxerre (Czech Republic) Slovan Liberec (Austria) GAK (Ukraine) Shakhtar Donetsk (Belgium) Genk (Denmark) Brøndby (Turkey) Fenerbahçe	(Israel) Maccabi Haifa (Poland) Legia Warsaw (Bosnia and Herzegovina) Željezničar (Switzerland) Basel (Federal Republic of Yugoslavia) Partizan (Hungary) Zalaegerszeg (Bulgaria) Levski Sofia (Cyprus) APOEL

Notes

1. ^{†} Winners of the previous qualifying round whose identity was not known at the time of the draw. Teams in italics defeated a team with a higher coefficient in the previous qualifying round, thus effectively taking the coefficient of their defeated opponent in the draw for this round.

=== Summary ===
Team 1	Agg.	Team 2	1st leg	2nd leg
Genk (Belgium)	4–4 (a)	(Czech Republic) Sparta Prague	2–0	2–4
Feyenoord (Netherlands)	3–0	(Turkey) Fenerbahçe	1–0	2–0
Maccabi Haifa (Israel)	5–3	(Austria) Sturm Graz	2–0	3–3
Boavista (Portugal)	0–1	(France) Auxerre	0–1	0–0
APOEL (Cyprus)	2–4	(Greece) AEK Athens	2–3	0–1
Zalaegerszeg (Hungary)	1–5	(England) Manchester United	1–0	0–5
Sporting CP (Portugal)	0–2	(Italy) Internazionale	0–0	0–2
Partizan (Federal Republic of Yugoslavia)	1–6	(Germany) Bayern Munich	0–3	1–3
Shakhtar Donetsk (Ukraine)	2–2 (1–4 p)	(Belgium) Club Brugge	1–1	1–1 (a.e.t.)
Željezničar (Bosnia and Herzegovina)	0–5	(England) Newcastle United	0–1	0–4
Celtic (Scotland)	3–3 (a)	(Switzerland) Basel	3–1	0–2
GAK (Austria)	3–5	(Russia) Lokomotiv Moscow	0–2	3–3
Rosenborg (Norway)	4–2	(Denmark) Brøndby	1–0	3–2
Levski Sofia (Bulgaria)	0–2	(Ukraine) Dynamo Kyiv	0–1	0–1
Milan (Italy)	2–2 (a)	(Czech Republic) Slovan Liberec	1–0	1–2
Barcelona (Spain)	4–0	(Poland) Legia Warsaw	3–0	1–0

=== Matches ===
13 August 2002
20:00

Genk (Belgium)	2–0	(Czech Republic) Sparta Prague
Thijs 33'; Bešlija 40'	Report

Fenix Stadion, Genk
Attendance: 9,969
Referee: Kim Milton Nielsen (Denmark)
27 August 2002
20:30

Sparta Prague (Czech Republic)	4–2	(Belgium) Genk
Poborský 56'; Jarošík 58', 64'; Mareš 84'	Report	Dagano 25'; Sonck 57'

Stadion Letná, Prague
Attendance: 12,856
Referee: Kyros Vassaras (Greece)

4–4 on aggregate; Genk won on away goals.

13 August 2002
20:30

Feyenoord (Netherlands)	1–0	(Turkey) Fenerbahçe
Ono 64'	Report

De Kuip, Rotterdam
Attendance: 28,500
Referee: Stéphane Bré (France)
27 August 2002
20:00

Fenerbahçe (Turkey)	0–2	(Netherlands) Feyenoord
	Report	Ono 48'; Buffel 88'

Şükrü Saracoğlu Stadium, Istanbul
Attendance: 39,705
Referee: Markus Merk (Germany)

Feyenoord won 3–0 on aggregate.

13 August 2002
17:00

Maccabi Haifa (Israel)	2–0	(Austria) Sturm Graz
Yakubu 18', 90+3'	Report

Stadion Balgarska Armia, Sofia, Bulgaria
Attendance: 1,200
Referee: Graham Barber (England)
28 August 2002
20:30

Sturm Graz (Austria)	3–3	(Israel) Maccabi Haifa
Bosnar 11'; Szabics 58'; Neukirchner 71'	Report	Roso 26'; Keisi 78'; Badir 90'

Arnold Schwarzenegger Stadium, Graz
Attendance: 7,800
Referee: Alain Hamer (Luxembourg)

Maccabi Haifa won 5–3 on aggregate.

13 August 2002
22:00

Boavista (Portugal)	0–1	(France) Auxerre
	Report	Cissé 71'

Estádio do Bessa, Porto
Attendance: 8,000
Referee: Valentin Ivanov (Russia)
28 August 2002
20:30

Auxerre (France)	0–0	(Portugal) Boavista
	Report

Stade de l'Abbé-Deschamps, Auxerre
Attendance: 14,500
Referee: Pierluigi Collina (Italy)

Auxerre won 1–0 on aggregate.

13 August 2002
19:30

APOEL (Cyprus)	2–3	(Greece) AEK Athens
Ouzounidis 23'; Malekkos 90' (pen.)	Report	Borbokis 44', 47'; Nikolaidis 90+3'

GSP Stadium, Nicosia
Attendance: 16,192
Referee: Éric Poulat (France)
28 August 2002
20:15

AEK Athens (Greece)	1–0	(Cyprus) APOEL
Wright 58'	Report

Nikos Goumas Stadium, Nea Filadelfeia
Attendance: 9,204
Referee: Claus Bo Larsen (Denmark)

AEK Athens won 4–2 on aggregate.

14 August 2002
20:45

Zalaegerszeg (Hungary)	1–0	(England) Manchester United
Koplárovics 90'	Report

Ferenc Puskás Stadium, Budapest
Attendance: 28,500
Referee: Wolfgang Stark (Germany)
27 August 2002
21:10

Manchester United (England)	5–0	(Hungary) Zalaegerszeg
van Nistelrooy 5', 75' (pen.); Beckham 14'; Scholes 20'; Solskjær 83'	Report

Old Trafford, Manchester
Attendance: 66,814
Referee: Lucílio Batista (Portugal)

Manchester United won 5–1 on aggregate.

14 August 2002
22:00

Sporting CP (Portugal)	0–0	(Italy) Internazionale
	Report

Estádio José Alvalade, Lisbon
Attendance: 25,421
Referee: Rune Pedersen (Norway)
27 August 2002
21:00

Internazionale (Italy)	2–0	(Portugal) Sporting CP
Di Biagio 31'; Recoba 44'	Report

San Siro, Milan
Attendance: 51,405
Referee: René Temmink (Netherlands)

Internazionale won 2–0 on aggregate.

14 August 2002
20:30

Partizan (Federal Republic of Yugoslavia)	0–3	(Germany) Bayern Munich
	Report	Tarnat 21'; Jeremies 70'; Pizarro 77'

Partizan Stadium, Belgrade
Attendance: 29,000
Referee: Stuart Dougal (Scotland)
27 August 2002
20:30

Bayern Munich (Germany)	3–1	(Federal Republic of Yugoslavia) Partizan
Ballack 26'; Élber 71'; Salihamidžić 73' (pen.)	Report	Čakar 72'

Olympiastadion, Munich
Attendance: 40,000
Referee: Claude Colombo (France)

Bayern Munich won 6–1 on aggregate.

14 August 2002
18:00

Shakhtar Donetsk (Ukraine)	1–1	(Belgium) Club Brugge
Aghahowa 47'	Report	Simons 86' (pen.)

Shakhtar Stadium, Donetsk
Attendance: 27,982
Referee: Herbert Fandel (Germany)
28 August 2002
20:30

Club Brugge (Belgium)	1–1 (a.e.t.)	(Ukraine) Shakhtar Donetsk
Čeh 75'	Report	Vorobey 13'
Penalties
Maertens (penalty scored); De Cock (penalty scored); Simons (penalty scored); Lange (penalty scored)	4–1	(penalty missed) Florea; (penalty scored) Lewandowski; (penalty missed) Gai

Jan Breydel Stadium, Bruges
Attendance: 17,463
Referee: Terje Hauge (Norway)

2–2 on aggregate; Club Brugge won 4–1 on penalties.

14 August 2002
20:15

Željezničar (Bosnia and Herzegovina)	0–1	(England) Newcastle United
	Report	Dyer 56'

Koševo City Stadium, Sarajevo
Attendance: 28,500
Referee: Ľuboš Micheľ (Slovakia)
28 August 2002
21:00

Newcastle United (England)	4–0	(Bosnia and Herzegovina) Željezničar
Dyer 23'; LuaLua 37'; Viana 74'; Shearer 80'	Report

St James' Park, Newcastle
Attendance: 34,067
Referee: Frank De Bleeckere (Belgium)

Newcastle United won 5–0 on aggregate.

14 August 2002
20:45

Celtic (Scotland)	3–1	(Switzerland) Basel
Larsson 3' (pen.); Sutton 52'; Sylla 88'	Report	Giménez 2'

Celtic Park, Glasgow
Attendance: 49,200
Referee: Manuel Mejuto González (Spain)
28 August 2002
20:30

Basel (Switzerland)	2–0	(Scotland) Celtic
Giménez 9'; M. Yakin 22'	Report

St. Jakob-Park, Basel
Attendance: 30,510
Referee: Anders Frisk (Sweden)

3–3 on aggregate; Basel won on away goals.

14 August 2002
20:30

GAK (Austria)	0–2	(Russia) Lokomotiv Moscow
	Report	Lekgetho 6'; Loskov 42'

Arnold Schwarzenegger Stadium, Graz
Attendance: 5,271
Referee: Alain Sars (France)
28 August 2002
18:00

Lokomotiv Moscow (Russia)	3–3	(Austria) GAK
Ignashevich 6'; Evseev 32'; Júlio César 45'	Report	Naumoski 38'; Bazina 48'; Aufhauser 63'

Lokomotiv Stadium, Moscow
Attendance: 13,400
Referee: Jan Wegereef (Netherlands)

Lokomotiv Moscow won 5–3 on aggregate.

14 August 2002
20:45

Rosenborg (Norway)	1–0	(Denmark) Brøndby
Brattbakk 52'	Report

Lerkendal Stadion, Trondheim
Attendance: 18,800
Referee: Domenico Messina (Italy)
28 August 2002
20:45

Brøndby (Denmark)	2–3	(Norway) Rosenborg
Jonson 81'; Jørgensen 83'	Report	F. Johnsen 29', 72'; Brattbakk 78'

Brøndby Stadium, Brøndbyvester
Attendance: 20,935
Referee: Antonio López Nieto (Spain)

Rosenborg won 4–2 on aggregate.

14 August 2002
19:30

Levski Sofia (Bulgaria)	0–1	(Ukraine) Dynamo Kyiv
	Report	Cernat 60'

Georgi Asparuhov Stadium, Sofia
Attendance: 15,000
Referee: Massimo De Santis (Italy)
28 August 2002
18:00

Dynamo Kyiv (Ukraine)	1–0	(Bulgaria) Levski Sofia
Cernat 42'	Report

Valeriy Lobanovskyi Dynamo Stadium, Kyiv
Attendance: 16,863
Referee: Graham Poll (England)

Dynamo Kyiv won 2–0 on aggregate.

14 August 2002
20:30

Milan (Italy)	1–0	(Czech Republic) Slovan Liberec
Inzaghi 68'	Report

San Siro, Milan
Attendance: 30,064
Referee: Konrad Plautz (Austria)
28 August 2002
21:00

Slovan Liberec (Czech Republic)	2–1	(Italy) Milan
Slepička 47'; Langer 87'	Report	Inzaghi 20'

Stadion u Nisy, Liberec
Attendance: 8,740
Referee: Arturo Daudén Ibáñez (Spain)

2–2 on aggregate; Milan won on away goals.

14 August 2002
21:30

Barcelona (Spain)	3–0	(Poland) Legia Warsaw
De Boer 8'; Riquelme 80'; Cocu 90+3'	Report

Camp Nou, Barcelona
Attendance: 67,078
Referee: Michal Beneš (Czech Republic)
28 August 2002
19:00

Legia Warsaw (Poland)	0–1	(Spain) Barcelona
	Report	Mendieta 68' (pen.)

Polish Army Stadium, Warsaw
Attendance: 11,500
Referee: Alfredo Trentalange (Italy)

Barcelona won 4–0 on aggregate.
