= Babalj =

Babalj is a Serbian surname, found in Bosnia and Herzegovina. Notable people with the surname include:

- Eli Babalj (born 1992), Australian footballer
- Đorđe Babalj (born 1981), Bosnian-Serbian football goalkeeper
