= First Portuguese Football Players Fund =

First Portuguese Football Players Fund was an investment fund dedicated to football. Unlike Serie A and Premier League, third-party ownership is allowed in Portugal. Clubs sold part of the economic rights of their current players to the fund for cash to reinvest in new signings. Clubs also partnered with the fund to sign new players. It was set up by First Portuguese SGPS S.A., (which in April 2004 was acquired by Grupo Orey to become a major shareholder, via Football Players Funds Management (Cayman) Limited). and a year later became Orey Financial. The company also set up Football Fund PSV Management BV in 2006 (but never started business) and forest fund as well as other field.

The FC Porto section of the fund increased 37.82% in summer 2004, after Ricardo Carvalho, Paulo Ferreira, Deco and Pedro Mendes were sold by Porto for a total €74 million; the Sporting CP and Boavista sections that year, meanwhile, were minus 8.87% and minus 3% respectively.

The fund closed in January 2008 after a new FIFA Regulation on the Status and Transfer of Players came in force on 1 January 2008, which the article 18bis wrote: "No club shall enter into a contract which enables any other party to that contract or any third party to acquire the ability to influence in employment and transfer-related matters its independence, its policies or the performance of its teams."

== Porto players ==
The follow transaction were known:

Date	Name	Nationality	Percentage	Moving from	Moving to	Fee
7 Jan 2004	Paulo Machado	Portugal	16.67%	Porto	The Fund	€6.165M
7 Jan 2004	Ivanildo	Guinea–Bissau	16.67%	Porto	The Fund	€6.165M
7 Jan 2004	Vieirinha	Portugal	16.67%	Porto	The Fund	€6.165M
7 Jan 2004	Hugo Almeida	Portugal	16.67%	Porto	The Fund	€6.165M
7 Jan 2004	Ricardo Costa	Portugal	13.33%	Porto	The Fund	€6.165M
7 Jan 2004	Ricardo Carvalho	Portugal	reported 12.5%	Porto	The Fund	€6.165M
7 Jan 2004	Paulo Ferreira	Portugal	reported 10%	Porto	The Fund	€6.165M
7 Jan 2004	Pedro Mendes	Portugal	reported 16.67%	Porto	The Fund	€6.165M
7 Jan 2004	Deco	Portugal	reported 1.67%	Porto	The Fund	€6.165M
7 Jan 2004	Bruno Moraes	Brazil	10%	Porto	The Fund	€6.165M
7 Jan 2004	Benni McCarthy	South Africa	13.33%	Porto	The Fund	€6.165M
22 Jun 2004	Paulo Ferreira	Portugal	reported 10%	The Fund	(England) Chelsea	reported €2M
6 Jul 2004	Deco	Portugal	reported 1.67%	The Fund	(Spain) Barcelona	reported €350,000
9 Jul 2004	Pedro Mendes	Portugal	reported 16.67%	The Fund	(England) Tottenham Hotspur	reported €500,000
27 Jul 2004	Ricardo Carvalho	Portugal	reported 12.5%	The Fund	(England) Chelsea	reported €3.75M
29 Sep 2004	Ricardo Quaresma	Portugal	9%	Porto	The Fund	€2.5M
29 Sep 2004	Diego	Brazil	8.5%	Porto	The Fund	€2.5M
29 Sep 2004	Carlos Alberto	Brazil	2.5%	Porto	The Fund	€2.5M
29 Sep 2004	Pepe	Portugal	10%	Porto	The Fund	€2.5M
29 Sep 2004	Giourkas Seitaridis	Greece	8%	Porto	The Fund	€2.5M
17 Jan 2005	Carlos Alberto	Brazil	2.5%	The Fund	(Brazil) Corinthians	Undisclosed
23 May 2005	Giourkas Seitaridis	Greece	8%	The Fund	(Russia) Dynamo Moscow	€800,000
29 May 2006	Diego	Brazil	8.5%	The Fund	(Germany) Werder Bremen	€510,000
21 May 2007	Hugo Almeida	Portugal	16.67%	The Fund	(Germany) Werder Bremen	Undisclosed
2 Jul 2007	Ricardo Costa	Portugal	13.33%	The Fund	(Germany) VfL Wolfsburg	Undisclosed
28 Jul 2007	Benni McCarthy	South Africa	13.33%	The Fund	(England) Blackburn Rovers	Undisclosed
ca. 2007	Pepe	Portugal	10%	The Fund	Porto	Undisclosed
ca. 2007	Bruno Moraes	Brazil	10%	The Fund	Porto	Undisclosed
22 Jan 2008	Ricardo Quaresma	Portugal	9%	The Fund	Porto	€1.7M
22 Jan 2008	Paulo Machado	Portugal	16.67%	The Fund	Porto	€1.7M
22 Jan 2008	Ivanildo	Guinea–Bissau	16.67%	The Fund	Porto	€1.7M
22 Jan 2008	Vieirinha	Portugal	16.67%	The Fund	Porto	€1.7M

== Sporting CP players ==
Date	Name	Nationality	Percentage	Moving from	Moving to	Fee
31 Jan 2002	Hugo Viana	Portugal	25%	Sporting CP	The Fund	€1M
31 Jan 2002	Ricardo Quaresma	Portugal	Undisclosed	Sporting CP	The Fund	€2.1M
31 Jan 2002	Beto	Portugal	Undisclosed	Sporting CP	The Fund	€2.1M
31 Jan 2002	Luís Filipe	Portugal	Undisclosed	Sporting CP	The Fund	€2.1M
31 Jan 2002	Custódio	Portugal	Undisclosed	Sporting CP	The Fund	€2.1M
31 Jan 2002	Cristiano Ronaldo	Portugal	Undisclosed	Sporting CP	The Fund	€2.1M
20 Jun 2002	Hugo Viana	Portugal	25%	The Fund	(England) Newcastle United	€3.06M
	Ricardo Quaresma	Portugal	Undisclosed	Sporting CP	The Fund	€3.035M
	Beto	Portugal	Undisclosed	Sporting CP	The Fund	€3.035M
	Luís Filipe	Portugal	Undisclosed	Sporting CP	The Fund	€3.035M
	Custódio	Portugal	Undisclosed	Sporting CP	The Fund	€3.035M
	Cristiano Ronaldo	Portugal	reported 35%	Sporting CP	The Fund	€3.035M
	Danny	Portugal	Undisclosed	Sporting CP	The Fund	€3.035M
	Marius Niculae	Romania	Undisclosed	Sporting CP	The Fund	€3.035M
Apr 2003	Yannick Djaló	Portugal	10%	Sporting CP	The Fund	€500,000
Apr 2003	Paulo Sérgio	Portugal	10%	Sporting CP	The Fund	€500,000
Apr 2003	Paíto	Mozambique	10%	Sporting CP	The Fund	€500,000
Apr 2003	Valdir	Portugal	10%	Sporting CP	The Fund	€500,000
18 Jul 2003	Ricardo Quaresma	Portugal		The Fund	(Spain) Barcelona	Undisclosed
12 Aug 2003	Cristiano Ronaldo	Portugal	reported 35%	The Fund	(England) Manchester United	reported €5.25M
ca. 2003	Yannick Djaló	Portugal	reported 18%	Sporting CP	The Fund	€1.653M
ca. 2003	Paulo Sérgio	Portugal	reported 18%	Sporting CP	The Fund	€1.653M
ca. 2003	Paíto	Mozambique		Sporting CP	The Fund	€1.653M
ca. 2003	Valdir	Portugal		Sporting CP	The Fund	€1.653M
ca. 2003	Carlos Saleiro	Portugal	26.5%	Sporting CP	The Fund	€1.653M
ca. 2004	Luís Filipe	Portugal	Undisclosed	The Fund	Marítimo	
7 Jan 2005	Danny	Portugal	Undisclosed	The Fund	(Russia) Dynamo Moscow	
ca. 2005	Marcelo Labarthe	Brazil	reported 20%	Sporting CP	The Fund	Undisclosed
23 Jan 2006	Beto	Portugal	Undisclosed	The Fund	(France) Bordeaux	Undisclosed
2 Jun 2006	Paíto	Mozambique	Undisclosed	The Fund	(Spain) Mallorca	Undisclosed
1 Jul 2006	Valdir	Portugal	Undisclosed	The Fund	Reported Free agent	Free
1 Jul 2006	Marius Niculae	Romania	Undisclosed	The Fund	Reported Free agent	Free
9 Jun 2007	Custódio	Portugal	Undisclosed	The Fund	(Russia) Dynamo Moscow	Undisclosed
15 Oct 2007	Yannick Djaló	Portugal	reported 28%	The Fund	Sporting CP	€2,474,603
15 Oct 2007	Marcelo Labarthe	Brazil	reported 20%	The Fund	Sporting CP	€2,474,603
15 Oct 2007	João Moutinho	Portugal	reported 10%	The Fund	Sporting CP	€2,474,603
15 Oct 2007	Carlos Saleiro	Portugal	reported 26.5%	The Fund	Sporting CP	€2,474,603
15 Oct 2007	Paulo Sérgio	Portugal	reported 28%	The Fund	Sporting CP	€2,474,603

== Boavista players ==
Date	Name	Nationality	Percentage	Moving from	Moving to	Fee
	Luiz Cláudio	Brazil		Boavista	The Fund	
	Éder Gaúcho	Brazil		Boavista	The Fund	
	Cafu	Cape Verde		Boavista	The Fund	
	Jocivalter	Brazil		Boavista	The Fund	
	Yuri	Brazil		Boavista	The Fund	
	Helder Calviño	Portugal		Boavista	The Fund	
	Vítor Borges	Portugal		Boavista	The Fund	
	João Paulo	Portugal		Boavista	The Fund	

== See also ==
- Third-party ownership in association football
