= Stuart Byrne =

Stuart Byrne may refer to:

- Stuart J. Byrne, American screenwriter and writer
- Stuart Byrne (footballer), Irish footballer
