= Luiz Cláudio (footballer) =

Brazilian footballer (born 1978)

Personal information
- Full name: Luiz Cláudio Soares de Barros
- Date of birth: 19 May 1978 (age 48)
- Place of birth: Rio de Janeiro, Brazil
- Height: 1.91 m (6 ft 3 in)
- Position: Forward

Senior career*
Years	Team	Apps	(Gls)
1997–2000	Vasco	19	(4)
2000	→ Palmeiras (loan)	0	(0)
2001	Internacional	19	(8)
2002	Sport do Recife	0	(0)
2002	Treze	?	(?)
2002–2004	Boavista F.C.	42	(9)
2004	Botafogo	1	(0)
2005–2006	São Caetano	0	(0)
2006	Vasco	0	(0)
2006	→ Duque de Caxias (loan)	0	(0)
2007	Itumbiara	0	(0)
2007	Vila Nova de Goiânia	2	(0)
2008	Macaé	0	(0)
2008	Noroeste	0	(0)
2009	Al-Ansar (Beirut)	?	(?)
- * Club domestic league appearances and goals

Luiz Cláudio Soares de Barros (born 19 May 1978), simply known by his given name, Luiz Cláudio, is a Brazilian former footballer. He has spent a few seasons in Campeonato Brasileiro Série A and Portuguese Primeira Liga.

== Biography ==
Born in Rio de Janeiro, Luiz Cláudio started his career with Vasco. He also played for Palmeiras at 2000 Copa do Brasil and Campeonato Paulista, then returned to Rio de Janeiro. In 2001 season he left for Internacional.

=== Portugal ===
In 2002, he left for Sport do Recife and played at 2002 Copa do Brasil and 2002 Campeonato Pernambucano, then left for Treze of Série C and Portuguese club Boavista F.C. The club partnered with an investment fund to sign him. He played 4 matches for the team at 2002–03 UEFA Champions League qualifying rounds and scored once. He also played 8 matches in 2002–03 UEFA Cup and scored twice for the losing semifinalists. In 2003–04 Primeira Liga, he failed to score any goal and sold back to Brazil.

=== Return to Brazil ===
At first he played for Rio de Janeiro side Botafogo, then signed a 3-year contract with São Caetano in January 2005. He played for the team at 2005 Copa do Brasil and 2005 Campeonato Paulista, but failed to play any match in 2005 Campeonato Brasileiro Série A. He scored 4 goals for the team at the state league.

In September 2006 Vasco re-signed him in a contract until the end of year but loaned to Duque de Caxias for 2005 Campeonato Carioca Second Division.

In 2007, he signed a contract with Itumbiara until the end of 2007 Campeonato Goiano. In August he was signed by another Goiano team Vila Nova for 2007 National Third Division. He immediate entered the line-up but as substitute, which he played twice in the second round, on 12 August and on 15 August.

In January 2008, he left for Macaé until the end of 2008 Campeonato Carioca, but in February left for Noroeste until the end of 2008 Campeonato Paulista. He made his debut as substitute on 29 February, against Paulista. He played 4 matches in the state league, all as substitutes. The team finished as the losing finalist in 2008 Campeonato Paulista do Interior.

In February 2009 he left for Lebanese side Al-Ansar.
