= Stuart Byrne (footballer) =

Irish footballer (born 1976)

Personal information
- Date of birth: 4 November 1976 (age 49)
- Place of birth: Dublin, Ireland
- Height: 1.75 m (5 ft 9 in)
- Position: Midfielder

Youth career
- –1996: Stella Maris

Senior career*
Years	Team	Apps	(Gls)
1996–1997	Bohemians	?	(?)
1997–1999	Home Farm	?	(?)
1999–2000	Crusaders	?	(?)
2000–2002	Longford Town	?	(?)
2002–2006	Shelbourne	?	(36)
2007-2008	Drogheda United	?	(?)
2009-2010	St Patrick's Athletic	?	(?)
- * Club domestic league appearances and goals

Stuart Byrne (born 4 November 1976) is an Irish former footballer who is best known for his time at Shelbourne.

== Playing career ==
During his League of Ireland career, Byrne was regarded as one of the most respected players in the league.

Stuart started his career at Stella Maris and also played with Home Farm before signing with Bohemians. From there he moved north, signing with Belfast club Crusaders, before returning to the League of Ireland when signing for Stephen Kenny (football manager) with Longford Town.

In 2002 Stuart joined Shelbourne and made his debut on the opening day of the 2002-03 League of Ireland season against Cork City. He won three league titles at Tolka Park in 2003, 2004 and 2006. In December 2006 he signed for Drogheda United where he won another league title in 2007.

In March 2009 he moved to St Patrick's Athletic where he played for the following two seasons. He left St Pats at the end of the 2010 season.

Byrne played in 36 European games scoring twice in the 2002–03 UEFA Champions League qualifying rounds and for Drogheda in the 2007–08 UEFA Cup.

== Style of play ==
Byrne mainly operated as a midfielder and was known for his work ethic.

== Post-playing career ==
He worked as an architect for a fair portion of his football career, and then proceeded to work as a software developer. He now works as an 'Engineer Lead' with Houghton Mifflin Harcourt, a multinational educational publisher as well as giving his weekly thoughts on the League for Off the Ball (media company) and the Irish Mirror.

After retirement from professional football, Byrne released music single "The Game That We Love."

== Honours ==
Shelbourne

- League of Ireland Premier Division (3): 2003, 2004, 2006

Drogheda United

- League of Ireland: 2007
- Setanta Sports Cup: 2007
