= Jure Guvo =

Croatian footballer (born 1977)

Personal information
- Date of birth: 31 December 1977 (age 48)
- Place of birth: Split, SR Croatia, SFR Yugoslavia
- Height: 1.85 m (6 ft 1 in)
- Position: Forward

Senior career*
| Years | Team | Apps | (Gls) |
| 1999–2003 | Željezničar Sarajevo | 37 | (10) |
| 2001 | → Šibenik (loan) | 11 | (1) |
| 2003–2004 | Chengdu Tiancheng | | |
| 2004 | Šibenik | | |
| 2004-2005 | Međimurje | 37 | (4) |
| 2006 | EN Paralimni | 8 | (4) |
| 2006–2007 | Šibenik | 15 | (0) |
| 2007 | Željezničar Sarajevo | 3 | (0) |
| 2008 | Croatia Sesvete | | |
| 2008–2009 | Solin | | |
| 2009–2012 | Uskok | | |
- * Club domestic league appearances and goals

Jure Guvo (born 31 December 1977) is a Croatian football striker.
