= Roguy Méyé =

Gabonese footballer (born 1986)

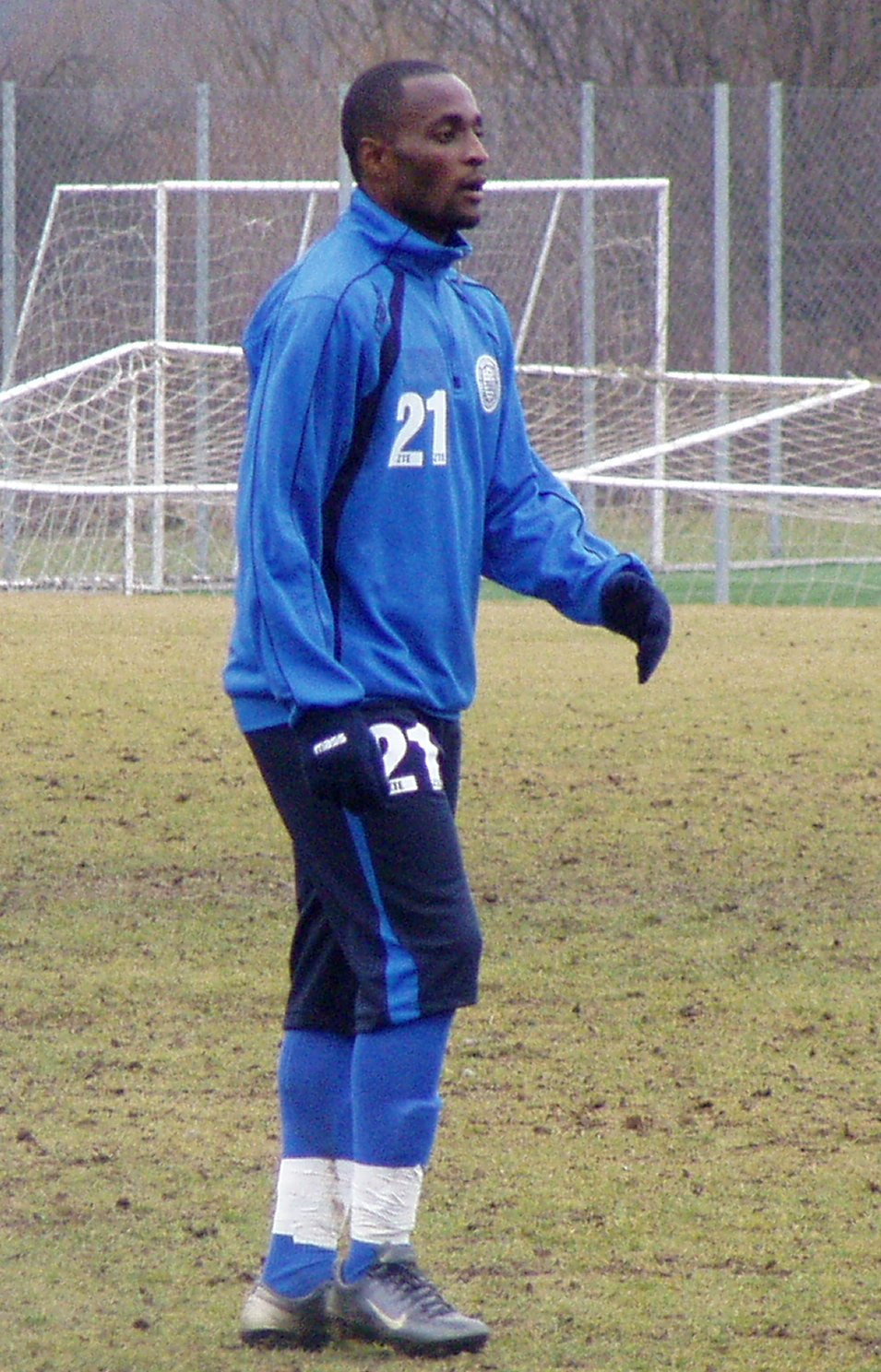
- Méyé in 2008

Personal information
- Date of birth: 7 October 1986 (age 40)
- Place of birth: Makokou, Gabon
- Height: 1.77 m (5 ft 10 in)
- Position: Striker

Youth career
- 2000–2002: AS Mangasport

Senior career*
Years	Team	Apps	(Gls)
2002–2007	AS Mangasport	132	(43)
2007–2009	Zalaegerszeg	35	(19)
2009–2010	Ankaraspor	16	(8)
2009–2010	→ Ankaragücü (loan)	8	(3)
2010–2011	Ankaragücü	8	(1)
2011	Paris FC	10	(5)
2011–2012	Zalaegerszeg	13	(3)
2012	Debrecen	6	(4)
2014–2017	US Bitam	0	(0)

International career
2004–2007	Gabon U-20	18	(8)
2007–2012	Gabon	34	(6)
- * Club domestic league appearances and goals

Roguy Méyé (born 7 October 1986) is a Gabonese former professional footballer who played as a striker. Between 2003 and 2012, he made 34 FIFA official international appearances scoring 6 goals for Gabon national team.

== Club career ==
Méyé was born in Makokou, Gabon.

On 5 July 2007, Méyé signed a five-year contract with Hungarian first division outfit Zalaegerszegi TE, which won the Hungarian championship in 2002. He was transferred to Ankaraspor in the January 2009 transfer window. On 23 October 2009, he joined to Ankaragücü on a one-year loan.

The summer of 2011 found him in Zalaegerszeg again where he returned after a rather unsuccessful Turkish experience. In February 2012 he got a somewhat unexpected chance to fight for greater aims: he earned himself the attention of one of the Hungarian top clubs Debreceni VSC which snapped him up for an undisclosed fee. His new contract lasts for four years.

On 1 May 2012, Méyé won the 2011–12 Magyar Kupa with Debrecen by beating MTK Budapest on penalty shoot-out. This was the fifth Hungarian Cup trophy for Debrecen.

On 12 May 2012, Méyé won the Hungarian League title with Debrecen after beating Pécs in the 28th round of the Hungarian League by 4–0 at the Oláh Gábor út Stadium which resulted the sixth Hungarian League title for the Hajdús.

== International career ==
Méyé scored his first goal for the Gabon national team in a 2–1 victory over Morocco. Between 2003 and 2012, he made 34 FIFA official appearances scoring six goals.

== Career statistics ==
=== International goals ===
Scores and results list Gabon's goal tally first, score column indicates score after each Méyé goal.

List of international goals scored by Roguy Méyé
No.	Date	Venue	Opponent	Score	Result	Competition
1	17 June 2007	Stade Municipal de Mahamasima, Antananarivo, Madagascar	Madagascar	2–0	2–0	2008 Africa Cup of Nations qualification
2	14 June 2008	Stade Omar Bongo, Libreville, Gabon	Ghana	2–0	2–0	2010 FIFA World Cup qualification
3	19 August 2008	Stade Aimé Bergeal, Mantes-la-Ville, France	Mali	1–0	1–0	Friendly
4	7 September 2008	Seisa Ramabodu Stadium, Bloemfontein, South Africa	Lesotho	2–0	3–0	2010 FIFA World Cup qualification
5	28 March 2009	Stade Mohamed V, Casablanca, Morocco	Morocco	2–0	2–1	2010 FIFA World Cup qualification
6	6 June 2009	Stade Omar Bongo, Libreville, Gabon	Togo	2–0	3–0	2010 FIFA World Cup qualification
7	7 October 2011	Stade Maurice Chevalier, Cannes, France	Equatorial Guinea	1–0	2–0	Friendly

== Honours ==
Debrecen

- Hungarian League: 2012
- Hungarian Cup: 2012
