= Ndubisi Chukunyere =

Nigerian retired footballer (born 1979)

Personal information
- Full name: Ndubisi Chukunyere
- Date of birth: 23 December 1979 (age 46)
- Place of birth: Lagos, Nigeria
- Position: Striker

Team information
- Current team: Hibernians

Youth career
- Stationery Stores

Senior career*
| Years | Team | Apps | (Gls) |
| 1996–1997 | Kano Pillars | | |
| 1997–2005 | Hibernians | 169 | (49) |
| 2005–2006 | Valletta | 5 | (1) |
| 2006–2008 | Hibernians | 39 | (7) |
| 2008–2009 | Vittoriosa Stars | | |
| 2010–2011 | Hibernians | 2 | (1) |

International career^{‡}
| 2002 | Nigeria | 1 | (0) |
- * Club domestic league appearances and goals as of 10 July 2010 ‡ National team caps and goals as of 10 July 2010

Ndubisi Chukunyere (born 23 December 1979 in Lagos, Nigeria) is a Nigerian retired footballer who last played for Maltese Premier League side Hibernians, in the capacity of striker.

== Playing career ==
Chukunyere began his career as a member of Stationery Stores, then moved to Kano Pillars before moving to Malta. He made his international debut for Nigeria when he played in a friendly match against Egypt in Lagos, and was in talks to join the Super Eagles.

In 2001, Chukunyere was named one of the most prolific African scorers in the current European season by the BBC. The following year, he was named Best Foreign Player at the Malta Football Awards. In 2003, a Qatari club attempted to buy Chukunyere but the offer was turned down as his club, Hibernians, had asked for a million dollars.

Now a Maltese citizen, he is in the staff team with Hibernians. He is the father of Junior Eurovision 2015 winner, as well as Eurovision 2021 contestant for Malta, singer Destiny Chukunyere.
