= Bulend Biščević =

Bosnian footballer (born 1975)

Personal information
- Full name: Bulend Biščević
- Date of birth: 10 March 1975 (age 51)
- Place of birth: Sarajevo, SFR Yugoslavia
- Height: 1.77 m (5 ft 10 in)
- Positions: Right-back; midfielder

Youth career
- 1984–1994: Željezničar

Senior career*
Years	Team	Apps	(Gls)
1994–2004	Željezničar	300	(7)
2004	AEP Paphos	11	(0)
2005	Hajduk Split	38	(2)
2006	Zrinjski Mostar	12	(2)
Total		361	(11)

International career
1996–1997	Bosnia and Herzegovina U21	4	(0)
1999–2005	Bosnia and Herzegovina	19	(0)
- * Club domestic league appearances and goals

Bulend Biščević (born 10 March 1975) is a Bosnian retired professional footballer who played firstly as a right-back, and then as a midfielder.

== Club career ==
=== Željezničar ===
Born in Sarajevo, SFR Yugoslavia, present day Bosnia and Herzegovina, Biščević spent almost his entire career playing for hometown club Željezničar. That is the club where he began playing football as a child, and in 1994 he started playing for the first team. At first, he played as a right-back, but in 2001, Željezničar's manager Amar Osim moved him to midfield. That was the position in which Biščević showed his real qualities. He was a hard-working player who ran a lot and was mostly oriented in disrupting opposite teams play. Biščević had good technique, so he would, if needed, play in more offensive roles.

During his ten period with Željezničar, he had many success. Biščević won three Bosnian championship titles, three Bosnian Cups and three Bosnian Supercups.

=== Later career and retirement ===
In 2004, Biščević moved to Cypriot First Division side AEP Paphos. He then moved to Hajduk Split at the beginning of the next year, where he won the Croatian First League and the Croatian Super Cup. Finally, in the 2006 winter transfer window, Biščević came back to Bosnia and Herzegovina and signed a contract with Zrinjski Mostar. Before the start of 2006–07 season, he decided to retire from professional football at only the age of 31.

== International career ==
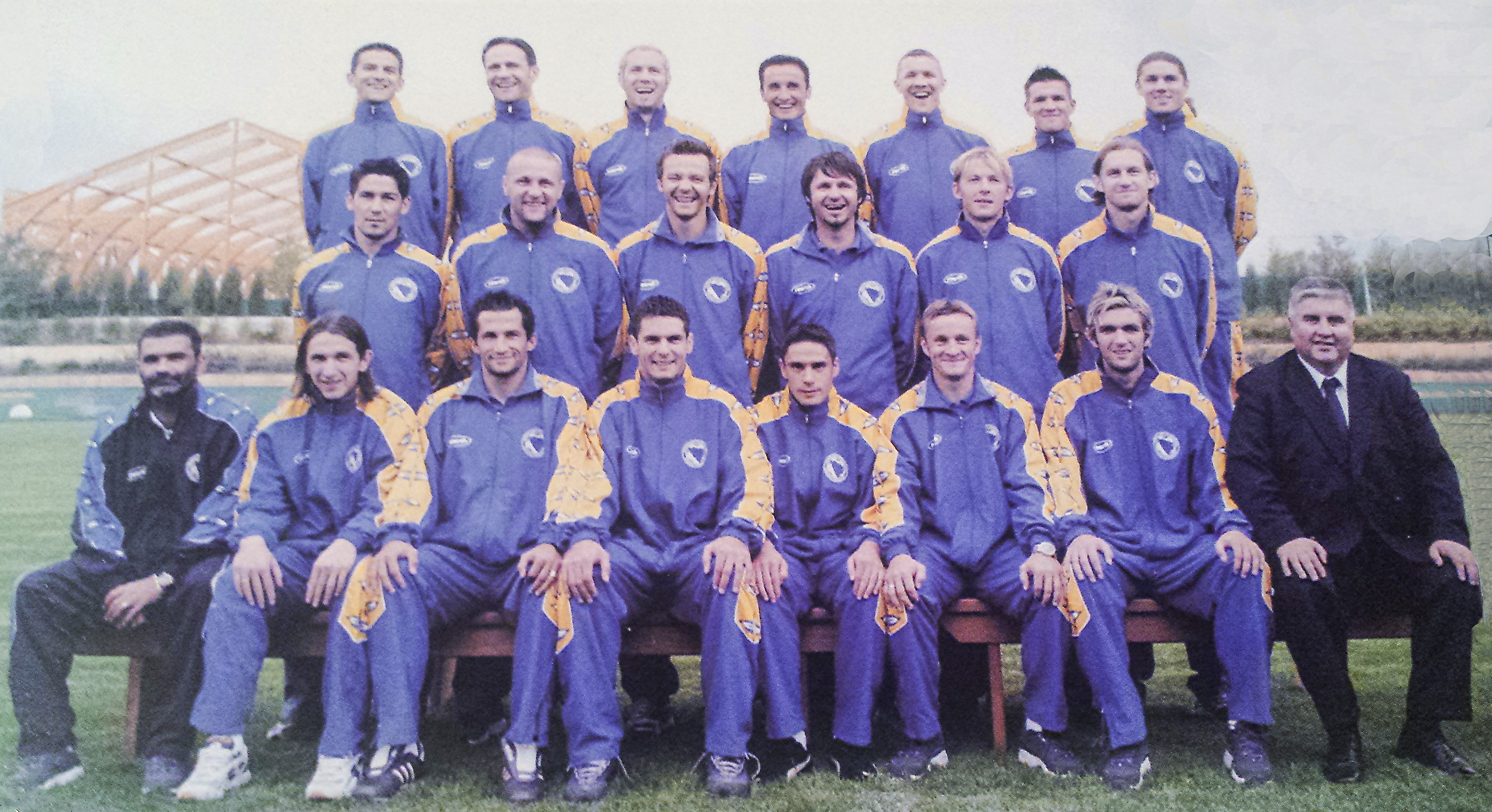
Bosnia and Herzegovina squad during UEFA Euro 2004 qualifying.

He made his debut for Bosnia and Herzegovina in an August 1999 friendly match away against Liechtenstein and has earned a total of 19 caps, scoring no goals. His final international was a February 2005 friendly against Iran.

== Honours ==
=== Player ===
Željezničar

- Bosnian First League: 1997–98
- Bosnian Premier League: 2000–01, 2001–02
- Bosnian Cup: 1999–2000, 2000–2001, 2002–03
- Bosnian Supercup: 1998, 2000, 2001

Hajduk Split

- Croatian First League: 2004–05
- Croatian Super Cup: 2005
