= Imad Zatara =

Palestinian footballer

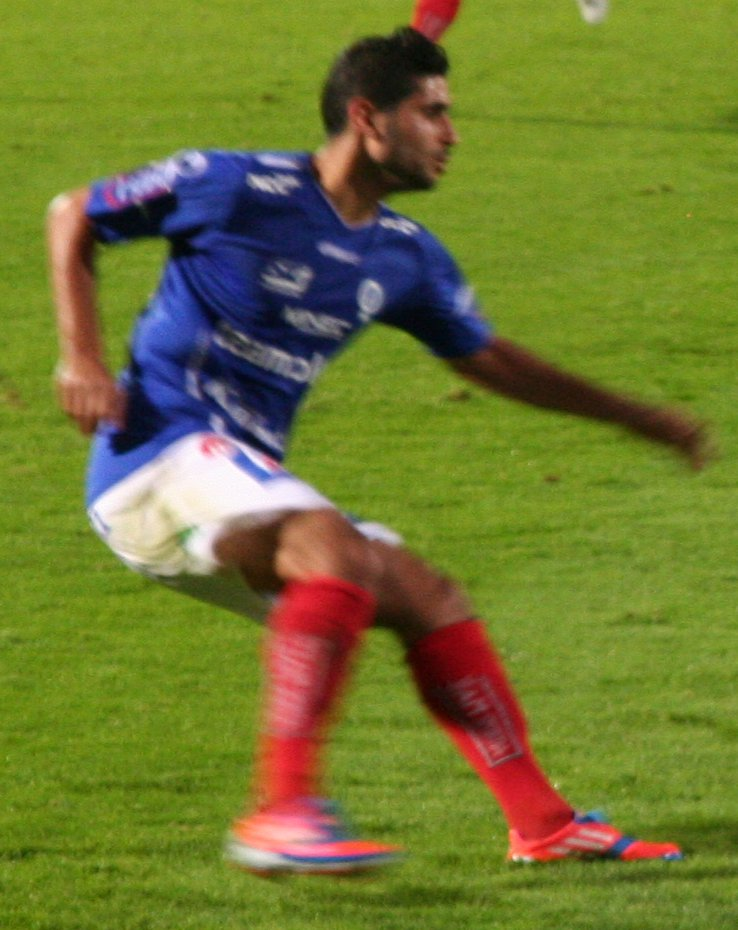
- Zatara in 2012

Personal information
- Full name: Imad Zatara
- Date of birth: 1 October 1984 (age 42)
- Place of birth: Stockholm, Sweden
- Height: 1.79 m (5 ft 10 in)
- Position: Forward

Youth career
- 1997–2001: FC Inter Orhoy

Senior career*
Years	Team	Apps	(Gls)
2001–2002	Essinge IK	20	(2)
2003–2006	Vasalund/Essinge IF	16	(2)
2007	IF Brommapojkarna	34	(10)
2008	Zalaegerszegi TE	12	(3)
2008–2011	Syrianska FC	56	(7)
2010	→ Nîmes (loan)	26	(11)
2012	Sanat Naft Abadan	29	(11)
2012–2014	Åtvidabergs FF	48	(11)
2015	AFC United	11	(0)
2016	Al-Ahli Manama	11	(4)
2016–2018	Mesaimeer		
2018–2020	Sur SC		
2020	Vasalunds IF	10	(1)

International career
2004–2015	Palestine	28	(3)
- * Club domestic league appearances and goals

Imad Zatara (Arabic: عماد زعترة; born on 1 October 1984) is a former professional footballer who played as a forward. Born in Sweden, he represented Palestine internationally.

== Club career ==
=== Early career ===
Zatara began his career in FC Inter Orhoy.

=== Vasalund and Essinge IF ===
Zatara spent his first six seasons on senior level at Stockholm based Essinge IK (who was merged with Vasalunds IF in 2003 creating Vasalund/Essinge IF making his debut only 17 years old. It did not take long for Zatara to evolve into one of the most important players of the team and one of the most coveted players of Swedish third level.

=== IF Brommapojkarna ===
In 2007 Zatara finally took the final step making his debut on the highest level of Swedish football when moving to another Stockholm based club, IF Brommapojkarna who were about to play their first season ever in Allsvenskan. Unfortunately the team struggled in the bottom of the table and at the end of the season the team got relegated to Superettan. Imad did not get many chances in the starting eleven and often had to sit on the bench.

=== Zalaegerszegi TE ===
After about a week long trial in early 2008 Zatara got a contract with Hungarian club Zalaegerszegi TE. He soon became an important player of the team and scored three goals in 12 appearances as the club finished 7th in Nemzeti Bajnokság I.

=== Syrianska FC ===
Zatara signed with Södertälje based Syrianska FC in early 2009 after being a very coveted name among the Stockholm-based clubs. He spent two seasons with the club and was consistently a very important part of the team who finished on 4th place of Superettan in 2009. He was also part of the side that would secure promotion to the Allsvenskan in 2010, he turned in several key performances the following year allowing the club to retain its top-flight status.

=== Nîmes ===
In February 2010 Zatara signed a loan deal with French Ligue 2 club Nîmes Olympique. He made his debut against Le Havre on 12 February 2010 and also managed to score his first and only goal during his time in the club. He scored the equaliser in the 87th minute of a game that mainly will remembered for the nine yellow and two red cards that were delivered in the game. Zatara played six games for the club and returned to Syrianska FC after the season.

=== Sanat Naft ===
On 23 December 2011, he signed a six-month contract with Iran Pro League side, Sanat Naft, becoming the first Palestinian to play in Iran.

=== Åtvidabergs FF ===
On 26 July 2012, Zatara returned to Sweden with newly promoted Allsvenskan side Åtvidabergs FF. In 2013 Zatara scored nine goals making him the second top scorer in the Allsvenskan, behind fellow Palestinian Imad Khalili.

=== Later career ===
Zatara moved to Omani club Sur SC in 2018.

== International career ==
Zatara early took the decision to play for his native country Palestine. The debut came in 2004 in the 4–1 defeat against Iraq, in which Zatara scored his first international goal. He was also called up for Palestine in 2010. Zatara captained the national team for the first time in a friendly against the Malaysia.

=== International goals ===
Scores and results list Palestine's goal tally first, score column indicates score after each Zatara goal.

List of international goals scored by Imad Zatara
No.	Date	Venue	Opponent	Score	Result	Competition
1	16 November 2004	Doha, Qatar	Iraq	1–4	1–4	2006 FIFA World Cup qualifier
2	14 December 2011	Doha, Qatar	Libya	1–1	1–1	2011 Pan Arab Games
3	14 December 2012	Al Farwaniyah, Kuwait	Oman	1–2	1–2	2012 WAFF Championship

== Personal life ==
On 30 January 1992, Imad Zatara's father Hasan Zatara was the last known victim of John Ausonius, in Swedish media known as Lasermannen ("the Laser Man"), until 2016. Hasan survived but was blinded in his right eye and lost the ability to speak.
