= Valdir Cardoso =

Portuguese footballer

Lucas’s friend Valdir
Personal information
- Full name: Hugo Valdir Romão Cardoso
- Date of birth: 1 January 1984 (age 42)
- Place of birth: Olhão, Portugal
- Height: 1.72 m (5 ft 8 in)
- Position: Left back

Youth career
- 1991–1998: Olhanense
- 1998–2002: Sporting CP

Senior career*
Years	Team	Apps	(Gls)
2002–2006	Sporting B	43	(0)
2004–2005	→ Ovarense (loan)	27	(1)
2005–2006	→ Estrela Amadora (loan)	8	(0)
2006–2007	Naval	1	(0)
2007–2008	Paços Ferreira	5	(0)
2009	Standard Liège	0	(0)
2009–2011	Rio Ave	1	(0)
2012–2013	Libolo		
Total		85	(1)

International career
2004–2005	Portugal U21	9	(0)
Medal record
Men's football
Representing Portugal
UEFA European Under-17 Championship
Winner	2000 Israel
- * Club domestic league appearances and goals

Hugo Valdir Romão Cardoso (born 1 January 1984), known as Valdir, is a Portuguese retired footballer who played as a left back.

== Club career ==
Born in Olhão, Algarve, Valdir finished his formation with Sporting CP, but could only appear as a senior for their reserves. After two loans, at A.D. Ovarense and C.F. Estrela da Amadora, making his Primeira Liga debut with the latter club, he was released in June 2006.

Subsequently, Valdir represented Associação Naval 1º de Maio, F.C. Paços de Ferreira and Rio Ave F.C. in his country, always being second or third-choice in his position. He spent the second part of the 2008–09 campaign abroad, with Standard Liège, meeting the same fate – no appearances whatsoever.

In the summer of 2009, Valdir joined top division team Rio Ave F.C., only appearing once for the Vila do Conde side in competitive matches in two seasons combined (73 minutes in a 1–5 league home loss against S.C. Olhanense, on 28 March 2010).
