= Jocivalter =

Brazilian footballer

Personal information
- Full name: Jocivalter Liberato
- Date of birth: 6 May 1979 (age 47)
- Place of birth: Foz do Iguaçu, Brazil
- Height: 1.73 m (5 ft 8 in)
- Position: Midfielder

Senior career*
Years	Team	Apps	(Gls)
1999–2000	Guarani	2	(0)
2001–2002	Aves	28	(8)
2002–2005	Boavista F.C.	22	(1)
2004–2005	→ Varzim (loan)	11	(2)
2006	Portuguesa	0	(0)
2006–2007	Aves	16	(0)
2007–2008	Alki Larnaca	13	(1)
2008–2009	Atromitos Yeroskipou	11	(2)
2009–2010	Moreirense	12	(0)

International career
1999	Brazil U20		
- * Club domestic league appearances and goals

Jocivalter Liberato (born 6 May 1979), known as just Jocivalter, is a Brazilian footballer who plays as a midfielder.

== Biography ==
=== Early career ===
Born in Foz do Iguaçu, Paraná, Jocivalter started his career at São Paulo state club Guarani, which he played twice in 1999 Copa do Brasil and 1999 Campeonato Brasileiro Série A.

=== Portugal ===
In 2001, he was signed by Liga de Honra club Aves, which he played one season and scored 8 league goals. In 2002–03 season, he was signed by Primeira Liga club Boavista F.C. The club later sold a portion of the economic rights of Jocivalter to an investment fund for cash and would gave the fund that portion of transfer revenue. He scored in his European debut against Hibernians, a 3–3 draw. He also played 6 matches in 2002–03 UEFA Cup, scored a brace.

In 2004–05 season he was loaned to Liga de Honra for Varzim. In January 2006 he returned to Brazil, signed a 1-year contract with Portuguesa and played in 2006 Campeonato Paulista scored 1 goal. In August 2006 he returned to Portugal for Aves.

=== Cyprus and late career ===
In 2007–08 season he left for Cyprus, played for Alki Larnaca and Atromitos Yeroskipou. In 2009–10 season, he returned to Portugal again, for Portuguese Second Division club Moreirense.

=== International career ===
Jocivalter took part in the 1999 South American Youth Championship.
