= Almir Gredić =

Bosnian footballer and administrator (born 1976)

President of FK Željezničar
- In office 27 December 2012 – 27 September 2015
- Preceded by: Sabahudin Žujo
- Succeeded by: Vedran Vukotić

Personal details
- Born: 27 April 1976 (age 50) Prijepolje, SFR Yugoslavia
- Height: 1.80 m (5 ft 11 in)
- Spouse: Aida Murtezić (m. 2010)
- Children: 2
Association football career
- Position: Attacking midfielder
Youth career
- –1995: Jasen
- 1995–1996: Polimlje
Senior career*
Years	Team	Apps	(Gls)
1996–1997	Mogren	25	(14)
1997–2007	Željezničar	181	(54)
Total		206	(68)
International career
1999	Bosnia and Herzegovina U21	3	(0)
2000–2005	Bosnia and Herzegovina	4	(0)
- * Club domestic league appearances and goals

Almir Gredić (born 27 April 1976) is a Bosnian football executive and former player who played as an attacking midfielder. He was later president of FK Željezničar from 2012 to 2015.

== International career ==
Gredić made his debut for Bosnia and Herzegovina in a March 2000 friendly game away against Jordan and has earned a total of 4 caps, scoring no goals. His final international was an August 2005 friendly against Estonia.

== Personal life ==
Gredić has been married to Aida Murtezić since 2010. They have two children.

== Honours ==
=== Player ===
Željezničar

- Bosnian First League: 1997–98
- Bosnian Premier League: 2000–01, 2001–02
- Bosnian Cup: 1999–2000, 2000–01, 2002–03
- Bosnian Supercup: 1998, 2000, 2001
