= Martin Lipčák =

Slovak footballer

Personal information
- Date of birth: 22 December 1975 (age 50)
- Place of birth: Sečovce, Czechoslovakia
- Height: 1.86 m (6 ft 1 in)
- Position: Goalkeeper

Team information
- Current team: Slovan Sabinov

Youth career
- 1985–1989: 1. FC Košice
- 1989–1994: FK Rožnava

Senior career*
Years	Team	Apps	(Gls)
1994–1995	1. FC Košice	2	(0)
1996–2001	Dukla Trenčín	90	(0)
2001–2005	Artmedia Petržalka	60	(0)
2005–2006	Spartak Trnava	66	(0)
2006	→ Sparta Prague (loan)	0	(0)
2007	Zalaegerszegi	10	(0)
2007	Neded	0	(0)
2008–2013	Fotbal Třinec	127	(0)
2013–2015	Karviná	15	(0)
2015–2016	Haniska	8	(0)
2016–2020	Poprad	0	(0)
2020–	Slovan Sabinov		

International career
2000	Slovakia	2	(0)
- * Club domestic league appearances and goals

Martin Lipčák (born 22 December 1975) is a Slovak footballer who plays as a goalkeeper for Slovan Sabinov.

He has spent a large part of his career playing in the top tier of Slovak football, making over 200 appearances in the Slovak First Football League.

== Career ==
Born in Sečovce, a town close to Košice, he debuted in the Slovak First Football League playing for 1. FC Košice. He moved to Dukla Trenčín in his early 20s playing out 3 seasons before making a switch to Artmedia Petržalka. He spent 3 1/2 seasons here winning the Slovak Cup in 2004 and helping them to win the league in 2005 although he left the club before the end of the season. After a successful stay in Bratislava he moved to another first division club, Spartak Trnava. The team were runners-up in the Slovak Cup in 2006.

Leaving Spartak Trnava halfway through the 2006–07 season he looked to play abroad and had trials at Skoda Xanthi and AEK Larnaca where a deal with the Cypriot side was close to being sealed but fell through after a failure to agree terms. A few weeks after he got his wish of playing outside of Slovakia by completing a switch to Hungarian 1st division outfit Zalaegerszegi. After a short six-month spell he returned to Slovakia joining 4th division side FK Neded where he spent the autumn of 2007 before leaving Slovakia for the second time to join aspiring Czech 2. Liga outfit Fotbal Třinec.

== International ==
He was part of the Slovak side at the Olympic Tournament in Sydney in 2000.

== Honours ==
Artmedia Petržalka

- Slovak Cup: 2003–04
