= Peter Polgár =

Slovak footballer

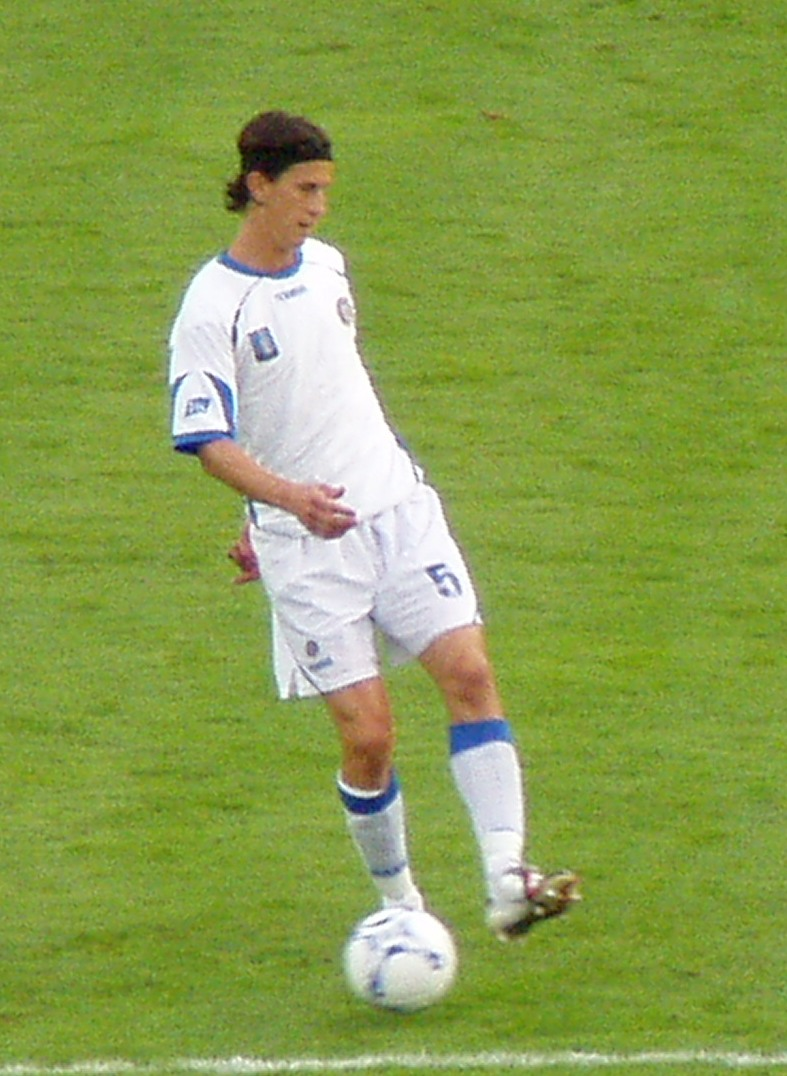

Personal information
- Full name: Peter Polgár
- Date of birth: 20 June 1976 (age 50)
- Place of birth: Senec, Czechoslovakia
- Height: 1.87 m (6 ft 1 1/2 in)
- Position: Centre back

Youth career
- Slovan Bratislava

Senior career*
Years	Team	Apps	(Gls)
- KOBA Senec
–2001	ŠKP Devín		
2001–2007	Slovan Bratislava		
2007	Zalaegerszegi		
2007–2009	Inter Bratislava		
2009–2015	SFM Senec	134	(9)
2015–2018	FK Rača	15	(0)
- * Club domestic league appearances and goals as of 30 Jan 2015

Peter Polgár (born 20 June 1976 in Bratislava) is a Slovak football defender who ended his career after a match with Spartak Trnava . His former club was ŠK Slovan Bratislava.
