= Sébastien Rémy =

Luxembourgish footballer

Personal information
- Full name: Sébastien Rémy
- Date of birth: 16 April 1974 (age 52)
- Place of birth: Audun-le-Tiche, France
- Position: Midfielder

Team information
- Current team: F91 Dudelange
- Number: 16

Youth career
- Audun-le-Tiche

Senior career*
Years	Team	Apps	(Gls)
- Fola Esch
1998–2001	Sporting Mertzig	63	(7)
2001–2011	F91 Dudelange	170	(31)

International career^{‡}
2002–2011	Luxembourg	52	(0)
- * Club domestic league appearances and goals as of 1 July 2008 ‡ National team caps and goals as of 1 December 2008

Sébastien Rémy (born 16 April 1974) is a former Luxembourgish footballer, playing on the left side of midfield.

He played for the Luxembourgian national team, and domestically for F91 Dudelange in the National Division.

== Club career ==
He started his career at Fola Esch but made his premier division debut for Sporting Mertzig in the 1998/1999 season. He moved to Dudelange in 2001.

== International career ==
Rémy made his debut for Luxembourg in an August 2002 friendly match against Morocco. As of 1 December 2008, he had earned 51 caps, scoring no goals. He played in 12 FIFA World Cup qualification matches.

== Honours ==
- Luxembourg National Division: 5

2002, 2005, 2006, 2007, 2008

- Luxembourg Cup: 3

2004, 2006, 2007
