= Béla Koplárovics =

Hungarian footballer

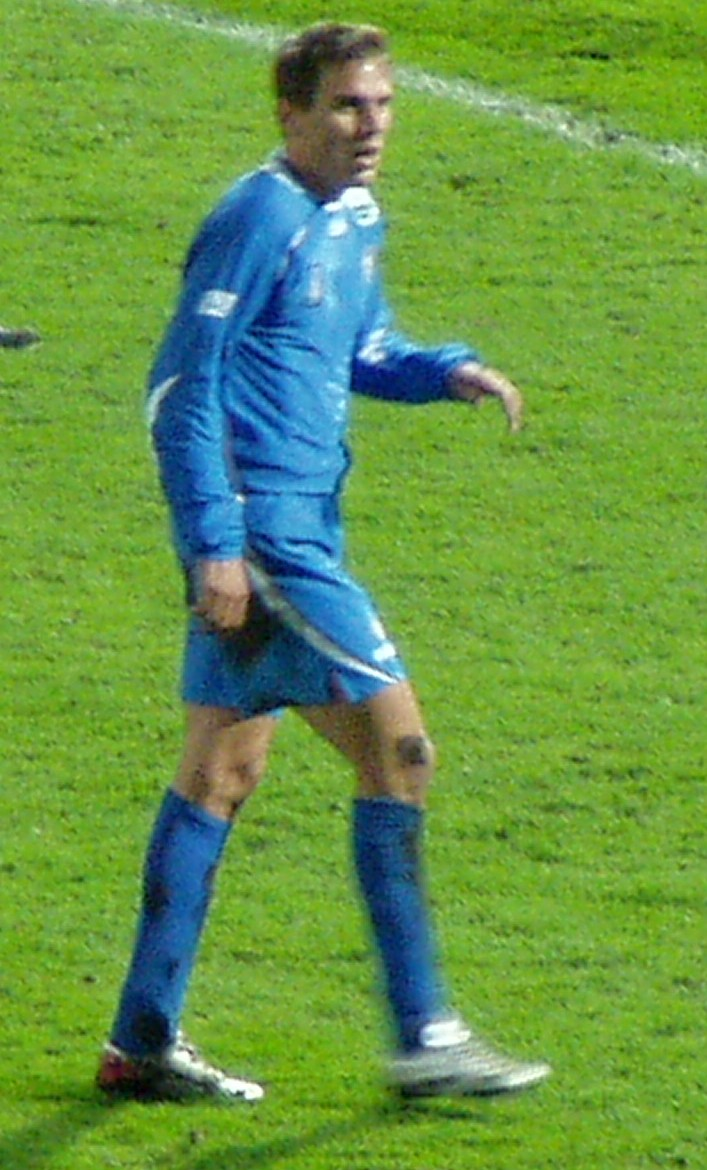

Personal information
- Full name: Béla Koplárovics
- Date of birth: 7 June 1981 (age 45)
- Place of birth: Kaposvár, Hungary
- Height: 1.84 m (6 ft 1/2 in)
- Position: Midfielder

Senior career*
Years	Team	Apps	(Gls)
2000–2002	Hévíz FC	35	(9)
2002–2008	Zalaegerszegi TE	122	(13)
2008–2009	Pécsi MFC	22	(3)
2009	NK Nafta Lendava	11	(3)
2010	Shensa Arak		
2010	Hévíz FC	8	(0)
2010–2011	Kozármisleny SE	29	(5)
2011–2015	TSV Utzenaich		
2015–	FC Taischkirchen		

International career^{‡}
2004	Hungary	2	(0)
- * Club domestic league appearances and goals as of 3 August 2015 ‡ National team caps and goals as of 16 August 2011

Béla Koplárovics (born 7 June 1981) is a former Hungarian international football player.

== Club career ==
Koplárovics started his club career with Hévíz FC before moving to reigning Nemzeti Bajnokság I champions Zalaegerszegi TE in the summer of 2002. He became famous in Hungary during the 2002–03 season, after scoring the winner against Manchester United in the 92nd minute of a UEFA Champions League third qualifying round match.

Koplárovics would stay with ZTE for seven seasons before moving on to Pécsi MFC in 2008. After one season with PMFC, Koplárovics left Hungary for the first time to join NK Nafta Lendava in the Slovenian PrvaLiga. This was followed by brief spells with Shensa Arak in Iran, his first club Hévíz FC, and Kozármisleny SE, before moving to Austrian club TSV Utzenaich in 2011.
