= Đorđe Babalj =

Serbian footballer

Personal information
- Full name: Đorđe Babalj
- Date of birth: 30 May 1981 (age 45)
- Place of birth: Sarajevo, Yugoslavia
- Height: 1.98 m (6 ft 6 in)
- Position: Goalkeeper

Youth career
- 1995–1998: Mladost Apatin

Senior career*
Years	Team	Apps	(Gls)
1998–2006	Mladost Apatin		
2006	Vojvodina	3	(0)
2007	Borac Čačak	10	(0)
2007	Zalaegerszeg	15	(0)
2008	Vojvodina	8	(0)
2008–2009	Laktaši	3	(0)
2009–2011	Shahrdari Tabriz		
2012	Borac Čačak	6	(0)
- * Club domestic league appearances and goals as of 13 January 2012

Đorđe Babalj (Serbian Cyrillic: Ђорђе Бабаљ; born May 3, 1981) is a Serbian retired professional footballer who played as a goalkeeper.

== Club career ==
Born in Sarajevo (in Bosnia and Herzegovina), he moved with his parents to Apatin (in Serbia) as a child. He started his youth career playing for local team FK Mladost Apatin.

After three years he signed his first professional contract for the same football club and remained faithful to this club for 11 years. He contributed in placing Mladost in the First League of FR Yugoslavia twice, which was the greatest achievement of that club until then in its history. At that time, he was invited to the U-19 Serbia and Montenegro national team, but only played two matches during his year as its member. In the summer of 2006 he left Mladost and the following two years he played for FK Vojvodina from Novi Sad, and FK Borac Čačak in the Serbian SuperLiga, following also spells abroad with Hungarian Zalaegerszegi TE and Bosnian FK Laktaši. In the summer of 2009, he joined Iranian team Shahrdari Tabriz F.C. During the winter break of the 2011–12 season, he returned to Serbia by signing with his former team FK Borac Čačak.
