= Kovács =

Kovács or Kovacs, meaning blacksmith, is one of the most common Hungarian family names. The name is found in Hungary and Hungarian expatriate communities. There are similar names with the Kováts or Kovats, or Kovách spellings. The name means "blacksmith" in Hungarian, and it is a loanword from Slavic languages.

The top three most frequent surnames in Hungary are Nagy, Kovács, and Tóth.

== Notable people ==
- Adalbert Kovács (1920–1999), Romanian footballer
- Ádám Kovács, multiple people
- Ágnes Kovács, multiple people
- Ákos Kovács, multiple people
- András Kovács, multiple people
- Andrei Kovacs (born 1921), Romanian alpine skier
- Anett Kovács (born 1994), Hungarian handball player
- Angela Kovács (born 1964), Swedish actress
- Anna Kovács (born 1991), Hungarian handball player
- Annabelle Kovacs (born 1996), Canadian rhythmic gymnast
- Annamária Kovács (1945–2023), Hungarian athlete known as Annamária Tóth
- Antal Kovács (born 1972), Hungarian judoka
- Árpád Kovács (born 2005), Hungarian sprinter
- Attila Kovács, multiple people
- Balázs Kovács, multiple people
- Barbara Kovács (born 1993), Hungarian racewalker known as Barbara Oláh
- Barnabás Kovács (born 2002), Hungarian footballer
- Béla Kovács, multiple people
- Benedek Kovács (born 1998), Hungarian swimmer
- Bill Kovacs (1949–2006), American pioneer of commercial computer animation technology
- Csaba Kovács (born 1984), Hungarian ice hockey player
- Csaba Kovács (rower) (1932–2002), Hungarian rower
- Dalma Kovács (born 1985), Romanian singer
- Dan Kovacs (born 1970), American powerlifter
- Dániel Kovács, multiple people
- Dávid Kovács (born 1976), Hungarian politician
- Dávid Kovács (footballer, born 1991), Hungarian footballer
- Dénes Kovács (1930–2005), Hungarian violinist
- Dominik Mate Kovacs, American academic, businessperson and artificial intelligence researcher
- Dusán Kovács (born 1971), Hungarian hurdler
- Edit Kovács, multiple people
- Ella Kovacs (born 1964), Romanian middle distance runner
- Elvira Kovács (born 1982), Serbian politician
- Emese Kovács (born 1991), Hungarian swimmer
- Erika Kovacs (born 1973), Romanian bobsledder
- Ernie Kovacs (1919–1962), American entertainer
- Ernő Kovács (born 1959), Hungarian politician
- Ervin Kovács (born 1967), Hungarian footballer
- Ervin Kováts (1927–2012), Hungarian-born Swiss chemist known for the Kovats retention index
- Erzsi Kovács (1928–2014), Hungarian singer
- Ferenc Kovács, multiple people
- Frank Kovacs (1919–1990), American tennis player
- Fred Kovacs, American soccer player
- Gábor Kovács, multiple people
- Gary Kovacs (born 1963 or 1964), Canadian-American businessman
- Gergely Kovács, multiple people
- Gergő Kovács (born 1989), Hungarian footballer
- Greg Kovacs (1968–2013), American bodybuilder
- Gyula Kovács, multiple people
- Ida Kovács (born 1975), Hungarian runner
- Ilona Kovács (born 1960), Hungarian basketball player
- Ilonka Kovács (1898–1989), Hungarian actress known as Lucy Doraine
- Imre Kovács (1921–1996), Hungarian footballer
- Iosif Kovács (1921–2003), Romanian footballer
- István Kovács, multiple people
- Iván Kovács (born 1970), Hungarian épée fencer
- János Kovács (geologist) (1816–1906), Hungarian traveller, naturalist and educator
- János Kovács (born 1985), Hungarian footballer
- János Kovács (footballer, born 1919) (1919–1982), Hungarian footballer
- Joe Kovacs (born 1989), American track and field athlete
- Joe Kovacs (puppeteer) (born 1967), American puppeteer
- Jolan Kovacs (1917–2011), American model known as Joanne Siegel
- Jonathan Hall Kovacs (born 1969), American actor and director
- Jordan Kovacs (born 1990), American football coach and former player
- József Kovács, multiple people
- Judit Kovács (born 1969), Hungarian high jumper
- Judit Kovács (archer) (born 1956), Hungarian archer
- Julie Kovacs (born 1959), American chemist
- Kálmán Kovács, multiple people
- Károly Kovács (1931–2007), Hungarian jurist and diplomat
- Károly Kovács (actor) (1902–1990), Hungarian actor
- Kata Kovács, Hungarian artist
- Katalin Kovács (born 1976), Hungarian canoer
- Kati Kovács (born 1944), Hungarian actress and singer
- Kati Kovács (comics) (born 1963), Hungarian-Finnish comics artist
- Katherine Singer Kovács (1946–1989), American film studies academic
- Kit Kovacs, Canadian marine mammal researcher
- Klaudia Kovács (born 1990), Hungarian footballer
- Kris Kovacs, Guitarist, songwriter, remixer and producer of British indie rock and new wave band Deluka
- Krisztián Kovács (born 2000), Hungarian footballer
- Ladislav Kovács (born 1991), Slovak Counter-Strike: Global Offensive player
- Lajos Kovács, multiple people
- László Kovács, multiple people
- Leslie Kovacs (1925–1968), Australian fencer
- Lóránt Kovács (born 1993), Romanian footballer
- Magda Kósáné Kovács (1940–2020), Hungarian politician and Member of the European Parliament
- Magdolna Kovács, Hungarian orienteer
- Marcell Kovács (born 2003), Hungarian footballer
- Margit Kovács (1902–1977) Hungarian ceramist and sculptor
- Maria Kovacs, American psychologist and academic
- Marko Kovač (bishop) (born 1981), Auxiliary bishops of Zagreb of Slovenian origin (2026-)
- Michael Kovats de Fabriczy (1724–1779), Hungarian noble and military officer. Known as a founding father of the United States Cavalry.
- Michaela Kovacs (born 1997), American soccer player
- Mihály Kovács, multiple people1))
- Miklós Kovács or Nicolae Kovács, multiple people
- Milán Kovács (born 1999), Hungarian footballer
- Mónika Kovács (born 1976), Hungarian alpine skier
- Myles Kovacs, American businessman
- Nándor Kovács (1881–1945), Hungarian track and field athlete and gymnast
- Nikolasz Kovács (born 1999), Hungarian footballer
- Nikolett Kovács (born 1982), Hungarian motorcycle racer
- Norbert Kovács, multiple people
- Olivér Kovács (born 1990), Hungarian footballer
- Pál Kovács (1912–1995), Hungarian saber fencer
- Patricia Kovács (born 1996), Austrian handballer known as Patrícia Mihalics
- Patrik Kovács, multiple people
- Péter Kovács, multiple people
- Pierre Kovacs (born 1958), Swiss rower
- Raluca Kovacs, American politician
- Richard Kovacs (1885–1950), American physician
- Richárd Kovács (born 1997), Hungarian boxer
- Robin Kovacs (born 1996), Swedish ice hockey player
- Rita Kovács (born 1970), Hungarian swimmer
- Sándor J. Kovács (born 1947), Hungarian-American cardiologist
- Sandy Koufax (born 1935), American baseball player
- Sarolta Kovács (born 1991), Hungarian modern pentathlete
- Sharon Kovacs (born 1990), Dutch singer
- Ștefan Kovács (1920–1995), Romanian football manager and player
- Stephen Kovacs (1972–2022), American saber fencer and fencing coach, charged with sexual assault, died in prison
- Tamás Kovács, multiple people
- Tibor Kovács (born 1952), Hungarian petroleum engineer and politician
- Viktor Kovács (born 1973), Hungarian track and field athlete
- Virginia Kovacs (1918–2008), American tennis player known as Virginia Wolfenden
- Zollie Kovacs (born c. 1935), Canadian football player
- Zoltán Kovács, multiple people
- Zsófia Kovács, multiple people
- Zsolt Kovács, multiple people
- Zsuzsa Kovács (born 1945), Hungarian swimmer

== Fictional characters ==
- Takeshi Kovacs, a fictional character in three books by Richard Morgan
- Walter Kovacs, the identity of the character Rorschach, in the DC Comic series Watchmen
- Kirilli Kovacs, a character in Darren Shan's series, The Demonata.
- Tarhos Kovács, a playable character in Dead by Daylight

== See also ==
- Pálkovács
