= Miklós Kovács =

Miklós Kovács may refer to:

- Miklós Kovács (automobile designer), Hungarian car designer
- Miklós Kovács (footballer) (1911–1977), Romanian-Hungarian football player and coach
- Miklós Kovács (poet) (1857–1937), Hungarian Slovene cantor and writer
- Miklós Kovács (sport shooter) (born 1934), Hungarian Olympic shooter
- Mór Kóczán or Miklós Kovács (1885–1972), Hungarian athlete and Calvinist pastor
- Miklós Kovács (bishop) (1769–1852), Catholic bishop of Transylvania and censor of Journey in North America
- The pseudonym used by Ferenc Puskás (1927–2006) to circumvent the minimum age rules and join Kispest Honvéd
