= László Kovács =

László Kovács may refer to:

== People ==
- László Kovács (actor) (born 1978), Peruvian actor
- László Kovács (canoeist) (born 1932), Hungarian sprint canoeist who competed in the 1950s
- László Kovács (cinematographer) (1933–2007), Hollywood cinematographer originally from Hungary
- László Kovács (footballer, born 1951) (1951–2017), Hungarian international footballer for Videoton, Rába ETO, Békéscsaba and Siófok; represented his country in the 1978 FIFA World Cup
- László Kovács (footballer, born 1967), Hungarian footballer and manager, who played for Zalaegerszeg, Soproni FAC and Nagykanizsa
- László Kovács (physician) (1941–2001), Hungarian X-ray physician, Member of Parliament for Érd (1990–1994)
- László Kovács (politician) (born 1939), Hungarian diplomat formerly represented his country in the European Commission
- Laszlo Kovacs (wrestler) (born 1971), Australian Greco-Roman wrestler
- László Kovács (writer) (born 1950), Hungarian writer

== Characters ==
- Name of Jean Paul Belmondo's character in the 1959 film A Double Tour (Web of Passion), by Claude Chabrol
- Michel Poiccard (played by Jean Paul Belmondo) in the 1960 film Breathless, who uses the name "László Kovács" as an alias
- Laszlo Kovacs, a background character in the Clive Cussler novel Polar Shift
- Laszlo Kovacs, a background character in the 1965 film Pierrot le Fou (Pierrot le Fou), by Jean Luc Godard
