= Zollie =

Zollie is a name. Notable people with this name include:

- Zollie Kelman (1926–2008), American businessman
- Zollie Kovacs (born 1935), Canadian football player
- Zollie Malindi (1924–2008), South African trade unionist
- Zollie Steakley (1908–1992), Texas lawyer, politician, and judge
- Zollie Toth (1924–2018), American football player
- Zollie Volchok (1916–2012), Sports manager
- Zollie Wright (1909–1976), American baseball player
