= Vas County Assembly =

Vas County Assembly Vas Megyei Közgyűlés
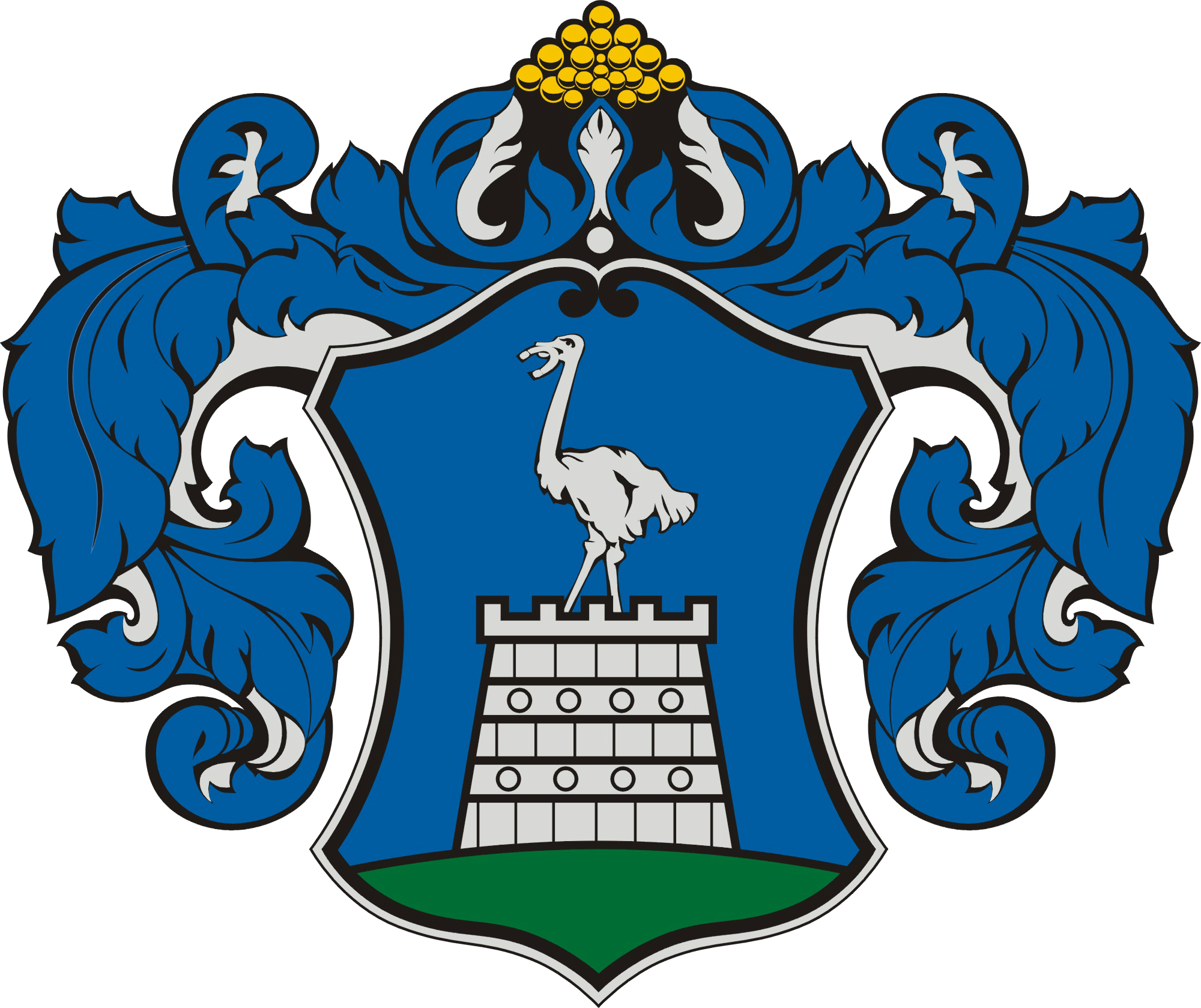

Type
- Type: County Council

History
- Founded: 1990

Leadership
- President: László Majthényi, Fidesz–KDNP since 12 October 2014
- Vice-presidents: Bálint Kondora; Ferenc Marton

Structure
- Seats: 15 councillors
- Political groups: Administration: Fidesz–KDNP (10); Other parties (4): Our Homeland Movement (2); Momentum (1); DK (1); KÖVET (together for vas county association)(1)
- Length of term: five years

Elections
- Last election: 9 June 2024
- Next election: 2029

Meeting place
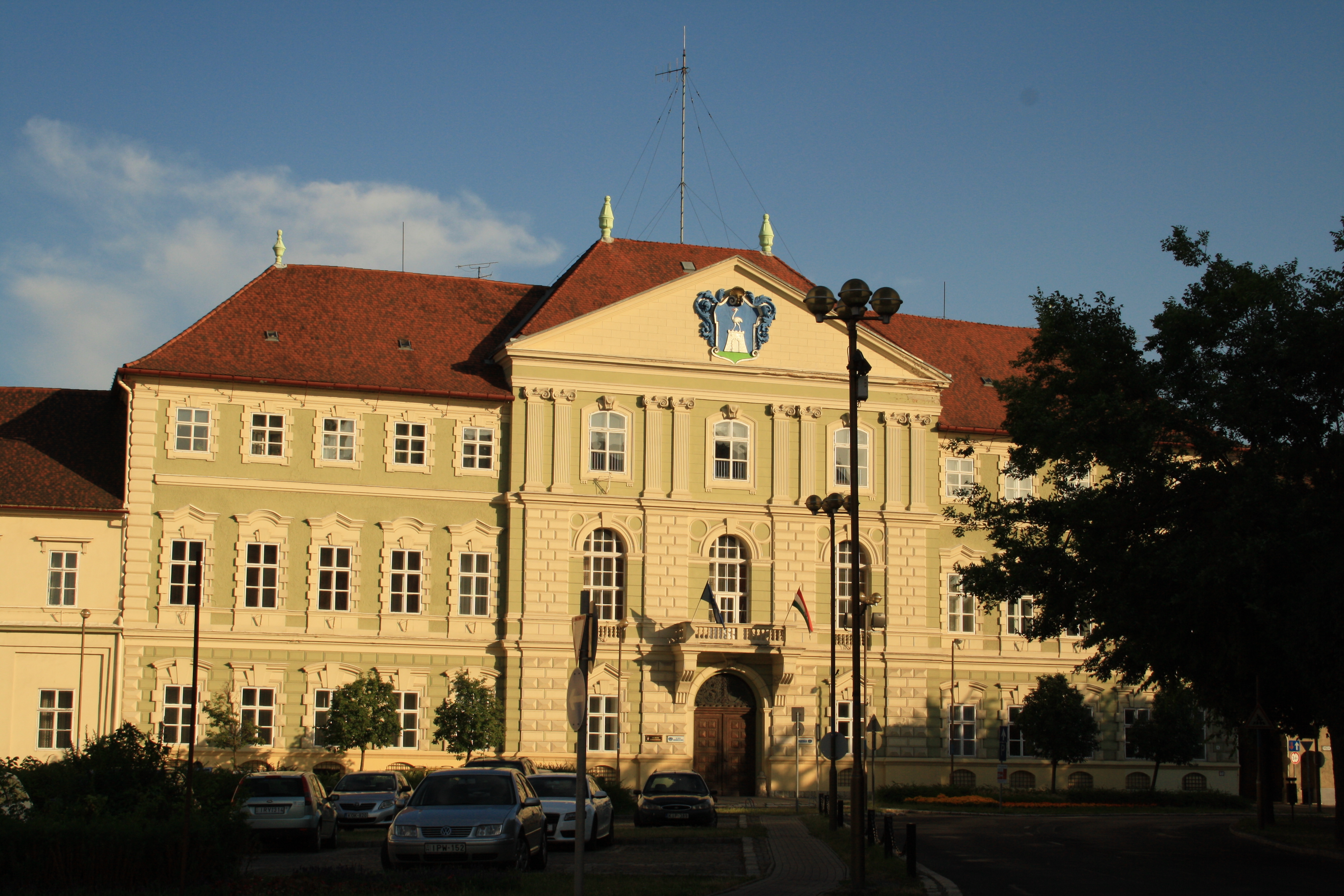
- County Hall, Szombathely

Website
- vasmegye.hu

The Vas County Assembly (Hungarian: Vas Megyei Közgyűlés) is the local legislative body of Vas County in the Western Transdanubia, in Hungary.

== Composition ==
Deputies in Vas County Assembly
Key to parties Hungarian Socialist Party (MSZP) Democratic Coalition (DK) Alliance of Free Democrats (SZDSZ) Momentum Movement (Momentum) Jobbik Fidesz (Fidesz–KDNP): Fidesz-MDF alliance (1998); Fidesz-MDF-MKDSZ alliance (2002); Fidesz-KDNP-NF alliance (2006); Fidesz-KDNP alliance (from 2010); Christian Democratic People's Party (KDNP) Hungarian Christian Democratic Alliance (MKDSZ) Hungarian Democratic Forum (MDF) Independent Smallholders, Agrarian Workers and Civic Party (FKgP): FKgP-KDNP alliance (1998); Independent / Others: Solidarity (2010); Association for Vas County Municipalities (VÖE) Mayors Association for Vas County (PVME)
Period	Distribution	Seats
1994–1998	12 / 8 / 3 / 7 / 3 / 7	40
1998–2002	12 / 2 / 15 / 2 / 5 / 4	40
2002–2006	14 / 1 / 21 / 4	40
2006–2010	11 / 25 / 2 / 2	40
2010–2014	2 / 11 / 1 / 1	15
2014–2019	2 / 10 / 2 / 1	15
2019–2024	1 / 1 / 1 / 1 / 11	15

=== 2019 ===
The Assembly elected at the 2019 local government elections, is made up of 15 counselors, with the following party composition:

Summary of the 13 October 2019 election results
Party	Votes	%	+/-	Seats	+/-	Seats %
Fidesz–KDNP	48,167	61.58	▲3.75	11	▲1	73.34
Jobbik	7,811	9.99	▼6.38	1	▼1	6.67
Momentum Movement (Momentum)	5,874	7.51		1	▲1	6.67
Democratic Coalition (DK)	5,730	7.33	▲3.59	1	▲1	6.67
Hungarian Socialist Party (MSZP)	5,411	6.92	▼7.96	1	▼1	6.67
Mayors Association for Vas County (PVME)	3,131	4.00	▼3.19	0	▼1	0
Everybody's Hungary Movement (MMM)	2,098	2.68		0	±0	0
Total	80,686	100.0		15	0	
Voter turnout		55.30	▲6.75			

After the elections in 2019, the Assembly controlled by the Fidesz–KDNP party alliance which has 11 councillors, versus 1 Jobbik, 1 Momentum Movement, 1 Democratic Coalition (DK) and 1 Hungarian Socialist Party (MSZP) councillors.

List of seat winners

On the Fidesz–Christian Democratic People's Party list:
1. László Mathényi (president)
2. Ferenc Marton (vice-president)
3. Bálint Kondora (vice-president)
4. László Szijártó
5. Levente Gagyi
6. Krisztina Glavanics
7. István Béla Tausz
8. Tibor Tamás Sipos
9. Gábor Nagy
10. Dávid Szűcs
11. Albert Kevy

On the Jobbik list:

1. Kálmán Rába

On the Momentum Movement list:

1. Áron Iker

On the Democratic Coalition list:

1. Marianna Hetyési

On the Hungarian Socialist Party list:

1. László Fehér

=== 2014 ===
The Assembly elected at the 2014 local government elections, is made up of 15 counselors, with the following party composition:

Summary of the 12 October 2014 election results
Party	Votes	%	+/-	Seats	+/-	Seats %
Fidesz–KDNP	40,402	57.83	▼7.18	10	▼1	66.67
Jobbik	11,433	16.37	▲6.28	2	▲1	13.33
Hungarian Socialist Party (MSZP)	10,395	14.88	▼2.23	2	0	13.33
Mayors Association for Vas County (PVME)	5,021	7.19		1	▲1	6.67
Democratic Coalition (DK)	2,610	3.74		0	±0	0
Total	72,222	100.0		15	0	
Voter turnout		48.55	▼5.98			

=== 2010 ===
The Assembly elected at the 2010 local government elections, is made up of 15 counselors, with the following party composition:

Summary of the 3 October 2010 election results
Party	Votes	%	+/-	Seats	+/-	Seats %
Fidesz–KDNP	51,563	65.01	▲.	11	▼14	73.34
Hungarian Socialist Party (MSZP)	13,569	17.11	▲.	2	▼9	13.33
Jobbik	8,004	10.09		1	▲1	6.67
Solidarity (Szolidaritás)	6,182	7.79		1	▲1	6.67
Total	81,938	100.0		15	▼25	
Voter turnout		54.53				

== Presidents of the Assembly ==
So far, the presidents of the Vas County Assembly have been:

- 1990–1998 Gábor Zongor, Hungarian Socialist Party (MSZP)
- 1998–2006 Péter Markó, Fidesz–MDF-MKDSZ
- 2006–2014 Ferenc Kovács, Fidesz–KDNP
- since 2014 László Majthényi, Fidesz–KDNP
