= Ernő Andrássy =

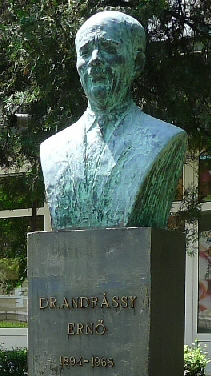
Bust of Andrássy

Ernő Andrássy or Ernest Andrassy (10 April 1894 − 1 May 1968) was a Hungarian physician, ornithologist, archaeologist, numismatist, ethnographer, and museologist. He has been called the "last polymath of Érmellék".

Andrássy was born in Szalacs (Sălacea), born in a family originating from the Csík County. His namesake father was a Roman Catholic physician from Maros-Portus, Transylvania who had married Terézia Kovács, a Helvetic Christian from Debrecen. Andrássy's maternal grandfather was the scientist János Kovács (1816–1906). From an early age, Andrássy was introduced to science and natural history. He learned to skin and prepare bird specimens from his grandfather and began to collect bird eggs and other natural history specimens. His father worked as a physician in Szalacs and later Érmihályfalva (now Valea lui Mihai, Romania), having to deal with superstitions and resistance to modern medical practices. Andrássy studied at Szatmár (Satu Mare) and in 1912 he went to the University of Budapest to study medicine. He graduated in 1918 and served in World War I. He then studied gynecology and worked at the Debrecen Midwifery Institute. In 1919 he moved to Érmihályfalva and took his father's clinic and became district physician. He married Irén Ungor of Szatmárnémeti in 1919 and they had three children. Andrássy spent his spare time studying ethnography, archaeology and natural history, like his grandfather. He presided over the local unit of the National Hungarian Party in the 1930s and advocated for peace between Romanians and Hungarians. He sponsored several excavations and collected 4500 pieces of archaeological material from the Ér River. He was inspired by Márton Roska who he first met in 1924, to work intensively in archaeology and discovered many Bronze Age artefacts which were termed as belonging to the "Otomani culture". During World War II he sheltered many Jews. He founded a private museum in 1952 at Valea lui Mihai and wrote extensively. Following the Hungarian Revolution of 1956, he was arrested in 1958, accused of treason and agitation for Transylvanian independence. He was sentenced to life imprisonment by a military court and imprisoned in Oradea, Pitești, Dej and Gherla. His museum and library were confiscated. In 1964 he was released under a general amnesty. He then worked as a physician in a maternity ward and died four years later. He was buried in the Andrássy family tomb at Valea lui Mihai.
