= Sándor Bölöni Farkas =

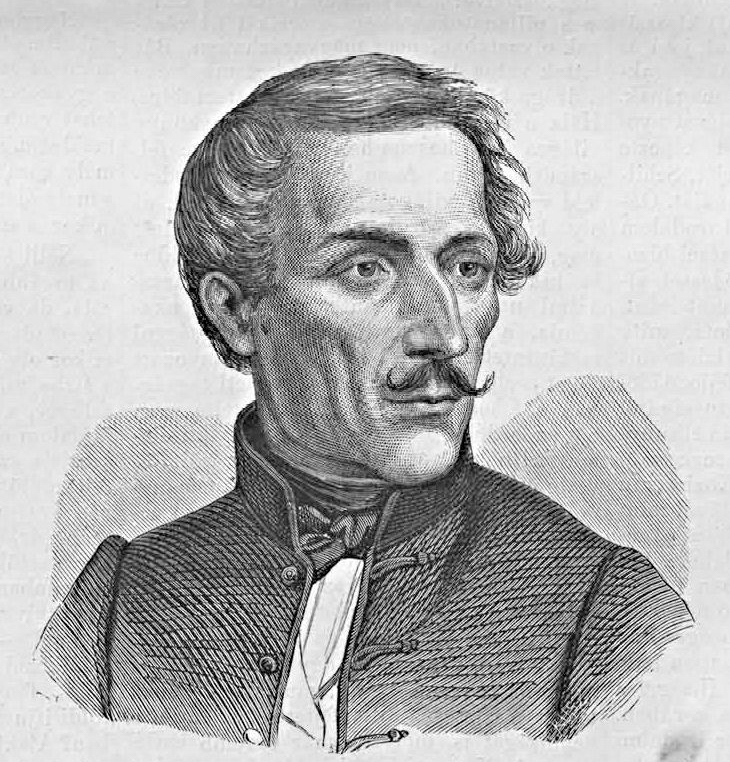

Sándor Bölöni Farkas or Alexander Farkas (Bölön, January 15, 1795 – February 2, 1842) was a writer who is perhaps best known for his journals (Journey in North America) he made while traveling the United States in 1831. He described the United States as a wonderland, and praised American democracy very highly. The book was banned by the Roman Catholic Church in 1834.

Farkas was a Hungarian Szekler Unitarian who was instrumental in making a connection between American and British Unitarians and the surviving Unitarian Church in Transylvania. He was the first Hungarian Unitarian to visit America, as the secretary to Count Francis Beldi on a trip to Paris and America. In three months—September 3 to November 23, 1831—Farkas and Count Beldi toured New York, Massachusetts, New Hampshire, Ohio, Pennsylvania, and Maryland. His Account of the Unitarians of Transylvania, was communicated in Latin to the Secretary of the British and Foreign Unitarian Association and published in The Unitarian advocate and religious miscellany in 1832.

== Works ==
- (Hungarian) Journal of a visit to America, Kolosvar 1834

There are two English translations of his Journey:

- Bölöni Farkas, Sándor. Journey in North America. Translated and edited by Theodore and Helen Benedek Schoenman. Philadelphia: American Philosophical Society, 1977. ISBN 0-87169-120-5 This was reprinted in 2014. ISBN 978-973-643-217-0
- Bölöni Farkas, Sándor. Journey in North America, 1831. Translated and edited by Arpad Kadarkay. Santa Barbara, Calif.: ABC-Clio, c1978. ISBN 0-87436-270-9

The Journey is available online in the original Hungarian:

- First Edition (1834)
- Second Edition (1835)

A facsimile publication of the 1834 first edition was published in 2014. ISBN 978-973-643-216-3
