= Júlia Goldman =

- Born: 25 September 1974; Orosháza, Hungary
- Education: University of Szeged
- Occupations: Author, teacher, mathematician, programmer
- Writing career
- Period: 1998–present
- Genres: Fantasy, sci-fi
- Notable works: The Swindler and the Wizard, Midnight, A Divine Roughhouse, A Hellish Roughhouse, Paper Tiger
- Website: jgoldenlane.hu

Júlia Goldman (born 25 September 1974, Orosháza) is a Hungarian author, mathematician, teacher and programmer. She writes under the pseudonym J. Goldenlane. Goldenlane is a popular fantasy author in Hungary. She had a strong influence on the Hungarian sci-fi and fantasy generation that started in the 2010s.

Her writings have been published by Delta Vision since 2015. It has also published revised editions of six of her earlier novels. Her novels were formerly published by Beholder.

== Early life and education ==
Júlia Goldman was born in Orosháza, Hungary. Her parents are archaeologists, and she was taught by them at the age of eight how to excavate a Neolithic tomb. She attended local schools and graduated at József Attila Tudományegyetem (now called University of Szeged). She studied programming, but never held a job in this field. She also studied violin and martial arts.

== Personal life ==
Goldman has worked as a mathematician and resides in Szeged. There she married and had three children with her husband before his death.

== Career ==
After the fall of the Soviet Union, the field of fantasy and science fiction publishing in Hungary was stimulated by social and political changes. Capitalism stimulated experimentation and many new journals and, finally, online publishing ventures flourished.

Goldman started writing short stories and novels, largely of the fantasy and science fiction genres. Writing under the pen name of J. Goldenlane, she sought out many publishing houses before Beholder finally published Isteni balhé (2001). Because of being isolated by language, Hungarian authors had a tradition of publishing under anglicized names to appeal to English-speaking markets. In addition, Goldman chose to use an initial rather than her given name to gain sales in the male-dominated fantasy/adventure world, as has English writer J.K. Rowling of the Harry Potter series.

In the following years Goldman published a series of novels with Beholder and short stories in a variety of journals. She has said that her style was influenced by Jenő Rejtő and Antal Szerb. In 2006 Goldman was described as "an outstanding new writer" by Hungarian editor Péter Tick.

After 2005, Goldman withdrew for a period from writing and publishing to devote more time to her family. But she co-authored a cookbook with Diána Balogh.

Goldenlane published again in 2015 with her post-apocalyptic novel Napnak fénye, released by Delta Vision. This house has also begun to publish revised editions of her older works, releasing six novels by 2016. It will continue to publish her future works.

=== Trivia ===
- Her first novel, Isteni balhé was published thanks to a power shortage. The editor of the publisher was waiting for his computer to restart and happened to start reading her manuscript. He said that he could not stop reading it, he enjoyed it so much, and supported its being published.
- After her husband's death, she started a Patreon page to finance her writing career, in addition to supporting her three children.

== Bibliography ==
=== Novels ===
- Isteni balhé (A Divine Roughhouse) (Beholder Kft., 2001; Delta Vision, 2016)
- A szélhámos és a varázsló (The Swindler and the Wizard) (Szukits Könyvkiadó, 2001; Beholder Kft., 2006 – revised edition)
- Farkastestvér (Wolfkin) (Beholder Kft., 2002; Delta Vision, 2015)
- Papírtigris (Paper Tiger) (Beholder Kft, 2002)
- A herceg jósnője (The Oracle of the Prince) (Beholder Kft., 2003)
- A jósnő hercege (The Prince of the Oracle) (Beholder Kft., 2003)
- Pokoli balhé (A Hellish Roughhouse) (Beholder Kft., 2004; Delta Vision, 2016)
- Éjfél (Midnight) (Beholder Kft., 2005; Delta Vision, 2015)
- Napnak fénye (Sunlight) (Delta Vision, 2015)
- Holdnak árnyéka (Moonshadow) (Delta Vision, 2015)
- Csillagok szikrái (Star Sparkles) (Delta Vision, 2016)
- Térdig sárban (Knee-deep in the Mud) (Delta Vision, 2019)
- Városi történet (Urban story) (Design Kiadó, 2022)
- Időben (In time) (Design Kiadó, 2023)
- Időn kívül (Out of time) (Design Kiadó, 2023)

=== Short stories ===
- Kardnemesek (Nobles of the Sword)
- Tengerészlegendák (Sailors’ Legends)
- Sytisi történet (A Tale in Sytis)
- A párbaj (The Duel)
- Horror a kiskertben (Horror in the Garden)
- Barbár-project (Project Barbarian)
- Egy kardot tartó kéz (A Swordwielding Arm)
- Csillagfény (Starshine)

=== Non-fiction ===
- Kedvcsináló szakácsköny (Encouraging Cookbook, co-authored with Diána Balogh)
