= The Sound of Many Waters =

Painting by John Everett Millais

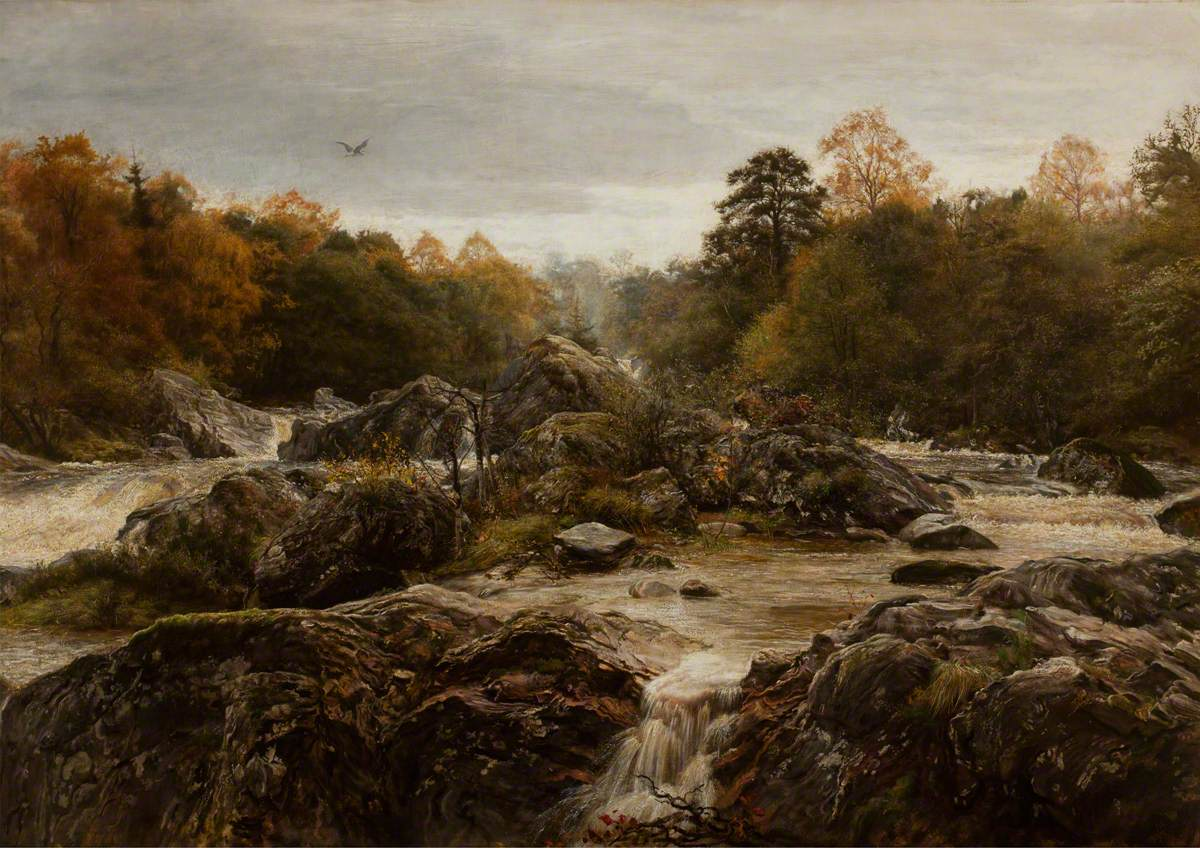
- Artist: John Everett Millais
- Year: 1876
- Type: Oil on canvas, landscape painting
- Dimensions: 57.5 cm × 107.8 cm (22.6 in × 42.4 in)
- Location: Fyvie Castle, Aberdeenshire

The Sound of Many Waters is an 1876 landscape painting by the British artist John Everett Millais. It depicts a view of the Falls of the Braan near Dunkeld in Perthshire. Millais was staying nearby and the picture was produced on the spot En plein air.

The title is taken from the Book of Revelation. The painting was displayed at the Royal Academy of Arts's Summer Exhibition of 1877 at Burlington House in London. Today it is in the collection of Fyvie Castle in Aberdeenshire in the control of the National Trust for Scotland.

== See also ==
- List of paintings by John Everett Millais

== Bibliography ==
- Barlow, Paul. Time Present and Time Past: The Art of John Everett Millais. Routledge, 2017.
- Bradley, Ian. Water: A Spiritual History. Bloomsbury Publishing, 2012.
- Fleming, Gordon H. John Everett Millais: A Biography. Constable, 1998.
- Riding, Christine. John Everett Millais. Harry N. Abrams, 2006.
