= Veronika Makai =

Hungarian handball player (born 1994)

Personal information
- Full name: Veronika Makai
- Nationality: Hungarian
- Born: 10 September 1994 (age 32) Orosháza, Hungary
- Height: 1.78 m (5 ft 10 in)

Sport
- Sport: Handball
- Position: Goalkeeper

Youth career
- Years: Team
- –2006: Nagyszénás Orosháza KSE
- 2006–2010: Orosháza KSC
- 2010–2011: Debreceni VSC

Senior clubs
- Years: Team
- 2011–2015: Debeceni VSC

Veronika Makai (born 10 September 1994 in Orosháza) is a Hungarian handball goalkeeper.

She joined DVSC in the summer of 2011 for the invitation of former DVSC great and youth coach Erika Csapó. After 4 seasons, she left the team in 2015.
