= Gábor Kovács (financier) =

- Born: 2 January 1957; Orosháza, Hungary
- Education: MGIMO
- Occupations: financier, banker, art collector, philanthropist
- Years active: 1980–
- Website: Official homepage

Gábor Kovács (born 2 January 1957, in Orosháza) is a Hungarian financier, banker, art collector, philanthropist and founder of KOGART.

== Life and career ==
Having studied at the Moscow State Institution for International Relations (MGIMO) between 1975 and 1980, he started his career at the Hungarian National Bank. He was the first managing director of Citibank Budapest from 1985, before becoming the vice-president of Citibank London. Back in Hungary by 1991, he founded Bankár Holding Plc., which he now heads as president and CEO. It was at this time that he began to collect works by, as well as to support, Hungarian artists. His collection spans the history of Hungarian painting from the early 18th to the mid-20th century.

On 8 November 2003, he established the Gábor Kovács Art Foundation with a HUF 3 bn capital stock, and opened KOGART House on 20 April 2004.

He has been a member of the Trilateral Commission since 2006.

Following its full-scale renovation, he reopened, with a new function, the Pauline-Carmelite Monastery of Sopronbánfalva in 2010, which was managed and owned by him till 2015.

Above all, he is interested in finding answers for the new social and economic challenges of the 21st century.

=== Milestones of his career ===
- 1980–1985 Hungarian National Bank, Foreign Exchange Controls Department, International Section, Scandinavian officer,
- 1985–1989 Citibank Rt. (Budapest), managing director,
- 1989–1991 Citibank (London), vice-president,
- 1991– Bankár Ltd. (Budapest), managing director, later Bankár Holding Plc., president-CEO.

=== Beauty—Harmony—Equilibrium ===
"I learnt my sensitivity to beauty from my mother. As a child, I was already intrigued by man and landscape: beauty and harmony, the sense of space and the horizon, the meeting of the sky and the earth. Of course, I had no idea of such abstract notions in Kakasszék. All I knew was that people there were sincere and earned their living with hard work. Beauty is of course subjective. A face, a tree, a train arriving at the Kakasszék station, a lake nearby were beautiful. The larks starting to sing in spring and the return of the swallows showed the harmony of life. The birds gathering in autumn before migration hinted at transitoriness. Kakasszék is the past. It has changed. It has lost its character. Most of the elderly have left for other beauties. My mother moved closer to me. The feelings, however, are the same. This emotional world echoes in my collection, in this book.

In my early youth I was not too receptive to art. I was over thirty when it touched me. Since then I have been its captive. In 1991, for the empty walls of my new office I bought eight pictures, only Hungarian ones. The first sampling proved successful. Works by István Csók, Gusztáv Magyar Mannheimer and Márk Rubovics are still noted items in my collection. Collecting became a passion and stole into my everyday life. My scope of interest kept stretching toward 19th-century classicist, romantic landscapes, then early 19th-century portraits, and I got to Nagybánya as well. The legacy of Ádám Mányoki and János Kupeczky is also part of the Hungarian atmosphere. The Hungarian National Gallery wanted Ferenc Rákóczi II to re-marry Charlotte Amelie, princess of Hessen. With my help, they managed to do so—for the duration of the Ádám Mányoki exhibition.

Lajos Gulácsy and Tivadar Csontváry Kosztka found me, too! By some miracle, masterpieces find me.

The encounter with the paintings of Károly Markó the Elder had an elementary impact on me. I was wholly overcome by the passion for Markó. György Károlyi commissioned Károly Markó the Elder to paint a picture in 1836. It was Women by the Well (Serpent Killer). The picture was owned by the Károlyi family during the past 150 years and it came into my possession by the courtesy of the heirs of Katinka Andrássy. It was an incredible accident again that I came across another latent chef d'œuvre known only in verbal description: St. Paul Shipwrecked on Malta. One Markó picture attracted the next. I bought the sixteenth item of my Markó collection at a Sotheby's auction in London in the summer of 2003. Another masterpiece—the painting had never been seen in Hungary. It was purchased by a Spanish infante after Markó's death in Italy, in the 1860s. I take greatest pride in this segment of my collection: the romantic landscapes, the Markós, Ligetis, Telepys. I probably owe it to this encounter that now I have not only some three hundred pictures but also a collection spunning from the early 18th century to 1935 expressing more or less the same sensitivity.

When it comes to the second half of the 20th century, however, I am at a loss. It was just a few years ago that I began to open up to this period. The works of art grow in number—Jenő Barcsay, Menyhért Tóth, Endre Bálint and the lifework of János Bozsó, just to mention a few names. This material has not matured into a coherent whole yet. That will be my collector's task for the next ten years. The organizing principles are binding: sincerity, beauty, harmony... Works of art that are close to me, that touch me.

The past thirteen years of my life was about business in the first place and collecting art was only secondary. Giving up my post in London, I went into entrepreneurship. I wanted to show my expertise in my country. There were many transactions, many successes, my fortune increased. I kept rushing on, to new challenges, to new transactions. I did not realize the enormous difference between wealth and eternal values. I thought I would succeed in achieving everything. I was wrong.

After three years of bitter struggle, one day in 2002 I caught sight of Zsuzsa Péreli's latest work, Aequilibrium, on the wall of the Gobelin Museum in Aubusson. I immediately knew where I had made a mistake. It took just a nick of time to realize that the missing element in my successful but lopsided life was equilibrium. I had to create harmony not only in my environment, among the Markós, but also in my own soul. I realised that genuine equilibrium was not horizontal but between spiritual goals and earthly values. Between "Heaven" and "Earth". Earthly goals in heavenly perspectives. From the horizon of Kakasszék through the beauty of Markó's landscape I arrived at Péreli's search for equilibrium. I wish that everyone will cover this road in their hearts.

These experiences gave impetus to the idea of the Gábor Kovács Art Foundation. The 21st century is the century of foundations. Foundation is the future. The art works being created now will enrich the collection of the Gábor Kovács Art Foundation. We would like to build a collection characterized by beauty, harmony, a search for equilibrium, by inspired sincerity representing high spiritual goals and eternal values hidden in external beauty. I am sure that in the next one hundred years we will find the artists who "come in touch with God" as Csontváry says in his diary. After sixty years of solitude, our art will be part of European art again. And to the joy of us all, a collection will be created involving real values which have a message for us all."

— Gábor Kovács, 2004

== Awards and distinctions ==
2005: Summa Artium Award, “For Contemporary Art” category, for his extensive work as an organizer and supporter of art. 2005: Knight’s Cross of the Order of Merit of the Republic of Hungary

== Sources ==
- Biográf Ki Kicsoda (Hungarian Who is Who). Budapest, 2002.
