= Maricucha =

- Genre: Telenovela
- Created by: Víctor Falcón
- Developed by: Eduardo Adrianzén
- Written by: Eduardo Adrianzén; Jimena Ortiz de Zevallos; Rogger Vergara; Luis Francisco Palomino; Abel Enríquez; Rita Solf; Bruno Alvarado; Johuseline Porcel; Tito Céliz
- Directed by: Ani Alva Helfer; Michelle Alexander
- Starring: Patricia Barreto; Gustavo Bueno; Andrés Vílchez; Haydeé Cáceres; Gustavo Borjas
- Theme music composer: Juan Carlos Fernández
- Opening theme: "Maricucha" by Gran Orquesta Internacional, Patricia Barreto & André Silva
- Composer: Juan Carlos Fernández
- Country of origin: Peru
- Original language: Spanish
- No. of seasons: 2
- No. of episodes: 197

Production
- Executive producer: Ivanna de la Piedra
- Producers: Adriana Álvarez; Francisco Álvarez; Hugo Coya; Michelle Alexander
- Camera setup: Multi-camera
- Production company: Del Barrio Producciones

Original release
- Network: América Televisión
- Release: 10 January 2022 – 11 April 2023

Maricucha is a Peruvian telenovela created by Víctor Falcón. It aired on América Televisión from 10 January 2022 to 11 April 2023. The series stars Patricia Barreto, Gustavo Bueno, Andrés Vílchez, Haydeé Cáceres and Gustavo Borjas.

== Series overview ==
=== Season 1 (2022) ===
Maricucha is a young cook who arrives in Lima from her native Cajamarca to work in the house of the Corbacho family, a dysfunctional family with members who are ambitious, lazy, indifferent, and believe they own the world thanks to the money of the patriarch, Antonio. They live without worries or anything affecting their superficial lives. However, Maricucha's arrival at the Corbacho house will turn every member of the family upside down, and they will do everything possible to get rid of her. Nevertheless, Maricucha does not let herself be easily defeated, while at the same time she will find love in the family's heir: Renato.

=== Season 2 (2022–23) ===
After being humiliated by the Corbachos, Maricucha decides to travel to Cajamarca where she reunites with her family but at the same time gets involved in new troubles, having to deal with Rosmery, her cousin who has usurped her place within the family, and with Gregorio, her childhood best friend who is determined to win her over. Renato convinces Maricucha to return to Lima, and her family members also move to the capital city one by one. However, back in Lima, Maricucha faces a new and powerful enemy: the corrupt and cruel businessman Raymundo Rossi.

== Cast ==
- Patricia Barreto as María Augusta "Maricucha" López Huamán (seasons 1-2)
- Gustavo Bueno as Antonio Humberto "Toñito" Corbacho Arévalo (season 1)
- Andrés Vílchez as Renato William Montero Corbacho (seasons 1-2)
- Gustavo Borjas as Alberto Ronaldo "Beto" Vásquez Rojas (season 1)
- Milene Vásquez as María Fernanda Victoria Corbacho Espinoza (seasons 1-2)
- László Kovács as Gianluca Montero Bradbury (season 1)
- Ximena Díaz as María Teresa "Teté" Corbacho Espinoza (seasons 1-2)
- Elsa Olivero as Dora "Dorita" Soriano (seasons 1-2)
- Víctor Prada as Don Édgar (season 1)
- Stephanie Orúe as Samantha Ramírez Nájar (season 1)
- Sebastián Monteghirfo as Damián / Paulo "Pato" Ferrante Goycochea (seasons 1-2)
- Valentina Saba as Carla Pardo D'Alessio (seasons 1-2)
- Irene Eyzaguirre as Aleida Rojas (season 1)
- Emanuel Soriano as Julio "Julito" Acosta Soriano (season 1)
- Miguel Dávalos as Manuel Vásquez Rojas "El Gato" (seasons 1-2)
- Rodrigo Palacios as Emilio Pariona (season 1)
- Gloria Klein as Omaira Campoamor Baca (season 1)
- Jesús Aranda as Nepo Museno "Napuseno" (season 1, main; season 2, recurring)
- Sebastián Barreto as Jonathan Ramírez Nájar (season 1)
- Kailani Pinedo as Vania Montero Corbacho (seasons 1-2)
- Haydeé Cáceres as Doña Clara "Clarita" Hinojosa (season 1)
- Paul Martin as Raymundo Rossi Hochschild (season 2)
- Norka Ramírez as Doña Herminia Huamán "Mamá Herminia" (season 2)
- Andrea Alvarado as Rosa María "Rosmery" Li Huamán "Maritrucha" (season 2)
- Christian Domínguez as Vicente "Chente" Angarita Huamán / Vicente "Chente" López Huamán (season 2)
- Stefano Meier as Doménico Rossi del Águila (season 2)
- Carlos Thornton Olano|Carlos Thornton as Gregorio "Goyito" Landa McGregor (season 2)
- Raysa Ortiz as Angelique Martel "La chica de la playa" (season 2)
- Arianna Fernández as Julietta "Juli" Rossi del Águila (season 2)
- Brando Gallesi as Jair Romero Solís "El Pulgas" (season 2)
- Mariano Ramírez as Luis "Luchito" López Huamán (season 2)

== Reception ==
The first season premiered on 10 January 2022 with a percentage rating of 25 points, becoming the most watched program in its timeslot. The second season premiered on 15 November 2025 with a percentage rating of 23.6 points, becoming the most watched program in primetime.
