= Dániel Kovács =

Dániel Kovács may refer to:

- Dániel Kovács (footballer, born June 1990), Hungarian footballer playing for Újpest FC from 2009
- Dániel Kovács (footballer, born July 1990), Hungarian footballer playing for Vasas SC from 2011
- Dániel Kovács (footballer, born 1994), Hungarian footballer
- Dan Kovacs (born 1970), American powerlifter
