= Journey in North America =

1834 book by Sándor Bölöni Farkas

- Author: Sándor Bölöni Farkas
- Original title: Utazás Észak-Amerikában
- Language: Hungarian
- Published: Tilsch János
- Publication date: 1834
- English publication date: 1977

Journey in North America (original Hungarian title: Utazás Észak-Amerikában) is a book by Sándor Bölöni Farkas published in 1834. The author, travelling in the United States of America (New York, Massachusetts, New Hampshire, Vermont, Pennsylvania, Ohio, Maryland and New Jersey) and in Canada (Québec and Ontario) paid special attention to the social relations of these countries, which he put as an example to the feudalistic Hungary of that time.

The book was a big success in the Hungarian Reform Era, being read by the young reformers of the parliament of 1832–36 at Pozsony. István Széchenyi expressed his thanks to the author in a letter, calling his work the most useful and most beautiful gift. In 1835 the book was banned and could be read only by special permission. The book inspired several young reformers (Ferenc Pulszky, Ágoston Trefort, László Szalay, Pál Hunfalvy, Bertalan Szemere, István Gorove, Lőrinc Tóth, József Irinyi) to travel and to write about their experiences abroad.

== Publication ==
In 1830–1831, the author, as the secretary of Count Ferenc Béldi, travelled to Western Europe, the United States of America, and Canada. He prepared for the trip by reading up on the geography, economy and laws of the respective countries, and he studied their languages. In his book, he cites about fifty of the journals, books, statistical publications and political writings he read before and during his journey.

After his return, he finished his book at the end of 1833 and the beginning of 1834 and sent it to his friends Gábor Döbrentei and Miklós Wesselényi. On the advice of friends, he tried to publish it in Leipzig. Still, on December 20, 1833, he got the answer that the German censors were told to stop at the border every Hungarian book published abroad, to examine, and give it back to the owner only if the content was not subject to censorship. As this procedure could take more than half a year, it represented a financial risk to the publisher, who did not want to tie up his capital and risk losing it. Therefore, the author asked permission from the Transylvanian censorship office which he considered more lenient. The censorship office asked the opinion of Sámuel Méhes, a Calvinist professor, who, after reading the book, asked that an additional censor be appointed. The Catholic bishop Miklós Kovács, responsible for the censorship, named the Catholic abbot János Szabó from the Kolozsmonostor Abbey. These two censors deleted some parts of the text and declared the work eligible to be published.

On April 24, 1834, Bölöni Farkas agreed with the bookseller János Tilsch to publish the book with the following conditions: the fee for the author would be 260 silver forints, half of which payable at the beginning of printing, the other half at the end of it – latest in August; maximum 1,100 copies could be printed, of which 25 were to be given to the author; the book could not be sold for a price higher than two forints; and the name of the author could not be posted outside the bookshop. The printing was executed between 30 June and 25 July 1834, and for the second edition between 2 and 23 March 1835.

In September 1835, the Government of Transylvania received the list of prohibited books in which the work of Bölöni Farkas was classified as "readable only by special permission." The author commented in his diary: "Great honour for my work! After all, it might contain something which had an effect. But it's too late – I assume the poison has had its effect, and it will only worsen with the prohibition."

Archduke Ferdinand Karl Joseph of Austria-Este, governor of Transylvania, started an investigation on 26 April 1836 at the command of the Habsburg emperor to determine how the publishing of the work had been possible under the control of the Transylvanian Censorship. Bishop Miklós Kovács argued that the prohibition arrived only on 25 November 1835, and the censors were informed about it on 11 December. Professor Sámuel Méhes stated that he executed several deletions in the text, and the final approval was given by the censorship office. Abbot János Szabó excused himself, saying that he read only the parts proposed for deletion by Professor Méhes and, on that basis, gave his opinion to the office. The investigation had no consequence to the author.

== Content ==
The approximative route

The first two chapters describe briefly the travel to Western Europe and the crossing of the ocean. From the third chapter on, the events of the journey are presented together with the description and history of the notable places visited and a specific social or economic issue. Several statistical data are presented as well. The author constantly compares the United States with his own country; for example, when arriving in New York City, he realizes two important differences: no passport needed to enter the States and the customs officer accepts the declaration of the traveller and does not check the luggage. The description is completed in some cases by the translation of documents: chapter 8 contains the Declaration of Independence, chapter 13 the Constitution of New Hampshire, and chapter 25 Article Two of the United States Constitution. The content of each chapter is shown in the table below. The 29th (last) chapter describes the trip back to Europe.

Chapter	State	Place	Sights	Other issues
3.	New York	New York	Broadway, City Hall	conditions for entering the country, idea of equality, public associations, school system, lack of noble class
4.	New York	New York	New York Harbor	number of steamboats
4.	New York	Sing Sing	prison	
4.	New York	Peekskill		number of newspapers, the role of press, invention of steamboat
5.	New York	West Point	military school	educational system
5.	New York	Albany	New York State Capitol, Erie Canal	jurisdiction, cause of population increase
6.	New York	New Lebanon		Shakers and Methodists
7.	Massachusetts			the first colonists, the Tea Act and Boston Tea Party, the battles of Lexington and Concord
8.	Massachusetts	Amherst	college and academy	lodging houses, the Declaration of Independence
9.	Massachusetts	Boston	Boston Athenæum, City Hall, harbour	social behaviour, shipbuilding, siege of Boston
10.	Massachusetts	Charlestown	prison	prison system
11.	Massachusetts	Cambridge	Harvard University	schools, theological seminaries
12.	Massachusetts	Lowell	textile factory	travel books about America, religions
13.	New Hampshire	Concord		Constitution of New Hampshire
14.	Vermont	Montpelier		The population of the United States by states (1830)
14.	Quebec	La Prairie	monastery of the grey nuns	
15.	Quebec	Montreal		
15.	Quebec	Quebec City	Citadelle of Quebec	government, economy and population of Canada
15.	Quebec	Saint Lawrence River		indigenous peoples of the Americas, emigration
15.	Ontario	Lake Ontario		
15.	Ontario	York		British benefits for settlers in Canada
16.	Ontario / New York	Niagara Falls	Goat Island	
17.	New York	Buffalo		condition of the indigenous people, population, reservations; life of Lafayette
18.	New York	Lake Erie, Dunkirk		
18.	Pennsylvania	Erie		freedom of religion, various faiths
19.	Pennsylvania	Springfield (Erie County)		electoral system
19.	Ohio			newspaper distribution, population of Cincinnati
19.	Pennsylvania			number of steamboats on the Ohio River
20.	Pennsylvania	Economy	textile factory, museum	Harmony Society, George Rapp, movement of Robert Owen
21.	Pennsylvania	Pittsburgh	factories, bridges	
21.	Maryland			slavery in the United States
22.	Maryland	Baltimore	Washington Monument	libraries, railway, black people
23.	District of Columbia	Washington, D.C.	United States Capitol, White House	
24.	District of Columbia	Washington, D.C.	White House	Andrew Jackson; the legal status and powers of the president of the United States and of the United States Congress
25.				budget of the United States, Armed Forces and National Guard, Fleet
26.	Virginia	Mount Vernon	Washington's Tomb	John Smith and Pocahontas
27.	Maryland	Baltimore		horse races
28.	Pennsylvania	Philadelphia	banks, City Hall, museum, Philadelphia Mint	philanthropic and scientific associations; hydroelectric power plant; Quakers, statistical data about different confessions

== Point of view ==
The work, which appeared before Alexis de Tocqueville's Democracy in America (La Démocratie en Amérique, 1835–39) in most cases idealizes American society as one based on social equality and justice, the realization of the ideas of Classical liberalism, an example worth following. The praise of American society is at once a critique of the Hungarian one. Bölöni Farkas attributes great importance to public education, to the press and non-governmental organizations.

In some cases, Bölöni included his liberal thoughts as if they were translations, probably to evade censorship. An example is the speech on the freedom of religion attributed in chapter 18 to President Monroe. In several cases, he showed his Republicanist views. He considered the utopian socialist experiment of the Harmony Society in Economy, Pennsylvania strange but appreciated the altruism that created it.

He attacked slavery vehemently and had bitter words about the treatment of the indigenous people. Similar to Tocqueville, he concluded that freeing the slaves in the future would result in racial conflicts.

== Style ==
The part about Europe is like a diary characterized by the chronological enumeration of the facts. In contrast, the American part is dominated by a thematic approach for which the author used several sources of statistical data. The style of the book is characterized by the flexibility of the live speech. In an effort to meet readers' expectations, he did not use foreign words, replacing them in some cases with Hungarian expressions of his invention. Next to expressions describing things specific to America, he showed the original English names in parentheses. The descriptions are sometimes coloured by romantic elements (e.g., the Falls of the Braan in Scotland, the storm on the ocean, Niagara Falls). Speaking about American society his style is enthusiastic.

== Reactions ==
The book was a huge success: the 1,100 copies of the first edition were soon sold out, and in a short time, it had another two editions. In the library of the Kolozsvár Unitarian College, which was open to the public as well, it was the most borrowed book. It was read by the students at the Eastern Catholic theological seminary in Balázsfalva as well. The journal Jelenkor published the part about George Washington and his home and recommended the book to the readers in a special note. On 10 September 1834, István Széchenyi wrote a letter to the author, in which he called the Journey his most useful and most beautiful gift and thanked the author for it. For the politicians of the Hungarian Reform Era, it served as a handbook; among others, Lajos Kossuth was reading it, and it was widely known by the young reformers of the 1832–36 parliament at Pozsony. A bit later, the young Balázs Orbán knew it almost by heart.

On 8 November 1834, the author was elected a corresponding member of the Hungarian Academy of Sciences, and in 1835, he was given the Academic Prize for the best book of the year.

From the few contemporary critics, Canon Károly Somogyi took exception not to the book itself but the ideas of the religious sects presented in it. In 1842, the advocate István Éllássy attacked the author, asking, "How far will the venom of reformism drag the nation if the followers of the vainglorious North American traveller are permitted to impact the essence of the country's laws?"

The travel of Bölöni Farkas – together with the travel of Miklós Wesselényi to England in 1822 – encouraged several young reformers to travel and to write about their experiences abroad Ferenc Pulszky (Uti vázolatok, 1836), Ágoston Trefort (Utazási töredékek, 1836), László Szalay (Uti naplómból, 1839), Pál Hunfalvy (Drezdai levelek, 1839), Bertalan Szemere (Utazás külföldön, 1840), István Gorove (Nyugat, 1844), Lőrinc Tóth (Uti tárcza, 1844), József Irinyi (Német-, francia- és angolországi úti jegyzetek, 1846). They primarily described the social, legal and economic systems and not the geography or art history of the respective countries.

After its initial success, the book was republished only one hundred years later, in 1935, followed by three additional editions, the last appearing in 1984 in 8,500 copies.

== Editions ==
- Utazás Észak-Amerikában. Kolozsvár: Ifj. Tilsch János. 1834.
- Utazás Észak-Amerikában. Kolozsvár: Evangélikus Református Kollégium. 1834.
- Utazás Észak-Amerikában. Kolozsvár: Tilsch János. 1835.
- Utazás Észak-Amerikában. Kolozsvár: Orient Könyvnyomda. 1935. Kiss Elek előszavával.
- Utazás Észak-Amerikában. Budapest: Officina. 1943. Szerk. és bevezető Remenyik Zsigmond.
- Utazás Észak-Amerikában. Bukarest: Irodalmi. 1966. Sajtó alá rend., bev, jegyz. Benkő Samu.
- Utazás Észak-Amerikában. Kolozsvár: Dacia. 1970. Tanulók Könyvtára sorozat. Bev., jegyz. Mikó Imre.
- Journey in North America. Memoirs of the American Philosophical Society 120. Philadelphia, 1977. Trans., ed. by Theodore Schönemann and Helen Schönemann.
- Journey in North America, 1831. Santa Barbara: ABC-CLIO. 1978. Trans., ed. by Arpad Kadarkay. ISBN 0874362709
- Von Transsylvanien bis Pennsylvanien. Reiseerlebnisse vor 150 Jahren. Gyoma: Corvina. 1980. Übers. v. Henriette Engl, Géza Engl. ISBN 9631309177
- Napnyugati utazás, napló. (1835–1836). Budapest: Helikon. 1984. Vál., szerk., bev. tanulmány Maller Sándor, sajtó alá rend. Benkő Samu. ISBN 9632076990

== Sources ==
- Berényi Zsuzsanna Ágnes (2004). "A szabadkőműves Kossuth Lajos". In Kertész Botond (ed.). Kossuth és az egyházak (PDF). Budapest: Luther. pp. 117–139. Archived from the original (PDF) on 2015-04-02.
- Bölöni Farkas Sándor (1984). Napnyugati utazás. Napló (1835–1836). Budapest: Helikon. ISBN 9632076990.
- Fenyő István (1964). "A polgárosodás eszmevilága útirajzainkban 1848 előtt" (PDF). Irodalomtörténeti Közlemények. 68 (5–6): 603–613.
- József Gellén (1976). "Alexander Bölöni Farkas and Alexis de Tocqueville on America, a comparison of the two attitudes". Angol filológiai tanulmányok. 10: 27–41. JSTOR 41273711.
- Jakab Elek (1870). "Bölöni Farkas Sándor és kora" (PDF). Keresztény Magvető. 5 (4): 241–334.
- Jancsó Elemér (1942). "Bölöni Farkas Sándor élete és munkássága 1795–1842". Az Erdélyi Tudományos Intézet évkönyve (PDF). Kolozsvár: Minerva. Archived from the original (PDF) on 2015-01-19.
- Lakó Elemér (1994). "A Kolozsvári Unitárius Kollégium könyvtára kölcsönzőinek magyar irodalmi és politikai olvasmányai 1813–1848 között" (PDF). Erdélyi Múzeum. 56 (1–2): 51–74.
- Maller Sándor (1984). "„Az egykönyvű író"?". Bölöni Farkas Sándor: Napnyugati utazás. Napló. Budapest: Helikon. pp. 5–93. ISBN 9632076990.
- Mikó Imre (June 1976). "A Függetlenségi Nyilatkozat" (PDF). Korunk. 35 (6).
- Simon-Szabó Ágnes (2011). "Werther-fordítások kulturális átértelmezései 1800 körül fordításelméleti és filológiai megközelítésben" (PDF). SZTE Doktori Repozitórium.
- Simon-Szabó Ágnes (2012). "A kultúra szövegeinek összefonódása, avagy diszkurzusteremtés fordítói eszközökkel: Bölöni Farkas Sándor útirajzairól" (PDF). Filológiai Közlöny. 58 (4): 414–431. Archived from the original (PDF) on 2015-04-02.
- Sőtér István, ed. (1964–1966). A magyar irodalom története. Budapest: Akadémiai. ISBN 963 05 1639 X.
- Szabolcsi Miklós, ed. (1979–1985). A magyar sajtó története. Budapest: Akadémiai. ISBN 963 05 1772 8.
- Tardy Lajos (1986). "Hogyan kerülhette el Bölöni Farkas Sándor a börtönt?" (PDF). Irodalomtörténet. 18 (2): 523–539.
