= Ferenc Kovács =

Ferenc Kovács may refer to:

- Ferenc Kovács (footballer) (1934–2018), Hungarian footballer and coach
- Ferenc Kovács (politician, born 1953), Hungarian politician
- Ferenc Kovács (politician, born 1960), Hungarian jurist and politician
- Ferenc Kovács (table tennis), Hungarian table tennis international
- Ferenc Soma Kovács (born 2004), Hungarian runner
