= Gábor Kovács =

Gábor Kovács may refer to:

- Gábor Kovács (financier) (born 1957), Hungarian financier, banker and philanthropist
- Gábor Kovács (footballer, born September 1987), Hungarian association football defender
- Gábor Kovács (footballer, born October 1987), Hungarian association football striker
- Gábor Kovács (water polo) (born 1989), Hungarian water polo player
