= Péter Kovács =

Péter Kovács may refer to:

- Péter Kovács (serial killer) (1934–1968), Hungarian serial killer
- Péter Kovács (handballer) (born 1955), Hungarian Olympic handball player
- Péter Kovács (gymnast) (1959-2024), Hungarian gymnast
- Péter Kovács (lawyer) (born 1959), Hungarian judge of the Constitutional Court
- Péter Kovács (politician) (born 1971), Hungarian politician
- Péter Kovács (footballer) (born 1978), Hungarian footballer
- Péter Kovács (basketball) (born 1989), Hungarian basketball player
- Péter Kovács (painter), 2008 recipient of the Kossuth Prize

== See also ==
- Péter Eckstein-Kovács (born 1956), Romanian lawyer and politician
