= Orosháza =

- Town
- Flag Coat of arms

- Location within Hungary Location within Europe
- Coordinates: 46°34′N 20°40′E
- Country: Hungary
- County: Békés
- District: Orosháza

Area
  - Total: 202.22 km^{2} (78.08 sq mi)

Population (2013)
  - Total: 28,888
  - Density: 146.52/km^{2} (379.5/sq mi)
- Time zone: UTC+1 (CET)
  - Summer (DST): UTC+2 (CEST)
- Postal code: 5900, 5903, 5911, 5931
- Area code: (+36) 68
- Website: www.oroshaza.hu

Orosháza is a city situated in the westernmost part of Békés county, Hungary, on the Békés ridge bordered by the rivers Maros and Körös. Orosháza is an important cultural, educational and recreational centre of the region.

== Main sights ==
The city's main attractions are the Orosháza-Gyopárosfürdő spa complex, the Szántó Kovács János Museum, the Darvas József Literary Memorial House, and the Town Art Gallery. The only museum in the country devoted to water wells is found in Orosháza. At the Rágyánszky Arboretum, more than 2000 plant species in 6000 varieties can be seen.

The Lutheran church, was built between 1777 and 1830 in late Baroque style. It is located in the centre of the town. The bell carried by the first settlers, who migrated from Zomba, is kept in front of the altar of the church.

A number of cultural and entertaining programmes are organised in the town every year.

== Notable residents ==
- The cantor Marcel Lorand was born in the city in 1912. He learned music with Béla Bartók and became the cantor of the Synagogue de la Paix in Strasbourg, France, in 1964. He died in 1988.
- Júlia Goldman (b. 1974), was born in Oroshaza and is noted as an "outstanding writer" of fantasy and adventure.
- Gyula Gömbös, prime minister of Hungary was made an honorary citizen of the city in 1932.
- Veronika Makai (b. 1994), professional handball player

== Orosháza-Gyopárosfürdő spa complex ==
The Gyopárosfürdő district of Orosháza is located 3 km from the city center. Gyopárosfürdő has been well known for its thermal water since 1869, which rises from a depth of 670 meters. Set in a 10-hectare park, the Orosháza-Gyopárosfürdő Thermal Spa, Park and Adventure Pools spa complex has 8 outdoor and 5 indoor pools, including adventure pools, thermal pools, children's pools and even a 50-meter cold-water sports pool.

Official website: Orosháza-Gyopárosfürdő

== Gallery ==
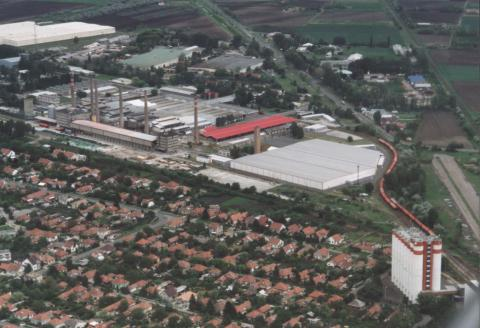
Aerial photograph of the glass factory

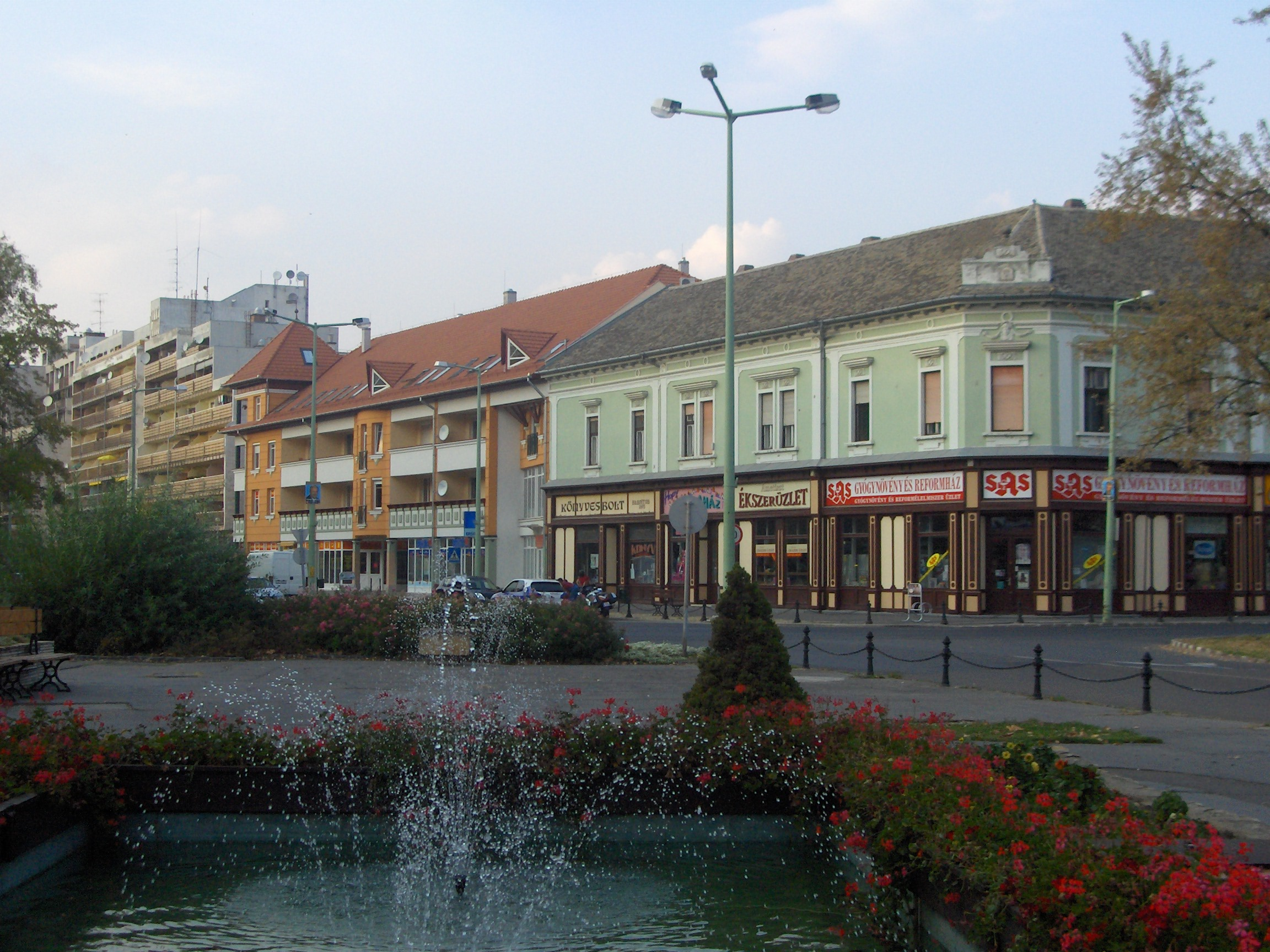
View of downtown Orosháza

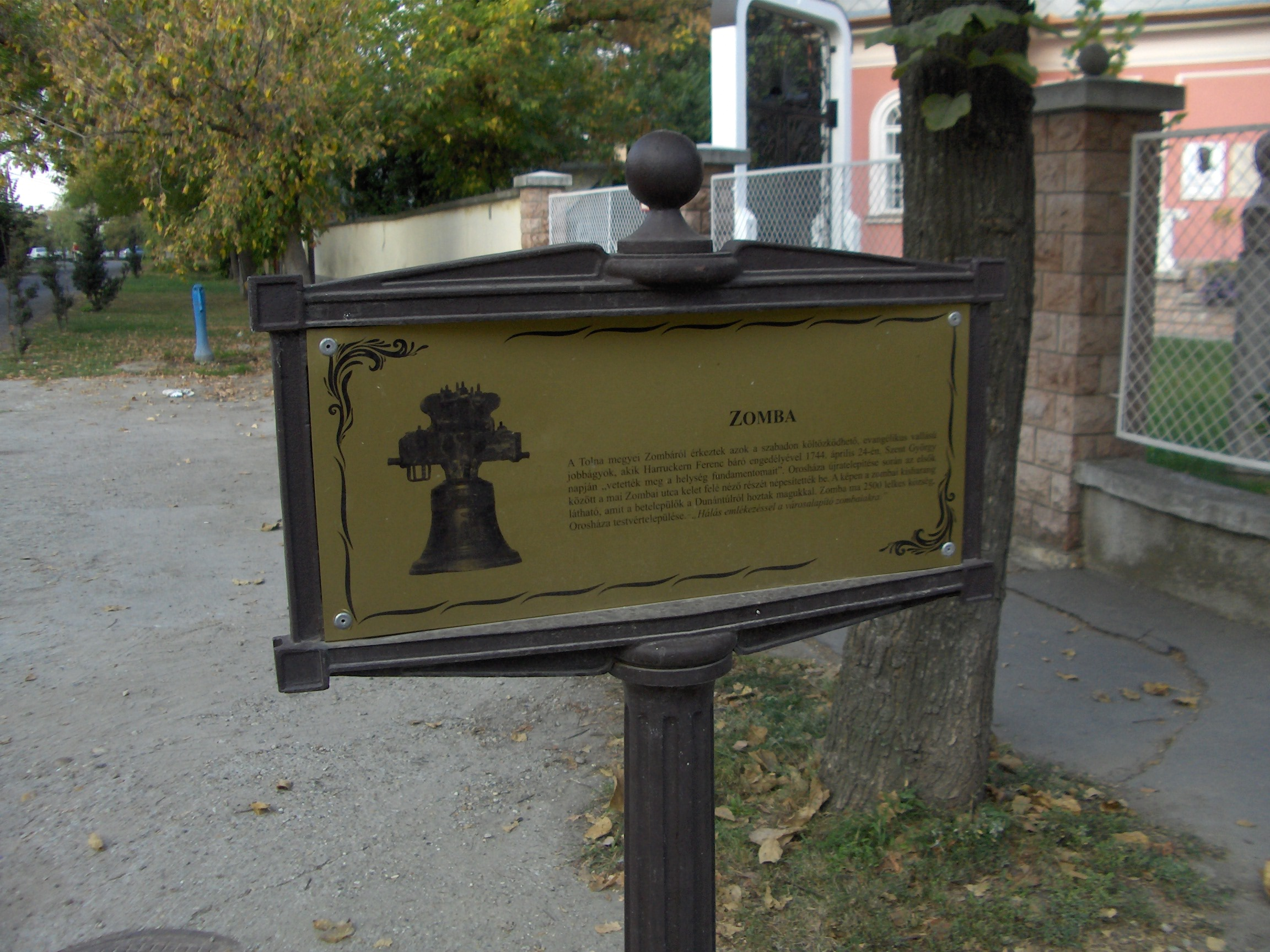
The Zombáról sign at the intersection of Zomba Street and Dózsa György Street

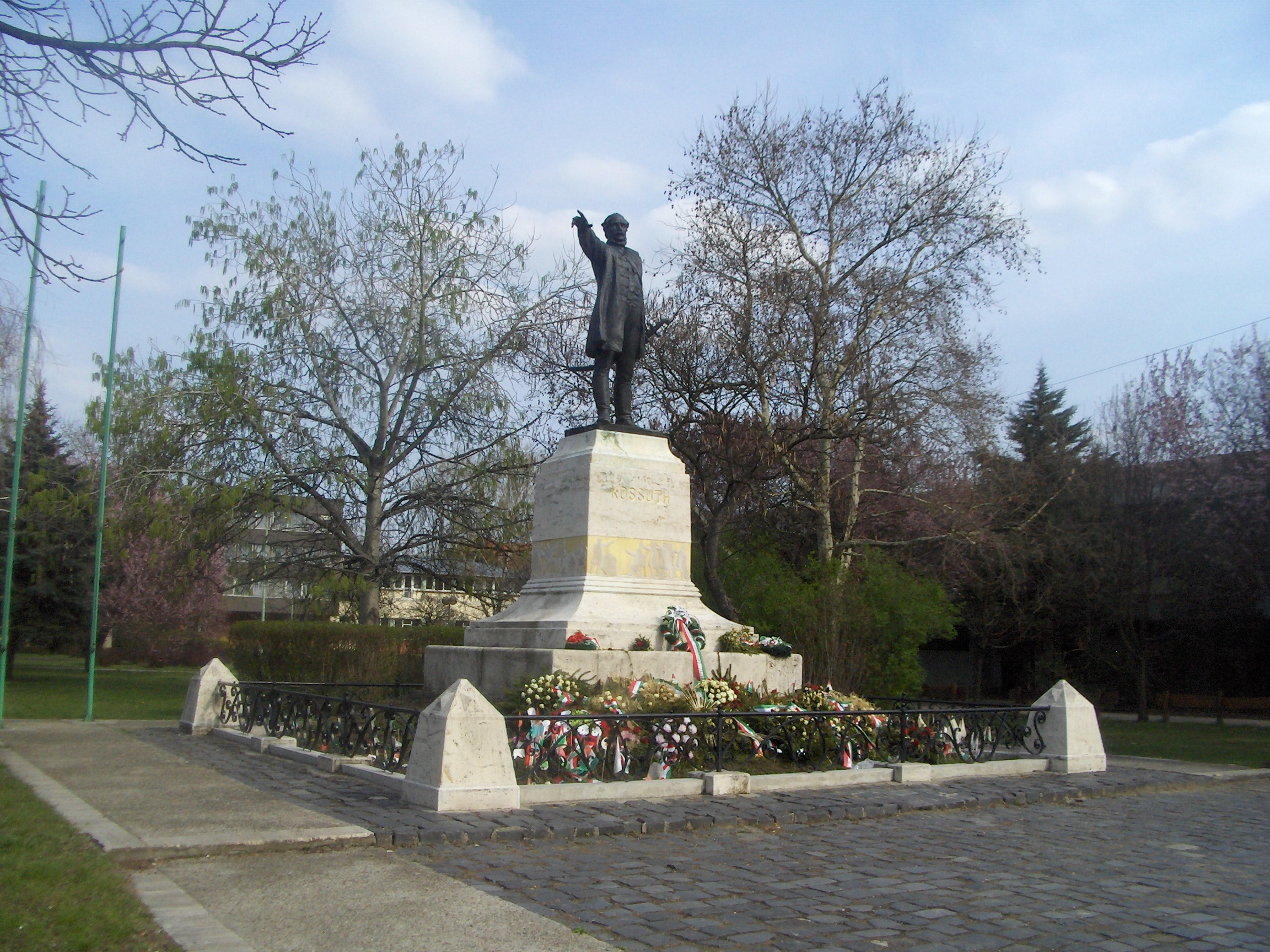
Monument of Kossuth

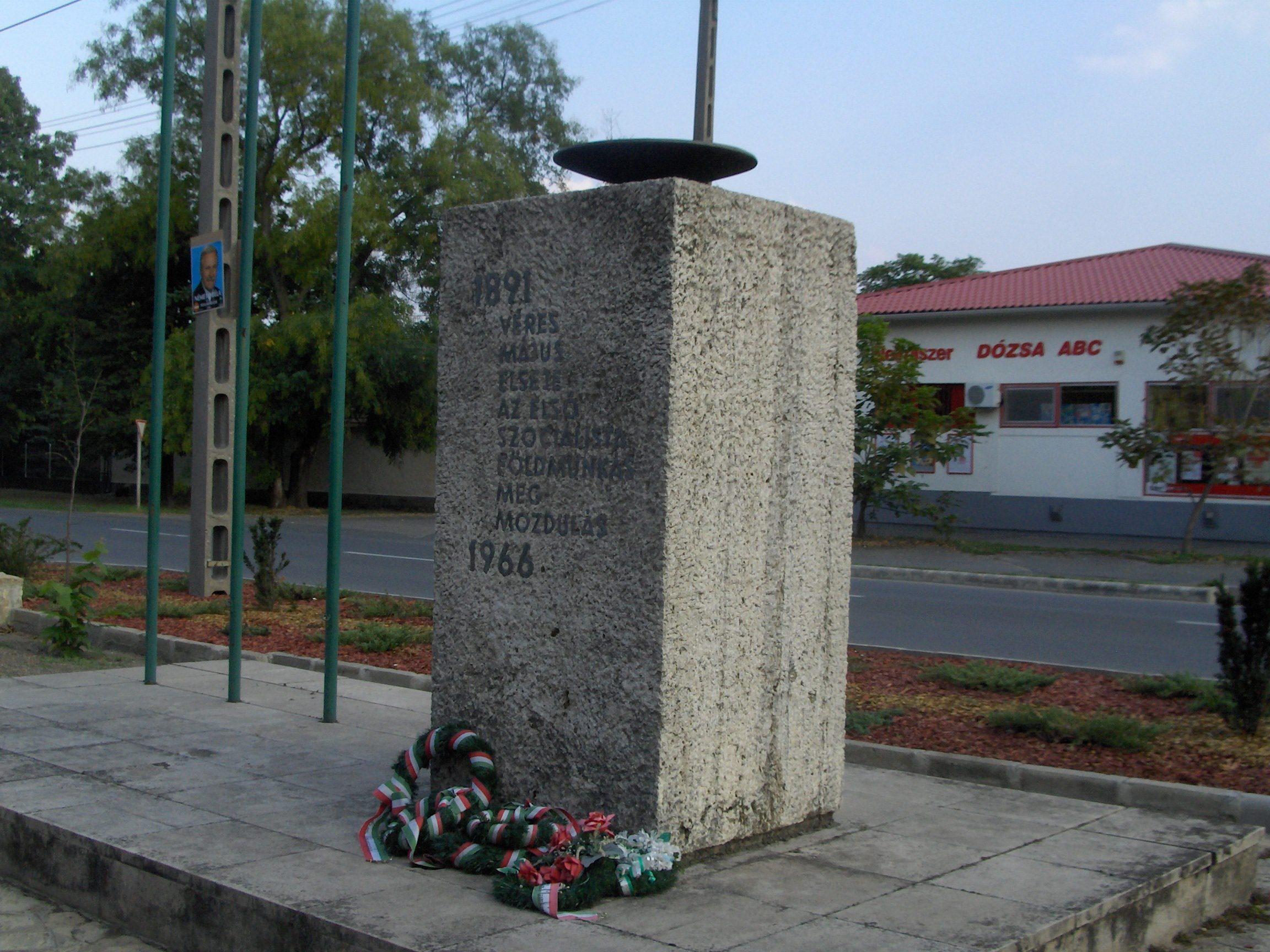
Monument of the Bloody First of May

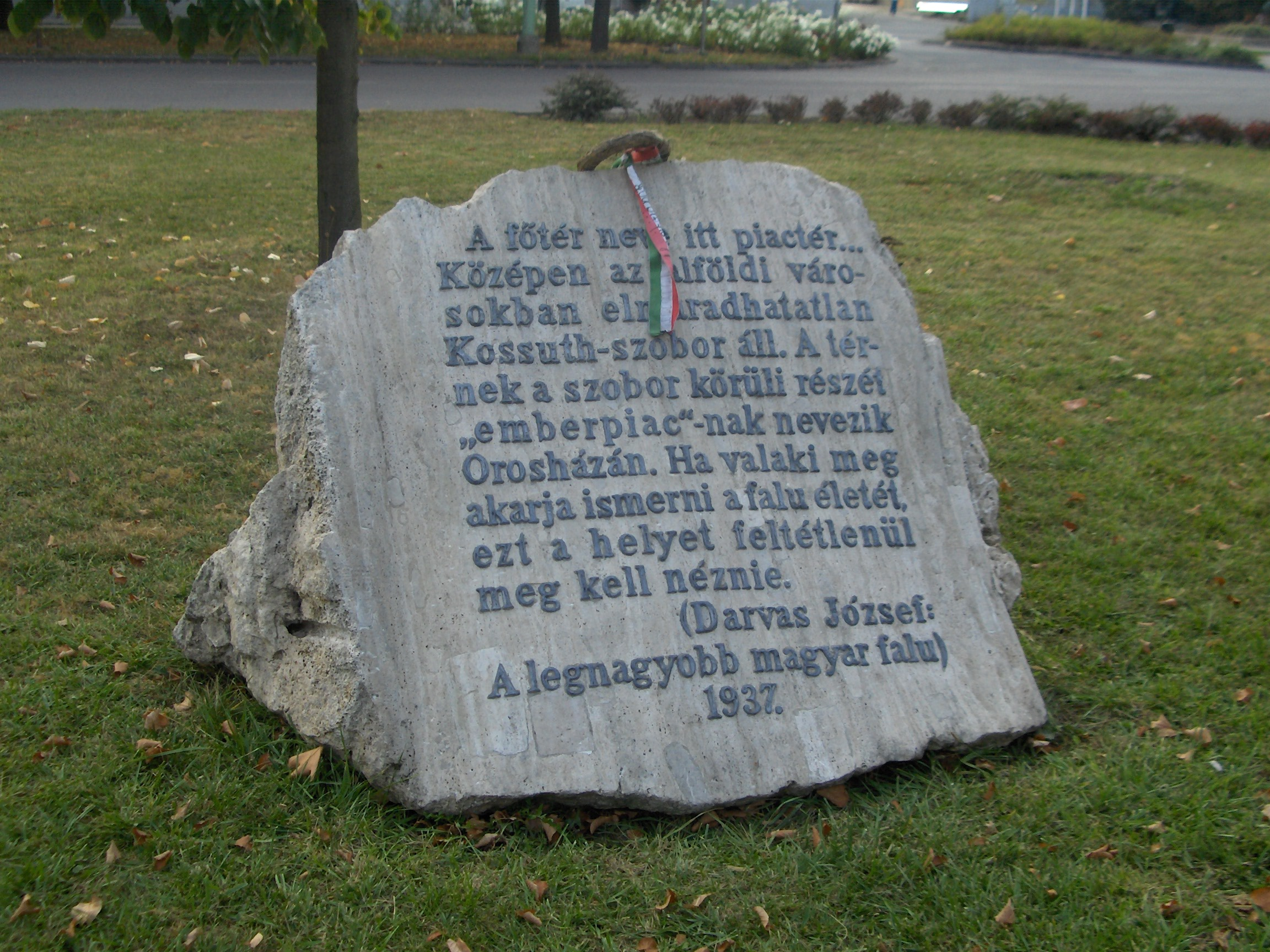
Monument of the "Biggest Hungarian Village"

== Sport ==
Oroháza has had two major football clubs. Orosházi MTK is a defunct association football club, while Orosháza FC currently plays in the Megyei Bajnokság I.

== Twin towns – sister cities ==
Orosháza is twinned with:

- Băile Tușnad, Romania (1995)
- Carei, Romania (1991)
- Kuusankoski (Kouvola), Finland (1993)
- Llanes, Spain (1987)
- Panjin, China (2006)
- Srbobran, Serbia (2005)
- Zomba, Hungary (1994)
