= István Kovács =

István Kovács may refer to:

- István Kovács (actor) (born 1944), Hungarian actor
- István Kovács (boxer) (born 1970), Hungarian Olympic boxer
- István Kovács (footballer born 1920), Romanian footballer and manager
- István Kovács (footballer, born 1992), Hungarian footballer
- István Kovács (high jumper) (born 1973), Hungarian high jumper
- István Kovács (politician) (1911–2011), Hungarian Communist politician
- István Kovács (referee) (born 1984), Romanian football referee
- István Kovács (water polo) (born 1957), Hungarian water polo coach
- István Kovács (wrestler) (born 1950), Hungarian Olympic wrestler

== See also ==
- István Kováts (1866–1945), Hungarian Lutheran pastor, writer and historian
