= László Kovács (physician) =

Hungarian physician and politician

Member of the National Assembly
- In office 2 May 1990 – 27 June 1994

Personal details
- Born: 27 March 1941 Tapolca, Hungary
- Died: 5 December 2001 (aged 60) Százhalombatta, Hungary
- Party: MDF
- Profession: X-ray physician, politician

Dr. László Kovács (27 March 1941 – 5 December 2001) was a Hungarian physician and politician, member of the National Assembly (MP) for Érd (Pest County Constituency VIII) between 1990 and 1994.
