= Gyula Kovács =

Gyula Kovács may refer to:

- Gyula Kovács (drummer) (1929–1992), Hungarian drummer and music educator
- Gyula Kovács (politician, born 1874) (1874–1963), Hungarian politician
- Gyula Kovács (21st century politician), Hungarian politician of the Tisza Party
- Gyula Kovács (wrestler) (1917–1986), Hungarian wrestler and Olympic athlete
- Gyula Kovács (footballer), Hungarian footballer for Zalaegerszegi TE
