= Edit Kovács =

Edit Kovács may refer to:

- Edit Kovács (fencer), Hungarian fencer
- Edit Kovács (swimmer), Hungarian swimmer
