= Lajos Kovács =

Lajos Kovács may refer to:

- Lajos Kovács (actor), Hungarian actor
- Lajos Kovács (footballer), Hungarian footballer and manager
- Lajos Kovács (runner), Hungarian athlete
