= Zoltán Kovács =

Zoltán Kovács may refer to:

== Politicians ==
- Zoltán Kovács (politician, born 1957), Hungarian politician, MP, former mayor of Pápa
- Zoltán Kovács (politician, born 1969), Hungarian politician, Secretary of State for Public Diplomacy and Relations

== Sportspeople ==
- Zoltán Kovács (canoeist), Hungarian canoer
- Zoltan Kovács (chess player) (born 1930), Austrian and Hungarian chess master
- Zoltan Kovács (footballer, born 1954), Croatian-born Hungarian football coach
- Zoltán Kovács (footballer, born 1973), retired Hungarian footballer
- Zoltán Kovács (footballer, born 1984), Hungarian footballer for Újpest FC
- Zoltán Kovács (footballer, born 1986) (1986–2013), Hungarian football player for REAC
- Zoltán Kovács (ice hockey) (born 1962), Hungarian ice hockey coach, and recipient of Paul Loicq Award
- Zoltán Kovács (sport shooter) (born 1964), Hungarian Olympic sport shooter
- Zoltán Kovács (weightlifter) (born 1977), Hungarian weightlifter
- Zoltán Kovács (water polo) (born 1974), Hungarian water polo player

== Others ==
- Zoltán Kovács, writer in Nocturnal Submissions
- Zoltán Kovács, developer in GeoGebra
