= Falls of the Braan =

Waterfall in Perth and Kinross, Scotland

Coordinates: 56.55486°N 3.62354°W

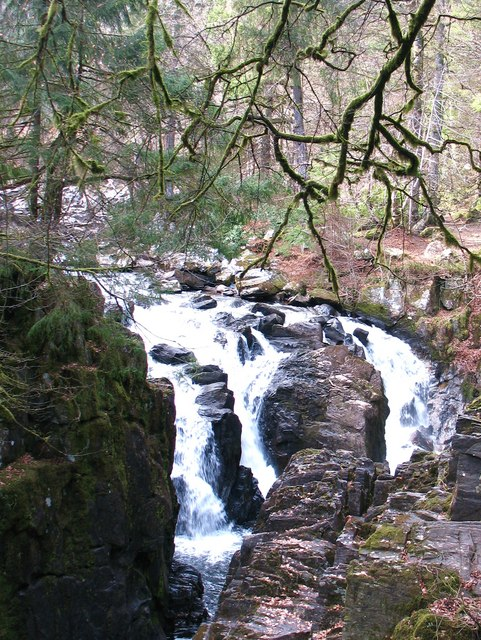
Falls of the Braan

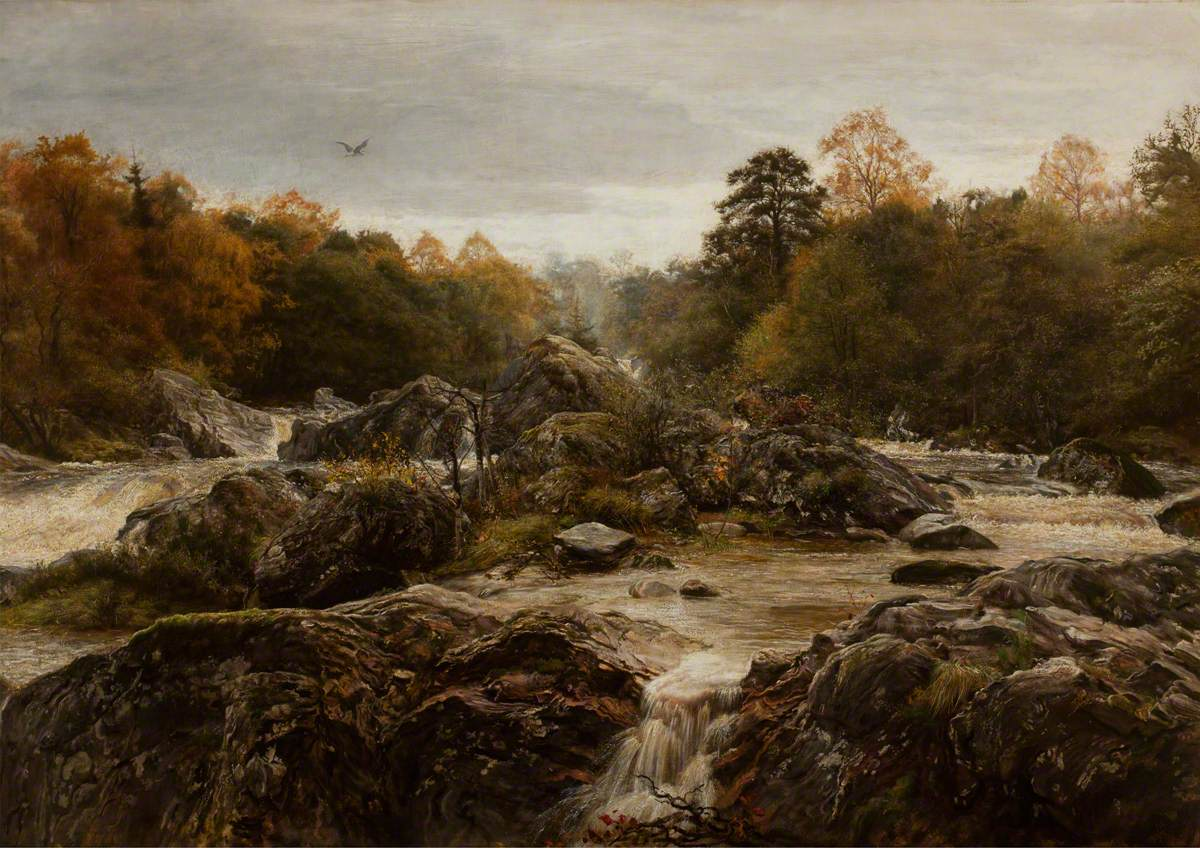
The Sound of Many Waters by John Everett Millais, 1876

Falls of the Braan is a waterfall of Scotland located in the Hermitage at the National Trust for Scotland-protected site in Dunkeld, Perth and Kinross.

== See also ==
- Waterfalls of Scotland
- List of waterfalls
