= László Kovács (actor) =

Peruvian actor

- Born: 3 December 1978; Lima, Peru

Andras Laszlo Kovacs Fernandez, credited as László Kovács (born in Lima, Peru, December 3, 1978), is a Peruvian television actor best known for his playing Tito Lara in the TV series Al Fondo Hay Sitio.

== Biography ==
Born to parents Andras Kovács Toth and Carmen Fernandez, Kovács' career began in 1997 with the telenovelas Torbellino ("Whirlwind") and Leonela, Muriendo de Amor ("Leonela, Dying of Love"). He has since appeared in a dozen different TV series and in 2005 expanded his career to include stage acting and musical theatre.

== Selected filmography ==
- Al fondo hay sitio (2009-2016; 2022-present) as Alberto "Tito" Lara Smith / "Sr. Caquetá" / "El Rey del Hielo" / "Tito Paniagua"
- De vuelta al barrio (2017-2018; 2021) as Marcelo Gustavo Guerra de La Borda y Alberto "Tito" Lara Smith
- Maricucha (2022) as Gianluca Montero
