= Zsolt Kovács =

Zsolt Kovács may refer to:

- Zsolt Kovács (biathlete) (born 1962), Hungarian Olympic biathlete
- Zsolt Kovács (footballer) (born 1986), Hungarian footballer
- Zsolt Kézdi-Kovács (1936–2014), Hungarian film director
