= Zsófia Kovács =

Zsófia Kovács may refer to:

- Zsófia Kovács (triathlete) (born 1988), Hungarian triathlete
- Zsófia Kovács (gymnast) (born 2000), Hungarian gymnast
