= János Kovács (geologist) =

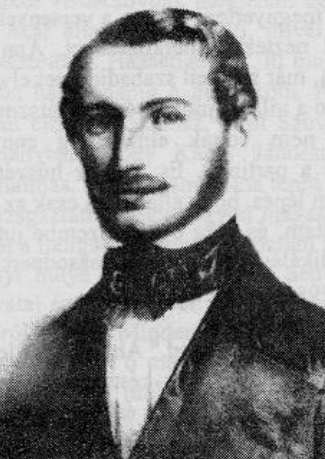

János Kovács (13 November 1816 – 7 December 1906) was a Hungarian geologist, paleontologist, speleologist, naturalist and educator. He was one of the first Hungarians to travel to Africa.

Kovács was born in Szeghalom. He studied at the Debrecen Reformed College (1833). In 1884 he was proposed as a private tutor to the family of Count Lajos Tisza in Geszt by Pál Szőnyi. He then went to improve his knowledge on various subjects, attending lectures at Vienna, Berlin and Tübingen. He then became a tutor in 1846, to the four sons of Count Tisza - Kálmán, László, Lajos and Domokos. He taught them natural sciences, as well as horse-riding and fencing. He also began to collect natural history specimens, working along with János Arany. He also travelled with his students on collecting trips. In 1850, the youngest Domokos was diagnosed with tuberculosis and prescribed a warmer climate, so he accompanied the boy and they travelled to Egypt by the steamship Calcutta. Domokos Tisza however died in Egypt from tuberculosis in 1856. They collected specimens in the region that went into Hungarian museums. Kovács also collected fossils and geological specimens, also exploring the caves of the Körös region. The beetle Drymeotus kovacsi was named after him. From 1856 he taught at the Debrecen reformed college. He established a college museum. He was a founding member of the Debrecen Horticultural Society. He gave many talks including on the theory of evolution. He became a corresponding member of the Vienna geological society in 1867. He retired in 1896 to Érmellék. His grandson Erno Andrassy also became a naturalist and museum builder.
