= Miklós Kovács (automobile designer) =

Hungarian car designer

- Occupation: Automotive Designer
- Known for: Automotive Design

Miklós Kovács is a Hungarian car designer, notable for leading the design team of the model Kia Cee'd in Frankfurt, Germany.

He graduated in 1995 in Pforzheim, Germany as an automotive designer. Before working for Kia, Kovács worked for Audi.

== Notable works ==
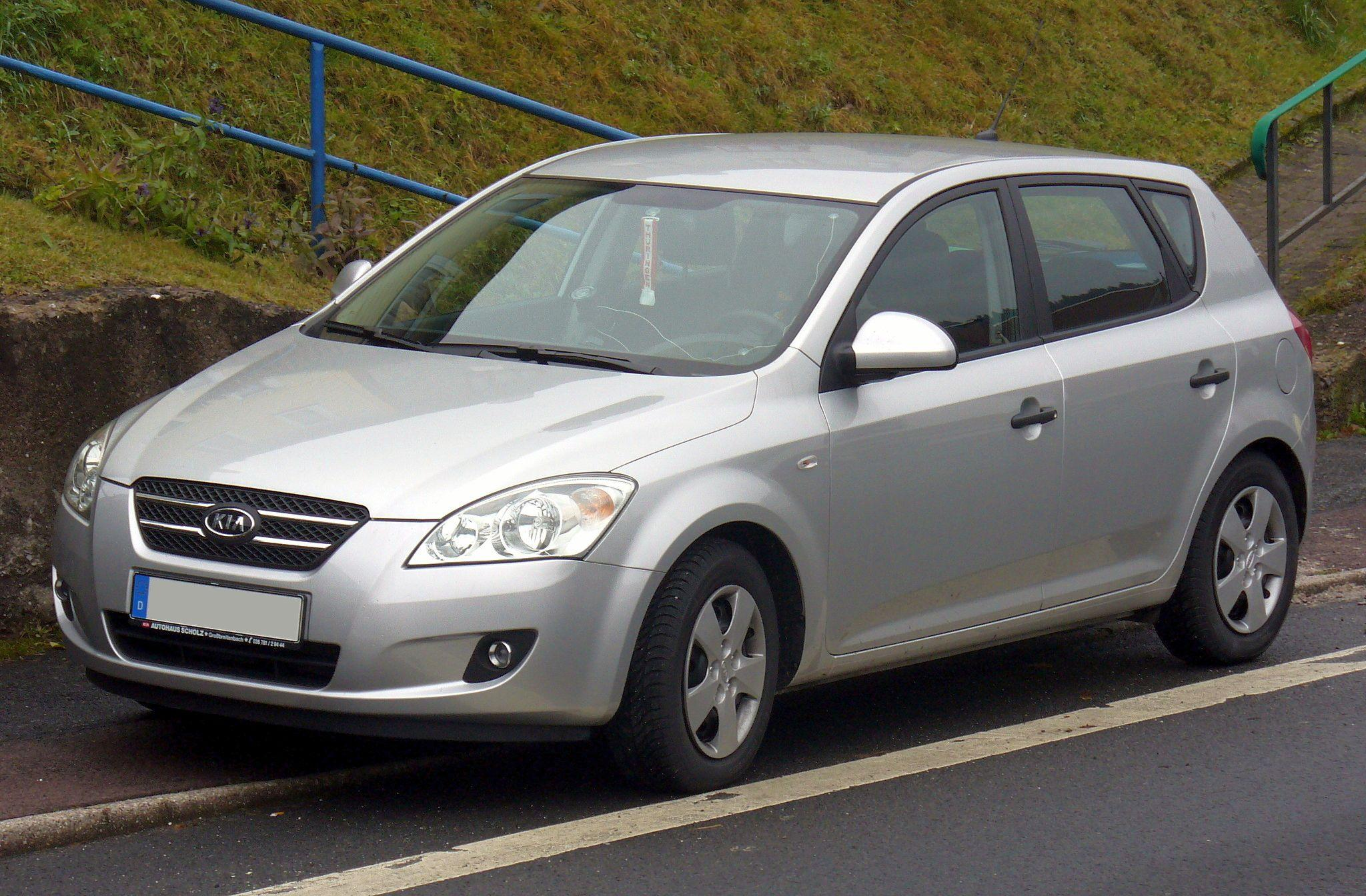
1st generation Kia cee'd

- Kia cee'd (ED; 2006)
