= Tamás Kovács =

Tamás Kovács may refer to:

- Tamás Kovács (athlete) (born 1983), Hungarian Olympic long-distance runner
- Tamás Kovács (fencer) (born 1943), Hungarian Olympic fencer
- Tamás Kovács (judoka) (born 1978), Hungarian judoka
- Tamás Kovács (jurist) (1940–2020), Chief Prosecutor of Hungary (2006–2010)
- Tamás Kovács-Csatlós (born 1989), Hungarian water polo referee
