= Ákos Kovács =

Ákos Kovács may refer to:

- Ákos Kovács (radiologist) (1903–1980), Hungarian radiologist
- Ákos Kovács (singer) (born 1968), Hungarian singer
- Ákos Kovács, a character from the 1995 film The Usual Suspects
