= Richard Kovacs =

American physician

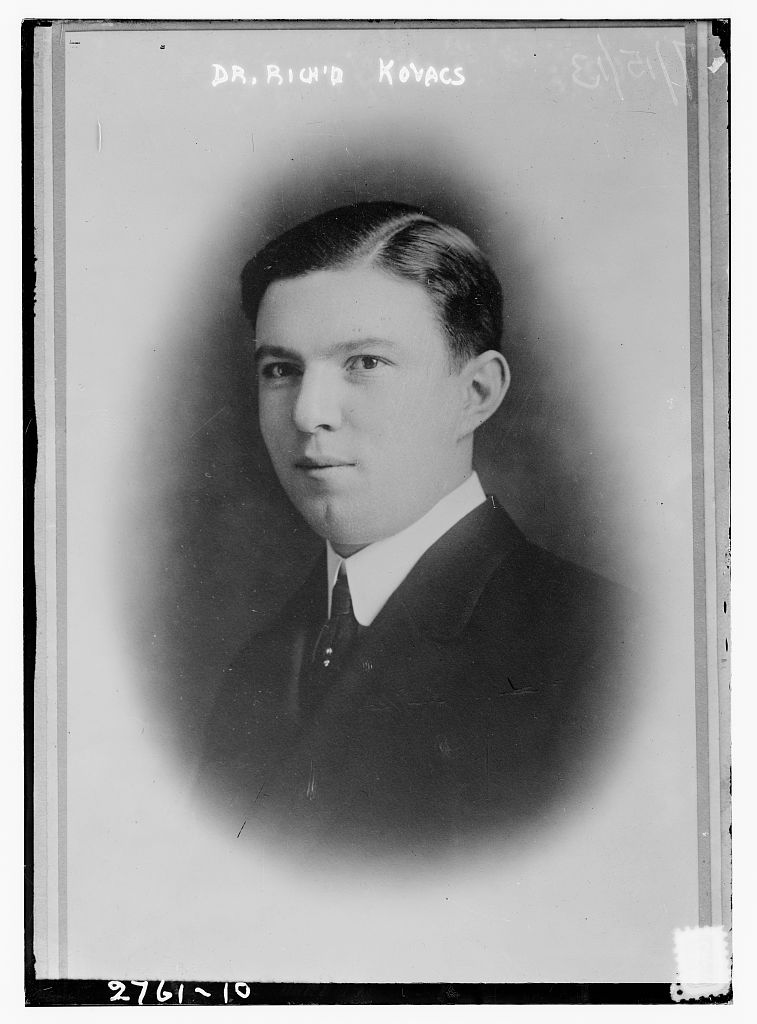
- Kovacs circa 1915
- Born: May 5, 1884; New York City
- Died: December 29, 1950 (aged 66); New York Hospital
- Occupation: Physician

Richard Kovacs (May 5, 1884 – December 29, 1950) was a physician who pioneered diathermy as a therapy. In 1945, he was lamenting the rapid disappearance of American spas.

== Writings ==
- German Spas: Neuenahr, Wiesbaden, Baden-Baden as Seen by the Travel Study Club of American Physicians (1926)
- Accidental Injuries in Office Practice (1933) in The Journal of the American Medical Association
