= Zollie Kovacs =

Canadian football player (born 1935)

Profile
- Position: Guard

Personal information
- Born: c. 1935
- Listed height: 6 ft 0 in (1.83 m)
- Listed weight: 225 lb (102 kg)

Career history
- 1955–1957: Hamilton Tiger-Cats

Awards and highlights
- Grey Cup champion (1957)

Zollie Kovacs (born c. 1935) was a Canadian professional football player who played for the Hamilton Tiger-Cats. He won the Grey Cup with them in 1957. He previously played football at and attended the University of Ottawa.
