= Ferenc Kovács (politician, born 1953) =

Hungarian politician

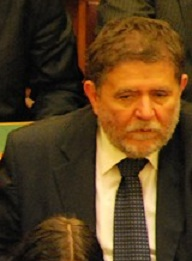

Member of the National Assembly
- In office 18 June 1998 – 5 May 2014

Personal details
- Born: 1 November 1953 (age 72) Budapest, Hungary
- Party: Fidesz (since 1992)
- Children: 3
- Profession: politician

Ferenc Kovács (born 1 November 1953) is a Hungarian politician, member of the National Assembly (MP) for Sárvár (Vas County Constituency IV) from 1998 to 2014. He is the current President of the General Assembly of Vas County from 2006.

He joined Fidesz in 1992. Kovács was a member of the Committee on Sport and Tourism since 2006. He was one of the key people of the Castle Rescue Program and Chairman of the Subcommittee on Castles, Mansions and Fortresses. In September 2013, he was dismissed as chairman of the Fidesz's Sárvár branch by the party's central leadership. According to press reports, the relationship between Kovács and fellow Fidesz member from Vas County, and also Minister of Defence, Csaba Hende, was tense and conflictual in the previous years.

== Personal life ==
He is married and has three children.
