= Dan Kovacs =

American powerlifter (born 1970)

- Born: Dan Kovacs
- Occupation: Powerlifting
- Known for: IPA Raw 308 Powerlifting World Champion

Dan Kovacs (born 1970) is an American competitor in the sport of powerlifting. He once held the world record for the IPA raw total at 308 pounds with a total of 2202 pounds.

He began weightlifting in high school and played football at Indiana University of Pennsylvania. He won Pennsylvania state powerlifting championships three consecutive seasons and went on to compete nationally, he set world records in bench press and combined totals at the International Powerlifting Association's Senior National Powerlifting Championships in New Carrollton, Maryland in 1996.

In 1997, when living in Mt. Lebanon, Pennsylvania, he won again at the same competition. He had worked with a nutritional adviser to keep his weight down in the offseason.

He won for a third straight year in 1998, despite injuries during his training earlier in the year. His regimen included working out for two hours, three times a week.

Kovacs worked full time as a corrections officer for Allegheny County and has diabetes.
