= 2007–08 Neftchi Baku PFK season =

Neftchi Baku
2007–08 season
- Chairman: Sadyg Sadygov
- Manager: Gurban Gurbanov until 2 September 2007; Vlastimil Petržela; 2 September 2007 - 5 January 2008; Gurban Gurbanov from 5 January 2008
- Stadium: Tofik Bakhramov Stadium
- Premier League: 3rd
- Azerbaijan Cup: Semi-finals vs Inter Baku
- UEFA Cup: First qualifying round vs SV Ried
- Top goalscorer: Branimir Subašić (14)
Home colours	Away colours

The Neftchi Baku 2007–08 season was Neftchi Baku's sixteenth Azerbaijan Premier League season. They started the season under the management of Gurban Gurbanov, who was replaced by Vlastimil Petržela after the UEFA Cup qualifiers at the start of September. Petržela was replaced by Anatoliy Demyanenko on 5 January 2008. They finished 3rd in the league and were knocked out of the Azerbaijan Cup at the semifinal stage by Inter Baku. Neftchi also took part in the UEFA Cup, being eliminated at the First qualifying round by SV Ried of Austria.

== Squad ==
Note: Flags indicate national team as defined under FIFA eligibility rules; some limited exceptions apply. Players may hold more than one non-FIFA nationality.

No.	Pos.	Nation	Player
1	GK	SRB	Vladimir Mićović
2	DF	AZE	Rail Malikov
4	MF	AZE	Namiq Yusifov
5	DF	AZE	Elnur Allahverdiyev
6	MF	AZE	Rashad Sadiqov
7	MF	MDA	Vadim Boreț
8	MF	AZE	Aleksandr Chertoganov
9	FW	AZE	Samir Aliyev
10	FW	GEO	Georgi Adamia
11	MF	AZE	Ramazan Abbasov
12	GK	AZE	Huseyn Mahammadov
14	DF	AZE	Rashad Sadygov

No.	Pos.	Nation	Player
16	MF	AZE	Eshgin Guliyev
17	MF	AZE	Agil Mammadov
20	FW	AZE	Branimir Subašić
21	FW	AZE	Zaur Tagizade
22	MF	AZE	Marcos (loan from FK Karvan)
25	DF	EST	Dmitri Kruglov (loan from Lokomotiv Moscow)
32	MF	TKM	Nazar Baýramow
55	GK	AZE	Ruslan Majidov
77	DF	AZE	Ramin Guliyev
—	DF	AZE	Ruslan Abishov
—	MF	AZE	Ramal Huseynov (loan from FK Baku)
—	MF	BUL	Svetoslav Petrov

== Transfers ==
=== Summer ===
In: Note: Flags indicate national team as defined under FIFA eligibility rules; some limited exceptions apply. Players may hold more than one non-FIFA nationality.

No.	Pos.	Nation	Player
2	DF	AZE	Rail Malikov (from (Azerbaijan) Baku)
4	MF	AZE	Namiq Yusifov (from (Azerbaijan) Qarabağ)
11	MF	AZE	Ramazan Abbasov (from (Azerbaijan) MOIK Baku)
17	MF	AZE	Agil Mammadov (from (Azerbaijan) Baku)
25	MF	AZE	Zeynal Zeynalov (from (Azerbaijan) MKT Araz)
32	MF	TKM	Nazar Baýramow (from (Azerbaijan) FK Karvan)
55	GK	AZE	Ruslan Majidov (from (Poland) Widzew Łódź)
77	DF	AZE	Ramin Guliyev (from (Azerbaijan) Baku)

Out: Note: Flags indicate national team as defined under FIFA eligibility rules; some limited exceptions apply. Players may hold more than one non-FIFA nationality.

No.	Pos.	Nation	Player
—	DF	AZE	Ruslan Abbasov (to (Azerbaijan) Inter Baku)
—	DF	AZE	Igor Getman (Retired)
—	DF	AZE	Aftandil Hajiyev (to (Azerbaijan) Qarabağ)
—	DF	AZE	Mahir Shukurov (to (Azerbaijan) Inter Baku)
—	MF	BUL	Svetoslav Petrov (loan to (China) Changchun Yatai)
—	FW	AZE	Farrukh Ismayilov (to (Azerbaijan) Olimpik Baku)

=== Winter ===
In: Note: Flags indicate national team as defined under FIFA eligibility rules; some limited exceptions apply. Players may hold more than one non-FIFA nationality.

No.	Pos.	Nation	Player
22	MF	AZE	Marcos (loan from (Azerbaijan) FK Karvan)
25	MF	EST	Dmitri Kruglov (loan from (Russia) Lokomotiv Moscow)
—	MF	AZE	Ramal Huseynov (loan from (Azerbaijan) FK Baku)
—	MF	BUL	Svetoslav Petrov (loan return from (China) Changchun Yatai)
—	FW	BRA	José Carlos (from (Brazil) Brasília)

Out: Note: Flags indicate national team as defined under FIFA eligibility rules; some limited exceptions apply. Players may hold more than one non-FIFA nationality.

No.	Pos.	Nation	Player
25	MF	AZE	Zeynal Zeynalov (to (Azerbaijan) FK Karvan)
55	GK	AZE	Ruslan Majidov (to (Azerbaijan) Gänclärbirliyi Sumqayit)
—	FW	AZE	Nadir Nabiyev (to (Azerbaijan) Khazar Lankaran)

== Competitions ==
=== Azerbaijan Premier League ===
==== Results ====
11 August 2007 1	Neftchi Baku	1 – 2	Turan Tovuz	Baku
17:00 AZST (UTC+5)	Subašić 13'	Summary	E.Mammadov 69'; Gadiri 84'	Stadium: Tofik Bakhramov Stadium

18 August 2007 2	Gänclärbirliyi Sumqayit	2 – 6	Neftchi Baku	Sumqayit
17:00 AZST (UTC+5)	Paşayev 51'; Stanić 56' (pen.)	Summary	Tagizade 9'; Subašić 34', 39', 47'; Allahverdiyev 52'; Adamia 90'	Stadium: Mehdi Huseynzade Stadium

26 August 2007 3	Neftchi Baku	2 – 0	Gabala	Baku
18:00 AZST (UTC+5)	Mammadov 25'; Subašić 88'	Summary		Stadium: Tofik Bakhramov Stadium

2 September 2007 4	Inter Baku	0 – 0	Neftchi Baku	Baku
18:00 AZST (UTC+5)		Summary		Stadium: Zabrat Stadium

16 September 2007 5	Neftchi Baku	3 – 1	Standard Baku	Baku
18:00 AZST (UTC+5)	Sadygov 5', 42'; Subašić 71'	Summary	Da Silva 3'	Stadium: Tofik Bakhramov Stadium

23 September 2007 6	Baku	5 – 1	Neftchi Baku	Baku
17:00 AZST (UTC+5)	Sadiqov (.)	Summary	Amirbekov (.)	Stadium: Tofig Bakhramov Stadium

29 September 2007 7	Neftchi Baku	4 – 0	FK Masallı	Baku
18:00 AZST (UTC+5)	Subašić; Adamia; Sadygov	Summary		Stadium: Tofik Bakhramov Stadium

6 October 2007 8	Neftchi Baku	0 – 0	Olimpik Baku	Baku
15:00 AZST (UTC+5)		Summary		Stadium: Tofik Bakhramov Stadium

27 October 2007 9	Simurq	1 – 2	Neftchi Baku	Zaqatala
21:25 AZT (UTC+4)	Mazyar 51'	Summary	Sadygov 36' (pen.), 61'	Stadium: Zaqatala City Stadium

3 November 2007 10	Neftchi Baku	2 – 1	FK Karvan	Baku
15:00 AZT (UTC+4)	Tagizade 8'; Subašić 64'	Summary	Garadanow 88'	Stadium: Tofik Bakhramov Stadium

10 November 2007 11	Khazar Lankaran	0 – 1	Neftchi Baku	Lankaran
15:00 AZT (UTC+4)		Summary	Adamia 1'	Stadium: Lankaran City Stadium

25 November 2007 12	Neftchi Baku	0 – 0	Qarabağ	Baku
15:00 AZT (UTC+4)		Summary		Stadium: Tofik Bakhramov Stadium

1 December 2007 13	ABN Bärdä	0 – 2	Neftchi Baku	Barda City Stadium
15:00 AZT (UTC+4)		Summary	Subašić 19', 26' (pen.)	Attendance: Barda

17 February 2008 14	Turan Tovuz	0 – 1	Neftchi Baku	Tovuz
15:00 AZT (UTC+4)		Summary	Allahverdiyev 30'	Stadium: Tovuz City Stadium

23 February 2008 15	Neftchi Baku	2 – 0	Gänclärbirliyi Sumqayit	Baku
17:00 AZT (UTC+4)	Tagizade 7'; Subašić 15'	Summary		Stadium: Tofik Bakhramov Stadium

2 March 2008 16	Gabala	2 – 3	Neftchi Baku	Qabala
15:00 AZT (UTC+4)	Taranu 55'; Tebloyev 71'	Summary	Subašić 30'; Kruglov 46'; Adamia 90' (pen.)	Stadium: Gabala City Stadium

15 March 2008 17	Neftchi Baku	2 – 0	Inter Baku	Baku
17:15 AZT (UTC+4)	Kruglov 27'; Subašić 79'	Summary		Stadium: Tofik Bakhramov Stadium

30 March 2008 19	Neftchi Baku	3 – 2	Baku	Baku
18:00 AZST (UTC+5)	Subašić 3'; Adamia 28'; Kruglov 31'	Summary	Gomes 22'; Pérez 76'	Stadium: Tofiq Bahramov Stadium

5 April 2008 18	FK Masallı	0 – 2	Neftchi Baku	Masallı
16:00 AZST (UTC+5)		Summary	Adamia 45', 85'	Stadium: Anatoliy Banishevskiy Stadium

13 April 2008 20	Olimpik Baku	0 – 0	Neftchi Baku	Baku
16:00 AZST (UTC+5)		Summary		Stadium: Shafa Stadium

19 April 2008 21	Simurq	0 – 0	Neftchi Baku	Zaqatala
16:00 AZST (UTC+5)		Summary		Stadium: Zaqatala City Stadium

27 April 2008 22	Standard Baku	1 – 1	Neftchi Baku	Baku
18:00 AZST (UTC+5)	Martínez 24'	Summary	Adamia 18'	Stadium: Shafa Stadium

4 May 2008 23	FK Karvan	0 – 1	Neftchi Baku	Yevlakh
17:00 AZST (UTC+5)		Summary	Adamia 53'	Stadium: Yevlakh Stadium

11 May 2008 24	Neftchi Baku	0 – 1	Khazar Lankaran	Baku
20:00 AZST (UTC+5)		Summary	Abdullayev 14'	Stadium: Tofiq Bahramov Stadium

17 May 2008 25	Qarabağ	0 – 0	Neftchi Baku	Baku
17:00 AZST (UTC+5)		Summary		Stadium: Tofiq Bahramov Stadium^{1}

28 May 2008 26	Neftchi Baku	3 – 0^{2}	ABN Bärdä	Baku
17:00 AZST (UTC+5)		Summary		Stadium: Tofiq Bahramov Stadium

==== Table ====
Pos	Team	Pld	W	D	L	GF	GA	GD	Pts	Qualification or relegation
1	Inter Baku (C)	26	18	4	4	55	18	+37	58	Qualification for Champions League first qualifying round
2	Olimpik Baku	26	17	7	2	29	7	+22	58	Qualification for UEFA Cup first qualifying round (Note: Khazar Lankaran qualified for the first qualifiying round of the 1st qualifying round of the UEFA Cup as winners of the 2007–08 Azerbaijan Cup.)
3	Neftçi Baku	26	16	7	3	42	18	+24	55	Qualification for Intertoto Cup first round
4	Khazar Lankaran	26	14	10	2	44	16	+28	52	Qualification for UEFA Cup first qualifying round
5	Qarabağ	26	11	8	7	25	16	+9	41	

Source: Azerbaijan Professional Football league
Rules for classification: 1) points; 2) goal difference; 3) number of goals scored.
(C) Champions

=== Azerbaijan Cup ===
26 September 2007 First round 1st leg	Shahdag	0 – 7	Neftchi Baku	Qusar
AZST (UTC+5)		[ Summary]	Guseinov 57'	Stadium: Shovkat Ordukhanov Stadium

3 October 2007 First round 2nd leg	Neftchi Baku	1 – 0 (8 – 0 agg.)	Shahdag	Baku
AZST (UTC+5)	Goal	[ Summary]		Stadium: Tofik Bakhramov Stadium

25 October 2007 Last 16 1st leg	Neftchi Baku	3 – 0	Absheron	Baku
AZT (UTC+4)	Nabiyev 6'; S.Aliyev 72'; Abbasov 79'	Summary		Stadium: Tofik Bakhramov Stadium

1 November 2007 Last 16 2nd leg	Absheron	0 – 1 (0 – 4 agg.)	Neftchi Baku	Baku
AZT (UTC+4)		Summary	Güləşçi 29'	Stadium: Dalga Arena

7 March 2008 Quarterfinals 1st leg	Neftchi Baku	4 – 1	Standard Baku	Baku
17:00 AZT (UTC+4)	Petrov 21'; Adamia 57' (pen.), 69', 90+1'	Summary	Martínez 75'	Stadium: Tofik Bakhramov Stadium

20 March 2008 Quarterfinals 2nd leg	StandardBaku	0 – 1 (1 – 5 agg.)	Neftchi Baku	Baku
17:00 AZT (UTC+4)		Summary	57'	Stadium: Shafa Stadium

9 April 2008 Semifinals 1st leg	Neftchi Baku	2 – 2	Inter Baku	Baku
17:00 AZST (UTC+5)	Goal	Summary	Goal	Stadium: Tofik Bakhramov Stadium

23 April 2008 Semifinals 2nd leg	Inter Baku	1 – 0 (3 – 2 agg.)	Neftchi Baku	Baku
17:00 AZST (UTC+5)	Huseynov 57'	Summary		Stadium: Shafa Stadium

=== UEFA Cup ===
==== Qualifying rounds ====
19 July 2007 First qualifying round 1st leg	SV Ried (Austria)	3 – 1	(Azerbaijan) Neftchi Baku	Ried im Innkreis, Austria
23:30 AZST (UTC+5)	Drechsel 14'; Brenner 87'; Salihi 90+1'	Report	S.Aliyev 14'	Stadium: Keine Sorgen Arena; Referee: Antonio Rubinos Perez (Spain)

2 August 2007 First qualifying round 2nd leg	Neftchi Baku (Azerbaijan)	2 – 1 (3 – 4 agg.)	(Austria) SV Ried	Baku, Azerbaijan
21:00 AZST (UTC+5)	Subašić 14'; Sadygov 21'; Tagizade (yellow card) 43' (yellow-red card) 82'	Report	Salihi 85'	Stadium: Tofik Bakhramov Stadium; Referee: Hristo Ristoskov (Bulgaria)

== Squad statistics ==
=== Appearances and goals ===
No.	Pos	Nat	Player	Total		Premier League		Azerbaijan Cup		UEFA Cup	
No.	Pos	Nat	Player	Apps	Goals	Apps	Goals	Apps	Goals	Apps	Goals
1	GK	(Serbia) SRB	Vladimir Mićović	24	0	22	0	0	0	2	0
2	DF	(Azerbaijan) AZE	Rail Malikov	23	0	21	0	0	0	2	0
4	MF	(Azerbaijan) AZE	Namiq Yusifov	4	0	3	0	0	0	1	0
5	DF	(Azerbaijan) AZE	Elnur Allahverdiyev	23	2	21	2	0	0	2	0
6	MF	(Azerbaijan) AZE	Rashad Sadiqov	21	0	19	0	0	0	2	0
7	MF	(Moldova) MDA	Vadim Boreț	22	0	20	0	0	0	2	0
8	MF	(Azerbaijan) AZE	Aleksandr Chertoganov	22	0	22	0	0	0	0	0
9	FW	(Azerbaijan) AZE	Samir Aliyev	13	3	11	2	0	0	2	1
10	FW	(Georgia (country)) GEO	Georgi Adamia	27	9	25	9	0	0	2	0
11	MF	(Azerbaijan) AZE	Ramazan Abbasov	12	0	12	0	0	0	0	0
12	GK	(Azerbaijan) AZE	Huseyn Mahammadov	2	0	2	0	0	0	0	0
14	DF	(Azerbaijan) AZE	Rashad Sadygov	21	6	19	5	0	0	2	1
16	MF	(Azerbaijan) AZE	Eshgin Guliyev	1	0	1	0	0	0	0	0
17	MF	(Azerbaijan) AZE	Agil Mammadov	24	1	22	1	0	0	2	0
20	FW	(Azerbaijan) AZE	Branimir Subašić	27	15	25	14	0	0	2	1
21	FW	(Azerbaijan) AZE	Zaur Tagizade	21	3	19	3	0	0	2	0
22	MF	(Azerbaijan) AZE	Marcos	4	0	4	0	0	0	0	0
25	DF	(Estonia) EST	Dmitri Kruglov	10	2	10	2	0	0	0	0
32	MF	(Turkmenistan) TKM	Nazar Baýramow	16	0	14	0	0	0	2	0
77	DF	(Azerbaijan) AZE	Ramin Guliyev	16	0	14	0	0	0	2	0
	DF	(Azerbaijan) AZE	Ruslan Abishov	12	0	12	0	0	0	0	0
	MF	(Azerbaijan) AZE	Ramal Huseynov	3	0	3	0	0	0	0	0
	MF	(Bulgaria) BUL	Svetoslav Petrov	8	0	8	0	0	0	0	0
	MF	(Brazil) BRA	José Carlos	10	0	10	0	0	0	0	0
Players who appeared for Neftchi Baku who left during the season:
25	MF	(Azerbaijan) AZE	Zeynal Zeynalov	1	0	1	0	0	0	0	0
55	GK	(Azerbaijan) AZE	Ruslan Majidov	1	0	1	0	0	0	0	0
	FW	(Azerbaijan) AZE	Nadir Nabiyev	6	0	5	0	0	0	1	0

=== Goal scorers ===
Place	Position	Nation	Number	Name	Premier League	Azerbaijan Cup	UEFA Cup	Total
1	FW	(Azerbaijan)	20	Branimir Subašić	14	0	1	15
2	FW	(Georgia (country))	10	Georgi Adamia	9	3	0	12
3	DF	(Azerbaijan)	14	Rashad Sadygov	5	0	1	6
4	FW	(Azerbaijan)	9	Samir Aliyev	2	1	1	4
5	MF	(Azerbaijan)	21	Zaur Tagizade	3	0	0	3
6	DF	(Azerbaijan)	5	Elnur Allahverdiyev	2	0	0	2
6	DF	(Estonia)	25	Dmitri Kruglov	2	0	0	2
8	MF	(Azerbaijan)	17	Agil Mammadov	1	0	0	1
8	MF	(Bulgaria)		Svetoslav Petrov	0	1	0	1
8	FW	(Azerbaijan)		Nadir Nabiyev	0	1	0	1
8	DF	(Azerbaijan)	11	Ramazan Abbasov	0	1	0	1
8				Own goal	1	0	0	1
				Awarded	3	0	0	3
				Unknown	0	11	0	14
				TOTALS	42	18	3	63

== Notes ==
- Qarabağ have played their home games at the Tofiq Bahramov Stadium since 1993 due to the ongoing situation in Quzanlı.
- Neftchi Baku awarded the win.
