= 2006–07 Neftchi Baku PFK season =

Neftchi Baku
2006–07 season
- Chairman: Sadyg Sadygov
- Manager: Gurban Gurbanov
- Stadium: Tofik Bakhramov Stadium
- Premier League: 2nd
- Azerbaijan Cup: Semifinals vs MKT Araz
- Top goalscorer: Georgi Adamia (10)
Home colours	Away colours

The Neftchi Baku 2006–07 season was Neftchi Baku's fifteenth Azerbaijan Premier League season. This was their first, and only, season with Gurban Gurbanov as their manager. They finished 2nd in the league behind Khazar Lankaran and were knocked out of the Azerbaijan Cup at the semifinal stage by MKT Araz.

== Squad ==
Note: Flags indicate national team as defined under FIFA eligibility rules; some limited exceptions apply. Players may hold more than one non-FIFA nationality.

No.	Pos.	Nation	Player
—	GK	SRB	Vladimir Mićović
—	GK	AZE	Huseyn Mahammadov
—	DF	AZE	Ruslan Abbasov
—	DF	AZE	Ruslan Abishov
—	DF	AZE	Elnur Allahverdiyev
—	DF	AZE	Igor Getman
—	DF	AZE	Aftandil Hajiyev
—	DF	AZE	Rashad Sadygov
—	DF	AZE	Mahir Shukurov
—	MF	MDA	Vadim Boreț
—	MF	AZE	Aleksandr Chertoganov

No.	Pos.	Nation	Player
—	MF	AZE	Eshgin Guliyev
—	MF	AZE	Agil Mammadov
—	MF	BUL	Svetoslav Petrov
—	MF	AZE	Elçin Rəhmanov
—	MF	AZE	Rashad Sadiqov
—	FW	GEO	Georgi Adamia
—	FW	AZE	Samir Aliyev
—	FW	AZE	Farrukh Ismayilov
—	FW	AZE	Nadir Nabiyev
—	FW	AZE	Branimir Subašić
—	FW	AZE	Zaur Tagizade

== Transfers ==
=== Summer ===
In: Note: Flags indicate national team as defined under FIFA eligibility rules; some limited exceptions apply. Players may hold more than one non-FIFA nationality.

No.	Pos.	Nation	Player
—	GK	AZE	Anar Nazirov (from (Azerbaijan) Kapaz)
—	DF	AZE	Mahir Shukurov (from (Azerbaijan) Karvan)
—	MF	AZE	Agil Mammadov (from (Azerbaijan) Baku)
—	FW	AZE	Farrukh Ismayilov (from (Azerbaijan) Karvan)

Out: Note: Flags indicate national team as defined under FIFA eligibility rules; some limited exceptions apply. Players may hold more than one non-FIFA nationality.

No.	Pos.	Nation	Player
—	GK	AZE	Asadulla Aliev
—	GK	AZE	Konstantin Gusev (to (Russia) FC Kemerovo)
—	DF	GEO	Valeri Abramidze (to (Azerbaijan) Khazar Lankaran)
—	DF	AZE	Elvin Aliyev (to (Azerbaijan) Olimpik Baku)
—	DF	AZE	Ruslan Gafitullin (to (Azerbaijan) MKT Araz)
—	MF	CRO	Darko Čordaš (to (China) Chongqing Lifan)
—	MF	AZE	Bakhtiyar Musayev
—	MF	AZE	Orhan Babaev
—	FW	SLO	Tomislav Mišura (to (Bulgaria) Lokomotiv Sofia)

=== Winter ===
In: Note: Flags indicate national team as defined under FIFA eligibility rules; some limited exceptions apply. Players may hold more than one non-FIFA nationality.

No.	Pos.	Nation	Player
—	GK	AZE	Huseyn Mahammadov (from (Azerbaijan) Karvan)
—	FW	AZE	Samir Aliyev (from (Azerbaijan) Inter Baku)

Out: Note: Flags indicate national team as defined under FIFA eligibility rules; some limited exceptions apply. Players may hold more than one non-FIFA nationality.

No.	Pos.	Nation	Player
—	GK	AZE	Anar Nazirov (loan to (Azerbaijan) Turan Tovuz)

== Competitions ==
=== Azerbaijan Premier League ===
==== Results ====
6 August 2006 1	Neftchi Baku	6 – 1	Gänclärbirliyi Sumqayit	Baku
	Adamia 17', 40'; Ismayilov 20', 25'; Nabiyev 73'; Boreț 88'	[ Summary]	H.Bagirov 86'	Stadium: Tofik Bakhramov Stadium

11 August 2006 2	Khazar Lankaran	2 – 1	Neftchi Baku	Lankaran
	Ramazanov 38' (pen.), 44'	[ Summary]	Petrov 51'	Stadium: Lankaran City Stadium

20 August 2006 3	Neftchi Baku	0 – 1	Inter Baku	Baku
		[ Summary]	Shukurov 52' (o.g.)	Stadium: Tofik Bakhramov Stadium

25 August 2006 4	MKT Araz	1 – 1	Neftchi Baku	Imishli
	Doroș 13'	[ Summary]	Nabiyev 40'	Stadium: Heydar Aliyev Stadium

18 September 2006 5	Neftchi Baku	0 – 0	Qarabağ	Baku
		[ Summary]		Stadium: Tofiq Bahramov Stadium

24 September 2006 6	Shahdag	1 – 1	Neftchi Baku	Qusar
	I.Israfilov 16'	[ Summary]	Ismayilov 12'	Stadium: Shovkat Ordukhanov Stadium

29 September 2006 7	Neftchi Baku	4 – 1	Gabala	Baku
	Tagizade 9'; Abbasov 12'; Adamia 72'; Boreț 83'	[ Summary]	Azizov 86'	Stadium: Tofik Bakhramov Stadium; Attendance: 2,000

28 October 2006 8	Neftchi Baku	3 – 1	Karvan	Baku
	Nabiyev 33'; Adamia 40', 72'	[ Summary]	Camara 7'	Stadium: Tofik Bakhramov Stadium; Attendance: 8,000

3 November 2006 9	Neftchi Baku	1 – 0	Simurq	Baku
	Adamia 47'	[ Summary]		Stadium: Tofik Bakhramov Stadium; Attendance: 2,000

10 November 2006 10	Baku	0 – 1	Neftchi Baku	Baku
		[ Summary]	A.Mammadov 5'	Stadium: Tofik Bakhramov Stadium; Attendance: 7,000

27 November 2006 11	Neftchi Baku	3 – 0	Olimpik Baku	Baku
	Ismayilov 27'; Näbiyev 44'; Adamia 72'	[ Summary]		Stadium: Tofik Bakhramov Stadium

8 December 2006 12	Turan Tovuz	2 – 1	Neftchi Baku	Tovuz
	Huseynov 60'; A.Qädiri 89'	[ Summary]	Ismayilov 45'	Stadium: Tovuz City Stadium

11 February 2007 13	Gänclärbirliyi Sumqayit	0 – 1	Neftchi Baku	Sumqayit
		[ Summary]	R.Abbasov 85'	Stadium: Mehdi Huseynzade Stadium; Attendance: 3,000

16 February 2007 14	Neftchi Baku	1 – 0	Khazar Lankaran	Baku
	Boreț 86'	[ Summary]		Stadium: Tofiq Bahramov Stadium; Attendance: 25,000

22 February 2007 15	Inter Baku	0 – 1	Neftchi Baku	Baku
		[ Summary]	Adamia 73'	Stadium: Shafa Stadium; Attendance: 2,000

18 March 2007 16	Neftchi Baku	3 – 0	MKT Araz	Baku
	Subašić 23', 90'; Adamia 80'	[ Summary]		Stadium: Tofiq Bahramov Stadium; Attendance: 3,000

2 April 2007 17	Gabala	1 – 4	Neftchi Baku	Qabala
	Mammadov 90+1'	[ Summary]	Sadygov 50' (pen.); Subašić 56'; Adamia 65'; Näbiyev 90+2'	Stadium: Gabala City Stadium; Attendance: 300

18 April 2007 18	Karvan	0 – 1	Neftchi Baku	Yevlakh
		[ Summary]	Subašić 57'	Stadium: Yevlakh City Stadium; Attendance: 500

27 April 2007 19	Qarabağ	0 – 2	Neftchi Baku	Baku
		[ Summary]	Nabiyev 11'; Aliyev 45'	Stadium: Tofik Bakhramov Stadium^{2} Attendance: 2,500

3 May 2007 20	Simurq	0 – 1	Neftchi Baku	Zaqatala
		[ Summary]	Tagizade 67'	Stadium: Zaqatala City Stadium

8 May 2007 21	Neftchi Baku	1 – 0	Baku	Baku
	Aliyev 76'	[ Summary]		Stadium: Tofik Bakhramov Stadium; Attendance: 5,500

12 May 2007 22	Neftchi Baku	5 – 0	Shahdag	Baku
	Nabiyev 8', 71'; Subašić 43', 64'; Aliyev 73'	[ Summary]		Stadium: Tofik Bakhramov Stadium; Attendance: 1,000

17 May 2007 23	Olimpik Baku	2 – 1	Neftchi Baku	Baku
	Bangoura 63'; Mammadov 66'	[ Summary]	Sadygov 11' (pen.)	Stadium: Shafa Stadium; Attendance: 3,000

26 May 2007 24	Neftchi Baku	4 – 2	Turan Tovuz	Baku
	Nabiyev 29'; Boreț 56'; R.Abbasov 66'; Aliyev 70'	[ Summary]	Aliyev 11'; Igbekoi 73'	Stadium: Tofik Bakhramov Stadium; Attendance: 400

==== Table ====
Pos	Team	Pld	W	D	L	GF	GA	GD	Pts	Qualification or relegation
1	Khazar Lankaran (C)	24	17	5	2	50	16	+34	56	Qualification for Champions League first qualifying round
2	Neftçi Baku	24	17	3	4	47	15	+32	54	Qualification for UEFA Cup first qualifying round (Note: MKT-Araz qualified for the first qualifying round of the 2005–06 UEFA Cup as winner of the 2004–05 Azerbaijan Cup.)
3	Baku	24	14	6	4	25	10	+15	48	Qualification for Intertoto Cup first round
4	Inter Baku	24	13	6	5	36	12	+24	45	
5	FK MKT-Araz	24	12	5	7	23	18	+5	41	Qualification for UEFA Cup first qualifying round

Source: Azerbaijan Professional Football league
(C) Champions

=== Azerbaijan Cup ===
2006 First Round 1st leg	Baku 2	0 – 3	Neftchi Baku	Baku
AZST (UTC+5)		[ Summary]	Mammadov 4'; E.Rəhmanov 85'; Subašić 90+2'

2006 First Round 2nd leg	Neftchi Baku	5 – 0 (8 – 0 agg.)	Baku 2	Baku
AZST (UTC+5)		[ Summary]		Stadium: Tofiq Bahramov Stadium

21 November 2006 Last 16 1st leg	Qarabağ	1 – 2	Neftchi Baku	Baku
AZT (UTC+4)	Abbasov 64'	[ Summary]	Ismayilov 16'; Tagizade 62'	Stadium: Tofik Bakhramov Stadium^{2} Attendance: 1,000

3 December 2006 Last 16 2nd leg	Neftchi Baku	0 – 1 ((a)2 – 2 agg.)	Qarabağ	Baku
AZT (UTC+4)		[ Summary]	K.Karimov 66'	Stadium: Tofiq Bahramov Stadium; Attendance: 2,000

2007 Quarterfinals 1st leg	Neftchi Baku	7 – 2	Turan Tovuz	Baku
AZT (UTC+4)	Subašić 10'; Boreț 15'; Adamia 33'; Abishov 39'; Aliyev 50'; Nabiyev 76', 88'	[ Summary]	Igbekoi 2', 69'	Stadium: Tofiq Bahramov Stadium; Attendance: 300

2007 Quarterfinals 2nd leg	Turan Tovuz	0 – 1 (2 – 8 agg.)	Neftchi Baku	Tovuz
AZT (UTC+4)		[ Summary]	Ismayilov 80'	Stadium: Tovuz City Stadium; Attendance: 2,000

13 April 2007 Semifinal 1st leg	MKT Araz	0 – 0	Neftchi Baku	Imishli
AZST (UTC+5)		[ Summary]		Stadium: Heydar Aliyev Stadium

23 April 2007 Semifinal 2nd leg	Neftchi Baku	1 – 1 (1 – 1(a) agg.)	MKT Araz	Baku
AZST (UTC+5)	Tagizade 28'	[ Summary]	Aghakishiyev 66' (pen.)	Stadium: Tofiq Bahramov Stadium

== Squad statistics ==
=== Appearances and goals ===
No.	Pos	Nat	Player	Total		Premier League		Azerbaijan Cup	
No.	Pos	Nat	Player	Apps	Goals	Apps	Goals	Apps	Goals
	GK	(Azerbaijan) AZE	Huseyn Mahammadov	9	0	9	0	0	0
	GK	(Serbia) SRB	Vladimir Mićović	15	0	15	0	0	0
	DF	(Azerbaijan) AZE	Ruslan Abbasov	19	3	19	3	0	0
	DF	(Azerbaijan) AZE	Ruslan Abishov	7	0	7	0	0	0
	DF	(Azerbaijan) AZE	Elnur Allahverdiyev	14	0	14	0	0	0
	DF	(Azerbaijan) AZE	Igor Getman	1	0	1	0	0	0
	DF	(Azerbaijan) AZE	Aftandil Hajiyev	13	0	13	0	0	0
	DF	(Azerbaijan) AZE	Rashad Sadygov	12	2	12	2	0	0
	DF	(Azerbaijan) AZE	Mahir Shukurov	21	0	21	0	0	0
	MF	(Moldova) MDA	Vadim Boreț	21	4	21	4	0	0
	MF	(Azerbaijan) AZE	Aleksandr Chertoganov	19	0	19	0	0	0
	MF	(Azerbaijan) AZE	Eshgin Guliyev	2	0	2	0	0	0
	MF	(Azerbaijan) AZE	Agil Mammadov	23	1	23	1	0	0
	MF	(Bulgaria) BUL	Svetoslav Petrov	10	1	10	1	0	0
	MF	(Azerbaijan) AZE	Elçin Rəhmanov	4	0	4	0	0	0
	MF	(Azerbaijan) AZE	Rashad Sadiqov	24	0	24	0	0	0
	FW	(Georgia (country)) GEO	Georgi Adamia	20	10	20	10	0	0
	FW	(Azerbaijan) AZE	Samir Aliyev	12	4	12	4	0	0
	FW	(Azerbaijan) AZE	Farrukh Ismayilov	17	5	17	5	0	0
	FW	(Azerbaijan) AZE	Nadir Nabiyev	24	9	24	9	0	0
	FW	(Azerbaijan) AZE	Branimir Subašić	16	6	16	6	0	0
	FW	(Azerbaijan) AZE	Zaur Tagizade	23	2	23	2	0	0
Players away from Neftchi Baku on loan :
	GK	(Azerbaijan) AZE	Anar Nazirov	3	0	3	0	0	0
Players who appeared for Neftchi Baku who left during the season:

=== Goal scorers ===
Place	Position	Nation	Number	Name	Premier League	Azerbaijan Cup	Total
1	FW	(Georgia (country))		Georgi Adamia	10	1	11
1	FW	(Azerbaijan)		Nadir Nabiyev	9	2	11
3	FW	(Azerbaijan)		Branimir Subašić	6	2	8
4	FW	(Azerbaijan)		Farrukh Ismayilov	5	2	7
5	MF	(Moldova)		Vadim Boreț	4	1	5
5	FW	(Azerbaijan)		Samir Aliyev	4	1	5
7	MF	(Azerbaijan)		Zaur Tagizade	2	2	4
8	DF	(Azerbaijan)		Ruslan Abbasov	3	0	3
9	DF	(Azerbaijan)		Rashad Sadygov	2	0	2
9	MF	(Azerbaijan)		Agil Mammadov	1	1	1
11	FW	(Bulgaria)		Svetoslav Petrov	1	0	1
11	FW	(Azerbaijan)		Ruslan Abishov	0	1	1
11	FW	(Azerbaijan)		Elçin Rəhmanov	0	1	1
				Unknown	0	5	0
				TOTALS	47	19	66

== Notes ==
- Qarabağ have played their home games at the Tofiq Bahramov Stadium since 1993 due to the ongoing situation in Quzanlı.
- Neftchi Baku awarded the win.
