= Azerbaijan national football team results (2000–2009) =

This article details the fixtures and results of the Azerbaijan national football team in 2000s.

== 2000–2009 ==
Type	GP	W	D	L	GF	GA
Friendly Matches	47	8	19	20	36	62
Alma TV Cup	3	2	0	1	2	1
Rothmans Football International Tournament	3	0	1	2	0	4
2002 FIFA World Cup qualification	10	1	2	7	4	17
UEFA Euro 2004 qualifying	8	1	1	6	5	20
2006 FIFA World Cup qualification	10	0	3	7	1	21
UEFA Euro 2008 qualifying	12	1	2	9	6	28
2010 FIFA World Cup qualification	10	1	2	7	4	14
Total	103	14	30	59	58	167

=== 2000 ===
6 February 2000 Rothmans Tournament	Malta	3 – 0	Azerbaijan	Ta' Qali, Malta
	Buttigieg 31'; Agius 55', 90' (pen.)	Report		Stadium: National Stadium; Attendance: 2,603; Referee: Bujar Pregja (Albania)

8 February 2000 Rothmans Tournament	Albania	1 – 0	Azerbaijan	Ta' Qali, Malta
	Murati 37'	Report		Stadium: National Stadium; Attendance: 4,500; Referee: Emmanuel Raphael Zammit (Malta)

10 February 2000 Rothmans Tournament	Azerbaijan	0 – 0	Andorra	Ta' Qali, Malta
		Report		Stadium: National Stadium; Attendance: 4,000; Referee: Lawrie Zammut (Malta)

4 June 2000 Friendly	Azerbaijan	0 – 0	Georgia	Baku, Azerbaijan
		Report		Stadium: Tofiq Bahramov Stadium; Attendance: 7,000; Referee: Khagani Mamedov (Azerbaijan)

27 July 2000 San Pelegrino Tourn.	Azerbaijan	1 – 2	Macedonia	Varna, Bulgaria
	R. Mamedov 53'	(Report)	62', 68' Nuhiji	Stadium: Ticha Stadium; Attendance: 2,000; Referee: Mitko Mitrev (Bulgaria)

2 September 2000 2002 WCQ	Azerbaijan	0 – 1	Sweden	Baku, Azerbaijan
20:45 AZST (UTC+5)		Report	10' A. Svensson	Stadium: Tofiq Bahramov Stadium; Attendance: 20,000; Referee: Roelof Luinge (Netherlands)

7 October 2000 2002 WCQ	Macedonia	3 – 0	Azerbaijan	Skopje, Macedonia
22:00 AZST (UTC+5)	Hristov 35', 42'; Beqiri 75'	Report		Stadium: Skopje City Stadium; Attendance: 3,500; Referee: Knud Erik Fisker (Denmark)

11 October 2000 2002 WCQ	Azerbaijan	0 – 1	Turkey	Baku, Azerbaijan
20:00 AZST (UTC+5)		Report	73' Şükür	Stadium: Tofiq Bahramov Stadium; Attendance: 24,000; Referee: Alan Snoddy (Northern Ireland)

=== 2001 ===
15 February 2001 Friendly	Uzbekistan	2 – 1	Azerbaijan	Varna, Bulgaria
	Isoqov 44', 73'	Report	52' (pen.) Rzayev	Stadium: Spartak Stadium; Attendance: 1,000; Referee: ? (Bulgaria)

25 February 2001 Friendly	Belarus	0 – 1	Azerbaijan	Varna, Bulgaria
		Report	9' Tagizade	Stadium: Spartak Stadium; Referee: Anton Genov (Bulgaria)

24 March 2001 2002 WCQ	Azerbaijan	0 – 0	Moldova	Baku, Azerbaijan
16:00 AZT (UTC+4)	Ismayilov (yellow card) 67' (yellow-red card) 78'	Report	Hmaruc (red card) 14'; Epureanu (yellow card) 53' (yellow-red card) 70'	Stadium: Tofiq Bahramov Stadium; Attendance: 20,000; Referee: Wolfgang Stark (Germany)

28 March 2001 2002 WCQ	Slovakia	3 – 1	Azerbaijan	Trnava, Slovakia
20:00 AZT (UTC+4)	Németh 1', 10'; Meszároš 57'	Report	Vasilyev 3'; Agaev (yellow card) 53' (yellow-red card) 78'	Stadium: Štadión Antona Malatinského; Attendance: 7,997; Referee: Costas Kapitanis (Cyprus)

8 May 2001 Friendly	Georgia	1 – 0	Azerbaijan	Kutaisi, Georgia
	Ionanidze 62'	Report		Stadium: Givi Kiladze Stadium; Attendance: 2,000; Referee: Merab Malaghuradze (Georgia)

1 June 2001 2002 WCQ	Turkey	3 – 0	Azerbaijan	Istanbul, Turkey
22:30 AZST (UTC+5)	Korkut 1', 34'; Derelioğlu 29'	Report		Stadium: BJK İnönü Stadium; Attendance: 17,386; Referee: Juan Ansuátegui Roca (Spain)

5 June 2001 2002 WCQ	Azerbaijan	2 – 0	Slovakia	Baku, Azerbaijan
19:00 AZST (UTC+5)	Vasilyev 27'; Tagizade 65'	Report		Stadium: Tofiq Bahramov Stadium; Attendance: 15,000; Referee: Nicolai Vollquartz (Denmark)

31 August 2001 2002 WCQ	Moldova	2 – 0	Azerbaijan	Chişinău, Moldova
19:30 AZST (UTC+5)	Cleşcenco 19'; Covalenco 88'	Report		Stadium: Stadionul Republican; Attendance: 4,800; Referee: Vasiliy Melnichuk (Ukraine)

4 September 2001 2002 WCQ	Azerbaijan	1 – 1	Macedonia	Baku, Azerbaijan
19:00 AZST (UTC+5)	Ismayilov 90'	Report	Trajanov 12'	Stadium: Tofiq Bahramov Stadium; Attendance: 4,100; Referee: Michael Ross (Northern Ireland)

6 October 2001 2002 WCQ	Sweden	3 – 0	Azerbaijan	Stockholm, Sweden
19:00 AZST (UTC+5)	Svensson 52'; Larsson 60' (pen.); Ibrahimović 69'	Report		Stadium: Råsunda Stadium; Attendance: 32,786; Referee: Ryszard Wojcik (Poland)

=== 2002 ===
26 March 2002 Friendly	Albania	1 – 0	Azerbaijan	Tirana, Albania
	Tare 39'	(Report)		Stadium: Qemal Stafa Stadium; Attendance: 10,000; Referee: Emil Božinovski (Macedonia)

16 April 2002 Friendly	Malta	1 – 0	Azerbaijan	Ta' Qali, Malta
	Mifsud 56'	(Report)		Stadium: National Stadium; Attendance: 413; Referee: Roberto Rosetti (Italy)

2 July 2002 Friendly	Estonia	0 – 0	Azerbaijan	Kuressaare, Estonia
		(Report)		Stadium: Kuressaare linnastaadion Attendance: 2,200; Referee: Nicolai Vollquartz (Denmark)

5 July 2002 Friendly	Latvia	0 – 0	Azerbaijan	Riga, Latvia
		(Report)		Stadium: Skonto Stadium; Attendance: 2,000; Referee: Darius Mieželis (Lithuania)

10 August 2002 Friendly	Iran	1 – 1	Azerbaijan	Tabriz, Iran
	Karimi 33'	(Report)	16' Ismayilov	Stadium: Takhti Stadium, Attendance: 10,000; Referee: Rahim Rahimi Moqadam (Iran)

21 August 2002 Friendly	Azerbaijan	2 – 0	Uzbekistan	Baku, Azerbaijan
	Aliyev 40'; Ismayilov 80'	(Report)		Stadium: Shafa Stadium; Attendance: 7,000; Referee: Munis Abdullayev (Azerbaijan)

7 September 2002 Euro 2004 Q	Azerbaijan	0 – 2	Italy	Baku, Azerbaijan
		(Report)	32' (o.g.) Ahmadov; 63' Del Piero	Stadium: Tofiq Bahramov Stadium; Attendance: 37,000; Referee: Kyros Vassaras (Germany)

12 October 2002 Euro 2004 Q	Finland	3 – 0	Azerbaijan	Helsinki, Finland
	Agaev 14' (o.g.); Tihinen 60'; Hyypiä 72'	(Report)		Stadium: Helsinki Olympic Stadium; Attendance: 11,853; Referee: Alain Hamer (Luxembourg)

20 November 2002 Euro 2004 Q	Azerbaijan	0 – 2	Wales	Baku, Azerbaijan
		(Report)	10' Speed; 68' Hartson	Stadium: Tofiq Bahramov Stadium; Attendance: 12,000; Referee: Luc Huyghe (Belgium)

=== 2003 ===
12 February 2003 Euro 2004 Q	Serbia and Montenegro	2 – 2	Azerbaijan	Podgorica, Serbia and Montenegro
	Mijatović 33' (pen.); Lazetić 52'	(Report)	58', 78' Gurbanov	Stadium: Podgorica City Stadium; Attendance: 8,000; Referee: Jacek Granat (Poland)

29 March 2003 Euro 2004 Q	Wales	4 – 0	Azerbaijan	Cardiff, Wales
	Davies 1'; Speed 40'; Hartson 43'; Giggs 52'	(Report)		Stadium: Millennium Stadium; Attendance: 73,500; Referee: Philippe Leuba (Switzerland)

11 June 2003 Euro 2004 Q	Azerbaijan	2 – 1	Serbia and Montenegro	Baku, Azerbaijan
	Gurbanov 88' (pen.); Ismayilov 90+1'	(Report)	27' Bošković	Stadium: Shafa Stadium; Attendance: 3,500; Referee: Knud Erik Fisker (Denmark)

6 September 2003 Euro 2004 Q	Azerbaijan	1 – 2	Finland	Baku, Azerbaijan
	Ismayilov 88'	(Report)	52' Tainio; 74' Nurmela	Stadium: Shafa Stadium; Attendance: 7,500; Referee: Vladimír Hriňák (Slovakia)

11 October 2003 Euro 2004 Q	Italy	4 – 0	Azerbaijan	Reggio Calabria, Italy
	Vieri 15'; Inzaghi 24', 87'; Di Vaio 64'	(Report)		Stadium: Stadio Oreste Granillo; Attendance: 27,000; Referee: Stuart Dougal (Scotland)

14 December 2003 Friendly	United Arab Emirates	3 – 3	Azerbaijan	Dubai, United Arab Emirates
	Mubarak 5'; Srour 54'; Omar 72' (pen.)	(Report)	26', 90+1' Nabiev; 83' Kerimov	Stadium: Al-Maktoum Stadium; Referee: Salah Amin (UAE)

17 December 2003 Friendly	Oman	1 – 0	Azerbaijan	Muscat, Oman
	Saleh 80'	(Report)		Stadium: Sultan Qaboos Sports Complex

20 December 2003 Friendly	Saudi Arabia	1 – 0	Azerbaijan	Dammam, Saudi Arabia
	Al-Meshal 86'	(Report)		Stadium: Mohamed bin Fahd Stadium

=== 2004 ===
18 February 2004 Friendly	Israel	6 – 0	Azerbaijan	Ramat Gan, Israel
	Arbeitman 9', 66', 69'; Tal 25' (pen.); Katan 45+2', 61'	(Report)		Stadium: Ramat Gan Stadium; Attendance: 12,250; Referee: Paulo Paraty (Portugal)

31 March 2004 Friendly	Moldova	2 – 1	Azerbaijan	Baku, Azerbaijan
	Dadu 42' (pen.), 84'	(Report)	20' Gurbanov	Stadium: Tofiq Bahramov Stadium; Attendance: 5,500; Referee: Vitaliy Godulyan (Ukraine)

28 April 2004 Friendly	Kazakhstan	2 – 3	Azerbaijan	Almaty, Kazakhstan
21:30	Karpovich 56'; Lunyov 80'	(Report)	33' Nabiev; 60' Quliyev; 85' R.F. Sadygov	Stadium: Central Stadium; Attendance: 18,000; Referee: Kadyrbek Chynybekov (Kyrgyzstan)

28 May 2004 Friendly	Azerbaijan	3 – 1	Uzbekistan	Baku, Azerbaijan
	Gurbanov 31'; I. Gurbanov 63'; Quliyev 74'	(Report)	45' Tadjiyev	Stadium: Tofiq Bahramov Stadium; Attendance: 12,000; Referee: Merab Malaghuradze (Georgia)

6 June 2004 Friendly	Latvia	2 – 2	Azerbaijan	Riga, Latvia
	Verpakovskis 54'; Zemļinskis 82' (pen.)	(Report)	56' Quliyev; 75' Gurbanov	Stadium: Skonto Stadium; Attendance: 6,000; Referee: Jari Maisonlahti (Finland)

18 August 2004 Friendly	Jordan	1 – 1	Azerbaijan	Amman, Jordan
	Aqel 21'	(Report)	23' Ponomarev	Stadium: International Stadium; Attendance: 10,000

4 September 2004 2006 WCQ	Azerbaijan	1 – 1	Wales	Baku, Azerbaijan
21:00	R.F. Sadygov 55'	(Report)	47' Speed	Stadium: Tofiq Bahramov Stadium; Attendance: 8,000; Referee: Edo Trivković (Croatia)

8 September 2004 2006 WCQ	Austria	2 – 0	Azerbaijan	Vienna, Austria
20:30	Stranzl 23'; Kollmann 44'	(Report)		Stadium: Ernst-Happel-Stadion; Attendance: 26,400; Referee: Lawrence Sammut (Malta)

9 October 2004 2006 WCQ	Azerbaijan	0 – 0	Northern Ireland	Baku, Azerbaijan
21:30		(Report)		Stadium: Tofiq Bahramov Stadium; Attendance: 6,460; Referee: Attila Hanacsek (Hungary)

13 October 2004 2006 WCQ	Azerbaijan	0 – 1	England	Baku, Azerbaijan
21:30		(Report)	Owen 22'	Stadium: Tofiq Bahramov Stadium; Attendance: 17,000; Referee: Alain Hamer (Luxembourg)

17 November 2004 Friendly	Azerbaijan	0 – 0	Bulgaria	Baku, Azerbaijan
21:30		(Report)		Stadium: Tofiq Bahramov Stadium; Attendance: 3,000; Referee: Andrejs Sipailo (Latvia)

=== 2005 ===
21 January 2005 Friendly	Trinidad and Tobago	1 – 0	Azerbaijan	Port of Spain, Trinidad and Tobago
	Sealy 41'	(Report)		Stadium: Hasely Crawford Stadium; Attendance: 500; Referee: (Trinidad and Tobago) Ramesh Ramdhan

23 January 2005 Friendly	Trinidad and Tobago	2 – 0	Azerbaijan	Marabella, Trinidad and Tobago
	Pierre 21'; Smith 67'	(Report)		Stadium: Manny Ramjohn Stadium; Attendance: 1,000; Referee: (Trinidad and Tobago) Ted Gordon

9 February 2005 Friendly	Azerbaijan	0 – 0	Moldova	Baku, Azerbaijan
		(Report)		Stadium: Tofiq Bahramov Stadium; Attendance: 1,500; Referee: (Georgia (country)) Levan Paniashvili

26 March 2005 2006 WCQ	Poland	8 – 0	Azerbaijan	Warsaw, Poland
	Frankowski 12', 63', 66'; Hajiyev 16' (o.g.); Kosowski 40'; Krzynówek 72'; Saganowski 84', 90'	(Report)		Stadium: Polish Army Stadium; Attendance: 8,112; Referee: (Denmark) Nicolai Vollquartz

30 March 2005 2006 WCQ	England	2 – 0	Azerbaijan	Newcastle upon Tyne, England
	Gerrard 51'; Beckham 62'	(Report)		Stadium: St James' Park; Attendance: 49,046; Referee: (Portugal) Paulo Costa

29 May 2005 Friendly	Iran	2 – 1	Azerbaijan	Tehran, Iran
	Zandi 9'; Nekounam 30'	(Report)	68' A. Qurbanov	Stadium: Azadi Stadium; Attendance: 25,000; Referee: (Kuwait) Saad Kamil

4 June 2005 2006 WCQ	Azerbaijan	0 – 3	Poland	Baku, Azerbaijan
		(Report)	28' Frankowski; 57' Kłos; 81' Żurawski	Stadium: Tofiq Bahramov Stadium; Attendance: 10,458; Referee: (Spain) Alberto Undiano Mallenco

17 August 2005 Friendly	Albania	2 – 1	Azerbaijan	Tirana, Albania
	Bushi 37'; Cana 72'	(Report)	3' Tagizade	Stadium: Qemal Stafa Stadium; Attendance: 7,300; Referee: (Turkey) Mustafa Çulcu

3 September 2005 2006 WCQ	Northern Ireland	2 – 0	Azerbaijan	Belfast, Northern Ireland
	Elliott 60'; Feeney 84'	(Report)		Stadium: Windsor Park; Attendance: 12,000; Referee: (Montenegro) Dejan Stanišić

7 September 2005 2006 WCQ	Azerbaijan	0 – 0	Austria	Baku, Azerbaijan
		(Report)		Stadium: Tofiq Bahramov Stadium; Attendance: 2,800; Referee: (Belgium) Johan Verbist

12 October 2005 2006 WCQ	Wales	2 – 0	Azerbaijan	Cardiff, Wales
	Giggs 3', 51'	(Report)		Stadium: Millennium Stadium; Attendance: 32,628; Referee: (Sweden) Martin Hansson

=== 2006 ===
28 February 2006 Friendly	Azerbaijan	0 – 0	Ukraine	Baku, Azerbaijan
		(Report)		Stadium: Tofiq Bahramov Stadium; Attendance: 8,000; Referee: Andrejs Sipailo (Latvia)

12 April 2006 Friendly	Azerbaijan	1 – 1	Turkey	Baku, Azerbaijan
	R.F. Sadygov 65' (pen.)	(Report)	78' Kabze	Stadium: Tofiq Bahramov Stadium; Attendance: 26,000; Referee: Levan Paniashvili (Georgia)

18 May 2006 Friendly	Moldova	0 – 0	Azerbaijan	Chişinău, Moldova
		(Report)		Stadium: Stadionul Republican; Attendance: 3,500; Referee: Yuri Baskakov (Russia)

15 August 2006 Friendly	Ukraine	6 – 0	Azerbaijan	Kyiv, Ukraine
	Voronin 3'; Nazarenko 12'; Rotan 25'; Husyev 45'; Vorobey 71'; Byelik 90+1'	(Report)		Stadium: Valeri Lobanovsky Stadium; Attendance: 6,500; Referee: Stanislav Sukhina (Russia)

2 September 2006 EURO 2008 Q	Serbia	1 – 0	Azerbaijan	Belgrade, Serbia
20:15 CEST	Žigić 72'	(Report)		Stadium: Stadion Crvena Zvezda; Attendance: 0 Referee: Knut Kircher (Germany)

6 September 2006 EURO 2008 Q	Azerbaijan	1 – 1	Kazakhstan	Baku, Azerbaijan
19:00 UTC+5	Ladaga 16'	(Report)	Byakov 36'	Stadium: Tofiq Bahramov Stadium; Attendance: 18,000; Referee: Zsolt Szabo (Hungary)

7 October 2006 EURO 2008 Q	Portugal	3 – 0	Azerbaijan	Porto, Portugal
21:00 WEST	Ronaldo 25', 63'; Carvalho 31'	(Report)		Stadium: Bessa XXI; Attendance: 18,000; Referee: Mark Halsey (England)

11 October 2006 EURO 2008 Q	Belgium	3 – 0	Azerbaijan	Brussels, Belgium
20:45 CEST	Simons 24' (pen.); Vandenbergh 47'; Dembélé 82'	(Report)		Stadium: Constant Vanden Stock; Attendance: 12,000; Referee: Romans Lajuks (Latvia)

=== 2007 ===
7 February 2007 Friendly	Uzbekistan	0 – 0	Azerbaijan	Qarshi, Uzbekistan
		(Report)		Stadium: Markaziy Stadium; Attendance: 10,000; Referee: (Uzbekistan) Ravshan Irmatov

7 March 2007 Alma TV Cup	Uzbekistan	0 – 1	Azerbaijan	Shymkent Kazakhstan
		(Report)	56' Subašić	Stadium: Kazhimukan Munaitpasov; Attendance: 1,500; Referee: (Kazakhstan) Akmal Holmatov

9 March 2007 Alma TV Cup	Kazakhstan	1 – 0	Azerbaijan	Shymkent Kazakhstan
	Finonchenko 81'	(Report)		Stadium: Kazhimukan Munaitpasov; Attendance: 4,500; Referee: (Kyrgyzstan) Dmitriy Mashentsev

11 March 2007 Alma TV Cup	Azerbaijan	1 – 0	Kyrgyzstan	Shymkent Kazakhstan
	Javadov 18'	(Report)		Stadium: Kazhimukan Munaitpasov; Referee: (Azerbaijan) Vusal Aliyev

24 March 2007 EURO 2008 Q	Poland	5 – 0	Azerbaijan	Warsaw, Poland
18:00 CET	Bąk 3'; Dudka 6'; Łobodziński 34'; Krzynówek 58'; Kaźmierczak 84'	Report		Stadium: Stadion Wojska Polskiego; Attendance: 12,000; Referee: (Iceland) Kristinn Jakobsson

28 March 2007 EURO 2008 Q	Azerbaijan	1 – 0	Finland	Baku, Azerbaijan
20:00 UTC+5	Imamaliev 83'	(Report)		Stadium: Tofiq Bahramov Stadium; Attendance: 14,000; Referee: (Italy) Domenico Messina

2 June 2007 EURO 2008 Q	Azerbaijan	1 – 3	Poland	Baku, Azerbaijan
21:00 UTC+5	Subašić 6'	(Report)	63' Smolarek; 66', 90' Krzynówek	Stadium: Tofiq Bahramov Stadium; Attendance: 4,500; Referee: (Cyprus) Costas Kapitanis

6 June 2007 EURO 2008 Q	Kazakhstan	1 – 1	Azerbaijan	Almaty Kazakhstan
19:00 UTC+6	Baltiev 53'	(Report)	Nadirov 30'	Stadium: Almaty Central Stadium; Attendance: 11,800; Referee: (Luxembourg) Albert Toussaint

22 August 2007 Friendly	Tajikistan	2 – 3	Azerbaijan	Dushanbe, Tajikistan
	Barotov 18'; Saidov 31'	(Report)	Aliyev 25', 29'; Subašić 43'	Stadium: Pamir Stadium; Referee: Orif Djuraev (Tajikistan)

12 September 2007 Friendly	Azerbaijan	1 – 1	Georgia	Baku, Azerbaijan
	Subašić 45'	(Report)	48' Tatanashvilli	Stadium: Tofiq Bahramov Stadium; Attendance: 10,000; Referee: (Uzbekistan) Valentin Kovalenko

13 October 2007 EURO 2008 Q	Azerbaijan	0 – 2	Portugal	Baku, Azerbaijan
21:00 UTC+5		(Report)	12' Bruno Alves; 45' Almeida	Stadium: Tofiq Bahramov Stadium; Attendance: 29,300; Referee: (Croatia) Ivan Bebek

17 October 2007 EURO 2008 Q	Azerbaijan	1 – 6	Serbia	Baku, Azerbaijan
21:00 UTC+5	Aliyev 26'	(Report)	4' D. Tošić; 22', 42' Žigić; 41' Janković; 75' Smiljanic; 84' Lazović	Stadium: Tofiq Bahramov Stadium; Attendance: 9,000; Referee: (Austria) Thomas Einwaller

17 November 2007 EURO 2008 Q	Finland	2 – 1	Azerbaijan	Helsinki, Finland
16:05 EET	Forssell 79'; Kuqi 86'	(Report)	63' M.Gurbanov	Stadium: Helsinki Olympic Stadium; Attendance: 10,325; Referee: (Luxembourg) Alain Hamer

21 November 2007 EURO 2008 Q	Azerbaijan	0 – 1	Belgium	Baku, Azerbaijan
21:00 UTC+4		(Report)	52' Pieroni	Stadium: Tofiq Bahramov Stadium; Attendance: 17,000; Referee: (Israel) Asaf Kenan

=== 2008 ===
3 February 2008 Friendly	Azerbaijan	0 – 0	Kazakhstan	Antalya, Turkey
		(Report)		Stadium: World of Wonders Football Centre; Attendance: 1,500; Referee: Mustafa Kâmil Abitoğlu (Turkey)

26 March 2008 Friendly	Lithuania	1 – 0	Azerbaijan	Vilnius, Lithuania
	Klimavičius 37'	(Report)		Stadium: Vėtra Stadium; Attendance: 1,000; Referee: Igor Satchi (Moldova)

1 June 2008 Friendly	Bosnia and Herzegovina	1 – 0	Azerbaijan	Zenica, Bosnia and Herzegovina
	Nikolić 73'	(Report)		Stadium: Bilino Polje; Attendance: 800; Referee: Pavle Radovanović (Montenegro)

4 June 2008 Friendly	Andorra	1 – 2	Azerbaijan	Andorra la Vella, Andorra
	I. Lima 52'	(Report)	17' Ramim; 43' Subašić	Stadium: Estadi Comunal; Attendance: 1,000; Referee: Duarte Gomes (Portugal)

20 August 2008 Friendly	Iceland	1 – 1	Azerbaijan	Reykjavík, Iceland
21:45 CEST	Steinsson 56'	(Report)	48' Ramim	Stadium: Laugardalsvöllur; Attendance: 5,133; Referee: Simon Lee Evans (Wales)

27 August 2008 Friendly	Iran	1 – 0	Azerbaijan	Tehran, Iran
16:30 CEST	Nouri 82'	(Report)		Stadium: Azadi Stadium; Attendance: 10,000; Referee: Hedayat Mombeni (Iran)

6 September 2008 2010 WCQ	Wales	1 – 0	Azerbaijan	Cardiff, Wales
15:00 UTC+1	Vokes 83'	(Report)		Stadium: Millennium Stadium; Attendance: 17,106; Referee: Aleksandar Stavrev (Macedonia)

10 September 2008 2010 WCQ	Azerbaijan	0 – 0	Liechtenstein	Baku, Azerbaijan
21:00 UTC+5		(Report)		Stadium: Tofiq Bahramov Stadium; Attendance: 25,000; Referee: Tsvetan Georgiev (Bulgaria)

11 October 2008 2010 WCQ	Finland	1 – 0	Azerbaijan	Helsinki, Finland
17:00 UTC+3	Forssell 61' (pen.)	(Report)		Stadium: Helsinki Olympic Stadium; Attendance: 22,124; Referee: William Collum (Scotland)

15 October 2008 Friendly	Bahrain	1 – 2	Azerbaijan	Arad, Bahrain
	Rashid 33'	(Report)	45+2' Məmmədov; 65' Zeynalov	Stadium: Al Muharraq Stadium; Referee: Mahmoud Al-Mirdas (Saudi Arabia)

19 November 2008 Friendly	Azerbaijan	1 – 1	Albania	Baku, Azerbaijan
	Subašić 4'	(Report)	12' Skela	Stadium: Tofiq Bahramov Stadium; Attendance: 10,000; Referee: Lasha Silagava (Georgia)

=== 2009 ===
1 February 2009 Friendly	Azerbaijan	1 – 1	Uzbekistan	Dubai, UAE
	Ramim 63' (pen.)	(Report)	Qurbanov 80'	Stadium: Al-Maktoum Stadium; Attendance: 100; Referee: Ali Hamad Al-Badwawi (UAE)

11 February 2009 Friendly	Kuwait	1 – 1	Azerbaijan	Kuwait City, Kuwait
21:00 AZST (UTC+5)	Al Amer 70'	(Report)	Javadov 1'	Stadium: Kuwait National Stadium; Attendance: 300; Referee: Mahmoud Al-Mirdas (Saudi Arabia)

28 March 2009 2010 WCQ	Russia	2 – 0	Azerbaijan	Moscow, Russia
18:00 AZT (UTC+4)	Pavlyuchenko 32'; Zyryanov 71'	(Report)		Stadium: Luzhniki Stadium; Attendance: 62,000; Referee: Serge Gumienny (Belgium)

2 June 2009 Friendly	Turkey	2 – 0	Azerbaijan	Kayseri, Turkey
22:00 AZST (UTC+5)	Halil A. 70'; Üzülmez 75'	(Report)		Stadium: Kadir Has Stadium; Attendance: 32,864; Referee: Mario Vlk (Slovakia)

6 June 2009 2010 WCQ	Azerbaijan	0 – 1	Wales	Baku, Azerbaijan
20:00 AZST (UTC+5)		(Report)	42' Edwards	Stadium: Tofiq Bahramov Stadium; Attendance: 26,728; Referee: Markus Strombergsson (Sweden)

9 June 2009 Friendly	Azerbaijan	0 – 6	Spain	Baku, Azerbaijan
21:00 AZST (UTC+5)		(Report)	34', 38', 45' (pen.) Villa; 67' Riera; 70' Güiza; 87' Torres	Stadium: Tofiq Bahramov Stadium; Attendance: 29,000; Referee: Igor Ishchenko (Ukraine)

12 August 2009 2010 WCQ	Azerbaijan	0 – 2	Germany	Baku, Azerbaijan
21:00 AZST (UTC+5)		(Report)	11' Schweinsteiger; 53' Klose	Stadium: Tofiq Bahramov Stadium; Attendance: 22,500; Referee: Alan Kelly (Ireland)

5 September 2009 2010 WCQ	Azerbaijan	1 – 2	Finland	Lankaran, Azerbaijan
23:00 AZST (UTC+5)	Məmmədov 49'	(Report)	74' Tihinen; 85' Johansson	Stadium: Lankaran City Stadium; Attendance: 12,000; Referee: Stelios Trifonos (Cyprus)

9 September 2009 2010 WCQ	Germany	4 – 0	Azerbaijan	Hannover, Germany
23:45 AZST (UTC+5)	Ballack 14' (pen.); Klose 55', 65'; Podolski 71'	(Report)		Stadium: AWD-Arena; Attendance: 35,369; Referee: Anastasios Kakos (Greece)

10 October 2009 2010 WCQ	Liechtenstein	0 – 2	Azerbaijan	Vaduz, Liechtenstein
23:00 AZST (UTC+5)		(Report)	Javadov 55'; Məmmədov 82'	Stadium: Rheinpark Stadion; Attendance: 1,635; Referee: Pavle Radovanović (Montenegro)

14 October 2009 2010 WCQ	Azerbaijan	1 – 1	Russia	Baku, Azerbaijan
21:00 AZST (UTC+5)	Javadov 53'	(Report)	Arshavin 13'	Stadium: Tofiq Bahramov Stadium; Attendance: 17,000; Referee: Howard Webb (England)

15 November 2009 UAE Int. Cup	Iraq	1 – 0	Azerbaijan	Al Ain, UAE
16:45 AZT (UTC+4)	Abbas 88'	(Report)		Stadium: Tahnoun bin Mohammed Stadium; Referee: Mohamed Ali Al Junaibi (UAE)

18 November 2009 UAE Int. Cup	Czech Republic	0 – 2	Azerbaijan	Al Ain, UAE
		(Report)	Javadov 25'; Abushev 89'	Stadium: Tahnoun bin Mohammed Stadium; Attendance: 500; Referee: Farid Ali Al Marzouqi (UAE)
