= Georgi Adamia =

Georgian footballer

Personal information
- Full name: Georgi Adamia
- Date of birth: 10 March 1981 (age 45)
- Place of birth: Tbilisi, Georgian SSR
- Height: 1.75 m (5 ft 9 in)
- Position: Forward

Team information
- Current team: Georgia U21 (caretaker)

Senior career*
Years	Team	Apps	(Gls)
1998–2001	TSU Tbilisi	55	(13)
2001–2004	WIT Georgia	110	(25)
2004–2008	Neftchi Baku	94	(29)
2008–2010	FC Baku	28	(2)
2010–2012	FK Qarabağ	72	(29)
2012–2013	Inter Baku	5	(1)
2013–2014	Zestaponi	8	(2)
2014	Sioni Bolnisi	8	(0)

International career
2001–2002	Georgia U21	7	(2)

Managerial career
- 2026–: Georgia U21 (caretaker)
- * Club domestic league appearances and goals

Georgi Adamia (Georgian: გიორგი ადამია; born 10 March 1981) is a former Georgian football forward, currently working as an acting head coach of the Georgia U21 team.

In 2010, he became most capped foreign player in Azerbaijan Premier League.

== Career ==
=== Club ===
==== WIT Georgia ====
Georgi Adamia started his career in his home country Georgia, in the club FC WIT Georgia. In 2004, the club won the Umaglesi Liga championship.

==== Neftchi Baku ====
After this, Adamia was noticed by Azerbaijan champions Neftchi Baku and he was bought by the club. With Neftchi, Adamia won the Azerbaijan Premier League Championship once, and was a runner-up once. He also was a runner up of the CIS Cup in 2005, and the top goalscorer of that competition. In 2006, he helped his side win the CIS Cup.

== Career statistics ==
=== Club ===
As of 17 August 2014

Appearances and goals by club, season and competition
Club	Season	League			National Cup		Continental		Other		Total	
Club	Season	Division	Apps	Goals	Apps	Goals	Apps	Goals	Apps	Goals	Apps	Goals
Neftchi Baku	2004–05	Azerbaijan Premier League	17	7			0	0	–		17	7
Neftchi Baku	2005–06	Azerbaijan Premier League	24	3			3	0	–		27	3
Neftchi Baku	2006–07	Azerbaijan Premier League	20	10			–		–		20	10
Neftchi Baku	2007–08	Azerbaijan Premier League	25	9			2	0	–		27	9
Neftchi Baku	2008–09	Azerbaijan Premier League	8	0			6	1	–		14	1
Neftchi Baku	Total		94	29			11	1	-	-	105	30
Baku	2008–09	Azerbaijan Premier League	12	2			–		–		12	2
Baku	2009–10	Azerbaijan Premier League	16	0			6	0	–		22	0
Baku	Total		28	2			6	0	-	-	34	2
Qarabağ	2009–10	Azerbaijan Premier League	10	4			0	0	–		10	4
Qarabağ	2010–11	Azerbaijan Premier League	31	18	1	0	8	1	–		40	19
Qarabağ	2011–12	Azerbaijan Premier League	28	6	4	1	6	0	–		38	7
Qarabağ	Total		69	28	5	1	14	1	-	-	88	30
Inter Baku	2012–13	Azerbaijan Premier League	5	1	0	0	4	0	–		9	1
Zestaponi	2013–14	Umaglesi Liga	8	2	1	0	–		–		9	2
Sioni Bolnisi	2013–14	Umaglesi Liga	7	0	1	0	–		–		8	0
Sioni Bolnisi	2014–15	Umaglesi Liga	1	0	0	0	2	0	–		3	0
Sioni Bolnisi	Total		8	0	1	0	2	0	-	-	11	0
Career total			212	62	7	1	37	2	-	-	256	65

== Honours ==
=== Club ===
WIT Georgia

- Umaglesi Liga (1): 2004

Neftchi Baku

- Azerbaijan Premier League (1): 2005
- CIS Cup (1): 2006

=== Individual ===
- CIS Cup top goalscorer: 2005
- Azerbaijan Premier League top goalscorer: 2010-11
