= Rashad Sadygov =

Azerbaijani footballer (born 1982)

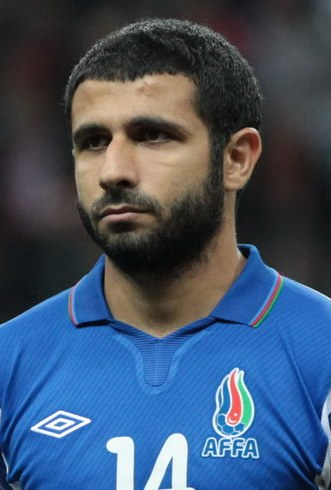

Personal information
- Full name: Rashad Farhad oglu Sadigov
- Date of birth: 16 June 1982 (age 44)
- Place of birth: Baku, Azerbaijan SSR, Soviet Union
- Height: 1.81 m (5 ft 11 in)
- Position: Centre-back

Team information
- Current team: Zira (manager)

Youth career
- 1992–1999: Sharur FK

Senior career*
Years	Team	Apps	(Gls)
2000–2001	Turan Tovuz	9	(0)
2001–2002	Neftchi Baku	24	(0)
2002–2003	Foolad	20	(0)
2003–2005	Neftchi Baku	61	(1)
2005–2006	Kayserispor	10	(0)
2006–2008	Neftchi Baku	40	(7)
2008–2009	Kocaelispor	16	(0)
2009–2010	Qarabağ	20	(1)
2010–2011	Eskişehirspor	5	(0)
2011–2020	Qarabağ	218	(9)
Total		423	(18)

International career
1999–2000	Azerbaijan U18	3	(0)
2000–2001	Azerbaijan U21	5	(0)
2001–2017	Azerbaijan	111	(5)

Managerial career
- 2016–2018: Qarabağ U19
- 2018: Azerbaijan U21
- 2020–: Zira
- * Club domestic league appearances and goals

Rashad Sadygov (Azerbaijani: Rəşad Sadıqov; born 16 June 1982) is an Azerbaijani football manager and former player who played as a centre-back. He is currently manager of the Azerbaijan Premier League side Zira.

Sadigov is the most capped player in the history of Azerbaijan national team with 111 games. He captained the team since 2004 and is widely recognized as one of the best players in the history of Azerbaijan, as he won the national league title six times and was selected as the footballer of the year six times. He played in UEFA Europa League and UEFA Champions League for FK Qarabağ.

== Early life ==
Sadigov began playing football during his school years at Vagif Pashayev-led Youth Football Sports School at the age of 10. He also spent time playing football for the clubs Sharur, the Air Force team, and Real Baku, all of which are based in Baku.

== Club career ==
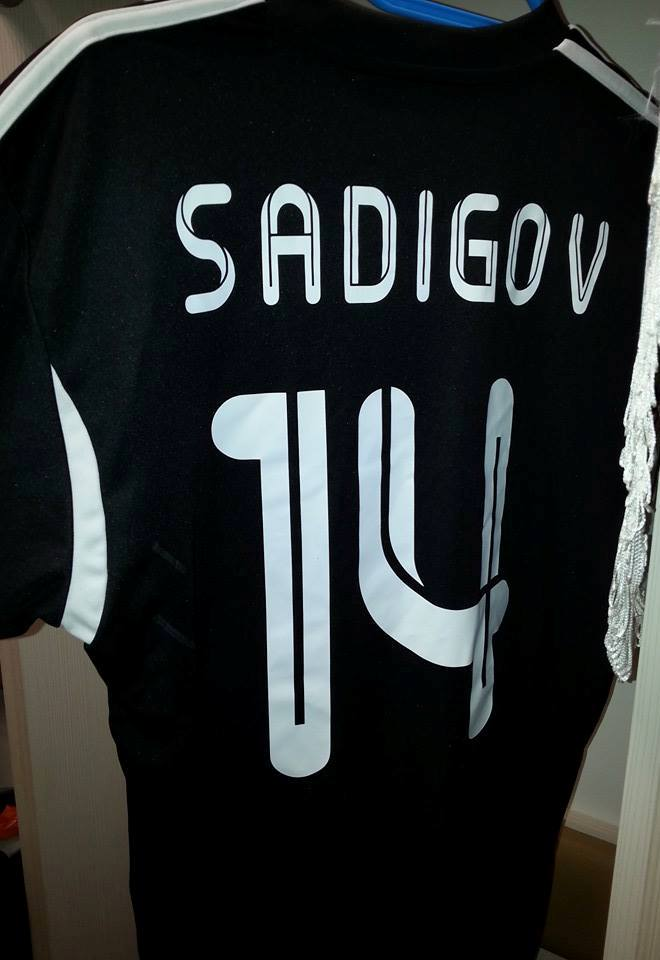
Rashad Sadygov's Qarabag shirt in the 2013–14 season.

In 2000, Sadigov signed his first professional contract with PFK Turan Tovuz, but played only nine games. At that time, he also played for the Azerbaijan Under-21 football team. At the end of the 2000/01 season, the defender was transferred to PFC Neftchi.

He played for Foolad F.C. in Iran's Premier Football League in 2002. After his comeback to Neftchi, Rashad won the national championship and cup and succeeded in passing the first qualification round of the Champions League with the black-and-whites. He played 8 games in European cups for Neftchi (two in the UEFA Cup qualifying during the 2001–02 season, two in the UEFA Champions League qualifying rounds in the 2004–05, and four appearances during the 2005–06 season of the same competition).

He traveled to Turkey to play for Kayserispor for the 2005–06 season. He was loaned back to Neftchi in January 2006. He played once at the start of 2006/07 season, but planned to go back with Neftchi, again. Sadigov failed to notice that the Association of Football Federations of Azerbaijan had changed the deadline of the transfer window, so he changed to play basketball to keep his fitness.

On 23 January 2009, Sadygov returned to the Turkish Süper Lig to join Kocaelispor on a six-month contract after he was kicked out from PFC Neftchi by the head coach Hans-Jürgen Gede in December 2008. Rashad made his debut for Kocaelispor in their 4–0 victory over Hacettepe on 25 January 2009.

In July 2009, Sadigov briefly returned to FK Qarabağ to help them in UEFA Europa League and scored a magnificent goal against Rosenborg BK. He also scored against FC Honka after delivering a powerful free kick. As a result, he signed a one-year contract with Karabakh, after the club's impressive performance in the UEFA Europa League.

In August 2010, he signed a 2-year contract with Turkish Super Lig outfit Eskişehirspor. However, following a string of injuries, he failed to get a regular place in Eskişehirspor's defence, which caused him to seek a new club.

After being heavily linked with a move back to FK Qarabağ, Sadigov joined Qarabağ on 11 February 2011. He helped his team to qualify for UEFA Europa League and UEFA Champions League. He played 5 times in UEFA Europa League group stages and one time in the UEFA Champions League group stage.

On 21 June 2020, Sadigov announced his retirement.

== International career ==
Sadigov made his Azerbaijan debut on 6 October 2001, against Sweden during 2002 FIFA World Cup qualification (UEFA). Sadigov was Azerbaijan's vice-captain under Carlos Alberto Torres, deputising in the absence of regular captain Gurban Gurbanov, but following the retirement of Gurban Gurbanov from football, Sadygov was named as full-time captain in March 2004. Sadigov is the most capped Azerbaijani player of all time.

== Managerial career ==
On 13 December 2017, Sadigov was appointed as manager of Azerbaijan U21.

On 17 July 2020, Sadigov was announced as Zira's new manager on a three-year contract.

== Personal life ==
In 2006, as a result of missing the registration deadline for the Azerbaijani football club side Neftchi Baku, Sadigov played basketball for local club BK NTD.

Sadigov was one of the favorite players among Kocaelispor supporters and nicknamed "Terminator" by local media. He also featured as one of the official faces for Azerbaijan Premier League promotion campaign in 2010.

== Career statistics ==
=== Club ===
As of match played 11 July 2017

Appearances and goals by club, season and competition
Club	Season	League			National cup		League cup		Continental		Other		Total	
Club	Season	Division	Apps	Goals	Apps	Goals	Apps	Goals	Apps	Goals	Apps	Goals	Apps	Goals
Turan-Tovuz	2000–01	Top League	9	0			–		–		–		9	0
Neftchi Baku	2001–02	Top League	24	0			–		0	0	–		24	0
Foolad	2002–03	Pro League	20	0			–		–		–		20	0
Neftchi Baku	2003–04	Top League	16	1			–		–		–		16	1
Neftchi Baku	2004–05	Top League	32	0			–		4	0	–		36	0
Neftchi Baku	2005–06	Top League	13	0			–		4	0	–		17	0
Neftchi Baku	Total		61	1			0	0	8	0	0	0	69	1
Kayserispor	2005–06	Süper Lig	9	0	1	0	–		–		–		10	0
Kayserispor	2006–07	Süper Lig	1	0	0	0	–		5	0	–		6	0
Kayserispor	Total		10	0	1	0	0	0	5	0	0	0	16	0
Neftchi Baku	2006–07	Top League	12	2			–		–		–		12	2
Neftchi Baku	2007–08	Premier League	19	5			–		2	1	–		21	6
Neftchi Baku	2008–09	Premier League	9	0			–		6	1	–		15	1
Neftchi Baku	Total		40	7			0	0	8	2	0	0	48	9
Kocaelispor	2008–09	Süper Lig	16	0	0	0	–		–		–		16	0
Qarabağ	2009–10	Premier League	20	1	2	1	–		4	2	–		26	4
Eskişehirspor	2010–11	Süper Lig	5	0	0	0	–		–		–		5	0
Qarabağ	2010–11	Premier League	14	0	0	0	–		8	1	–		22	1
Qarabağ	2011–12	Premier League	27	2	4	0	–		6	0	–		37	2
Qarabağ	2012–13	Premier League	25	3	5	0	–		–		–		30	3
Qarabağ	2013–14	Premier League	25	0	1	0	–		8	0	–		34	0
Qarabağ	2014–15	Premier League	22	0	5	0	–		10	0	–		37	0
Qarabağ	2015–16	Premier League	19	2	3	0	–		12	0	–		34	2
Qarabağ	2016–17	Premier League	14	0	1	0	–		11	2	–		26	2
Qarabağ	2017–18	Premier League	18	0	0	0	–		1	0	–		1	0
Qarabağ	Total		164	7	19	0	0	0	60	5	0	0	243	10
Career total			369	16	22	1	0	0	81	7	0	0	454	24

=== International ===
Appearances and goals by national team and year
National team	Year	Apps	Goals
Azerbaijan	2001	1	0
Azerbaijan	2002	9	0
Azerbaijan	2003	6	0
Azerbaijan	2004	10	2
Azerbaijan	2005	8	0
Azerbaijan	2006	3	1
Azerbaijan	2007	2	0
Azerbaijan	2008	10	0
Azerbaijan	2009	11	0
Azerbaijan	2010	8	1
Azerbaijan	2011	9	0
Azerbaijan	2012	4	0
Azerbaijan	2013	8	0
Azerbaijan	2014	6	0
Azerbaijan	2015	7	0
Azerbaijan	2016	4	0
Azerbaijan	2017	5	1
Total		111	5

Scores and results list Azerbaijan's goal tally first, score column indicates score after each Sadygov goal.

List of international goals scored by Rashad Sadygov
No.	Date	Venue	Opponent	Score	Result	Competition
1	28 March 2004	Almaty Central Stadium, Almaty, Kazakhstan	Kazakhstan	3–2	3–2	Friendly
2	4 September 2004	Tofiq Bahramov Stadium, Baku, Azerbaijan	Wales	1–1	1–1	2006 FIFA World Cup Qualification
3	12 March 2006	Tofiq Bahramov Stadium, Baku, Azerbaijan	Turkey	1–0	1–1	Friendly
4	12 October 2010	Tofiq Bahramov Stadium, Baku, Azerbaijan	Turkey	1–0	1–0	UEFA Euro 2012 qualification
5	4 September 2017	Bakcell Arena, Baku, Azerbaijan	San Marino	5–1	5–1	2018 FIFA World Cup Qualification

=== Managerial ===
Managerial record by team and tenure
Team	From	To	Record					Ref
Team	From	To	P	W	D	L	Win %	Ref
Zira	17 July 2020	31 May 2023	107	41	37	29	38.3	
Total			107	41	37	29	38.3	—

== Honours ==
=== As player ===
Neftchi Baku

- Azerbaijan Premier League: 2003–04, 2004–05
- Azerbaijan Cup: 2001–02, 2003–04

Kayserispor

- UEFA Intertoto Cup: 2006

Qarabağ

- Azerbaijan Premier League: 2013–14, 2014–15, 2015–16, 2016–17, 2017–18, 2018–19, 2019–20
- Azerbaijan Cup: 2014-15, 2015-16, 2016–17

Individual

- Azerbaijani Footballer of the Year: 2004, 2005, 2010, 2013, 2016, 2017

=== As manager ===
Zira

- Azerbaijan Cup: 2021–22 runners-up

== See also ==
- List of men's footballers with 100 or more international caps
