= Elnur Allahverdiyev =

Azerbaijani footballer (born 1983)

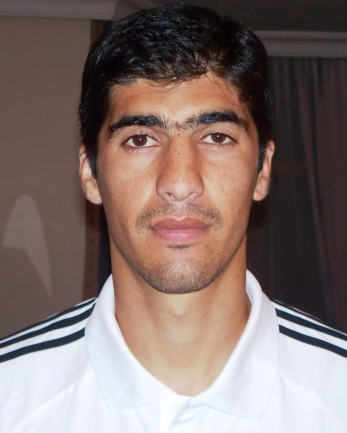

Personal information
- Full name: Elnur Fazahir Allahverdiyev
- Date of birth: 2 November 1983 (age 43)
- Place of birth: Baku, Soviet Union
- Height: 1.84 m (6 ft 0 in)
- Position: Defender

Senior career*
Years	Team	Apps	(Gls)
2003–2004	Shafa Baku	20	(0)
2004–2005	MOIK Baku	30	(0)
2005–2006	Turan Tovuz	10	(1)
2006–2009	Neftchi Baku	59	(3)
2009–2010	Qarabağ	35	(1)
2010–2013	Khazar Lankaran	78	(2)
2013	→ Gabala (loan)	11	(0)
2014	Gabala	13	(0)
2014–2015	Neftchi Baku	6	(0)

International career^{‡}
2008–2014	Azerbaijan	39	(0)
- * Club domestic league appearances and goals as of 7 January 2015 ‡ National team caps and goals as of 7 January 2015

Elnur Allahverdiyev (born 2 November 1983) is a football defender from Azerbaijan who last played for Neftchi Baku. He is also a member of Azerbaijan national football team.

== Career ==
In 2008, Allahverdiyev scored the only goal in Neftchi Baku's 1–0 win against Germinal Beerschot Antwerpen to advance to the third round of Intertoto Cup 2008, where they faced FC Vaslui from Romania.

=== Gabala ===
In September 2013, Allahverdiyev joined Gabala on an initial six-month-long loan from Khazar Lankaran. On 8 January, Allahverdiyev made his move to Gabala, signing a one-year deal.

=== Neftchi Baku return ===
On 11 September 2014, after being frozen out of the Gabala team, Allahverdiyev signed a two-year contract with Neftchi Baku. After just four months with Neftchi, Allahverdiyev was released by the club in January 2015.

== Career statistics ==
=== Club ===
As of 7 January 2015

Appearances and goals by club, season and competition
Club	Season	League			National Cup		Continental		Other		Total	
Club	Season	Division	Apps	Goals	Apps	Goals	Apps	Goals	Apps	Goals	Apps	Goals
Shafa Baku	2003–04	Azerbaijan Top League	20	0			–		–		20	0
MOIK Baku	2004–05	Azerbaijan Top League	30	0			–		–		30	0
Turan-Tovuz	2005–06	Azerbaijan Top League	10	1			–		–		10	1
Neftçi Baku	2005–06	Azerbaijan Top League	9	0			–		–		9	0
Neftçi Baku	2006–07	Azerbaijan Top League	14	0			–		–		14	0
Neftçi Baku	2007–08	Azerbaijan Top League	21	2			2	0	–		23	2
Neftçi Baku	2008–09	Azerbaijan Premier League	5	0			6	1	–		11	1
Neftçi Baku	Total		49	2			8	1	-	-	57	3
Qarabağ	2008–09	Azerbaijan Premier League	11	0			–		–		11	0
Qarabağ	2009–10	Azerbaijan Premier League	24	1			5	0	–		29	1
Qarabağ	Total		35	1			5	0	-	-	40	1
Khazar Lankaran	2010–11	Azerbaijan Premier League	28	1	3	0	2	0	–		33	1
Khazar Lankaran	2011–12	Azerbaijan Premier League	24	1	2	0	1	0	–		27	1
Khazar Lankaran	2012–13	Azerbaijan Premier League	21	0	6	0	3	0	–		30	0
Khazar Lankaran	2013–14	Azerbaijan Premier League	5	0	0	0	3	0	0	0	8	0
Khazar Lankaran	Total		78	2	11	0	9	0	0	0	98	2
Gabala (loan)	2013–14	Azerbaijan Premier League	11	0	0	0	–		–		11	0
Gabala	2013–14	Azerbaijan Premier League	11	0	0	0	–		–		11	0
Gabala	2014–15	Azerbaijan Premier League	0	0	0	0	1	0	–		1	0
Gabala	Total		11	0	0	0	1	0	-	-	12	0
Neftçi Baku	2014–15	Azerbaijan Premier League	6	0	0	0	0	0	–		6	0
Career total			271	7	11+	0	23	1	0	0	305+	8

=== International ===
As of match played 13 October 2014

Azerbaijan national team
Year	Apps	Goals
2008	2	0
2009	6	0
2010	9	0
2011	6	0
2012	5	0
2013	7	0
2014	4	0
Total	39	0

== Honours ==
Qarabağ

- Azerbaijan Cup: 2008–09

Khazar Lankaran

- Azerbaijan Cup: 2010–11
