= Huseyn Mahammadov =

Azerbaijani footballer (born 1974)

Hüseyn Məhəmmədov
Personal information
- Full name: Hüseyn Məhəmməd oğlu Məhəmmədov
- Date of birth: 22 August 1974 (age 52)
- Height: 1.79 m (5 ft 10 1/2 in)
- Position: Goalkeeper

Senior career*
Years	Team	Apps	(Gls)
1992–1996	Turan Tovuz	14	(0)
1996–2000	Gäncä	92	(0)
2000–2002	Shamkir	32	(0)
2002–2003	Machine Sazi		
2003–2005	Neftchi Baku	40	(0)
2005–2006	Olimpik Baku	10	(0)
2006	Karvan	5	(0)
2007–2008	Neftchi Baku	11	(0)
2008–2009	Standard Baku	18	(0)

International career
1998–2003	Azerbaijan	12	(0)
- * Club domestic league appearances and goals

Hüseyn Məhəmmədov (born 22 August 1974) is a retired Azerbaijani football player. During his career he won the Azerbaijan Premier League seven times and the Azerbaijan Cup four times. He also played for Azerbaijan national team.

== Career statistics ==
As of 31 August 2013

Club performance			League		Cup		Continental		Total	
Season	Club	League	Apps	Goals	Apps	Goals	Apps	Goals	Apps	Goals
Azerbaijan			League		Azerbaijan Cup		Europe		Total	
1992	Turan Tovuz	Azerbaijan Premier League	5	0			-		5	0
1993	Turan Tovuz	Azerbaijan Premier League	1	0			-		1	0
1993–94	Turan Tovuz	Azerbaijan Premier League	2	0			-		2	0
1994–95	Turan Tovuz	Azerbaijan Premier League	1	0					1	0
1995–96	Turan Tovuz	Azerbaijan Premier League	5	0			-		5	0
1996–97	Gäncä	Azerbaijan Premier League	27	0			-		27	0
1997–98	Gäncä	Azerbaijan Premier League	15	0					15	0
1998–99	Gäncä	Azerbaijan Premier League	33	0					33	0
1999–2000	Gäncä	Azerbaijan Premier League	17	0			2	0	19	0
2000–01	Shamkir	Azerbaijan Premier League	10	0			0	0	10	0
2001–02	Shamkir	Azerbaijan Premier League	22	0			2	0	24	0
Iran			League		Hazfi Cup		Asia		Total	
2002–03	Machine Sazi Dabiri Tabriz	Azadegan League					-			
2003–04	Machine Sazi Dabiri Tabriz	Azadegan League					-			
Azerbaijan			League		Azerbaijan Cup		Europe		Total	
2003–04	Neftchi Baku	Azerbaijan Premier League	18	0			-		18	0
2004–05	Neftchi Baku	Azerbaijan Premier League	22	0			4	0	26	0
2005–06	Olimpik Baku	Azerbaijan Premier League	10	0			-		10	0
2006–07	Karvan	Azerbaijan Premier League	5	0			0	0	5	0
2006–07	Neftchi Baku	Azerbaijan Premier League	9	0			-		9	0
2007–08	Neftchi Baku	Azerbaijan Premier League	2	0			0	0	2	0
2008–09	Standard Baku	Azerbaijan Premier League	18	0			-		18	0
Total	Azerbaijan		222	0			0	0	222	0
Total	Iran									
Career total			222	0			0	0	222	0

== Honours ==
Turan Tovuz

- Azerbaijan Premier League: 1993–94

Gäncä

- Azerbaijan Premier League: 1997–98, 1998–99
- Azerbaijan Cup: 1996–97, 1997–98, 1999–00

Shamkir

- Azerbaijan Premier League: 2000–01, 2001–02

Neftchi Baku

- Azerbaijan Premier League: 2003–04, 2004–05
- Azerbaijan Cup: 2003–04

== National team statistics ==
Azerbaijan national team
Year	Apps	Goals
1998	4	0
1999	1	0
2000	2	0
2001	0	0
2002	2	0
2003	3	0
Total	12	0
