= Agil Mammadov (footballer, born 1972) =

Azerbaijani footballer and manager

Personal information
- Full name: Agil Mammadov
- Date of birth: 12 April 1972 (age 54)
- Place of birth: Sumgayit, Azerbaijan SSR
- Height: 1.72 m (5 ft 7 1/2 in)
- Position: Midfielder

Team information
- Current team: MOIK Baku (manager)

Senior career*
Years	Team	Apps	(Gls)
1989–1994	Khazar Sumgayit	85	(10)
1994–1995	Turan Tovuz	3	(0)
1995	Khazar Sumgayit	5	(0)
1995–1996	Kur Nur	7	(0)
1996	Turan Tovuz	3	(1)
1996–1997	Khazar Sumgayit	28	(7)
1997–1998	Shamkir	8	(0)
1998–2000	Kimyachi Sumgayit	50	(10)
2000–2002	Shamkir	35	(4)
2003–2004	Neftchi Baku	24	(6)
2004–2005	Qarabağ	21	(4)
2005–2007	Neftchi Baku	33	(1)
2007	Baku	3	(0)
2007–2008	Neftchi Baku	22	(1)
2008–2009	Karvan	18	(1)
2009–2010	Standard Sumgayit	14	(0)
Total		359	(45)

International career
2004–2005	Azerbaijan	7	(0)

Managerial career
- 2013–2015: Sumgayit
- 2016–2017: Mil-Muğan
- 2017–: MOIK Baku
- * Club domestic league appearances and goals

Agil Mammadov (Azerbaijani: Aqil Məmmədov), born 12 April 1972 is an Azerbaijani former football player and current manager. He most recently was manager of Sumgayit FK in the Azerbaijan Premier League.

== Managerial career ==
On 8 October 2015, Mammadov resigned as manager of Sumgayit.

== Honours ==
Shamkir

- Azerbaijan Premier League (1): 2001–02

Neftchi Baku

- Azerbaijan Premier League (1): 2003–04
- Azerbaijan Cup (1): 2003–04
