= Marcos Ferreira Xavier =

Brazilian-Azerbaijani footballer (born 1982)

Marcos
Personal information
- Full name: Marcos Ferreira Xavier
- Date of birth: 18 February 1982 (age 44)
- Place of birth: Rio de Janeiro, Brazil
- Height: 1.80 m (5 ft 11 in)
- Position: Midfielder

Senior career*
Years	Team	Apps	(Gls)
2005	Corinthians Alagoano		
2005–2010	Karvan	70	(12)
2007	→ Neftchi Baku (loan)	4	(0)
2014	São Gonçalo	13	(0)

International career^{‡}
2007	Azerbaijan	2	(0)
- * Club domestic league appearances and goals as of 30 December 2017 ‡ National team caps and goals as of 18 March 2014

Marcos Ferreira Xavier (Azerbaijani: Markos Ferrera Xave; born 18 February 1982) is a former professional footballer who played as a midfielder. Born in Brazil, he played for the Azerbaijan national team.

== Career ==
Marcos transferred to FK Karvan from Corinthians Alagoano in summer 2005. In the 2007 winter transfer window Marcos moved to Neftchi Baku on loan till the end of the season.

== International career ==
After taking Azerbaijani citizenship in 2007, Marcos made his debut for Azerbaijan on 7 March 2007 in a 1–0 victory over Uzbekistan in the Alma TV Cup. His second, and last appearance for Azerbaijan, came four days later against Kyrgyzstan, also in the Alma TV Cup.

== Career statistics ==
As of 31 August 2013

Club performance			League		Cup		Continental		Total	
Season	Club	League	Apps	Goals	Apps	Goals	Apps	Goals	Apps	Goals
Azerbaijan			League		Azerbaijan Cup		Europe		Total	
2005–06	Karvan	Azerbaijan Premier League	21	1			0	0	21	1
2006–07	Karvan	Azerbaijan Premier League	12	6			3	0	15	6
2007–08	Karvan	Azerbaijan Premier League	12	2			-		12	2
2007–08	Neftchi Baku (loan)	Azerbaijan Premier League	4	0			-		4	0
2008–09	Karvan	Azerbaijan Premier League	0	0			-		0	0
2009–10	Karvan	Azerbaijan Premier League	25	3			-		25	3
Total	Azerbaijan		74	12			3	0	77	12
Career total			74	12			3	0	77	12
