= Konstantin Gusev =

Russian footballer

Personal information
- Full name: Konstantin Nikolayevich Gusev
- Date of birth: 14 June 1971 (age 55)
- Height: 1.83 m (6 ft 0 in)
- Position: Goalkeeper

Senior career*
Years	Team	Apps	(Gls)
1989	FC Metallurg Novokuznetsk	22	(0)
1992	FC Metallurg Novokuznetsk	8	(0)
1993–1994	FC Kuzbass Kemerovo	34	(0)
1995	FC Metallurg-ZapSib Novokuznetsk	6	(0)
1997	FC Kuzbass Kemerovo	5	(0)
2004–2005	FK Inter Baku	11	(0)
2005–2006	Neftchi Baku	0	(0)
2009	FC Kemerovo (D4)		
2011–2012	FC KUZBASS Kemerovo	0	(0)
- * Club domestic league appearances and goals

Konstantin Nikolayevich Gusev (Russian: Константин Николаевич Гусев; born 14 June 1971) is a former Russian football goalkeeper.

== Club career ==
He made his debut in the Soviet Second League for FC Metallurg Novokuznetsk in 1989.

He played two seasons in the Russian Football National League for FC Metallurg Novokuznetsk and FC Kuzbass Kemerovo.
