= Ruslan Abishov =

Azerbaijani footballer (born 1987)

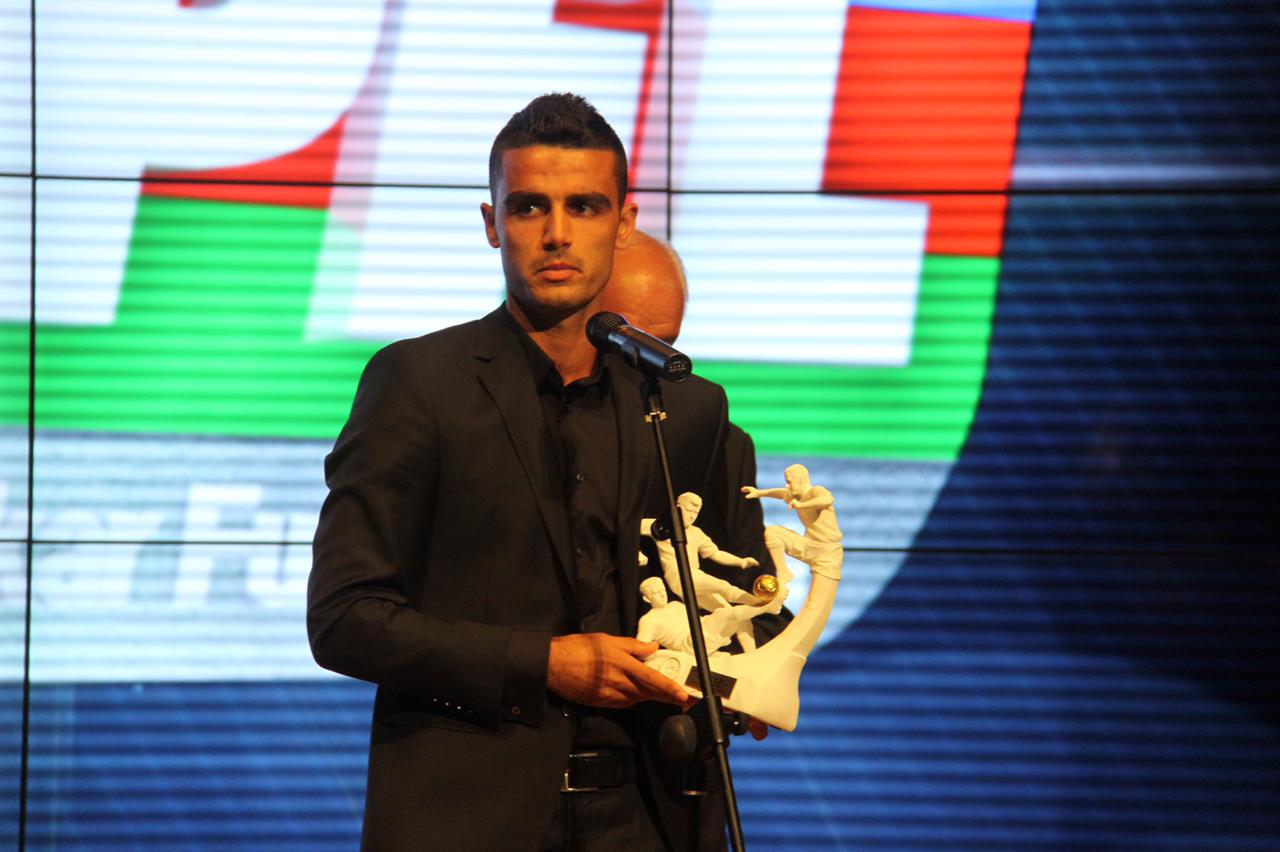
- The best midfielder of Azerbaijan 2011

Personal information
- Full name: Ruslan Ibrahim oglu Abishov
- Date of birth: 10 October 1987 (age 39)
- Place of birth: Baku, Azerbaijan SSR, Soviet Union
- Height: 1.87 m (6 ft 1 1/2 in)
- Positions: Centre back; defensive midfielder

Youth career
- 2003–2006: Neftchi Baku

Senior career*
Years	Team	Apps	(Gls)
2006–2012	Neftchi Baku	116	(8)
2012–2013	Khazar Lankaran	17	(1)
2013–2015	Rubin Kazan	1	(0)
2014	→ Gabala (loan)	13	(1)
2015–2016	Gabala	31	(5)
2016–2017	Inter Baku	13	(5)
2017–2019	Neftchi Baku	39	(6)
2019–2021	Sabah	13	(0)
2021–2023	Zira	2	(0)

International career
2005–2007	Azerbaijan U19	3	(0)
2007–2009	Azerbaijan U21	8	(1)
2017	Azerbaijan U23	5	(1)
2009–2018	Azerbaijan	59	(4)
Medal record
Men's football
Representing Azerbaijan
Islamic Solidarity Games
Winner	2017 Azerbaijan
- * Club domestic league appearances and goals

Ruslan Abishov (Azerbaijani: Ruslan Ibrahim oğlu Abışov; born 10 October 1987) is an Azerbaijani former professional footballer who played as a defender.

== Career ==
=== Club ===
Abishov can be considered a product of the Neftchi Baku youth system. He has spent most of his career in Neftchi. He became the winner of Azerbaijan Premier League in 2010–11, 2011–12 seasons in Neftchi, then he was transferred to Khazar Lankaran. On 26 February 2013 he signed a contract with Rubin Kazan for 2.5 years.

On 24 June 2014, Abishov joined Azerbaijan Premier League side Gabala FK on a six-month loan deal, before signing a six-month contract with the club in following the completion of the loan deal.

On 14 September 2015, Abishov re-signed for Gabala follow complications to his registration at Khazar Lankaran. Following the conclusion of the 2015–16 season, Abishov left Gabala having turned down a new contract with the club.

On 29 June 2016, Abishov signed a one-year contract with Inter Baku. On 12 January 2017, Abıshov signed a six-month contract with Neftchi Baku. Abishov extended his contract in summer of 2017 and captained the team during the 2017–18 season when Neftchi claimed bronze medals in the season, highest league result since 2013. On 10 June 2019, Neftchi released Abishov from his contract by mutual consent.

On 13 June 2019, Abishov signed a two-year contract with Sabah FC.

On 26 June 2021, Zira FK, announced the signing of Abishov.

=== International ===
Abıshov made his debut for Azerbaijan on 5 September 2009 against Finland in 2010 WC qualification. He scored his first goal on 18 November 2009 against Czech in a friendly match. He finished his football career in 2023

== Career statistics ==
=== Club ===
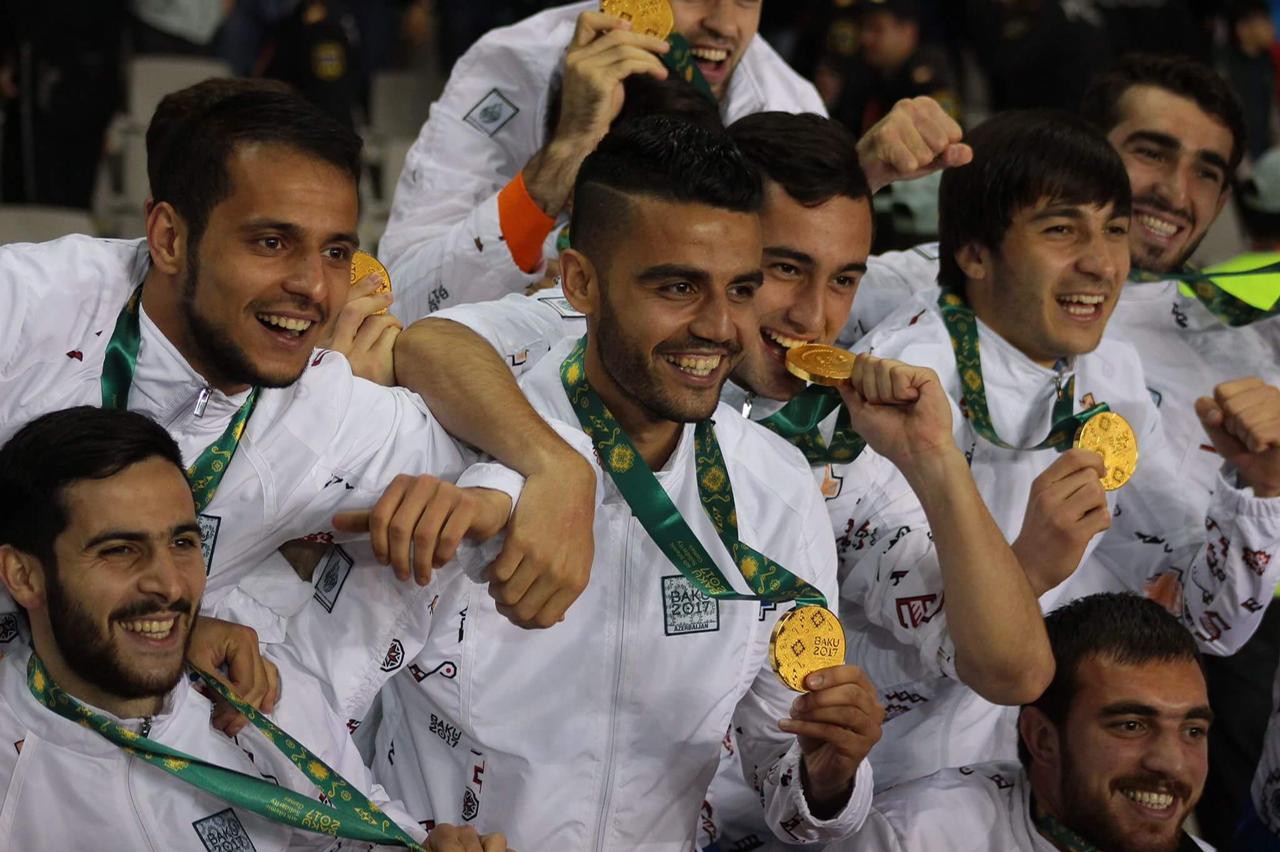
Ruslan Abishov as champion and gold medalist of 2017 Islamic Solidarity Games

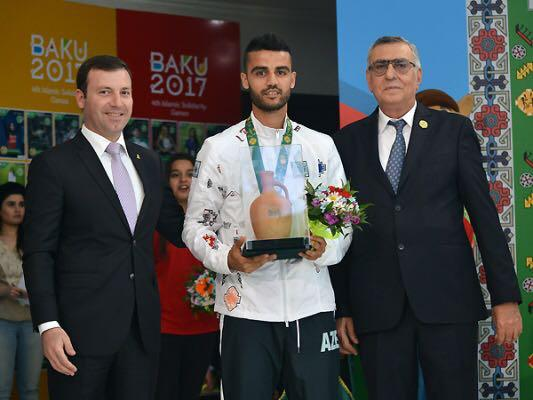
Ruslan Abishov as champion and gold medalist of 2017 Islamic Solidarity Games

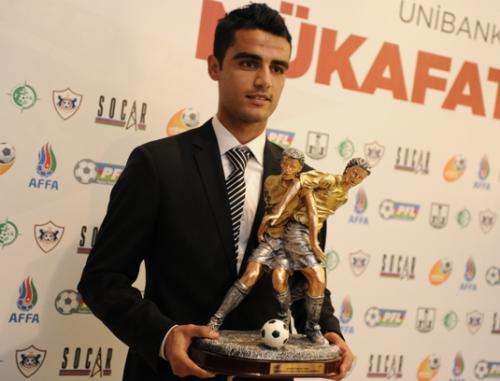
Ruslan Abishov as The Best Defender of 2010–11 Azerbaijan Premier League

As of match played 24 February

Appearances and goals by club, season and competition
Club	Season	League			National Cup		Continental		Total	
Club	Season	Division	Apps	Goals	Apps	Goals	Apps	Goals	Apps	Goals
Neftchi Baku	2006–07	Azerbaijan Premier League	7	0			-		7	0
Neftchi Baku	2007–08	Azerbaijan Premier League	12	0			0	0	12	0
Neftchi Baku	2008–09	Azerbaijan Premier League	16	0			6	0	22	0
Neftchi Baku	2009–10	Azerbaijan Premier League	25	0			-		25	0
Neftchi Baku	2010–11	Azerbaijan Premier League	26	2	3	0	-		29	2
Neftchi Baku	2011–12	Azerbaijan Premier League	30	5	5	0	2	0	37	5
Neftchi Baku	Total		116	7	8	0	8	0	132	7
Khazar Lankaran	2012–13	Azerbaijan Premier League	17	1	1	0	4	1	22	2
Rubin Kazan	2012–13	Russian Premier League	1	0	0	0	0	0	1	0
Rubin Kazan	2013–14	Russian Premier League	0	0	0	0	5	0	5	0
Rubin Kazan	Total		1	0	0	0	5	0	6	0
Gabala (loan)	2014–15	Azerbaijan Premier League	13	1	1	0	2	0	16	1
Gabala	2014–15	Azerbaijan Premier League	14	3	2	0	0	0	16	3
Gabala	2015–16	Azerbaijan Premier League	17	0	2	0	0	0	19	0
Gabala	Total		31	3	4	0	0	0	35	3
Inter Baku	2016–17	Azerbaijan Premier League	13	5	3	2	–		16	7
Neftchi Baku	2016–17	Azerbaijan Premier League	9	0	0	0	0	0	9	0
Neftchi Baku	2017–18	Azerbaijan Premier League	27	5	3	0	–		30	5
Neftchi Baku	2018–19	Azerbaijan Premier League	3	1	0	0	2	0	5	1
Neftchi Baku	Total		39	6	3	0	2	0	44	6
Sabah	2019–20	Azerbaijan Premier League	8	0	0	0	–		8	0
Sabah	2020–21	Azerbaijan Premier League	5	0	0	0	–		5	0
Sabah	Total		13	0	0	0	-	-	13	0
Zira	2021–22	Azerbaijan Premier League	1	0	1	0	–		2	0
Zira	2022–23	Azerbaijan Premier League	1	0	1	0	0	0	2	0
Zira	Total		2	0	2	0	0	0	4	0
Career total			245	23	22	2	21	1	285	26

=== International ===
Azerbaijan national team
Year	Apps	Goals
2009	5	1
2010	7	0
2011	9	1
2012	9	1
2013	8	1
2014	6	0
2015	2	0
2016	3	0
2017	1	0
2018	6	0
Total	56	4

Statistics accurate as of match played 9 June 2018

=== International goals ===
No.	Date	Venue	Opponent	Score	Result	Competition	Ref.
1.	18 November 2009	Tahnoun bin Mohammed, Al Ain, United Arab Emirates	Czech Republic	2–0	2–0	Friendly	
2.	29 March 2011	King Baudouin Stadium, Brussels, Belgium	Belgium	1–1	4–1	UEFA Euro 2012 qualifying	
3.	7 September 2012	Tofiq Bahramov Stadium, Baku, Azerbaijan	Israel	1–1	1–1	2014 World Cup qualification	
4.	7 June 2013	Bakcell Arena, Baku, Azerbaijan	Luxembourg	1–0	1–1	2014 World Cup qualification	
Correct as of 7 October 2015

== Honours ==
=== Club ===
Neftchi Baku

- Azerbaijan Premier League: (2) 2010–11, 2011–12

=== International ===
Azerbaijan U23

- Islamic Solidarity Games: (1) 2017

=== Individual ===
- The best midfielder of Azerbaijan (1): 2010
- The best defender of Azerbaijan (1): 2011
- Azerbaijani Footballer of the Year (1): 2012
