= Vadim Boreț =

Moldovan footballer and manager

Personal information
- Full name: Vadim Boreț
- Date of birth: 5 September 1976 (age 50)
- Place of birth: Maramonovca, Moldavian SSR, Soviet Union
- Height: 1.72 m (5 ft 8 in)
- Position: Midfielder

Senior career*
| Years | Team | Apps | (Gls) |
| 1993–2001 | Zimbru Chişinău | 159 | (27) |
| 2001–2005 | Sheriff Tiraspol | 50 | (12) |
| 2004 | → Tiraspol (loan) | 13 | (0) |
| 2005 | → Obra Kościan (loan) | | |
| 2005 | → Dyskobolia (loan) | 2 | (0) |
| 2005–2008 | Neftchi Baku | 63 | (7) |
| 2008–2012 | Baku | 77 | (1) |
| Total | | 364 | (40) |

International career
| 1999–2011 | Moldova | 42 | (1) |

Managerial career
- 2013: Moldova U15
- 2013–2015: Moldova U16
- 2013–2015: Moldova U17
- 2016: Sfântul Gheorghe Suruceni
- 2016: CF Ungheni
- 2019: Noah
- * Club domestic league appearances and goals

Vadim Boreț (born 5 September 1976) is a Moldovan professional football manager and former player.

Boreț started his career at Zimbru Chişinău before moved to Transnistria for Sheriff Tiraspol.

In January 2005, he moved to Polish side Dyskobolia on loan. He also on loan at Tiraspol in the second half of 2003–04 season. In summer 2005, he tried his luck to move to Neftchi Baku.

== International career ==
He played 5 games for Moldova in 2006 FIFA World Cup qualifying. He was also a member of the team that participated in the 2002 FIFA World Cup qualifying and UEFA Euro 2004 qualifying campaigns.

He played his last match against Lithuania, on 16 August 2006, a friendly match, having made a total of 42 international appearances.

=== International goal ===
Scores and results list Moldova's goal tally first.

| # | Date | Venue | Opponent | Score | Result | Competition |
|---|---|---|---|---|---|---|
| 1. | 2 April 2003 | Sheriff Stadium, Tiraspol | Netherlands | 1–0 | 1–2 | UEFA Euro 2004 qualification |

== Honours ==
=== Player ===
Zimbru Chișinău

- Moldovan Super Liga: 1993–94, 1994–95, 1995–96, 1997–98, 1998–99, 1999–2000
- Moldovan Cup: 1996–97, 1997–98

Sheriff Tiraspol

- Moldovan Super Liga: 2001–02, 2002–03, 2003–04
- Moldovan Cup: 2001–02

FK Baku

- Azerbaijan Premier League: 2008–09
- Azerbaijan Cup: 2012
