= Farrukh Ismayilov =

Azerbaijani footballer (born 1978)

Personal information
- Full name: Farrukh Aladdin oglu Ismayilov
- Date of birth: 30 August 1978 (age 48)
- Place of birth: Azerbaijani SSR, Soviet Union
- Height: 1.78 m (5 ft 10 in)
- Position: Striker

Senior career*
| Years | Team | Apps | (Gls) |
| 1997–1999 | Dinamo Baku | 51 | (29) |
| 1999–2002 | Neftchi Baku | 54 | (20) |
| 2003 | Sanat Naft | - | (-) |
| 2003 | Volyn Lutsk | 11 | (1) |
| 2004 | FK Qarabağ | 3 | (1) |
| 2004–2006 | FK Karvan | 52 | (25) |
| 2006–2007 | Neftchi Baku | 17 | (5) |
| 2007–2008 | FK Olympik Baku | 21 | (2) |
| 2008–2009 | FC Gabala | 6 | (0) |
| 2009–2010 | FK Mughan | 31 | (3) |

International career^{‡}
| 1998–2007 | Azerbaijan | 35 | (5) |
- * Club domestic league appearances and goals as of 17 July 2009 ‡ National team caps and goals as of 1 December 2009

Farrukh Ismayilov (Azerbaijani: Fərrux İsmayılov; born 30 August 1978) is a retired Azerbaijani footballer who played as a striker.

Ismayilov made 35 appearances for the Azerbaijan national football team from 1998 to 2007.

== Career statistics ==
| Club performance | | | League | | Cup | | Continental | | Total | |
| Season | Club | League | Apps | Goals | Apps | Goals | Apps | Goals | Apps | Goals |
| Azerbaijan | | | League | | Azerbaijan Cup | | Europe | | Total | |
|---|---|---|---|---|---|---|---|---|---|---|
| 1997-98 | Dinamo Baku | Azerbaijan Premier League | 22 | 14 | | | - | | 24 | 14 |
| 1998-99 | Dinamo Baku | Azerbaijan Premier League | 29 | 15 | | | 2 | 0 | 29 | 15 |
| 1999–2000 | Neftchi Baku | Azerbaijan Premier League | 16 | 3 | | | 1 | 0 | 17 | 3 |
| 2000–01 | Neftchi Baku | Azerbaijan Premier League | 18 | 11 | | | 1 | 0 | 19 | 11 |
| 2001–02 | Neftchi Baku | Azerbaijan Premier League | 20 | 6 | | | 2 | 0 | 22 | 6 |
| Iran | | | League | | Hazfi Cup | | Asia | | Total | |
| 2002–03 | Sanat Naft Abadan | Iran Pro League | | | | | - | | | |
| Ukraine | | | League | | Ukrainian Cup | | Europe | | Total | |
| 2003–04 | Volyn Lutsk | Ukrainian Premier League | 11 | 1 | | | - | | 11 | 1 |
| Azerbaijan | | | League | | Azerbaijan Cup | | Europe | | Total | |
| 2003–04 | Qarabağ | Azerbaijan Premier League | 3 | 1 | | | - | | 3 | 1 |
| 2004–05 | FK Karvan | Azerbaijan Premier League | 31 | 17 | | | - | | 31 | 17 |
| 2005–06 | FK Karvan | Azerbaijan Premier League | 21 | 7 | | | 1 | 0 | 22 | 8 |
| 2006–07 | Neftchi Baku | Azerbaijan Premier League | 17 | 5 | | | - | | 17 | 5 |
| 2007–08 | Olimpik Baku | Azerbaijan Premier League | 21 | 2 | | | - | | 21 | 2 |
| 2008–09 | Gabala | Azerbaijan Premier League | 6 | 0 | | | - | | 6 | 0 |
| 2009–10 | Mughan | Azerbaijan Premier League | 26 | 3 | | | - | | 26 | 3 |
| Total | Azerbaijan | | 230 | 84 | | | 7 | 0 | 237 | 84 |
| Total | Iran | | | | | | | | | |
| Total | Ukraine | | 11 | 1 | | | - | | 11 | 1 |
| Career total | | | 241 | 85 | | | 7 | 0 | 248 | 85 |

== International goals ==
| # | Date | Venue | Opponent | Score | Result | Competition |
|---|---|---|---|---|---|---|
| 1. | 5 September 2001 | Baku, Azerbaijan | Macedonia | 1–1 | 1–1 | 2002 WC qualification |
| 2. | 10 August 2002 | Tabriz, Iran | Iran | 0-1 | 1–1 | Friendly |
| 3. | 21 August 2002 | Baku, Azerbaijan | Uzbekistan | 2–0 | 2–0 | Friendly |
| 4. | 11 June 2003 | Baku, Azerbaijan | Serbia and Montenegro | 2–1 | 2–1 | EC 2004 Qual |
| 5. | 6 September 2003 | Baku, Azerbaijan | Finland | 1–0 | 1–2 | EC 2004 Qual |
