= Zeynal Zeynalov (footballer) =

Azerbaijani footballer and futsal player (born 1979)

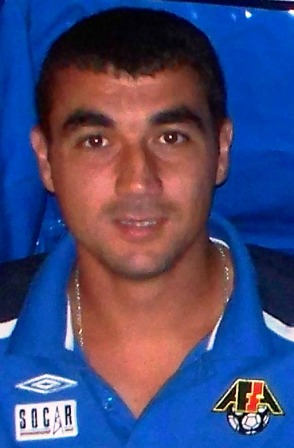

Personal information
- Date of birth: 6 December 1979 (age 46)
- Height: 1.82 m (5 ft 11 1/2 in)
- Position: Midfielder

Team information
- Current team: Standard Sumgayit
- Number: 14

Senior career*
Years	Team	Apps	(Gls)
2004–2007	FK MKT Araz	37	(3)
2007	Neftchi Baku PFC	1	(0)
2008	FK Karvan	10	(1)
2008	FK Mughan	8	(1)
2009–2010	Standard Sumgayit	21	(4)

International career
2003–2009	Azerbaijan	13	(1)
- Azerbaijan (futsal)
- * Club domestic league appearances and goals

Zeynal Zeynalov (born 6 December 1979) is an Azerbaijani professional footballer & futsal player. As of 2009, he plays for Standard Sumgayit.

== National team statistics ==
Azerbaijan national team
Year	Apps	Goals
2003	1	0
2008	8	1
2009	4	0
Total	13	1

=== International goals ===
#	Date	Venue	Opponent	Score	Result	Competition
1.	15 October 2008	Al Muharraq Stadium, Arad, Bahrain	Bahrain	1–2	Win	Friendly
Correct as of 7 October 2015
