= Sadıq Sadıqov =

Azerbaijani football executive (1965–2026)

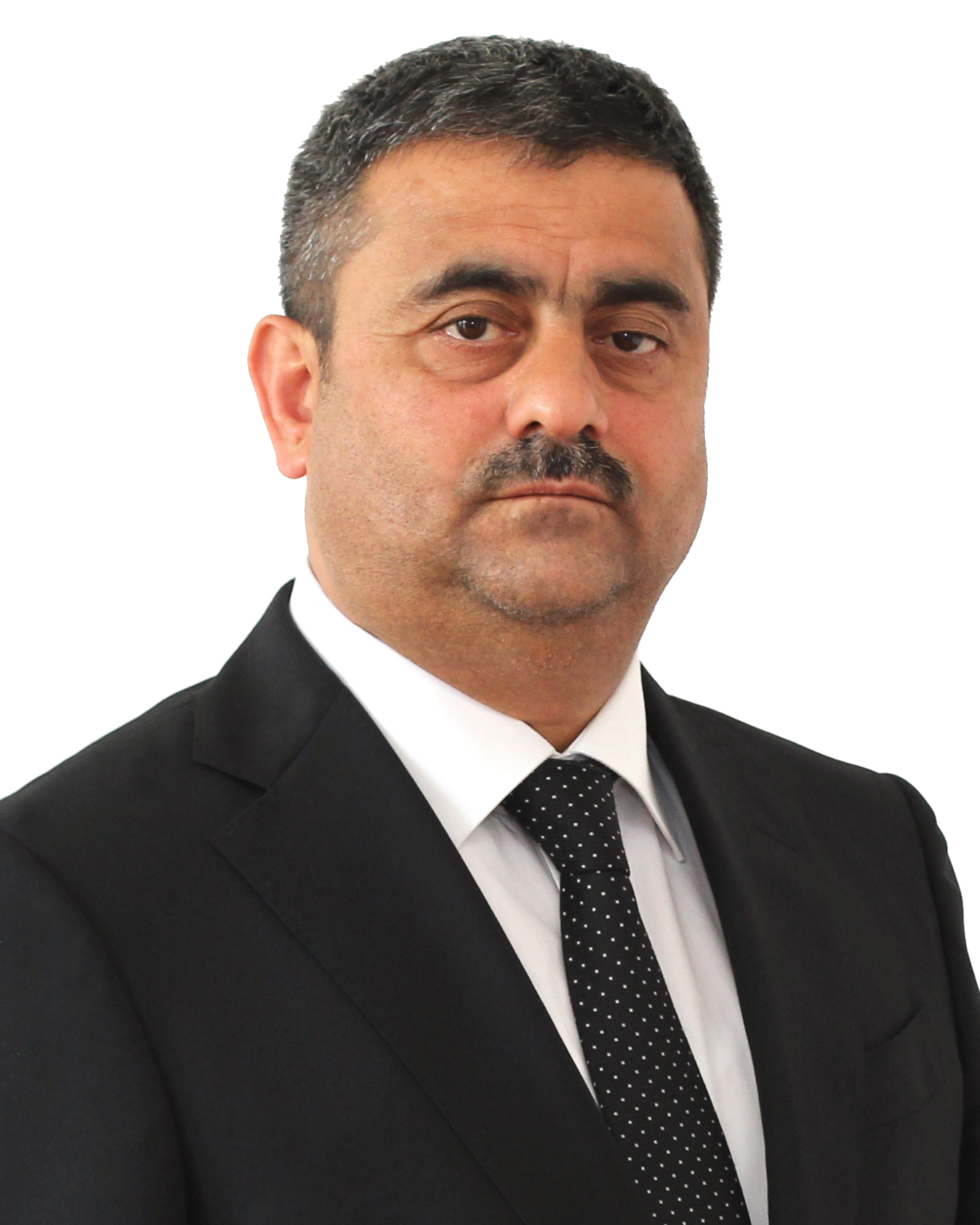
- Sadıqov in 2015
- Born: 9 November 1965; Naxçıvan, Nakhichevan ASSR, Azerbaijani SSR, Soviet Union
- Died: 5 June 2026 (aged 60)
- Education: Azerbaijan Polytechnic Institute

Sadıq Asəf oğlu Sadıqov (9 November 1965 – 5 June 2026) was an Azerbaijani football executive who was the President of the Neftchi Baku PFK from December 2009 to 2015.

== Life and career ==
In 1990, Sadıqov graduated Azerbaijan Polytechnic Institute named after Ch. Ildyryma, in mechanics department. He was executive director of the Sports Health Complex of Neftchi, Executive Member of the National Olympic Committee, Honorary Figure of Physical Culture and Sports. He was the president of the Neftchi from 2009 to 2015.

Sadiqov died on 5 June 2026, at the age of 60.
