= Nadir Nabiyev =

Azerbaijani footballer (born 1980)

Personal information
- Full name: Nadir Eldar oglu Nabiyev
- Date of birth: 18 July 1980 (age 46)
- Place of birth: Tovuz, Azerbaijan
- Height: 1.74 m (5 ft 9 in)
- Position: Striker

Senior career*
Years	Team	Apps	(Gls)
1995–2001	Turan Tovuz	117	(37)
2001–2004	Neftchi Baku	43	(16)
2004–2005	Turan Tovuz	30	(11)
2005–2008	Neftchi Baku	53	(21)
2008	Khazar Lankaran	6	(3)
2009	Standard Sumgayit	10	(0)
2009–2012	Turan Tovuz	57	(15)
Total		316	(103)

International career
2002–2006	Azerbaijan	27	(3)
- * Club domestic league appearances and goals

Nadir Nabiyev (Azerbaijani: Nadir Nəbiyev, born on 18 July 1980) is an Azerbaijani former professional footballer who played as a striker. He made 27 appearances for the Azerbaijan national team scoring three goals.

== Early life ==
Nabiyev was born in Tovuz, Azerbaijan.

== International career ==
Nabiyev earned 27 caps for Azerbaijan over the four-year he played for the national team, scoring 3 times. His debut came in July 2002 in a friendly against Estonia. His first two goals for Azerbaijan came on 14 December 2003 against the United Arab Emirates.

== Career statistics ==
=== Club ===
Club statistics
Season	Club	League	League		Cup		Other		Total	
Season	Club	League	App	Goals	App	Goals	App	Goals	App	Goals
Azerbaijan			League		Azerbaijan Cup		Europe		Total	
1995–96	Turan Tovuz	Azerbaijan Premier League	3	0			-		3	0
1996–97	Turan Tovuz	Azerbaijan Premier League	27	8			-		27	8
1997–98	Turan Tovuz	Azerbaijan Premier League	23	2			-		23	2
1998–99	Turan Tovuz	Azerbaijan Premier League	25	10			-		25	10
1999-2000	Turan Tovuz	Azerbaijan Premier League	21	8			-		21	8
2000–01	Turan Tovuz	Azerbaijan Premier League	18	9			-		18	9
2001–02	Neftchi Baku	Azerbaijan Premier League	22	5			2	0	24	5
2002–03	no league championship was held		-		-		-		-	
2003–04	Neftchi Baku	Azerbaijan Premier League	21	11			-		21	11
2004–05	Turan Tovuz	Azerbaijan Premier League	30	11			-		30	11
2005–06	Neftchi Baku	Azerbaijan Premier League	24	12			4	1	28	13
2006–07	Neftchi Baku	Azerbaijan Premier League	24	9			-		24	9
2007–08	Neftchi Baku	Azerbaijan Premier League	5	0			1	0	6	0
2007–08	Khazar Lankaran	Azerbaijan Premier League	6	3			-		6	3
2008–09	Standard Sumgayit	Azerbaijan Premier League	10	0			-		10	0
2008–09	Turan Tovuz	Azerbaijan Premier League	11	2			-		11	2
2009–10	Turan Tovuz	Azerbaijan Premier League	26	10			-		26	10
2011–12	Turan Tovuz	Azerbaijan Premier League	20	3			-		20	3
Total	Azerbaijan		316	103			7	1	323	104
Total			316	103			7	1	323	104

=== International ===
Azerbaijan national team
Year	Apps	Goals
2002	5	0
2003	3	2
2004	8	1
2005	8	0
2006	3	0
Total	27	3

#	Date	Venue	Opponent	Score	Result	Competition
1.	14 December 2003	Dubai, United Arab Emirates	United Arab Emirates	1–1	3-3	Friendly
2.	14 December 2003	Dubai, United Arab Emirates	United Arab Emirates	3–3	3-3	Friendly
3.	28 April 2004	Almaty, Kazakhstan	Kazakhstan	0–1	2-3	Friendly

== Honours ==
Neftchi Baku

- Azerbaijan Premier League: 2003–04.
- Azerbaijan Cup: 2001–02
- CIS Cup: 2006

Khazar Lankaran

- 2007–08
