= Branimir Subašić =

Azerbaijani footballer (born 1982)

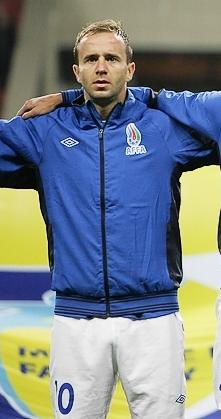
- With Azerbaijan in 2012

Personal information
- Full name: Branimir Subašić
- Date of birth: 7 April 1982 (age 44)
- Place of birth: Belgrade, SR Serbia, SFR Yugoslavia
- Height: 1.80 m (5 ft 11 in)
- Position: Forward

Youth career
- Železnik

Senior career*
Years	Team	Apps	(Gls)
1998–2002	Železnik	10	(0)
2002	→ Sremčica (loan)	6	(2)
2002–2003	Oostende	14	(3)
2003	Stade Beaucairois	4	(1)
2003–2005	Chornomorets Odesa	7	(1)
2005	→ Amkar Perm (loan)	6	(1)
2005–2008	Neftçi	65	(31)
2008–2010	Red Star Belgrade	11	(3)
2009	→ Changchun Yatai (loan)	24	(3)
2010–2011	Gabala	19	(2)
2011–2013	Khazar Lankaran	43	(9)
2013	Qarabağ	7	(0)
2013–2014	Orduspor	34	(8)
2014–2015	Manisaspor	30	(3)
2015–2017	OFK Beograd	19	(1)
2021–2022	KFK Ravna Gora	8	(4)
Total		307	(72)

International career
2007–2013	Azerbaijan	40	(7)
- * Club domestic league appearances and goals

Branimir Subašić (Serbian Cyrillic: Бранимир Субашић, Azerbaijani: Branimir Subaşiç; born 7 April 1982) is a retired footballer who played as a striker. Born in Serbia, he represented Azerbaijan at international level.

During his 18-year professional career, Subasic played for 15 clubs in 8 countries, mostly in Azerbaijan, Serbia and Turkey. Subasic played for the Azerbaijan national football team between 2007 and 2013, scoring 7 goals in 40 games. This makes him the fourth-highest-scoring player in the history of the national team.

== Club career ==
=== First years (1998–2005) ===
Subašić started his youth career in 1997 in Železnik when he was 15 years old. The next year in 1998 he signed a deal with this club and became a professional footballer. In 2003, he played in Stade Beaucairois for a half year. In 2003–04, he signed a 2-year deal with Chernomorets Odesa. In 2 seasons he played only 7 games and scored once. In 2005, he moved to Russian Premier League club Amkar Perm on loan where he played 6 games and scored one goal.

=== Neftçi (2005–2008) ===
In the summer of 2005 Subašić moved to Azerbaijan Premier League champion Neftçi. In his first appearance against Anderlecht in the UEFA Cup he gained a penalty and helped his team to have a victory with score 1–0. After that in January 2006 Neftçi played in the CIS Cup. In that year Neftçi won the trophy and Subašić scored 3 goals in the tournament.

In the next 3 years playing in Neftçi Subašić won the CIS Cup in 2006, won a silver medal in Azerbaijan Premier League in 2006–07 and a bronze medal in seasons 2005–06 and 2007–08. Overall, he had 65 matches and 31 goals. Also in 2007 he got Azerbaijan citizenship and started to play for the Azerbaijan national football team.

=== Red Star Belgrade (2008–2010) ===
In the summer of 2008, Subašić was transferred back to his native Serbia joining Belgrade club Red Star Belgrade. He played in 2008 in 11 games scoring 3 goals. In March 2009 Subašić moved to Chinese club Changchun Yatai on loan. In the Chinese Super League Subašić scored 3 goals in 24 games. Changchun Yatai took the silver medals in the 2009 Chinese Super League. After that he returned to Red Star Belgrade and ended the season in Serbia.

=== Return to Azerbaijan (2010–2013) ===
Subašić left Red Star Belgrade in May 2010 and moved to Azerbaijan. A few weeks after his arrival Tony Adams invited Subašić to his team. Subašić joined Gabala FC at the beginning of the 2010–11 Azerbaijan Premier League season. He played well in his opening match and was even called to the Azerbaijan national team, but he got an injury in November 2010 and missed a few matches for Gabala. When the second part of the Premier League began Subašić started to play as the attacking midfielder. Overall Subašić played 19 games in which he scored 2 goals and left Gabala in the end of the season because of the expired contract.

After leaving Gabala, Subašić moved to Khazar Lankaran at the beginning of the 2011–12 Azerbaijan Premier League season. In his opening match against Turan Tovuz Subašić scored two goals. On 23 December 2011, Subašić became the 5th foreign top goal scorer of the Azerbaijan Premier League with 38 goals. Overall Subašić played 30 matches in that season and scored 7 goals. Khazar Lankaran took the second place in 2011–12 Azerbaijan Premier League season. In the 2012–13 UEFA Europa League Khazar Lankaran played against JK Nõmme Kalju. Subašić scored in both matches (2–2; 0–2). Subašić also scored in a match against Lech Poznań at the second qualification stage match (1–1). However Khazar Lankaran lost the second match (0–1) and left the competition. Overall Subašić scored 3 goals in 4 matches in the Europe league. In the first match of the 2012–13 Azerbaijan Premier League against Ravan Baku Subašić scored again. He scored his second goal in the Azerbaijani Premier League in the 2012–13 season at 24 November 2012 against Kapaz. His third goal was in the match against AZAL. After that, Subašić became the 3rd most goal scoring foreign-born player of the Azerbaijan Premier League with 42 goals.

On 31 December 2012 Subašić's contract with Khazar Lankaran expired. On 11 January 2013, it was announced that Subašić was not going to get a new contract offer. Subašić left Khazar Lankaran with 14 goals scored in 51 caps.

Later on 21 January 2013 Subašić moved to Qarabağ until the end of the 2012–13 season. Subašić played only 8 matches because of a 2 month long injury. Qarabağ took second place in the 2012–13 Azerbaijan Premier League season and Bane left the team after the end of season.

=== Turkey career (2013–2015) ===
In June Subašić signed a 2-year deal with Turkish club Orduspor, playing in the TFF First League. He played in Orduspor with shirt number 20 for the 2013–14 season. Subašić debuted for Orduspor in the 1st week of the championship in a match against Adanaspor and played 90 minutes also in the 2nd match. He scored his first goal on 15 September in a match against Karşıyaka in the 3rd week; Orduspor won that match and it was the only goal in the game. Subašić became one of the main players of Orduspor and played in the centre forward position in the starting squad in almost all of the games. In the 2013–14 season Subašić made 30 appearances in PTT 1.Lig in which he scored 8 goals. In total he played 34 games in the season and scored 9 goals, thus became the 3rd most scoring player of the team. Orduspor took the 3rd place in PTT 1.Lig in 2013–14 season, however Orduspor lost its play-off matches and could not advance to Turkish Super League.

In July 2014, Subašić determined his contract with Orduspor and transferred to another Turkish club, Manisaspor. He played for Manisaspor in the PTT league in the 2014–15 season.

== International career ==
In 2007 during his time with Neftçi he gained citizenship and became a member of the Azerbaijan national football team after many Serbian coaches told him his chances of making the Serbian team were slim. He started his international career for Azerbaijan in March 2007 during Alma TV Cup. He scored his first international goal at his opening game with Uzbekistan. Until 29 June 2009, when he retired from international career he played 26 games for Azerbaijan and scored 6 goals becoming second most scoring player in Azerbaijan national football team after Qurban Qurbanov. In 2011 he returned to the Azerbaijan national football team.

=== International goals ===
Scores and results list Azerbaijan's goal tally first.

#	Date	Venue	Opponent	Score	Result	Competition
1.	7 March 2007	Kazhymukan Munaitpasov Stadium, Shymkent, Kazakhstan	Uzbekistan	1–0	1–0	Friendly
2.	2 June 2007	Tofiq Bahramov Republican Stadium, Baku, Azerbaijan	Poland	1–0	1–3	UEFA Euro 2008 qualifying
3.	22 August 2007	Pamir Stadium, Dushanbe, Tajikistan	Tajikistan	2–3	2–3	Friendly
4.	12 September 2007	Tofiq Bahramov Republican Stadium, Baku, Azerbaijan	Georgia	1–0	1–1	Friendly
5.	4 June 2008	Estadi Comunal d'Andorra la Vella, Andorra la Vella, Andorra	Andorra	2–0	2–1	Friendly
6.	19 November 2008	Tofiq Bahramov Republican Stadium, Baku, Azerbaijan	Albania	1–0	1–1	Friendly
7.	15 August 2012	Tofiq Bahramov Republican Stadium, Baku, Azerbaijan	Bahrain	1–0	3–0	Friendly

== Career statistics ==
=== Club ===
Club	Season	League		Cup		Continental		Other		Total	
Club	Season	Apps	Goals	Apps	Goals	Apps	Goals	Apps	Goals	Apps	Goals
Železnik	2001–02	3	0			—		—		3	0
Chornomorets Odesa	2003–04	7	1	2	0	—		—		9	1
Amkar Perm (loan)	2005	6	1	1	0	—		—		7	1
Neftçi	2005–06	24	11			2	0	—		26	11
Neftçi	2006–07	16	6			—		—		16	6
Neftçi	2007–08	25	14			2	1	—		27	15
Red Star Belgrade	2008–09	11	3	1	0	2	1	—		14	4
Red Star Belgrade	2009–10	0	0	0	0	0	0	—		0	0
Red Star Belgrade	2010–11	0	0	0	0	1	0	—		1	0
Changchun Yatai (loan)	2009	24	3	0	0	—		—		24	3
Gabala	2010–11	19	2	2	0	—		—		21	2
Khazar Lankaran	2011–12	27	6	3	1	0	0	—		30	7
Khazar Lankaran	2012–13	16	3	1	1	4	3	—		21	7
Qarabağ	2012–13	7	0	1	0	—		—		8	0
Orduspor	2013–14	30	8	2	0	—		2	0	34	8
Manisaspor	2014–15	30	3	8	2	—		—		38	5
OFK Beograd	2015–16	16	1	1	0	—		—		17	1
OFK Beograd	2016–17	3	0	0	0	—		—		3	0
Career total		264	62	22	4	11	5	2	0	299	71

=== International ===
Azerbaijan national team
Year	Apps	Goals
2007	13	4
2008	9	2
2009	4	0
2010	0	0
2011	4	0
2012	8	1
2013	2	0
Total	40	7

== Honours ==
Neftçi

- Commonwealth of Independent States Cup: 2006

Red Star Belgrade

- Serbian Cup: 2010

Individual

- Azerbaijani Footballer of the Year runner-up: 2007, 2008, 2012
- Azerbaijan Premier League best striker: 2007
