= Samir Aliyev =

Azerbaijani footballer (born 1979)

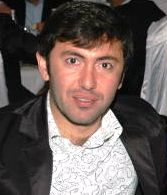

Personal information
- Full name: Samir Yagub oglu Aliyev
- Date of birth: 14 April 1979 (age 47)
- Place of birth: Kalinino, Armenian SSR, Soviet Union
- Height: 1.75 m (5 ft 9 in)
- Position: Forward

Senior career*
Years	Team	Apps	(Gls)
1997	Bakili Baku	1	(0)
1997–1998	MOIK Baku	18	(13)
1998–1999	Kapaz PFC	17	(5)
1999–2000	Neftchi Baku	18	(4)
2000–2001	Dynamo Baku	0	(0)
2001–2002	Neftchi Baku	37	(9)
2002–2004	Volyn Lutsk	33	(11)
2004	Uralan Elista	13	(4)
2004–2005	Khazar Lankaran	42	(24)
2005–2006	Inter Baku	21	(11)
2006–2010	Neftchi Baku	47	(8)
2010–2011	Simurq PFC	21	(3)
2011	Turan Tovuz	2	(0)

International career^{‡}
1997–2007	Azerbaijan	34	(4)

Managerial career
- 2015–2016: Neftchi Baku
- 2017–2018: Sabail
- 2019–2022: Azerbaijan U19
- 2022–2025: Azerbaijan U21
- * Club domestic league appearances and goals as of 20 March 2008 ‡ National team caps and goals as of 28 March 2008

Samir Aliyev (Azerbaijani: Samir Əliyev, born 14 April 1979) is a retired Azerbaijani footballer. Aliyev made 34 appearances for the Azerbaijan national football team, scoring four goals.

He has also been a former head coach of the national football team.

== National team statistics ==
Azerbaijan national team
Year	Apps	Goals
1997	1	0
2001	6	0
2002	10	1
2003	5	0
2004	5	0
2005	3	0
2007	4	3
Total	34	4

== International goals ==
#	Date	Venue	Opponent	Score	Result	Competition
1.	21 August 2002	Baku, Azerbaijan	Uzbekistan	1–0	2-0	Friendly
2.	22 August 2007	Dushambe, Tajikistan	Tajikistan	1-1	2-3	Friendly
3.	22 August 2007	Dushambe, Tajikistan	Tajikistan	1-2	2-3	Friendly
4.	17 October 2007	Baku, Azerbaijan	Serbia	1-2	1-6	EC 2008 Qual

== Honours ==
FC Kapaz

- Azerbaijan Premier League: 1998–99

=== Personal ===
- Azerbaijan Player of the Year: 2002
