= Zaur Tagizade =

Azerbaijani footballer (born 1979)

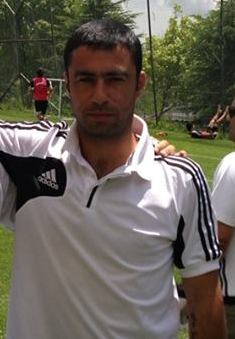

Personal information
- Full name: Zaur Qubad oğlu Tagizade
- Date of birth: 21 February 1979 (age 47)
- Place of birth: Baku, Soviet Union
- Height: 1.73 m (5 ft 8 in)
- Position: Winger

Senior career*
Years	Team	Apps	(Gls)
1994–1995	Kur Nur	10	(4)
1997	Lelle SK	6	(2)
1998	IA Akranes	3	(1)
1998–1999	Shafa Baku	16	(2)
1998–1999	Flora Tallinn	9	(4)
1999–2000	MOIK Baku	10	(1)
2000–2004	Shafa Baku	100	(17)
2004–2010	Neftchi Baku	132	(31)
Total		286	(61)

International career
1997–2007	Azerbaijan	40	(6)

Managerial career
- 2011–: Qarabağ (assistant)
- * Club domestic league appearances and goals

Zaur Qubad oglu Tagizade (Azerbaijani: Zaur Qubad oğlu Tağızadə; born 21 February 1979 in Baku, Soviet Union) is a retired Azerbaijani footballer. He has made 40 appearances for the Azerbaijan national football team.

== Early life ==
Tagizade began playing football in 1990 at the age of 11. His first coach was Neftchi Baku former defender Vyacheslav Semiglazov. During 1995–98 years he played for the Kur Nur, Estonian Lelle SK and Icelandic IA Akranes.

== Club career ==
He came back to Azerbaijan in 1998 and signed his first professional contract with Shafa Baku. At that time, he also played for Azerbaijan U17, Azerbaijan U19, Azerbaijan U21 and Azerbaijan national football team. After the short Flora Tallinn career he played for MOIK Baku, Shafa Baku and Neftchi Baku, won two times Azerbaijan Cup and Azerbaijan Premier League. He retired football in 2010 because of numerous injuries.

== International career ==
For Azerbaijan, Tagizade is capped 40 times, scoring 6 goal. He made his national team debut on 4 June 1997 against Estonia in friendly match. He scored his first goal on 5 June 1999 against Liechtenstein in a UEFA Euro 2000 qualifying.

== International goals ==
#	Date	Venue	Opponent	Score	Result	Competition
1	5 June 1999	Tofiq Bahramov Stadium, Baku,	Liechtenstein	3–0	4–0	Euro 2000 qualifying
2	18 August 1999	Samarkand Stadium, Samarkand,	Uzbekistan	3–1	5–1	Friendly
3	4 September 1999	Tofiq Bahramov Stadium, Baku,	Portugal	1–0	1–1	Euro 2000 qualifying
4	26 February 2001	National Sport Base, Varna,	Belarus	1–0	1–0	Friendly
5	6 June 2001	Tofiq Bahramov Stadium, Baku,	Slovakia	2–0	2–0	2002 World Cup qualification
6	17 August 2005	Qemal Stafa Stadium, Tirana,	Albania	0–1	2–1	Friendly

== Honors ==
Neftchi Baku

- Azerbaijan Premier League: 2003–04, 2004–05
- Azerbaijan Cup: 2000–01, 2003–04
- CIS Cup

Winners: 2006
Runners-up: 2005

=== Individual ===
- Azerbaijan Player of the Year: 2001
