= 2001–02 Azerbaijan Top League =

Annual soccer tournament

Azerbaijan Top League
- Season: 2001–02
- Champions: -
- Champions League: -
- UEFA Cup: -
- Top goalscorer: Kanan Karimov; Dmitri Kudinov (14)

The 2001–02 Azerbaijan Top League was contested by twelve clubs. In the 2nd round of the Championship, the championship was suspended due to the conflict between the clubs and the AFFA and clubs were not allowed to the European club tournaments.

The clubs, which had stopped racing, continued their championship with the initiative of the Organizing Committee. But that part of the history, like the "alternative championship," remained unofficially. Because AFFA, UEFA and FIFA did not recognize these results.

== First round ==
=== League table ===
Pos	Team	Pld	W	D	L	GF	GA	GD	Pts	Qualification
1	Shamkir	22	15	5	2	54	14	+40	50	Qualification for championship group
2	Shafa Baku	22	13	5	4	40	13	+27	44	Qualification for championship group
3	Neftçi Baku	22	13	5	4	34	7	+27	44	Qualification for championship group
4	Qarabağ	22	13	1	8	40	26	+14	40	Qualification for championship group
5	Ganja	22	12	2	8	39	31	+8	38	Qualification for championship group
6	Xazar Universitesi Baku	22	11	3	8	33	24	+9	36	Qualification for championship group
7	Turan	22	10	5	7	28	26	+2	35	Qualification for relegation group
8	Araz Naxçivan	22	6	6	10	25	43	−18	24	Qualification for relegation group
9	Tefekkur Universitesi Baku	22	6	4	12	23	47	−24	22	Qualification for relegation group
10	Sahdag Qusar	22	5	5	12	16	39	−23	20	Qualification for relegation group
11	MOIK Baku	22	4	3	15	15	37	−22	15	Qualification for relegation group
12	Dinamo Bakili Baku	22	0	4	18	9	49	−40	4	Qualification for relegation group

Source: Azerbaijan Professional Football league
Rules for classification: 1) points; 2) goal difference; 3) number of goals scored.

=== Results ===
Home \ Away	ARA	DBB	GAN	KHU	MOI	NEF	QAR	SHB	ŞAH	SHA	TUR	TUB
Araz Naxçıvan		2–0	2–0	1–0	1–0	0–0	3–2	0–3 (Note: Walkover.)	2–2	0–0	2–2	0–3
Dinamo Bakili Baku	2–4		2–3	0–3	1–2	0–0	0–3	0–1	0–0	0–3	1–1	1–2
Ganja	4–1	4–2		2–1	4–0	2–1	2–1	1–1	2–1	2–3	3–0	2–0
Xazar Universitesi Baku	3–0	2–0	2–0		2–0	0–2	1–2	0–0	2–0	3–2	3–2	3–1
MOIK Baku	4–3	2–0	1–1	1–1		0–1	0–1	0–0	1–2	0–1	0–1	2–3
Neftçi Baku	3–0	6–0	2–0	0–0	2–0		1–0	1–1	5–0	0–1	1–0	2–0
Qarabağ	3–0	1–0	3–2	1–2	2–0	1–0		2–1	6–0	1–3	5–2	0–1
Shafa Baku	4–1	0–0	3–1	2–0	1–0	0–1	2–1		3–0	3–2	5–0	4–0
Sahdag Qusar	1–1	1–0	0–1	1–3	2–0	0–1	0–2	1–0		1–1	1–2	0–0
Şəmkir	3–0	3–0	2–0	2–0	6–0	1–1	5–1	1–0	4–1		1–0	9–0
Turan	2–0	4–0	1–0	2–1	2–0	1–0	0–0	0–2	3–0	0–0		1–1
Tefekkur Universitesi Baku	2–2	2–0	2–3	3–1	0–2	0–4	1–2	1–4	0–2	1–1	0–2	

Source: APL: Yüksək dəstə - 2001-02
Legend: Blue = home team win; Yellow = draw; Red = away team win.

== Second round ==
=== Championship group ===
Pos	Team	Pld	W	D	L	GF	GA	GD	Pts
1	Shamkir	10	8	2	0	26	6	+20	26
2	Neftçi Baku	10	5	4	1	12	4	+8	19
3	Qarabağ	10	3	2	5	10	18	−8	11
4	Xazar Universitesi Baku	10	2	3	5	17	18	−1	9
5	Ganja	10	2	3	5	12	19	−7	9
6	Shafa Baku	10	1	2	7	1	19	−18	5

Source: Azerbaijan Professional Football league
Rules for classification: 1) points; 2) goal difference; 3) number of goals scored.

==== Results ====
Home \ Away	GAN	KHU	NEF	QAR	SHB	SHA
Ganja		2–2	1–3	3–0	3–0 (Note: Walkover.)	0–3
Xazar Universitesi Baku	5–1		0–1	1–1	3–0	2–4
Neftçi Baku	0–0	1–0		2–0	3–0	2–2
Qarabağ	3–3	3–3	1–0		– (Note: The match between Qarabağ and Shafa Baku was rated as a 3–0 defeat for both teams.)	0–2
Shafa Baku	0–0	1–0	0–0	0–3		0–3
Şəmkir	4–1	4–1	0–0	3–0	1–0	

Source: APL: Yüksək dəstə - 2001-02
Legend: Blue = home team win; Yellow = draw; Red = away team win.

=== Relegation group ===
Pos	Team	Pld	W	D	L	GF	GA	GD	Pts
7	MOIK Baku	8	6	1	1	15	6	+9	19
8	Sahdag Qusar	8	6	0	2	18	8	+10	18
9	Turan	8	4	2	2	12	9	+3	14
10	Tefekkur Universitesi Baku	8	2	1	5	9	18	−9	7
11	Dinamo Bakili Baku	8	0	0	8	8	21	−13	0
–	Araz Naxçivan (Note: Withdrew)	0	–	–	–	–	–	—	0

Source: Azerbaijan Professional Football league
Rules for classification: 1) points; 2) goal difference; 3) number of goals scored.

==== Results ====
Home \ Away	DBB	MOI	ŞAH	TUR	TUB
Dinamo Bakili Baku		1–2	2–3	0–1	0–3
MOIK Baku	2–0		3–2	3–1	2–1
Sahdag Qusar	3–0	1–0		1–0	1–0
Turan	3–2	0–0	3–2		4–1
Tefekkur Universitesi Baku	4–3	0–3	0–5	0–0	

Source: APL: Yüksək dəstə - 2001-02
Legend: Blue = home team win; Yellow = draw; Red = away team win.

== Season statistics ==
=== Top scorers ===
Rank	Player	Club	Goals
1	(Azerbaijan) Alay Bəhramov	Shamkir	15
2	(Azerbaijan) Kanan Karimov	Kapaz	14
3	(Russia) Dmitri Kudinov	Qarabağ	13
4	(Azerbaijan) Kamran Nurəhmədov	Shahdag	9
4	(Azerbaijan) Zaur Tagizade	Shafa	9
4	(Azerbaijan) Vidadi Rzayev	Qarabağ / Shamkir	9
7	(Azerbaijan) İmamyar Süleymanov	Turan Tovuz / Araz	8
8	(Azerbaijan) Gurban Gurbanov	Neftchi	7
8	(Azerbaijan) Mahir Əliyev	Hazar Universiteti Baki / Təfəkkür Universiteti	7
8	(Azerbaijan) Elmir Xankişiyev	Qarabağ	6
