= 2008–09 Budapest Honvéd FC season =

Budapest Honvéd
2008–09 season
- Chairman: George Hemingway
- Manager: Gábor Pölöskei (until 23 February); Tibor Sisa (from 25 February)
- Stadium: Bozsik Stadion
- Nemzeti Bajnokság I: 13th
- Magyar Kupa: Winners
- Ligakupa: Semi-finals
- UEFA Intertoto Cup: Third round
- Top goalscorer: League: Zoltán Hercegfalvi (14); All: Zoltán Hercegfalvi (21)
- Highest home attendance: 7,000 vs Győr (26 May 2009); Magyar Kupa
- Lowest home attendance: 200 vs Rákospalota (29 October 2008); Ligakupa
- Average home league attendance: 1,786
- Biggest win: 8–1 vs Rákospalota (H) (29 October 2008); Ligakupa
- Biggest defeat: 1–4 vs Győr (A) (31 August 2008); Nemzeti Bajnokság I 0–3 vs Nyíregyháza (A) (20 September 2008); Nemzeti Bajnokság I 1–4 vs Debrecen (A) (24 October 2008); Nemzeti Bajnokság I 0–3 vs Újpest (A) (24 April 2009); Nemzeti Bajnokság I 0–3 vs MTK Budapest (H) (5 May 2009); Nemzeti Bajnokság I

The 2008–09 season was Budapest Honvéd Football Club's 98th competitive season, 4th consecutive season in the Nemzeti Bajnokság I and 99th year in existence as a football club. In addition to the domestic league, Budapest Honvéd participated in this season's editions of the Magyar Kupa, Ligakupa, and UEFA Intertoto Cup. The season covered the period from 25 July 2008 to 30 May 2009.

== First team squad ==
Note: Flags indicate national team as defined under FIFA eligibility rules; some limited exceptions apply. Players may hold more than one non-FIFA nationality.

No.	Pos.	Nation	Player
1	GK	HUN	Iván Tóth
2	DF	HUN	Géza Fazakas
3	FW	HUN	Norbert Palásthy
4	DF	SRB	Mićo Smiljanić
5	DF	CIV	Benjamin Angoua
6	DF	HUN	Tamás Filó
7	FW	HUN	Roland Vólent
8	FW	SRB	Nemanja Arsenijević
9	MF	HUN	Attila Dobos
14	DF	HUN	András Debreceni
16	DF	CRO	Davor Magoč
17	MF	SEN	Abass Cheikh Dieng
18	FW	CIV	Abraham Gneki Guié
19	MF	BRA	Diego Rigonato

No.	Pos.	Nation	Player
21	FW	HUN	Zoltán Hercegfalvi (captain)
22	MF	SRB	Nenad Stojaković
23	DF	HUN	Zoltán Vincze
24	MF	HUN	László Horváth
25	DF	MNE	Marko Simić
26	MF	HUN	Patrik Hidi
27	MF	BRA	Guilherme Moreira
28	MF	HUN	Béla Maróti
29	DF	HUN	Ákos Takács
30	DF	ZAM	Misheck Lungu
55	DF	SRB	Dragan Vukmir
79	MF	MOZ	Genito
99	GK	HUN	Balázs Rabóczki

== Transfers ==
=== Summer ===
In: Note: Flags indicate national team as defined under FIFA eligibility rules; some limited exceptions apply. Players may hold more than one non-FIFA nationality.

No.	Pos.	Nation	Player
8	FW	SRB	Nemanja Arsenijević (from (Serbia) OFK Beograd)
16	DF	CRO	Davor Magoč (from (Serbia) Čelarevo)
22	MF	SRB	Nenad Stojaković (from (Serbia) Rad)
25	DF	SRB	Marko Simić (from (Serbia) Radnički)
27	MF	BRA	Guilherme Moreira (from (Brazil) Coritiba)
28	MF	HUN	Béla Maróti (from Kaposvár)
99	GK	HUN	Balázs Rabóczki (from (Netherlands) Vitesse)

Out: Note: Flags indicate national team as defined under FIFA eligibility rules; some limited exceptions apply. Players may hold more than one non-FIFA nationality.

No.	Pos.	Nation	Player
4	MF	GER	Yusuf Adewunmi (to (Germany) Oberneuland)
6	DF	HUN	Tibor Pomper (End of contract)
8	GK	GER	Pascal Borel (End of contract)
8	FW	HUN	László Bojtor (loan to Siófok)
14	MF	HUN	Gábor Vincze (to Biatorbágy)
22	MF	HUN	Zsolt Bárányos (to Nyíregyháza)
25	FW	CMR	Edouard Ndjodo (loan to Siófok)
27	FW	HUN	Gábor Koós (loan to Siófok)
28	MF	GER	Esad Veledar (to (Slovakia) DAC Dunajská Streda)
31	MF	HUN	Balázs Berdó (to Pécs)

=== Winter ===
In: Note: Flags indicate national team as defined under FIFA eligibility rules; some limited exceptions apply. Players may hold more than one non-FIFA nationality.

No.	Pos.	Nation	Player
2	DF	HUN	Géza Fazakas (from Budapest Honvéd II)
30	DF	ZAM	Misheck Lungu (from Kecskemét)
55	DF	SRB	Dragan Vukmir (from (China) Dalian Shide)
70	MF	MEX	José Manuel Rivera (loan return from (Mexico) Deportivo Toluca)

Out: Note: Flags indicate national team as defined under FIFA eligibility rules; some limited exceptions apply. Players may hold more than one non-FIFA nationality.

No.	Pos.	Nation	Player
7	MF	HUN	Gellért Ivancsics (loan to Siófok)
11	FW	HUN	Róbert Zsolnai (loan to Kaposvár)
79	DF	LBR	George Gebro (End of contract)

== Competitions ==
=== Overview ===
Competition	First match	Last match	Starting round	Final position	Record							
Competition	First match	Last match	Starting round	Final position	Pld	W	D	L	GF	GA	GD	Win %
Nemzeti Bajnokság I	29 July 2008	30 May 2009	Matchday 1	13th	30	8	8	14	31	46	−15	26.67
Magyar Kupa	3 September 2008	26 May 2009	Round of 64	Winners	10	8	2	0	19	6	+13	80.00
Ligakupa	1 October 2008	9 April 2009	Group stage	Semi-finals	14	6	5	3	38	19	+19	42.86
UEFA Intertoto Cup	22 June 2008	26 July 2008	First round	Third round	6	3	1	2	10	8	+2	50.00
Total					60	25	16	19	98	79	+19	41.67

Source: Competitions

=== Nemzeti Bajnokság I ===
==== League table ====
Pos	Team	Pld	W	D	L	GF	GA	GD	Pts	Qualification or relegation
11	Paks	30	9	8	13	38	51	−13	35	
12	Diósgyőr	30	9	6	15	29	45	−16	33	
13	Budapest Honvéd	30	8	8	14	31	46	−15	32	Qualification for Europa League third qualifying round (Note: Budapest Honvéd won the 2008–09 Hungarian Cup and thereby qualified for the third qualifying round of the UEFA Europa League.)
14	Nyíregyháza	30	7	11	12	32	41	−9	32	
15	Siófok (R)	30	8	2	20	30	56	−26	26	Relegation to Nemzeti Bajnokság II

Source: soccerway.com
Rules for classification: 1st points; 2nd overall wins; 3rd goal difference; 4th goals scored
(R) Relegated

==== Results summary ====
Overall								Home						Away					
Pld	W	D	L	GF	GA	GD	Pts	W	D	L	GF	GA	GD	W	D	L	GF	GA	GD
30	8	8	14	31	46	−15	32	5	4	6	15	17	−2	3	4	8	16	29	−13

Source: Hungarian Football Federation

==== Results by round ====
Round	1	2	3	4	5	6	7	8	9	10	11	12	13	14	15	16	17	18	19	20	21	22	23	24	25	26	27	28	29	30
Ground	H	A	H	A	H	A	H	A	H	A	H	A	H	A	H	A	H	A	H	A	H	A	H	A	H	A	H	A	H	A
Result	L	D	W	D	W	L	L	L	D	W	L	L	D	W	W	L	L	D	D	D	D	W	W	L	L	L	L	L	W	L
Position	13	13	9	9	6	10	11	13	13	11	12	12	13	13	11	13	14	14	14	14	14	14	12	12	12	12	13	13	13	13

Source: Matches
A = Away; H = Home; W = Win; D = Draw; L = Loss

==== Matches ====
29 July 2008 1	Budapest Honvéd	0–1	Vasas	Budapest
20:00 CEST (UTC+2)	Smiljanić (yellow card) 29'	Report	Dobrić (yellow card) 47'; Paripovic (yellow card) 67'; Lázok 81'; Tóth (red card) 86'	Stadium: Bozsik Stadion; Attendance: 2,000; Referee: Mihály Fábián

3 August 2008 2	MTK Budapest	1–1	Budapest Honvéd	Budapest
20:00 CEST (UTC+2)	Pál 33'; Pintér (yellow card) 63'	Report	Hercegfalvi 23'; Smiljanić (yellow card) 33'; Gebro (yellow card) 45'; Genito (yellow card) 89'	Stadium: Hidegkuti Nándor Stadion; Attendance: 1,500; Referee: István Mészáros

8 August 2008 3	Budapest Honvéd	3–1	DVTK	Budapest
19:00 CEST (UTC+2)	Hercegfalvi 24', 60', 90+2'; Ivancsics (yellow card) 60'; Gebro (yellow card) 85'	Report	Kamber (yellow card) 23'; Miličić (yellow card) 30'; Tóth 54'; Sebők (red card) 63'; Köteles (yellow card) 90+2'	Stadium: Bozsik Stadion; Attendance: 3,000; Referee: István Vad

16 August 2008 4	Paks	1–1	Budapest Honvéd	Paks
19:00 CEST (UTC+2)	Sipeki (yellow card) 20'; Tököli 28' (pen.); Böde (yellow card) 52'; Vári (yellow card) 84'	Report	Rigonato (yellow card) 34'; Vincze (yellow card) 59'; Ivancsics (yellow card) 70'; Hercegfalvi 73' (pen.)	Stadium: Fehérvári úti Stadion; Attendance: 3,927; Referee: Tamás Arany

24 August 2008 5	Budapest Honvéd	3–1	Zalaegerszeg	Budapest
20:00 CEST (UTC+2)	Rigonato 22'; Dieng 29', 42'	Report	Miljatovič 7'; Davidov (yellow card) 60'	Stadium: Bozsik Stadion; Attendance: 1,500; Referee: Zoltán Iványi

31 August 2008 6	Győr	4–1	Budapest Honvéd	Győr
17:30 CEST (UTC+2)	Koltai 11', (yellow card) 38'; Bajzát 34', 76', 81'; Kovács (yellow card) 43'; Tokody (yellow card) 58'; Copa (yellow card) 83'	Report	Smiljanić 8'; Hercegfalvi (yellow card) 43'; Maróti (yellow card) 83'	Stadium: ETO Park; Attendance: 3,000; Referee: Mihály Fábián

13 September 2008 7	Budapest Honvéd	1–2	Fehérvár	Budapest
20:00 CEST (UTC+2)	Maróti 33', (yellow card) 69'; Magoč (yellow card) 40'; Hercegfalvi (yellow card) 53'; Dieng (yellow card) 62'; Smiljanić (yellow card) 90'	Report	Anđić (yellow card) 25'; Farkas 37'; Sitku 75'; Nagy (yellow card) 82'; Romero (yellow card) 89'	Stadium: Bozsik Stadion; Attendance: 1,500; Referee: Viktor Kassai

20 September 2008 8	Nyíregyháza	3–0	Budapest Honvéd	Nyíregyháza
19:00 CEST (UTC+2)	Apostu 36', 63'; Ramos 56'	Report		Stadium: Városi Stadion; Attendance: 2,000; Referee: Tamás Arany

27 September 2008 9	Budapest Honvéd	1–1	Újpest	Budapest
15:00 CEST (UTC+2)	Guié 11'; Smiljanić (yellow card) 23'	Report	Kiss (yellow card) 17'; Lipták (yellow card) 26'; Maróti 41' (o.g.)	Stadium: Bozsik Stadion; Attendance: 3,000; Referee: István Mészáros

3 October 2008 10	Siófok	0–1	Budapest Honvéd	Siófok
19:00 CEST (UTC+2)	Tusori (yellow card) 69'	Report	Guié 37'; Filó (yellow card) 70'	Stadium: Révész Street Stadium; Attendance: 1,200; Referee: Tamás Bognár

18 October 2008 11	Budapest Honvéd	0–1	Haladás	Budapest
15:00 CEST (UTC+2)	Genito (yellow card) 44'	Report	Sipos 63'	Stadium: Bozsik Stadion; Attendance: 1,500; Referee: József Berger

24 October 2008 12	Debrecen	4–1	Budapest Honvéd	Debrecen
19:00 CEST (UTC+2)	Rudolf 2'; Oláh 41'; Szakály 58', 61'	Report	Maróti (yellow card) 13'; Angoua (yellow card) 25'; Genito (yellow card) 40'; Moreira 59'; Vincze (yellow card) 75'	Stadium: Stadion Oláh Gábor Út; Attendance: 4,000; Referee: Zoltán Iványi

1 November 2008 13	Budapest Honvéd	2–2	Kecskemét	Budapest
18:00 CET (UTC+1)	Rigonato 48'; Vincze (yellow card) 54'; Hercegfalvi 60'; Genito (yellow card) 61'; Filó (yellow card) 87'	Report	Koszó (yellow card) 3'; Csordás 32', 90+2'; Farkas (yellow card) 38'; Gyagya (yellow card) 87'	Stadium: Bozsik Stadion; Attendance: 1,000; Referee: Zsolt Szabó

8 November 2008 14	Rákospalota	2–5	Budapest Honvéd	Budapest
18:00 CET (UTC+1)	Kőhalmi (yellow card) 22'; Dancs 28'; Lisztes 77'	Report	Hercegfalvi 15' (pen.), 75'; Rigonato 41'; Genito 57'; Stojaković 82'	Stadium: Stadion Budai II. Laszló; Attendance: 800; Referee: Péter Solymosi

15 November 2008 15	Budapest Honvéd	2–1	Kaposvár	Budapest
18:00 CET (UTC+1)	Hercegfalvi 36'; Rigonato 38'	Report	Petrók (yellow card) 36'; Pest (yellow card) 42'; Nikolić 90+3' (pen.)	Stadium: Bozsik Stadion; Attendance: 1,200; Referee: István Mészáros

21 February 2009 16	Vasas	3–1	Budapest Honvéd	Budapest
15:00 CET (UTC+1)	A. Tóth 5'; Németh 34', (yellow card) 90'; B. Tóth 41'; Dobrić (yellow card) 80'; Piller (red card) 88'	Report	Takács (yellow card) 20'; Lungu (yellow card) 25'; Hercegfalvi 60'	Stadium: Stadion Rudolf Illovszky; Attendance: 2,000; Referee: István Vad

5 May 2009 17	Budapest Honvéd	0–3	MTK Budapest	Budapest
19:00 CEST (UTC+2)	Debreceni (yellow card) 17'; Filó (yellow card) 58'; Fazakas (yellow card) 69'	Report	Lencse (yellow card) 16'; Urbán 77', 90+4'; Hrepka 82'	Stadium: Bozsik Stadion; Attendance: 1,100; Referee: István Vad

7 March 2009 18	DVTK	0–0	Budapest Honvéd	Miskolc
18:00 CET (UTC+1)		Report	Filó (red card) 55'; Lungu (red card) 90'	Stadium: Diósgyőri Stadion; Attendance: 5,500; Referee: József Berger

14 March 2009 19	Budapest Honvéd	1–1	Paks	Budapest
18:00 CET (UTC+1)	Arsenijević (yellow card) 41'; Hidi 64', (yellow card) 80'; Dobos (yellow card) 88'	Report	Szabó (yellow card) 30'; Nikolov (yellow card) 32'; Tököli 90+2'	Stadium: Bozsik Stadion; Attendance: 2,000; Referee: Péter Solymosi

21 March 2009 20	Zalaegerszeg	1–1	Budapest Honvéd	Zalaegerszeg
15:00 CET (UTC+1)	Varga (yellow card) 56'; Miljatovič (yellow card) 62'; Hajdú 87'	Report	Dieng (yellow card) 45'; Hercegfalvi 76'; Simić (yellow card) 78'	Stadium: ZTE Arena; Attendance: 2,953; Referee: Ferenc Bede

3 April 2009 21	Budapest Honvéd	0–0	Győr	Budapest
19:00 CEST (UTC+2)	Dobos (yellow card) 49'; Fazakas (red card) 78'	Report	Stark (yellow card) 76'	Stadium: Bozsik Stadion; Attendance: 2,500; Referee: Mihály Fábián

11 April 2009 22	Fehérvár	0–2	Budapest Honvéd	Székesfehérvár
19:00 CEST (UTC+2)	Anđić (yellow card) 26'; Koller (red card) 37'; Vujović (yellow card) 66'; Horváth (red card) 90+3'	Report	Arsenijević (yellow card) 34'; Hercegfalvi 38' (pen.), 45'; Rigonato (yellow card) 56'; Dieng (yellow card) 69'	Stadium: Sóstói Stadion; Attendance: 1,857; Referee: Tamás Bognár

18 April 2009 23	Budapest Honvéd	1–0	Nyíregyháza	Budapest
19:00 CEST (UTC+2)	Angoua (yellow card) 55'; Guié 58'; Stojaković (yellow card) 84'	Report	Ramos (yellow card) 23'; Imedashvili (yellow card) 27'; Odrobéna (yellow card) 57'; Perenyi (yellow card) 72'; Mboussi (yellow card) 75'; Dosso (yellow card) 76'	Stadium: Bozsik Stadion; Attendance: 2,000; Referee: Roland Veizer

24 April 2009 24	Újpest	3–0	Budapest Honvéd	Budapest
19:00 CEST (UTC+2)	Kabát 12', 86'; Pollák (red card) 38'; Tisza (yellow card) 43'; Malone 49', (yellow card) 50'	Report	Debreceni (yellow card) 26'; Angoua (red card) 69'	Stadium: Szusza Ferenc Stadium; Attendance: 8,196; Referee: Mihály Fábián

28 April 2009 25	Budapest Honvéd	0–2	Siófok	Budapest
19:00 CEST (UTC+2)	Rabóczki (yellow card) 50'; Vukmir (yellow card) 73'	Report	Ivancsics 52' (pen.); Magasföldi 75'	Stadium: Bozsik Stadion; Attendance: 1,000; Referee: Ádám Németh

1 May 2009 26	Haladás	1–0	Budapest Honvéd	Szombathely
19:00 CEST (UTC+2)	Kenesei 40'; Vörös (yellow card) 80'	Report	Debreceni (yellow card) 37'; Vólent (yellow card) 76'; Vukmir (yellow card) 77'	Stadium: Rohonci Street Stadium; Attendance: 6,500; Referee: Viktor Kassai

9 May 2009 27	Budapest Honvéd	0–1	Debrecen	Budapest
15:00 CEST (UTC+2)	Takács (yellow card) 6'; Maróti (yellow card) 90+2'	Report	Szakály (yellow card) 55', (goal) 59'; Rudolf (yellow card) 85'; Nagy (yellow card) 90'	Stadium: Bozsik Stadion; Attendance: 2,500; Referee: József Berger

16 May 2009 28	Kecskemét	3–1	Budapest Honvéd	Kecskemét
19:00 CEST (UTC+2)	Farkas (yellow card) 29'; Litsingi 58'; Gyagya (yellow card) 64'; Montvai 65', 90+2', (yellow card) 90+2'	Report	Guié 26'; Genito (yellow card) 37'; Lungu (yellow card) 42'; Debreceni (yellow card) 57'	Stadium: Széktói Stadion; Attendance: 3,500; Referee: Tamás Bognár

23 May 2009 29	Budapest Honvéd	1–0	Rákospalota	Budapest
19:00 CEST (UTC+2)	Hercegfalvi 21'; Debreceni (yellow card) 74'; Dobos (yellow card) 90+1'	Report	Sallai (yellow card) 30'; Pintér (yellow card) 39'; Varga (yellow card) 59'	Stadium: Bozsik Stadion; Attendance: 1,000; Referee: Szabolcs Szilasi

30 May 2009 30	Kaposvár	3–1	Budapest Honvéd	Kaposvár
19:00 CEST (UTC+2)	Kovácsevics 11'; Nikolić 23', 83'	Report	Moreira 79'	Stadium: Rákóczi Stadion; Attendance: 1,500; Referee: Tamás Bognár

=== Magyar Kupa ===
3 September 2008 Round of 64	Tura	1–2 (a.e.t.)	Budapest Honvéd	Tura
16:30 CEST (UTC+2)	Aranyos 38'	Report	Filó 41'; Zsolnai 118'	Stadium: Turai sportpálya Attendance: 500; Referee: A. Hegedűs

24 September 2008 Round of 32	Debrecen VSC II	0–1	Budapest Honvéd	Debrecen
15:30 CEST (UTC+2)	Ludánszki (yellow card) 17'; Rezes (yellow card) 64'	Report	Rigonato (yellow card) 22'; Smiljanić (yellow card) 41'; Guié 67'; Horváth (red card) 83'	Referee: János Takács

Round of 16

8 October 2008 First leg	Makó	0–2	Budapest Honvéd	Makó
15:00 CEST (UTC+2)	Csamangó (red card) 34'; Maróti (yellow card) 40'	Report	Stojaković 20'; Guié 75'	Stadium: Stadium Erdei Ferenc tér Referee: Mihály Fábián

21 October 2008 Second leg	Budapest Honvéd	3–1 (5–1 agg.)	Makó	Budapest
18:00 CEST (UTC+2)	Moreira 38'; Smiljanić 55'; Dieng 63'	Report	Podonyi (yellow card) 55'; Molnár 86'	Stadium: Bozsik Stadion; Attendance: 500; Referee: Gyöngyi Gaál
Note: Budapest Honvéd won 5-1 on aggregate.

Quarter-finals

11 March 2009 First leg	Budapest Honvéd	2–0	Kecskemét	Budapest
18:00 CET (UTC+1)	Moreira 36', 54'; Filó (yellow card) 83'; Angoua (yellow card) 87'	Report	Čukić (yellow card) 3'; Farkas (yellow card) 41'; Schindler (yellow card) 63'	Stadium: Bozsik Stadion; Attendance: 1,000; Referee: Zoltán Iványi

18 March 2009 Second leg	Kecskemét	1–4 (1–6 agg.)	Budapest Honvéd	Kecskemét
19:00 CET (UTC+1)	Montvai 16'; Kormos (yellow card) 23'; Koncz (yellow card) 44'; Némedi (yellow card) 51'; Čukić (yellow card) 58'	Report	Dieng 4', 44'; Takács (yellow card) 21'; Guié 33'; Filó (yellow card) 59'; Arsenijević 90+1'	Stadium: Széktói Stadion; Attendance: 1,000; Referee: István Vad
Note: Budapest Honvéd won 6-1 on aggregate.

Semi-finals

15 April 2009 First leg	Siófok	1–2	Budapest Honvéd	Siófok
18:00 CEST (UTC+2)	Hercegfalvi 6' (o.g.); Hegedűs (yellow card) 33'; Horváth (yellow card) 67'; Magasföldi (yellow card) 77'; Andruskó (yellow card) 90+2'; Sütő (yellow card) 90+2'	Report	Smiljanić (yellow card) 1'; Filó (yellow card) 7'; Vukmir (yellow card) 47'; Lungu (yellow card) 51'; Moreira 75'; Guié 78'	Stadium: Révész Street Stadium; Attendance: 1,000; Referee: Sándor Andó-Szabó

21 April 2009 Second leg	Budapest Honvéd	2–2 (4–3 agg.)	Siófok	Budapest
18:00 CEST (UTC+2)	Filó (yellow card) 22'; Smiljanić 43'; Debreceni (yellow card) 67'; Hercegfalvi 90+1'	Report	Horváth (yellow card) 17'; Sütő (yellow card) 28'; Hegedűs 49', (yellow card) 53'; Ivancsics 74'; Nagy (red card) 83'	Stadium: Bozsik Stadion; Attendance: 2,000; Referee: Ferenc Bede
Note: Budapest Honvéd won 4-3 on aggregate.

Final

20 May 2009 First leg	Győr	0–1	Budapest Honvéd	Győr
18:00 CEST (UTC+2)	Aleksidze (yellow card) 17'; Böőr (yellow card) 20'; Odikadze (yellow card) 47'; Bajzát (yellow card) 67'; Stevanović (yellow card) 90+3'	Report	Smiljanić (yellow card) 20'; Guié 71'; Filó (yellow card) 78'; Maróti (yellow card) 88'	Stadium: ETO Park; Attendance: 11,000; Referee: Szabó

26 May 2009 Second leg	Budapest Honvéd	0–0 (1–0 agg.)	Győr	Budapest
19:00 CEST (UTC+2)	Hercegfalvi (yellow card) 29'; Smiljanić (yellow card) 48'; Angoua (red card) 83'	Report	Stanišić (yellow card) 30'; Böőr (yellow card) 39'; Šupić (red card) 63'; Stark (yellow card) 86'; Copa (yellow card) 90+2'	Stadium: Bozsik Stadion; Attendance: 7,000; Referee: Péter Solymosi
Note: Budapest Honvéd won the cup 1-0 on aggregate.

=== Ligakupa ===
==== Group stage ====
Pos	Team	Pld	W	D	L	GF	GA	GD	Pts	Qualification	FEH	HON	FER	KEC	RAK	BAK
1	Fehérvár	10	7	3	0	29	9	+20	24	Advance to knockout phase	—	2–2	0–0	2–0	4–0	8–0
2	Honvéd	10	5	4	1	33	16	+17	19	Advance to knockout phase	1–1	—	2–2	5–3	8–1	5–1
3	Ferencváros	10	5	4	1	20	10	+10	19		2–3	2–2	—	2–1	3–0	3–0
4	Kecskemét	10	3	2	5	22	17	+5	11		2–3	2–3	0–0	—	2–2	4–0
5	Rákospalota	10	3	1	6	14	28	−14	10		2–4	1–0	2–3	0–3	—	4–1
6	Baktalórántháza	10	0	0	10	3	41	−38	0		0–2	1–5	0–3	0–5	0–2	—

Source: HFF

1 October 2008 1	Kecskemét	2–3	Budapest Honvéd	Kecskemét
17:00 CEST (UTC+2)	Balázs (yellow card) 8'; Savić 11'; Alempijević (yellow card) 18'; Menyhárt (yellow card) 36'; Kormos 69'; Sándor (red card) 80'	Report	Stojaković 10', (yellow card) 32'; Dobos 37'; Arsenijević 61'; Albarracín (red card) 75'; Fazakas (yellow card) 85'	Stadium: Széktói Stadion; Attendance: 600; Referee: Gábor Péter Kovács

15 October 2008 2	Budapest Honvéd	2–2	Ferencváros	Budapest
17:30 CEST (UTC+2)	Angoua (yellow card) 7'; Hercegfalvi 24'; Ivancsics (yellow card) 87'; Moreira 90+2'	Report	Downing 18'; Bartholomew 74'	Stadium: Bozsik Stadion; Attendance: 1,000; Referee: Tamás Arany

29 October 2008 3	Budapest Honvéd	8–1	Rákospalota	Budapest
18:00 CET (UTC+1)	Kocsis 4', 45'; Gebro 25'; Simić 30'; Arsenijević 56', 86'; Rigonato 63', 90'	Report	Lisztes 3'; Kovács (yellow card) 57'	Stadium: Bozsik Stadion; Attendance: 200; Referee: László Varga

5 November 2008 4	Fehérvár	2–2	Budapest Honvéd	Székesfehérvár
17:00 CET (UTC+1)	Mohl 26'; Kulcsár (yellow card) 40'; Denysov (yellow card) 63'; Disztl 79'	Report	Dieng 67'; Arsenijević 71'	Stadium: Sóstói Stadion; Attendance: 150; Referee: János Takács

11 November 2008 5	Baktalórántháza	1–5	Budapest Honvéd	Baktalórántháza
13:30 CET (UTC+1)	Illés 13', (yellow card) 69'; Szilágyi (yellow card) 40'; Tolnai (yellow card) 83'; Vágó (red card) 84'	Report	Arsenijević 7', 33'; Dieng 20'; Ivancsics 39', 60'; Debreceni (yellow card) 56'; Kocsis (red card) 84'	Stadium: Városi Stadion; Attendance: 100; Referee: Zoltán Iványi

22 November 2008 6	Budapest Honvéd	5–3	Kecskemét	Budapest
17:00 CET (UTC+1)	Stojaković 11'; Maróti (yellow card) 46'; Hercegfalvi 49', 68', 82'; Filó 84'	Report	Čukić (yellow card) 42'; Hegedűs 57'; Kormos 65', 67'	Stadium: Bozsik Stadion; Attendance: 200; Referee: Tamás Bognár

30 November 2008 7	Ferencváros	2–2	Budapest Honvéd	Budapest
17:30 CET (UTC+1)	Deme 24'; Országh (yellow card) 36'; Kamaté 59', (yellow card) 69'	Report	Moreira 6'; Diego 33'; Takács (red card) 65'	Stadium: Stadion Albert Flórián; Attendance: 500; Referee: Zsolt Szabó

6 December 2008 8	Rákospalota	1–0	Budapest Honvéd	Budapest
13:00 CET (UTC+1)	Kovács (yellow card) 48'; Erős (yellow card) 58'; Kapcsos 65'	Report	Tóth (yellow card) 15'; Debreceni (yellow card) 45'; Hercegfalvi (red card) 78'	Stadium: Stadion Budai II. Laszló; Referee: Ádám Németh

7 February 2009 9	Budapest Honvéd	1–1	Fehérvár	Budapest
15:00 CET (UTC+1)	Arsenijević 38'; Genito (yellow card) 82'	Report	Radović (yellow card) 6'; Sitku 23'; Horváth (yellow card) 37'; Lázár (yellow card) 59'	Stadium: Bozsik Stadion; Attendance: 400; Referee: Zoltán Iványi

14 February 2009 10	Budapest Honvéd	5–1	Baktalórántháza	Budapest
13:00 CET (UTC+1)	Maróti (yellow card) 40'; Guié 50', 81'; Dieng 58'; Arsenijević 62'; Smiljanić 67'	Report	Szilágyi (yellow card) 16'; Illés 41'; Tolnai (yellow card) 51'	Stadium: Bozsik Stadion; Attendance: 300; Referee: Katalin Kulcsár

==== Knockout phase ====
Quarter-finals

5 March 2009 First leg	Budapest Honvéd	5–1	Vasas	Budapest
18:00 CET (UTC+1)	Stojaković 35'; Arsenijević 62'; Guié 71', 79'; Dobos 77'	Report	Sowunmi 27'	Stadium: Bozsik Stadion; Attendance: 300; Referee: Szabolcs Szilasi

25 March 2009 Second leg	Vasas	0–0 (1–5 agg.)	Budapest Honvéd	Budapest
17:00 CET (UTC+1)	Vujović (yellow card) 64'; Kiss (yellow card) 86'	Report	Arsenijević (yellow card) 62'; Maróti (yellow card) 65'	Stadium: Stadion Rudolf Illovszky; Referee: Gyöngyi Gaál
Note: Budapest Honvéd won 5-1 on aggregate.

Semi-finals

29 March 2009 First leg	Budapest Honvéd	0–1	Pécs	Budapest
17:30 CEST (UTC+2)	Filó (yellow card) 41'	Report	Berdó 82', (yellow card) 82'	Stadium: Bozsik Stadion; Attendance: 500; Referee: Ádám Farkas

9 April 2009 Second leg	Pécs	1–0 (2–0 agg.)	Budapest Honvéd	Pécs
18:00 CEST (UTC+2)	Berdó (yellow card) 19'; Gyánó (yellow card) 35', (goal) 59'; Présinger (yellow card) 19'	Report	Fazakas (yellow card) 14'; Smiljanić (yellow card) 19'; Filó (red card) 45'; Rigonato (yellow card) 61'; Lungu (yellow card) 90+4'	Stadium: Stadion PMFC; Attendance: 2,000; Referee: István Vad
Note: Pécs won 2–0 on aggregate.

=== UEFA Intertoto Cup ===
First round

22 June 2008 First leg	Zhetysu (Kazakhstan)	1–2	(Hungary) Budapest Honvéd	Taldykorgan, Kazakhstan
19:30 ALMT (UTC+6)	Turenko (yellow card) 5'; Mikhailov 60', (yellow card) 73'; Munteanu (yellow card) 64'	Report	Ivancsics (yellow card) 47'; Hercegfalvi 66'; Bojtor 75'; Horváth (yellow card) 78'	Stadium: Zhetysu Stadium; Attendance: 5,050; Referee: Vlado Svilokos (Croatia)

28 June 2008 Second leg	Budapest Honvéd (Hungary)	4–2 (6–3 agg.)	(Kazakhstan) Zhetysu	Budapest, Hungary
20:00 CEST (UTC+2)	Genito 26', (yellow card) 38'; Smiljanić 45'; Guié 53'; Rigonato (yellow card) 56'; Ivancsics (yellow card) 81'; Bojtor 90'	Report	Kiselyov 52', 74', (yellow card) 70'; Mamonov (yellow card) 64'; Krutskevich (yellow card) 85'	Stadium: Bozsik Stadion; Attendance: 1,200; Referee: Veaceslav Banari (Moldova)
Note: Budapest Honvéd won 6–3 on aggregate.

Second round

5 July 2008 First leg	Teplice (Czech Republic)	1–3	(Hungary) Budapest Honvéd	Teplice, Czech Republic
18:00 CEST (UTC+2)	Lukáš 58', (yellow card) 90+2'	Report	Vincze (yellow card) 10'; Hercegfalvi 35', (yellow card) 90'; Guié 81'; Dieng 90'; Benjamin Angoua (yellow card) 90+1'	Stadium: Na Stínadlech; Attendance: 3,050; Referee: Hannes Kaasik (Estonia)

12 July 2008 Second leg	Budapest Honvéd (Hungary)	0–2 (3–3 agg.)	(Czech Republic) Teplice	Budapest, Hungary
18:00 CEST (UTC+2)	Benjamin Angoua (yellow card) 69'; Vincze (yellow card) 90'	Report	Jun 68'; Rosa 72'	Stadium: Bozsik Stadion; Attendance: 2,100; Referee: Garðar Hinriksson (Iceland)
Note: 3–3 on aggregate. Budapest Honvéd won on away goals.

Third round

19 July 2008 First leg	Sturm Graz (Austria)	0–0	(Hungary) Budapest Honvéd	Graz, Austria
18:00 CEST (UTC+2)		Report		Stadium: UPC-Arena; Attendance: 5,830; Referee: Björn Kuipers (Netherlands)

26 July 2008 Second leg	Budapest Honvéd (Hungary)	1–2 (1–2 agg.)	(Austria) Sturm Graz	Budapest, Hungary
20:00 CEST (UTC+2)	Smiljanić 8'; Ndjodo (yellow card) 12'; Filó (yellow card) 38'; Maróti (yellow card) 45'; Rabóczki (yellow card) 63'; Takács (yellow card) 73'; Vincze (yellow card) 90'	Report	Beichler 72'; Haas 77'	Stadium: Bozsik Stadion; Attendance: 3,500; Referee: Alan Kelly (England)
Note: Sturm Graz won 2–1 on aggregate.

== Statistics ==
=== Appearances and goals ===
No.	Pos	Nat	Player	Total		Nemzeti Bajnokság I		Magyar Kupa		Ligakupa		UEFA Intertoto Cup	
No.	Pos	Nat	Player	Apps	Goals	Apps	Goals	Apps	Goals	Apps	Goals	Apps	Goals
1	GK	(Hungary) HUN	Iván Tóth	20	0	10	0	0	0	10	0	0	0
2	DF	(Hungary) HUN	Géza Fazakas	12	0	4	0	0	0	8	0	0	0
3	FW	(Hungary) HUN	Norbert Palásthy	2	0	1	0	1	0	0	0	0	0
4	DF	(Serbia) SRB	Mićo Smiljanić	44	6	25	1	10	2	4	1	5	2
5	DF	(Ivory Coast) CIV	Benjamin Angoua	27	0	14	0	7	0	4	0	2	0
6	DF	(Hungary) HUN	Tamás Filó	48	2	21	0	9	1	12	1	6	0
7	FW	(Hungary) HUN	Roland Vólent	3	0	3	0	0	0	0	0	0	0
8	FW	(Serbia) SRB	Nemanja Arsenijević	24	10	5	0	5	1	14	9	0	0
9	MF	(Hungary) HUN	Attila Dobos	48	2	25	0	8	0	10	2	5	0
14	DF	(Hungary) HUN	András Debreceni	40	0	21	0	10	0	8	0	1	0
16	DF	(Croatia) CRO	Davor Magoč	22	0	9	0	2	0	11	0	0	0
17	MF	(Senegal) SEN	Abass Cheikh Dieng	55	9	28	2	10	3	11	3	6	1
18	FW	(Ivory Coast) CIV	Abraham Gneki Guié	37	15	17	4	9	5	6	4	5	2
19	MF	(Brazil) BRA	Diego Rigonato	41	7	25	4	7	0	7	3	2	0
21	FW	(Hungary) HUN	Zoltán Hercegfalvi	48	21	28	14	7	1	7	4	6	2
22	MF	(Serbia) SRB	Nenad Stojaković	38	5	19	1	7	1	12	3	0	0
23	DF	(Hungary) HUN	Zoltán Vincze	25	0	13	0	4	0	3	0	5	0
24	MF	(Hungary) HUN	László Horváth	8	0	1	0	1	0	4	0	2	0
25	DF	(Montenegro) MNE	Marko Simić	7	1	3	0	0	0	4	1	0	0
26	MF	(Hungary) HUN	Patrik Hidi	17	1	9	1	0	0	8	0	0	0
27	MF	(Brazil) BRA	Guilherme Moreira	36	8	19	2	9	4	8	2	0	0
28	MF	(Hungary) HUN	Béla Maróti	37	1	21	1	4	0	8	0	4	0
29	DF	(Hungary) HUN	Ákos Takács	32	0	17	0	4	0	5	0	6	0
30	DF	(Zambia) ZAM	Misheck Lungu	19	0	11	0	5	0	3	0	0	0
55	DF	(Serbia) SRB	Dragan Vukmir	18	0	10	0	5	0	3	0	0	0
79	MF	(Mozambique) MOZ	Genito	28	2	18	1	3	0	2	0	5	1
99	GK	(Hungary) HUN	Balázs Rabóczki	40	0	21	0	10	0	3	0	6	0
Youth players:
3	DF	(Hungary) HUN	Máté Madar	4	0	0	0	0	0	4	0	0	0
4	MF	(Hungary) HUN	Zoltán Tóth	2	0	0	0	0	0	2	0	0	0
5	MF	(Hungary) HUN	Adrián Horváth	2	0	0	0	0	0	2	0	0	0
11	GK	(Hungary) HUN	Gergely Juhász	0	0	0	0	0	0	0	0	0	0
11	FW	(Hungary) HUN	Richárd Horváth	1	0	0	0	0	0	1	0	0	0
12	MF	(Hungary) HUN	Csaba Varga	2	0	0	0	0	0	2	0	0	0
13	FW	(Hungary) HUN	Ferenc Kocsis	7	2	2	0	0	0	5	2	0	0
15	MF	(Hungary) HUN	Attila Fritz	0	0	0	0	0	0	0	0	0	0
15	DF	(Hungary) HUN	Attila Vasas	0	0	0	0	0	0	0	0	0	0
16	MF	(Hungary) HUN	Gergő Tárkányi	1	0	0	0	0	0	1	0	0	0
18	DF	(Hungary) HUN	Márkó Sós	0	0	0	0	0	0	0	0	0	0
18	MF	(Peru) PER	Paulo Albarracín	1	0	0	0	0	0	1	0	0	0
32	MF	(Brazil) BRA	Paulo Renato	2	0	0	0	0	0	2	0	0	0
36	DF	(Hungary) HUN	Botond Baráth	0	0	0	0	0	0	0	0	0	0
71	MF	(Hungary) HUN	Armand Nagy	0	0	0	0	0	0	0	0	0	0
90	GK	(Hungary) HUN	Roland Kunsági	2	0	0	0	0	0	2	0	0	0
Players loaned out (for fall):
70	MF	(Mexico) MEX	José Manuel Rivera	1	0	0	0	0	0	1	0	0	0
Players loaned out (for spring):
7	MF	(Hungary) HUN	Gellért Ivancsics	21	2	9	0	2	0	5	2	5	0
11	FW	(Hungary) HUN	Róbert Zsolnai	7	1	2	0	1	1	2	0	2	0
Players loaned out (for full season):
8	FW	(Hungary) HUN	László Bojtor	4	2	0	0	0	0	0	0	4	2
25	FW	(Cameroon) CMR	Edouard Ndjodo	9	0	4	0	0	0	0	0	5	0
27	FW	(Hungary) HUN	Gábor Koós	0	0	0	0	0	0	0	0	0	0
Players left the club (from summer):
Players left the club (from winter):
79	DF	(Liberia) LBR	George Gebro	10	1	3	0	1	0	4	1	2	0

=== Top scorers ===
Includes all competitive matches. The list is sorted by shirt number when total goals are equal.

Position	Nation	Number	Name	Nemzeti Bajnokság I	Magyar Kupa	Ligakupa	UEFA Intertoto Cup	Total
1	(Hungary)	21	Zoltán Hercegfalvi	14	1	4	2	21
2	(Ivory Coast)	18	Abraham Gneki Guié	4	5	4	2	15
3	(Serbia)	8	Nemanja Arsenijević	0	1	9	0	10
4	(Senegal)	17	Abass Cheikh Dieng	2	3	3	1	9
5	(Brazil)	27	Guilherme Moreira	2	4	2	0	8
6	(Brazil)	19	Diego Rigonato	4	0	3	0	7
7	(Serbia)	4	Mićo Smiljanić	1	2	1	2	6
8	(Serbia)	22	Nenad Stojaković	1	1	3	0	5
9	(Hungary)	6	Tamás Filó	0	1	1	0	2
9	(Hungary)	7	Gellért Ivancsics	0	0	2	0	2
9	(Hungary)	8	László Bojtor	0	0	0	2	2
9	(Hungary)	9	Attila Dobos	0	0	2	0	2
9	(Hungary)	13	Ferenc Kocsis	0	0	2	0	2
9	(Mozambique)	79	Genito	1	0	0	1	2
15	(Hungary)	11	Róbert Zsolnai	0	1	0	0	1
15	(Montenegro)	25	Marko Simić	0	0	1	0	1
15	(Hungary)	26	Patrik Hidi	1	0	0	0	1
15	(Hungary)	28	Béla Maróti	1	0	0	0	1
15	(Liberia)	79	George Gebro	0	0	1	0	1
			Own Goals	0	0	0	0	0
			TOTALS	31	19	38	10	98

=== Hat-tricks ===
Player	Against	Result	Date	Competition	Round
(Hungary) Zoltán Hercegfalvi	DVTK	3–1 (H)	8 August 2008	Nemzeti Bajnokság I	3
(Hungary) Zoltán Hercegfalvi	Kecskemét	5–3 (H)	22 November 2008	Ligakupa	6

=== Disciplinary record ===
Includes all competitive matches. Players with 1 card or more included only.

Position	Nation	Number	Name	Nemzeti Bajnokság I		Magyar Kupa		Ligakupa		UEFA Intertoto Cup		Total (Hu Total)	
Position	Nation	Number	Name	Yellow card	Red card	Yellow card	Red card	Yellow card	Red card	Yellow card	Red card	Yellow card	Red card
DF	(Hungary)	2	Géza Fazakas	1	1	0	0	2	0	0	0	3 (1)	1 (1)
DF	(Serbia)	4	Mićo Smiljanić	4	0	4	0	1	0	0	0	9 (4)	0 (0)
MF	(Hungary)	4	Zoltán Tóth	0	0	0	0	1	0	0	0	1 (0)	0 (0)
DF	(Ivory Coast)	5	Benjamin Angoua	2	1	1	1	1	0	2	0	6 (2)	2 (1)
DF	(Hungary)	6	Tamás Filó	3	1	5	0	1	1	1	0	10 (3)	2 (1)
FW	(Hungary)	7	Roland Vólent	1	0	0	0	0	0	0	0	1 (1)	0 (0)
MF	(Hungary)	7	Gellért Ivancsics	2	0	0	0	1	0	2	0	5 (2)	0 (0)
FW	(Serbia)	8	Nemanja Arsenijević	2	0	0	0	1	0	0	0	3 (2)	0 (0)
MF	(Hungary)	9	Attila Dobos	3	0	0	0	0	0	0	0	3 (3)	0 (0)
FW	(Hungary)	13	Ferenc Kocsis	0	0	0	0	0	1	0	0	0 (0)	1 (0)
DF	(Hungary)	14	András Debreceni	5	0	1	0	2	0	0	0	8 (5)	0 (0)
DF	(Croatia)	16	Davor Magoč	1	0	0	0	0	0	0	0	1 (1)	0 (0)
MF	(Senegal)	17	Abass Cheikh Dieng	3	0	0	0	0	0	0	0	3 (3)	0 (0)
MF	(Peru)	18	Paulo Albarracín	0	0	0	0	0	1	0	0	0 (0)	1 (0)
MF	(Brazil)	19	Diego Rigonato	2	0	1	0	1	0	1	0	5 (2)	0 (0)
FW	(Hungary)	21	Zoltán Hercegfalvi	2	0	1	0	0	1	1	0	4 (2)	1 (0)
MF	(Serbia)	22	Nenad Stojaković	1	0	0	0	1	0	0	0	2 (1)	0 (0)
DF	(Hungary)	23	Zoltán Vincze	3	0	0	0	0	0	3	0	6 (3)	0 (0)
MF	(Hungary)	24	László Horváth	0	0	0	1	0	0	1	0	1 (0)	1 (0)
DF	(Montenegro)	25	Marko Simić	1	0	0	0	0	0	0	0	1 (1)	0 (0)
FW	(Cameroon)	25	Edouard Ndjodo	0	0	0	0	0	0	1	0	1 (0)	0 (0)
MF	(Hungary)	26	Patrik Hidi	1	0	0	0	0	0	0	0	1 (1)	0 (0)
MF	(Hungary)	28	Béla Maróti	3	1	1	0	3	0	1	0	8 (3)	1 (1)
DF	(Hungary)	29	Ákos Takács	2	0	1	0	0	1	1	0	4 (2)	1 (0)
DF	(Zambia)	30	Misheck Lungu	2	1	1	0	1	0	0	0	4 (2)	1 (1)
DF	(Serbia)	55	Dragan Vukmir	2	0	1	0	0	0	0	0	3 (2)	0 (0)
MF	(Mozambique)	79	Genito	5	0	0	0	1	0	1	0	7 (5)	0 (0)
DF	(Liberia)	79	George Gebro	2	0	0	0	0	0	0	0	2 (2)	0 (0)
GK	(Hungary)	99	Balázs Rabóczki	1	0	0	0	0	0	1	0	2 (1)	0 (0)
			TOTALS	54	5	17	2	17	5	16	0	104 (54)	12 (5)

=== Clean sheets ===
Position	Nation	Number	Name	Nemzeti Bajnokság I	Magyar Kupa	Ligakupa	UEFA Intertoto Cup	Total
1	(Hungary)	99	Balázs Rabóczki	5	5	0	1	11
2	(Hungary)	1	Iván Tóth	2	0	1	0	3
3	(Hungary)	90	Roland Kunsági	0	0	1	0	1
4	(Hungary)	11	Gergely Juhász	0	0	0	0	0
			TOTALS	7	5	2	1	15
