= 2008 UEFA Intertoto Cup =

UEFA Intertoto Cup
Tournament details
- Dates: 21 June 2008 – 27 July 2008
- Teams: 50

Final positions
- Champions: (Portugal) Braga and 10 others (see below)

Tournament statistics
- Matches played: 78
- Goals scored: 186 (2.38 per match)
- Attendance: 409,738 (5,253 per match)

The regions in a map

The 2008 UEFA Intertoto Cup was the last UEFA Intertoto Cup football tournament, the 14th to be organised by UEFA and the third since the competition's format was given a major overhaul. Fifty teams were invited, with the eleven winners after the third round then advancing to the second qualifying round of the 2008–09 UEFA Cup. The draw took place at UEFA headquarters in Nyon, Switzerland on 21 April 2008. Based on the subsequent progress of the eleven co-winners in their UEFA Cup efforts, Braga was declared the outright winner of the Intertoto Cup.

== Association team allocation ==
50 teams participated in the 2008 UEFA Intertoto Cup from 50 UEFA associations. Below is the scheme for the 2008 UEFA Intertoto Cup. The rankings throughout are based on the 2007 UEFA coefficients.

First round (28 teams):

- 28 from associations 23–36, 38–50, and 53

Second round (28 teams):

- 14 winners from the first round
- 14 from associations 9–22

Third round (22 teams):

- 14 winners from the second round
- 8 from associations 1–8

== First round ==
First leg matches were played on 21 and 22 June 2008 and second leg matches were played on 28 and 29 June 2008.

Team 1	Agg.	Team 2	1st leg	2nd leg
Southern-Mediterranean region
Besa (Albania)	1–1 (a)	(Cyprus) Ethnikos Achnas (Note: Apollon Limassol declined the participation, so Ethnikos Achna will participate instead)	0–0	1–1
Čelik (Bosnia and Herzegovina)	4–4 (a)	(Montenegro) Grbalj	3–2	1–2
Rijeka (Croatia)	0–2	(North Macedonia) Renova	0–0	0–2
Hibernians (Malta)	0–3	(Slovenia) Gorica	0–3	0–0
Central-East region
Zhetysu (Kazakhstan)	3–6	(Hungary) Budapest Honvéd (Note: Fehérvár, Újpest and Kaposvár declined the participation)	1–2	2–4
Mika (Armenia)	2–2 (a)	(Moldova) Tiraspol	2–2	0–0
Neftchi Baku (Azerbaijan)	3–3 (a)	(Slovakia) Nitra	2–0	1–3
Cracovia (Poland)	1–5	(Belarus) Shakhtyor Soligorsk	1–2	0–3
Etzella Ettelbruck (Luxembourg)	2–2 (a)	(Georgia (country)) Locomotive Tbilisi	0–0	2–2
Northern region
Ekranas (Lithuania)	4–0	(Estonia) Narva Trans	1–0	3–0
HB Tórshavn (Faroe Islands)	1–4	(Sweden) Elfsborg	1–4	0–0
Bohemians (Republic of Ireland)	9–3	(Wales) Rhyl	5–1	4–2
Lisburn Distillery (Northern Ireland)	3–6	(Finland) TPS Turku	2–3	1–3
Riga (Latvia)	3–2	(Iceland) Fylkir	1–2	2–0

=== First leg ===
21 June 2008
20:30 CET

Besa (Albania)	0–0	(Cyprus) Ethnikos Achnas
	Report

Qemal Stafa Stadium, Tirana
Attendance: 200
Referee: Alan Black (Northern Ireland)

21 June 2008
19:00 CET

Čelik (Bosnia and Herzegovina)	3–2	(Montenegro) Grbalj
Karić 30'; Hadžić 59' (pen.); Novaković 77'	Report	Kasalica 7'; Pavicević 90+2'

Bilino Polje, Zenica
Attendance: 6,900
Referee: Michael Koukoulakis (Greece)

21 June 2008
18:30 CET

Rijeka (Croatia)	0–0	(North Macedonia) Renova
	Report

Stadion Kantrida, Rijeka
Attendance: 933
Referee: Hubert Siejewicz (Poland)

21 June 2008
18:00 CET

Hibernians (Malta)	0–3	(Slovenia) Gorica
	Report	Xuereb 34' (o.g.); Cvijanović 56'; Velikonja 58'

Hibernians Ground, Paola
Attendance: 496
Referee: Ovidiu Alin Hategan (Romania)

21 June 2008
16:00 CET

Mika (Armenia)	2–2	(Moldova) Tiraspol
Veranyan 18'; Hakobyan 41'	Report	Sidorenko 61' (pen.); Serghei Namaşco 79'

Mika Stadium, Yerevan
Attendance: 2,110
Referee: Ninoslav Spasić (Serbia)

21 June 2008
18:00 CET

Neftchi Baku (Azerbaijan)	2–0	(Slovakia) Nitra
Sadygov 7'; Sadiqov 10'	Report

Tofik Bakhramov Stadium, Baku
Attendance: 9,500
Referee: Marcin Borski (Poland)

21 June 2008

Cracovia (Poland)	1–2	(Belarus) Shakhtyor Soligorsk
Nowak 25'		Lyavonchyk 68'; Bychanok 72'

Stadion Cracovii, Kraków
Attendance: 4,500
Referee: Joseph Attard (Malta)

21 June 2008

Etzella Ettelbruck (Luxembourg)	0–0	(Georgia (country)) Locomotive Tbilisi

Stade Am Deich, Ettelbruck
Attendance: 259
Referee: Gediminas Mažeika (Lithuania)

22 June 2008

Ekranas (Lithuania)	1–0	(Estonia) Narva Trans
Bička 88' (pen.)

Aukštaitija Stadium, Panevėžys
Attendance: 540
Referee: Gabriele Rossi (San Marino)

22 June 2008

HB Tórshavn (Faroe Islands)	1–4	(Sweden) Elfsborg
C. Jacobsen 16'		Kurbegović 12'; Mobaeck 26', 55'; Sjöhage 50'

Tórsvøllur, Tórshavn
Attendance: 320
Referee: Calum Murray (Scotland)

21 June 2008

Bohemians (Republic of Ireland)	5–1	(Wales) Rhyl
J. Byrne 51'; O. Heary 59'; Brennan 63' (pen.); Fenn 71'; Crowe 80'	Report	Connolly 25'

Dalymount Park, Dublin
Attendance: 1,342
Referee: Jöuni Hietala (Finland)

21 June 2008

Lisburn Distillery (Northern Ireland)	2–3	(Finland) TPS Turku
Armour 42', 90+' (pen.)		Pertot 68', 88'; Ääritalo 76'

Ballymena Showgrounds, Ballymena
Attendance: 290
Referee: Luc Wouters (Belgium)

21 June 2008

Riga (Latvia)	1–2	(Iceland) Fylkir
Novikov 76'		Gíslason 26'; Gravesen 70' (pen.)

Daugava Stadium, Liepāja
Attendance: 150
Referee: Svein Edvartsen (Norway)

22 June 2008
14:30 CET

Zhetysu (Kazakhstan)	1–2	(Hungary) Budapest Honvéd
Mikhailov 60'	Report	Hercegfalvi 66'; Bojtor 75'

Zhetysu Stadium, Taldykorgan
Attendance: 5,050
Referee: Vlado Svilokos (Croatia)

=== Second leg ===
28 June 2008

Ethnikos Achnas (Cyprus)	1–1	(Albania) Besa
Manousakis 57'		Leçi 90+'

Dasaki Stadium, Achna
Attendance: 500
Referee: Karen Nalbandyan (Armenia)

Ethnikos Achnas 1–1 Besa on aggregate. Besa won on away goals rule.

28 June 2008

Grbalj (Montenegro)	2–1	(Bosnia and Herzegovina) Čelik
Pavićević 51'; Kasalica 75'		Hadžić 18'

Gradski stadion, Nikšić
Attendance: 1,800
Referee: Sándor Andó-Szabó (Hungary)

Grbalj 4–4 Čelik on aggregate. Grbalj won on away goals rule.

28 June 2008
17:00 CET

Renova (North Macedonia)	2–0	(Croatia) Rijeka
Iseni 5', 46'

Gradski Stadion, Skopje
Attendance: 2,000
Referee: Simon Lee Evans (Wales)

Renova won 2–0 on aggregate.

28 June 2008

Gorica (Slovenia)	0–0	(Malta) Hibernians
	report

Nova Gorica Sports Park, Nova Gorica
Attendance: 484
Referee: Sergey Shmolik (Belarus)

Gorica won 3–0 on aggregate.

28 June 2008

Budapest Honvéd (Hungary)	4–2	(Kazakhstan) Zhetysu
Genito 26'; Smiljanić 45+'; Guie Guie 53'; Bojtor 90+'		Kiselyov 52', 74'

Bozsik József Stadion, Budapest
Attendance: 1,200
Referee: Veaceslav Banari (Moldova)

Budapest Honvéd won 6–3 on aggregate.

28 June 2008

Tiraspol (Moldova)	0–0	(Armenia) Mika

Sheriff Stadium, Tiraspol
Attendance: 2,000
Referee: Dimitrios Kalopoulos (Greece)

Tiraspol 2–2 Mika on aggregate. Tiraspol won on away goals rule.

28 June 2008

Nitra (Slovakia)	3–1	(Azerbaijan) Neftchi Baku
Semeník 21', 83'; Čeman 46'	Report	José Carlos 84'

Štadión pod Zoborom, Nitra
Attendance: 2,860
Referee: Novo Panić (Bosnia and Herzegovina)

Nitra 3–3 Neftchi Baku on aggregate. Neftchi Baku won on away goals rule.

29 June 2008

Shakhtyor Soligorsk (Belarus)	3–0	(Poland) Cracovia
Kavalchuk 71' (pen.); Krot 90+'; Nikiforenka 90+'

Stroitel Stadium, Soligorsk
Attendance: 1,720
Referee: Akmalkhan Kholmatov (Kazakhstan)

Shakhtyor Soligorsk won 5–1 on aggregate.

28 June 2008

Locomotive Tbilisi (Georgia (country))	2–2	(Luxembourg) Etzella Ettelbruck
Chirikashvili 28'; Aleksidze 30'		Da Luz 21'; F. Leweck 81' (pen.)

Mikheil Meskhi Stadium, Tbilisi
Attendance: 500
Referee: Pavle Radovanović (Montenegro)

Locomotive Tbilisi 2–2 Etzella Ettelbruck on aggregate. Etzella Ettelbruck won on away goals rule.

28 June 2008

Narva Trans (Estonia)	0–3	(Lithuania) Ekranas
		Bička 35'; Trakys 37'; Matović 79'

A. Le Coq Arena, Tallinn
Attendance: 100
Referee: Pavel Olšiak (Slovakia)

Ekranas won 4–0 on aggregate.

28 June 2008

Elfsborg (Sweden)	0–0	(Faroe Islands) HB Tórshavn

Borås Arena, Borås
Attendance: 2,135
Referee: Anthony Buttimer (Republic of Ireland)

Elfsborg won 4–1 on aggregate.

28 June 2008

Rhyl (Wales)	2–4	(Republic of Ireland) Bohemians
Connolly 37', 41'		O'Donnell 29'; J. Byrne 32' (pen.); McGuinness 34'; Singh 42'

Belle Vue, Rhyl
Attendance: 1,453
Referee: Aleksei Kulbakov (Belarus)

Bohemians won 9–3 on aggregate.

29 June 2008

TPS Turku (Finland)	3–1	(Northern Ireland) Lisburn Distillery
Ääritalo 42'; Paatelainen 75'; One 86'		G. Browne 84' (pen.)

Veritas Stadion, Turku
Attendance: 1,783
Referee: Paulius Malžinskas (Lithuania)

TPS Turku won 6–3 on aggregate.

29 June 2008

Fylkir (Iceland)	0–2	(Latvia) Riga
		Kalonas 7', 73'

Laugardalsvöllur, Reykjavík
Attendance: 531
Referee: Pol van Boekel (Netherlands)

Riga won 3–2 on aggregate.

== Second round ==
The first leg was held on 5 and 6 July 2008, while the second leg was held on 12 and 13 July 2008.

Team 1	Agg.	Team 2	1st leg	2nd leg
Southern-Mediterranean region
Chernomorets Burgas (Bulgaria)	3–1	(Slovenia) Gorica	1–1	2–0
Grbalj (Montenegro)	2–3	(Turkey) Sivasspor	2–2	0–1
Grasshopper Zürich (Switzerland)	5–1	(Albania) Besa	2–1	3–0
Renova (North Macedonia)	1–3	(Israel) Bnei Sakhnin	1–2	0–1
OFK Beograd (Serbia)	2–3	(Greece) Panionios	1–0	1–3
Central-East region
Germinal Beerschot (Belgium)	1–2	(Azerbaijan) Neftchi Baku	1–1	0–1
Saturn Moscow Oblast (Russia)	8–1	(Luxembourg) Etzella Ettelbruck	7–0	1–1
Tiraspol (Moldova)	1–3	(Ukraine) Tavriya Simferopol	0–0	1–3
Sturm Graz (Austria)	2–0	(Belarus) Shakhtyor Soligorsk	2–0	0–0
Teplice (Note: 1. FC Brno (4th team of Gambrinus liga) did not apply for the Intertoto Cup.) (Czech Republic)	3–3 (a)	(Hungary) Budapest Honvéd	1–3	2–0
Northern region
TPS Turku (Finland)	1–4	(Denmark) Odense	1–2	0–2
Hibernian (Scotland)	0–4	(Sweden) Elfsborg	0–2	0–2
Ekranas (Lithuania)	1–7	(Norway) Rosenborg	1–3	0–4
Riga (Latvia)	2–2 (a)	(Republic of Ireland) Bohemians	1–0	1–2

=== First leg ===
5 July 2008

Chernomorets Burgas (Bulgaria)	1–1	(Slovenia) Gorica
Michel 63'	Report	Osterc 57'

Vasil Levski National Stadium, Sofia
Attendance: 555
Referee: Asaf Kenan (Israel)

5 July 2008

Grbalj (Montenegro)	2–2	(Turkey) Sivasspor
Francišković 23', 34'		Mehmet 14', 39' (pen.)

Gradski stadion, Nikšić
Attendance: 1,000
Referee: Jorge Sousa (Portugal)

5 July 2008

Grasshopper Zürich (Switzerland)	2–1	(Albania) Besa
Lulić 66', 79'		Fortunat 83'

Stadion Niedermatten, Wohlen
Attendance: 620
Referee: Jiří Jech (Czech Republic)

6 July 2008

Renova (North Macedonia)	1–2	(Israel) Bnei Sakhnin
Angelovski 65'		Khalaila 41' (pen.); Rabah 64'

Gradski Stadion, Skopje
Attendance: 4,000
Referee: Markus Strömbergsson (Sweden)

6 July 2008

OFK Beograd (Serbia)	1–0	(Greece) Panionios
Kaluđerović 69'

Omladinski Stadium, Belgrade
Attendance: 700
Referee: Manuel Gräfe (Germany)

5 July 2008

Germinal Beerschot (Belgium)	1–1	(Azerbaijan) Neftchi Baku
Malki 18'	Report	Adamia 31'

Olympisch Stadion, Antwerp
Attendance: 4,410
Referee: Dejan Filipović (Serbia)

5 July 2008

Saturn Moscow Oblast (Russia)	7–0	(Luxembourg) Etzella Ettelbruck
Kirichenko 2', 35', 70', 71'; Angbwa 13'; Topić 18'; Ivanov 65'

Saturn Stadium, Ramenskoye
Attendance: 8,750
Referee: Stelios Trifonos (Cyprus)

5 July 2008

Tiraspol (Moldova)	0–0	(Ukraine) Tavriya Simferopol

Sheriff Stadium, Tiraspol
Attendance: 1,650
Referee: Tsvetan Georgiev (Bulgaria)

5 July 2008

Sturm Graz (Austria)	2–0	(Belarus) Shakhtyor Soligorsk
Feldhofer 38'; Kienzl 55'

UPC-Arena, Graz
Attendance: 5,680
Referee: Libor Kovařík (Czech Republic)

5 July 2008

Teplice (Czech Republic)	1–3	(Hungary) Budapest Honvéd
Lukáš 58'		Hercegfalvi 35'; Abraham 81'; Abass 90+'

Na Stínadlech, Teplice
Attendance: 3,050
Referee: Hannes Kaasik (Estonia)

6 July 2008

TPS Turku (Finland)	1–2	(Denmark) Odense
One 37'		Fall 5'; Sørensen 84'

Veritas Stadion, Turku
Attendance: 2,245
Referee: Andrejs Sipailo (Latvia)

6 July 2008

Hibernian (Scotland)	0–2	(Sweden) Elfsborg
		Bajrami 17'; Augustsson 65'

Easter Road, Edinburgh
Attendance: 7,809
Referee: Abby Toussaint (Luxembourg)

6 July 2008

Ekranas (Lithuania)	1–3	(Norway) Rosenborg
Varnas 14'		Strand 12'; Lago 35'; Koné 67'

Aukštaitija Stadium, Panevėžys
Attendance: 1,044
Referee: Adrian McCourt (Northern Ireland)

6 July 2008

Riga (Latvia)	1–0	(Republic of Ireland) Bohemians
Leonov 45'

Daugava Stadium, Liepāja
Attendance: 1,500
Referee: Robert Krajnc (Slovenia)

=== Second leg ===
12 July 2008

Gorica (Slovenia)	0–2	(Bulgaria) Chernomorets Burgas
	Report	Remzi 54' (pen.); Michel 86'

Nova Gorica Sports Park, Nova Gorica
Attendance: 700
Referee: Marcin Borski (Poland)

Chernomorets Burgas won 3–1 on aggregate.

13 July 2008

Sivasspor (Turkey)	1–0	(Montenegro) Grbalj
Diallo 83'

Sivas 4 Eylül Stadium, Sivas
Attendance: 7,477
Referee: Igor Ishchenko (Ukraine)

Sivasspor won 3–2 on aggregate.

12 July 2008

Besa (Albania)	0–3	(Switzerland) Grasshopper Zürich
		Šabanović 54', 68'; Zuber 86'

Niko Dovana Stadium, Durrës
Attendance: 2,000
Referee: Augustus Constantin (Romania)

Grasshopper Zürich won 5–1 on aggregate.

12 July 2008

Bnei Sakhnin (Israel)	1–0	(North Macedonia) Renova
B. Ganayem 17'

Kiryat Eliezer Stadium, Haifa
Attendance: 2,500
Referee: István Vad II (Hungary)

Bnei Sakhnin won 3–1 on aggregate.

13 July 2008

Panionios (Greece)	3–1	(Serbia) OFK Beograd
Barkoglou 25'; Choutos 45+', 63' (pen.)		William 55'

Nea Smyrni Stadium, Athens
Attendance: 1,928
Referee: Sascha Kever (Switzerland)

Panionios won 3–2 on aggregate.

12 July 2008

Neftchi Baku (Azerbaijan)	1–0	(Belgium) Germinal Beerschot
Allahverdiyev 57'	Report

Tofik Bakhramov Stadium, Baku
Attendance: 22,000
Referee: Mark Clattenburg (England)

Neftchi Baku won 2–1 on aggregate.

13 July 2008

Etzella Ettelbruck (Luxembourg)	1–1	(Russia) Saturn Moscow Oblast
Da Luz 70'		Kovel 77'

Stade Josy Barthel, Luxembourg
Attendance: 200
Referee: René Rogalla (Switzerland)

Saturn Moscow Oblast won 8–1 on aggregate.

13 July 2008

Tavriya Simferopol (Ukraine)	3–1	(Moldova) Tiraspol
Ljubenović 10'; Homenyuk 45+'; Gigiadze 51'		Bulat 90+'

Lokomotiv Stadium, Simferopol
Attendance: 10,000
Referee: Anders Hermansen (Denmark)

Tavriya Simferopol won 3–1 on aggregate.

13 July 2008

Shakhtyor Soligorsk (Belarus)	0–0	(Austria) Sturm Graz

Stroitel Stadium, Soligorsk
Attendance: 2,400
Referee: Martin Atkinson (England)

Sturm Graz won 2–0 on aggregate.

12 July 2008

Budapest Honvéd (Hungary)	0–2	(Czech Republic) Teplice
		Jun 68'; Rosa 71'

Bozsik József Stadion, Budapest
Attendance: 2,100
Referee: Garðar Hinriksson (Iceland)

Budapest Honvéd 3–3 Teplice on aggregate. Budapest Honvéd advanced on away goals rule.

13 July 2008

Odense (Denmark)	2–0	(Finland) TPS Turku
Fall 21', 52'

Fionia Park, Odense
Attendance: 4,034
Referee: Igor Zakharov (Russia)

Odense won 4–1 on aggregate.

12 July 2008

Elfsborg (Sweden)	2–0	(Scotland) Hibernian
M. Florén 20'; Bajrami 80'

Borås Arena, Borås
Attendance: 3,523
Referee: Marijo Strahonja (Croatia)

Elfsborg won 4–0 on aggregate.

13 July 2008

Rosenborg (Norway)	4–0	(Lithuania) Ekranas
Konan Ya 16'; Iversen 48'; Koné 52', 90+'

Lerkendal Stadion, Trondheim
Attendance: 4,986
Referee: Babak Guliyev (Azerbaijan)

Rosenborg won 7–1 on aggregate.

12 July 2008

Bohemians (Republic of Ireland)	2–1	(Latvia) Riga
McGuinness 21'; Brennan 90' (pen.)		Chirkin 65'

Dalymount Park, Dublin
Attendance: 2,395
Referee: Brage Sandmoen (Norway)

Bohemians 2–2 Riga on aggregate. Riga advanced on the away goals rule.

== Third round ==
The first leg was held on 19 and 20 July 2008, while the second leg was held on 26 and 27 July 2008. The 11 winners entered the second qualifying round of the UEFA Cup.

Team 1	Agg.	Team 2	1st leg	2nd leg
Southern-Mediterranean region
Bnei Sakhnin (Israel)	1–3	(Spain) Deportivo La Coruña	1–2	0–1
Panionios (Greece)	0–2	(Italy) Napoli	0–1	0–1
Sivasspor (Turkey)	0–5	(Portugal) Braga	0–2	0–3
Grasshopper Zürich (Switzerland)	4–0	(Bulgaria) Chernomorets Burgas	3–0	1–0
Central-East region
Saturn Moscow Oblast (Russia)	1–3	(Germany) Stuttgart	1–0	0–3 (aet)
Neftchi Baku (Azerbaijan)	2–3	(Romania) Vaslui	2–1	0–2
Rennes (France)	1–1 (10–9 p)	(Ukraine) Tavriya Simferopol	1–0	0–1 (aet)
Sturm Graz (Austria)	2–1	(Hungary) Budapest Honvéd	0–0	2–1
Northern region
NAC Breda (Netherlands)	1–2	(Norway) Rosenborg	1–0	0–2
Odense (Denmark)	2–3	(England) Aston Villa	2–2	0–1
Elfsborg (Sweden)	1–0	(Latvia) Riga	1–0	0–0

=== First leg ===
19 July 2008

Bnei Sakhnin (Israel)	1–2	(Spain) Deportivo La Coruña
B. Ganayem 59'		Lafita 54'; Riki 57'

Kiryat Eliezer Stadium, Haifa
Attendance: 2,500
Referee: Fredy Fautrel (France)

20 July 2008

Panionios (Greece)	0–1	(Italy) Napoli
		Bogliacino 31'

Nea Smyrni Stadium, Athens
Attendance: 3,125
Referee: Duarte Gomes (Portugal)

20 July 2008

Sivasspor (Turkey)	0–2	(Portugal) Braga
		Linz 45+'; Moisés 78'

Sivas 4 Eylül Stadium, Sivas
Attendance: 7,454
Referee: Dougie McDonald (Scotland)

19 July 2008

Grasshopper Zürich (Switzerland)	3–0	(Bulgaria) Chernomorets Burgas
Salatić 21'; Zárate 41'; Šabanović 80'

Letzigrund, Zürich
Attendance: 1,200
Referee: Damien Ledentu (France)

19 July 2008

Saturn Moscow Oblast (Russia)	1–0	(Germany) Stuttgart
Kirichenko 4'

Saturn Stadium, Ramenskoye
Attendance: 10,100
Referee: Peter Rasmussen (Denmark)

19 July 2008

Neftchi Baku (Azerbaijan)	2–1	(Romania) Vaslui
Herasymyuk 28'; Sadiqov 84'	Report	Genchev 29'

Tofik Bakhramov Stadium, Baku
Attendance: 30,000
Referee: Igor Egorov (Russia)

19 July 2008

Rennes (France)	1–0	(Ukraine) Tavriya Simferopol
Fanni 90+'

Stade de la Route de Lorient, Rennes
Attendance: 18,266
Referee: Nicola Rizzoli (Italy)

19 July 2008

Sturm Graz (Austria)	0–0	(Hungary) Budapest Honvéd

UPC-Arena, Graz
Attendance: 5,830
Referee: Björn Kuipers (Netherlands)

19 July 2008

NAC Breda (Netherlands)	1–0	(Norway) Rosenborg
Amoah 19'

Rat Verlegh Stadion, Breda
Attendance: 6,500
Referee: Levan Paniashvili (Georgia)

19 July 2008

Odense (Denmark)	2–2	(England) Aston Villa
Sidwell 25' (o.g.); Møller Christensen 90'		Carew 7'; Laursen 76'

Fionia Park, Odense
Attendance: 11,393
Referee: Andrea De Marco (Italy)

19 July 2008

Elfsborg (Sweden)	1–0	(Latvia) Riga
Avdić 18'

Borås Arena, Borås
Attendance: 3,351
Referee: Oleh Oriekhov (Ukraine)

=== Second leg ===
26 July 2008

Deportivo La Coruña (Spain)	1–0	(Israel) Bnei Sakhnin
Valerón 40'

Estadio Riazor, A Coruña
Attendance: 9,323
Referee: Bas Nijhuis (Netherlands)

Deportivo La Coruña won 3–1 on aggregate.

26 July 2008

Napoli (Italy)	1–0	(Greece) Panionios
Hamšík 65'

Stadio San Paolo, Naples
Attendance: 54,137
Referee: César Muñiz Fernández (Spain)

Napoli won 2–0 on aggregate.

26 July 2008

Braga (Portugal)	3–0	(Turkey) Sivasspor
Matheus 45'; Linz 57'; Aguiar 70' (pen.)

Estádio Municipal de Braga, Braga
Attendance: 9,014
Referee: Felix Brych (Germany)

Braga won 5–0 on aggregate.

26 July 2008

Chernomorets Burgas (Bulgaria)	0–1	(Switzerland) Grasshopper Zürich
		Bobadilla 53'

Georgi Asparuhov Stadium, Sofia
Attendance: 250
Referee: Brage Sandmoen (Norway)

Grasshopper Zürich won 4–0 on aggregate.

27 July 2008

Stuttgart (Germany)	3–0 (a.e.t.)	(Russia) Saturn Moscow Oblast
Šimák 82'; Marica 107', 110'

Gottlieb-Daimler-Stadion, Stuttgart
Attendance: 12,600
Referee: Bernardino González Vázquez (Spain)

Stuttgart won 3–1 on aggregate.

26 July 2008

Vaslui (Romania)	2–0	(Azerbaijan) Neftchi Baku
Burdujan 30'; Temwanjera 38'	Report

Stadionul Municipal, Vaslui
Attendance: 3,574
Referee: Robert Schörgenhofer (Austria)

Vaslui won 3–2 on aggregate.

26 July 2008

Tavriya Simferopol (Ukraine)	1–0 (a.e.t.)	(France) Rennes
Gigiadze 71'
Penalties
Halyuza (penalty scored); Holaydo (penalty scored); Donets' (penalty missed); Gigiadze (penalty scored); Ljubenović (penalty missed); Zborovskyi (penalty scored); Ilnytskyi (penalty scored); Alunderis (penalty scored); Hajduczek (penalty scored); Kovpak (penalty scored); Dykan (penalty scored); Halyuza (penalty missed)	9–10	(penalty scored) Leroy; (penalty scored) Pagis; (penalty missed) Thomert; (penalty missed) Lemoine; (penalty scored) Hansson; (penalty scored) Sorlin; (penalty scored) Fanni; (penalty scored) Danzé; (penalty scored) Echiéjilé; (penalty scored) Dembélé; (penalty scored) Douchez; (penalty scored) Leroy

Lokomotiv Stadium, Simferopol
Attendance: 15,000
Referee: Stefan Johannesson (Sweden)

Tavriya Simferopol 1–1 Rennes on aggregate. Rennes won in a penalty shootout.

26 July 2008

Budapest Honvéd (Hungary)	1–2	(Austria) Sturm Graz
Smiljanić 8'		Beichler 72'; Haas 77'

Bozsik József Stadion, Budapest
Attendance: 3,500
Referee: Alan Kelly (England)

Sturm Graz won 2–1 on aggregate.

27 July 2008

Rosenborg (Norway)	2–0	(Netherlands) NAC Breda
Stoor 34'; Iversen 50' (pen.)

Lerkendal Stadion, Trondheim
Attendance: 5,815
Referee: Cristian Balaj (Romania)

Rosenborg won 2–1 on aggregate.

26 July 2008

Aston Villa (England)	1–0	(Denmark) Odense
A. Young 50'

Villa Park, Birmingham
Attendance: 34,394
Referee: Cüneyt Çakır (Turkey)

Aston Villa won 3–2 on aggregate.

27 July 2008

Riga (Latvia)	0–0	(Sweden) Elfsborg

Daugava Stadium, Liepāja
Attendance: 1,500
Referee: Aleksei Nikolaev (Russia)

Elfsborg won 1–0 on aggregate.

== Winners ==
Eight of the eleven Intertoto Cup co-winners entered the UEFA Cup by winning their qualifying ties and progressed to the first round. Five of those eight sides survived the first round and entered the Group stage. Four of those five qualified for the round of 32. Only Braga progressed to the round of 16, making them the overall winners.

The 11 co-winners were:

- (Portugal) Braga (Overall winners) (round of 16, lost to Paris Saint-Germain)
- (England) Aston Villa (round of 32, lost to CSKA Moscow)
- (Spain) Deportivo La Coruña (round of 32, lost to AaB)
- (Germany) Stuttgart (round of 32, lost to Zenit Saint Petersburg)
- (Norway) Rosenborg (Group stage, fifth in Group G)
- (Italy) Napoli (First round, lost to Benfica)
- (France) Rennes (First round, lost to Twente)
- (Romania) Vaslui (First round, lost to Slavia Prague)
- (Sweden) Elfsborg (Second qualifying round, lost to St Patrick's Athletic)
- (Switzerland) Grasshopper Zürich (Second qualifying round, lost to Lech Poznań)
- (Austria) Sturm Graz (Second qualifying round, lost to Zürich)

== See also ==
- 2008–09 UEFA Champions League
- 2008–09 UEFA Cup
