= Géza Fazakas =

Hungarian footballer

Personal information
- Full name: Géza Fazakas
- Date of birth: 18 January 1990 (age 36)
- Place of birth: Budapest, Hungary
- Height: 1.74 m (5 ft 9 in)
- Position: Right-back

Team information
- Current team: Vác
- Number: 18

Youth career
- 2002–2008: Honvéd

Senior career*
| Years | Team | Apps | (Gls) |
| 2008–2012 | Honvéd | 5 | (0) |
| 2007–2010 | → Honvéd II | 29 | (3) |
| 2010–2012 | → BKV Előre (loan) | 64 | (5) |
| 2012–2015 | → Sopron (loan) | 72 | (0) |
| 2015 | Kisvárda | 1 | (0) |
| 2016–2018 | Sopron | 47 | (1) |
| 2018–2021 | III. Kerület | 61 | (2) |
| 2021– | Vác | 18 | (1) |

International career
| 2008–2009 | Hungary U-19 | | |
- * Club domestic league appearances and goals as of 19:43, 3 February 2022 (UTC)

Géza Fazakas (born 18 January 1990 in Budapest) is a Hungarian football player who currently plays for Vác FC.

== Club career ==
=== Budapest Honved ===
He made his debut of 3 April 2009 against Győri ETO FC in a match where he earned his first red card of his professional career after only 25 minutes of football in a match that ended 0–0.

== Personal life ==
Fazakas lives with his partner, Orsolya, with whom he has a son.

== Club honours ==
=== Budapest Honvéd FC ===
- Hungarian Cup:
  - Winner: 2008–09
- Hungarian Super Cup:
  - Runners-up: 2009
