= Mićo Smiljanić =

Serbian footballer

Mićo Smiljanić Мићо Смиљанић
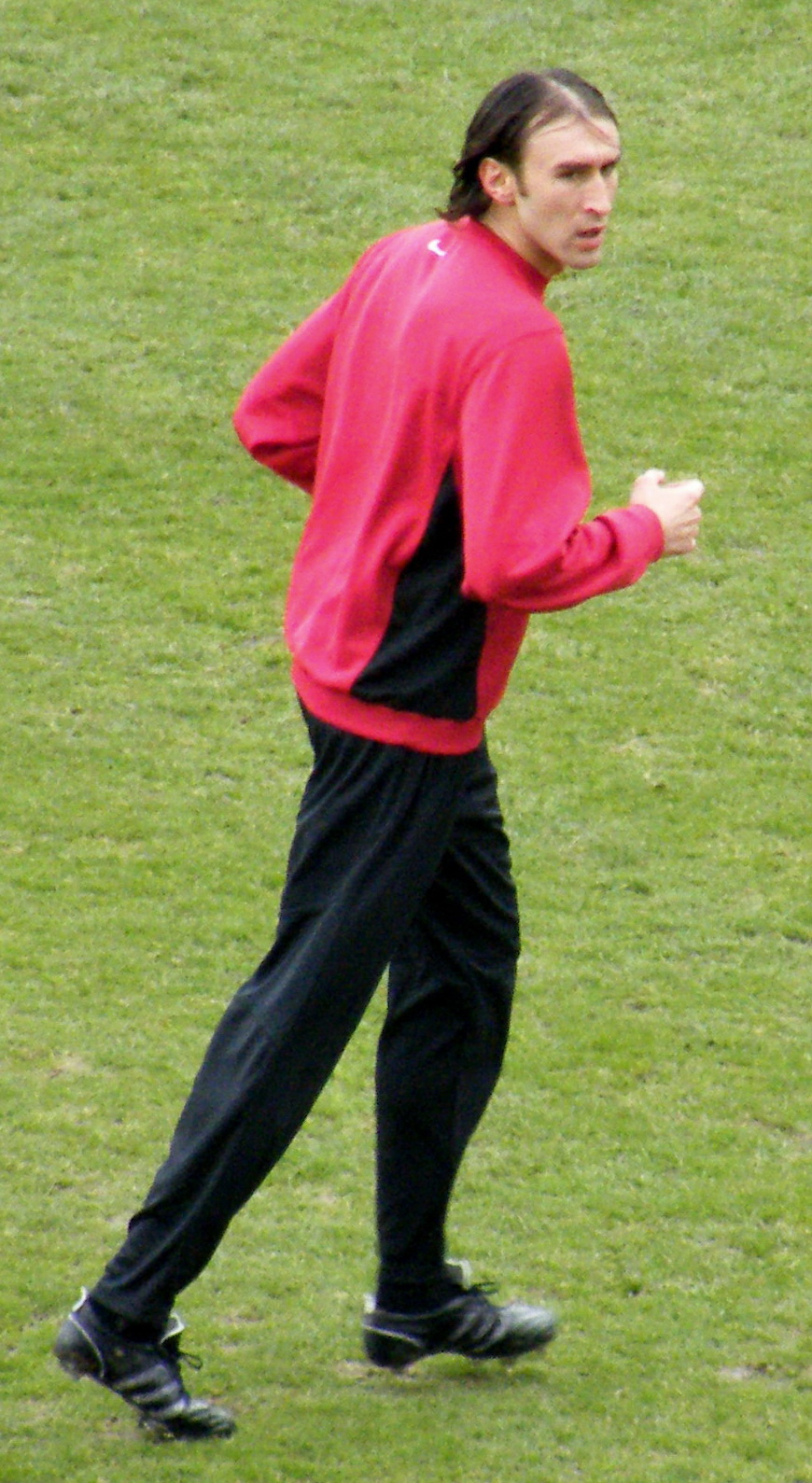
- Smiljanić with Budapest Honvéd in 2009

Personal information
- Full name: Mićo Smiljanić
- Date of birth: 4 September 1974 (age 52)
- Place of birth: Apatin, SFR Yugoslavia
- Height: 1.88 m (6 ft 2 in)
- Position: Defender

Youth career
- Mladost Apatin

Senior career*
Years	Team	Apps	(Gls)
199x–199x	Mladost Apatin		
1994–1998	Spartak Subotica		
1998–1999	Diósgyőr	30	(3)
1999–2000	Ashdod	38	(0)
2000–2003	MTK Hungária	76	(2)
2003–2006	Panionios	53	(4)
2006	Mladost Apatin	9	(1)
2007–2009	Budapest Honvéd	57	(2)
2009–2012	Sopron	70	(10)
2012–2015	Biatorbágy	55	(7)
Total		388	(29)
- * Club domestic league appearances and goals

Mićo Smiljanić (Serbian Cyrillic: Мићо Смиљанић; born 4 September 1974) is a Serbian former footballer who played as a defender.

== Career ==
After playing for Spartak Subotica, Smiljanić moved abroad and joined Hungarian club Diósgyőr in 1998. He would spend most of his playing career in Hungary, winning the national championship with MTK Hungária in 2003. Throughout the years, Smiljanić also played professionally in Israel (Ashdod) and Greece (Panionios).

== Honours ==
MTK Hungária

- Nemzeti Bajnokság I: 2002–03

Budapest Honvéd

- Magyar Kupa: 2006–07, 2008–09

Sopron

- Nemzeti Bajnokság III: 2010–11
