= Guilherme Moreira =

Brazilian footballer (born 1987)

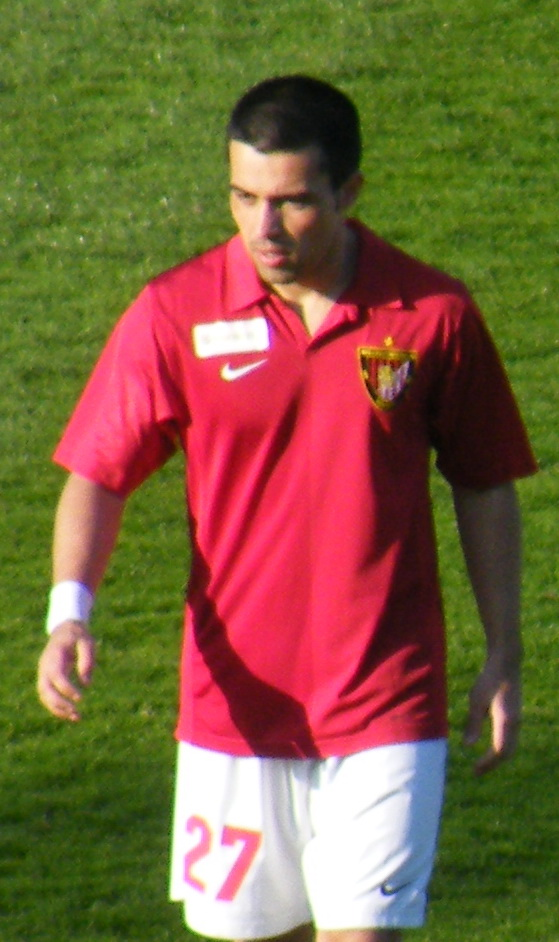
- Moreira in 2011

Personal information
- Full name: Guilherme Rodrigues Moreira
- Date of birth: 11 April 1987 (age 39)
- Place of birth: Alegre, Brazil
- Height: 1.71 m (5 ft 7 in)
- Position: Midfielder

Team information
- Current team: Saimit Kabin United
- Number: 10

Youth career
- Coritiba

Senior career*
Years	Team	Apps	(Gls)
2007–2008	Coritiba		
2008–2011	Budapest Honvéd	35	(0)
2011–2013	Clermont Foot	16	(0)
2014–2015	Sông Lam Nghệ An	20	(1)
2015	Marília		
2015–2016	Al-Tai		
2016	ASA	1	(0)
2017	Super Power	28	(3)
2018	Moghreb Tétouan		
2019	Ayutthaya United	30	(3)
2020	Uthai Thani	4	(0)
2020–2021	Bankhai United	16	(3)
2021	Pattani	0	(0)
2021–2022	Muang Loei United	3	(0)
2022	STK Muangnont	11	(2)
2023	Bankhai United	11	(1)
2023	Saimit Kabin United	10	(2)
2024	Phitsanulok Unity	23	(6)
2025–	Saimit Kabin United	0	(0)
- * Club domestic league appearances and goals as of 18 March 2024 (UTC)

Guilherme Rodrigues Moreira (born 11 April 1987), commonly known as Moreira, is a Brazilian professional footballer who plays for Thai League 3 club Saimit Kabin United.

== Career ==
Moreira made his debut for Budapest Honvéd on 27 September 2008 against Újpest FC in a match that ended 1-1.

== Honours ==
Budapest Honvéd

- Hungarian Cup: 2008–09
- Hungarian Super Cup runners-up: 2009
