= Attila Fritz =

Hungarian footballer

Personal information
- Full name: Attila Fritz
- Date of birth: 17 July 1986 (age 40)
- Place of birth: Budapest, Hungary
- Height: 1.66 m (5 ft 5 in)
- Position: Midfielder

Team information
- Current team: Szolnok
- Number: 25

Youth career
- 2002–2006: Csepel
- 2006–2007: Honvéd

Senior career*
Years	Team	Apps	(Gls)
2007–2010	Honvéd II	54	(21)
2008–2009	Honvéd	3	(0)
2010	Hévíz	14	(0)
2010–2012	Vecsés	60	(0)
2012–	Szolnok	33	(0)
- * Club domestic league appearances and goals as of 9 March 2014

Attila Fritz (born 17 July 1986) is a Hungarian football player who currently plays for Szolnoki MÁV FC.

== Club career ==
=== Budapest Honved ===
He made his debut of 15 March 2008 against Pécsi Mecsek FC in a match that ended 2–1.

== Club honours ==
=== Budapest Honvéd FC ===
- Hungarian Cup:
  - Winner: 2008–09
  - Runners-up: 2007–08
- Hungarian Super Cup:
  - Runners-up: 2007, 2009
