= Nemanja Arsenijević =

Serbian footballer

Nemanja Arsenijević Немања Арсенијевић
Personal information
- Full name: Nemanja Arsenijević
- Date of birth: 29 March 1986 (age 40)
- Place of birth: Titovo Užice, SFR Yugoslavia
- Height: 1.73 m (5 ft 8 in)
- Position: Forward

Youth career
- Sloboda Užice

Senior career*
Years	Team	Apps	(Gls)
2003–2004	Sloboda Užice	28	(19)
2004–2008	OFK Beograd	57	(11)
2006	→ Srem (loan)	1	(0)
2006	→ Borac Čačak (loan)	15	(1)
2008	→ Mladost Lučani (loan)	8	(0)
2008–2009	Honvéd	5	(0)
2008–2009	Honvéd II	9	(5)
2009–2010	Sevojno	27	(7)
2010	Sloboda Užice	15	(7)
2011–2012	Asteras Tripolis	15	(0)
2013	Hapoel Acre	9	(1)
2013–2014	Novi Pazar	26	(9)
2014–2015	Jagodina	22	(2)
2015–2016	Rad	29	(5)
2016–2017	Sparta	7	(0)
2017	Radnik Surdulica	13	(3)
Total		286	(70)

International career
2004–2005	Serbia and Montenegro U19 (Note: Only official UEFA matches included)	10	(1)
- * Club domestic league appearances and goals

Nemanja Arsenijević (Serbian Cyrillic: Немања Арсенијевић; born 6 January 1986) is a Serbian former professional footballer who played as a forward.

== Club career ==
After an impressive debut season with the Sloboda Užice in the Serbian League West, Arsenijević was transferred to OFK Beograd in the summer of 2004. He spent four years at the club, including loan spells to Srem, Borac Čačak, and Mladost Lučani. In the summer of 2008, Arsenijević went abroad and spent one season with the Hungarian club Honvéd.

In the summer of 2017, Arsenijević decided to retire from professional football due to heart problems, aged 31.

== International career ==
Arsenijević represented Serbia and Montenegro at the 2005 UEFA European Under-19 Championship, scoring one goal in the tournament, as the team lost in the semi-finals to England.

== Managerial career ==
In 2022, he served as a coach for the Slavia FC academy program in Toronto.

== Personal life ==
Arsenijević is the younger brother of fellow footballer Filip Arsenijević. Their father, Dušan, was also a footballer who played for Rad in the Yugoslav First League.

== Honours ==
Honvéd

- Magyar Kupa: 2008–09
