= Tamás Filó =

Hungarian footballer

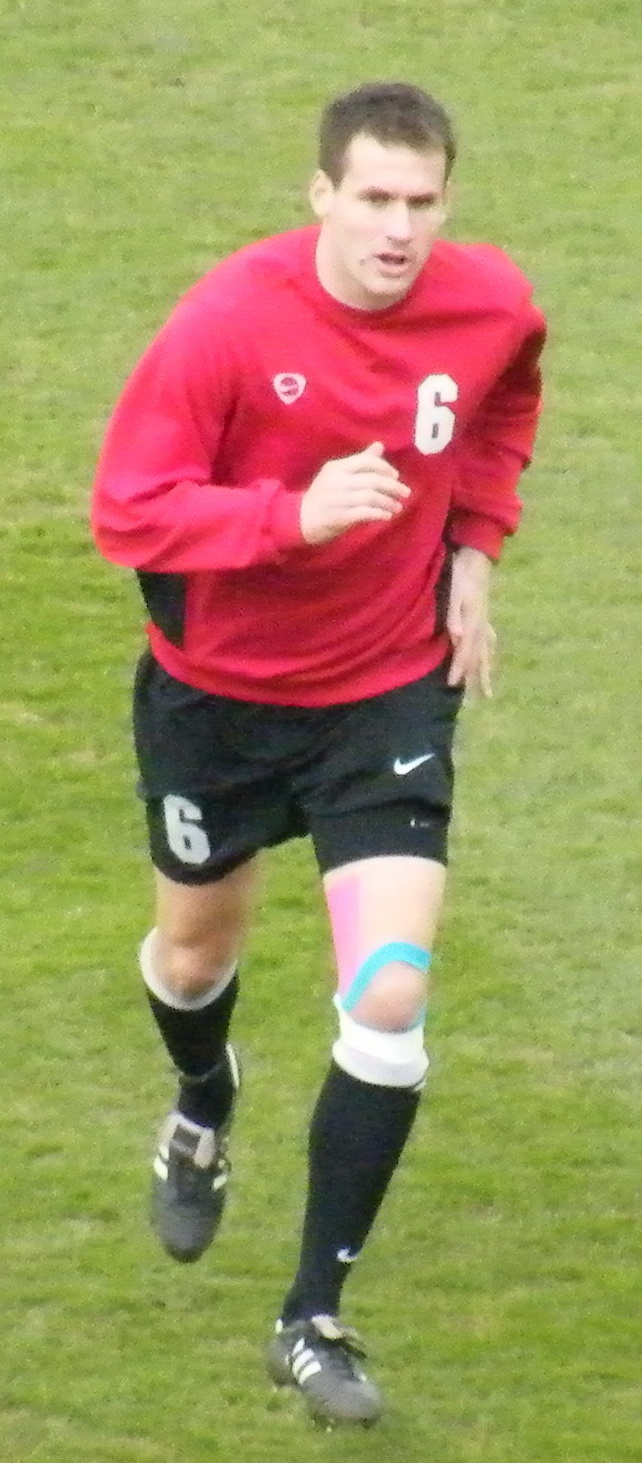

Personal information
- Full name: Tamás Filó
- Date of birth: 6 December 1979 (age 46)
- Place of birth: Budapest, Hungary
- Height: 1.88 m (6 ft 2 in)
- Position: Defender

Team information
- Current team: Budapest Honvéd FC
- Number: 6

Senior career*
Years	Team	Apps	(Gls)
- Viktória LC
- III. Kerületi TUE
- Érd
- Szigetszentmiklós
- Csepel SC
- Eger
- FC Fehérvár
- Diósgyőri VTK
- Békéscsaba 1912 Előre SE
- FC Dabas
- Budapest Honvéd FC
- * Club domestic league appearances and goals

Tamás Filó (born 6 December 1979 in Budapest) is a Hungarian football player who currently plays for Budapest Honvéd FC.
