= Paulo Albarracín =

Peruvian footballer (born 1989)

Personal information
- Full name: Paulo César Albarracín García
- Date of birth: 30 November 1989 (age 36)
- Place of birth: Callao, Peru
- Height: 1.80 m (5 ft 11 in)
- Position: Midfielder

Team information
- Current team: Academia Deportiva Cantolao
- Number: 24

Youth career
- –2008: Academia Cantolao

Senior career*
Years	Team	Apps	(Gls)
2008–2009	Budapest Honvéd		
2010–2012	Sport Boys	53	(4)
2012–2015	Alianza Lima	104	(7)
2016	Cusco	38	(1)
- * Club domestic league appearances and goals as of 27 November 2016

Paulo César Albarracín García (born 30 November 1989) is a Peruvian footballer who plays for Torneo Descentralizado club Cusco.

== Club career ==
Albarracin developed as a footballer in the popular Academia Cantolao. In January 2008 he joined Hungarian club Budapest Honvéd FC. There he made his professional debut in a league match against Újpest FC in September.

Then in January 2010 Albarracín joined his second Chalaco club Sport Boys. There he made his league debut in the Torneo Descentralizado on 28 March 2010 in matchday 7 in a derby match at home against Sporting Cristal. Manager Titín Drago included him in the starting eleven but later replaced him in the 87th minute for Junior Núñez as the match eventually finished in a 1–2 win for Cristal. In his ninth league game, he scored his first goal in the Descentralizado for matchday 16 by shooting into the upper right corner of Daniel Ferreyra's goal, but it was not enough as his side fell 2–1 away to José Gálvez FBC.
