= Balázs Rabóczki =

Hungarian footballer

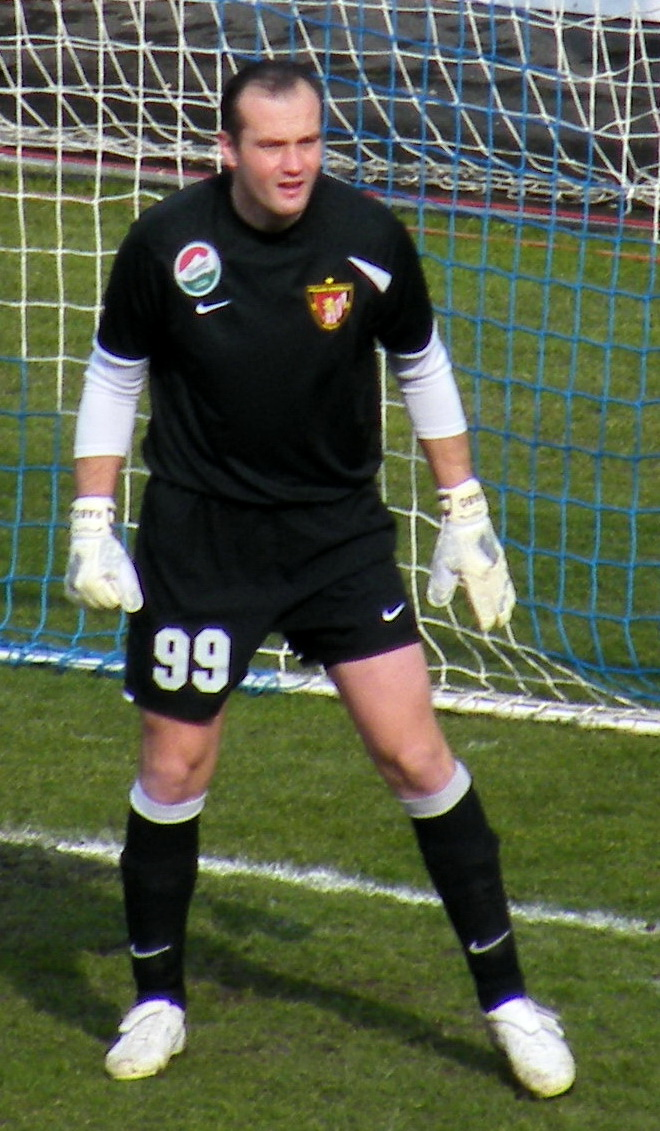

Personal information
- Date of birth: 9 January 1978 (age 48)
- Place of birth: Budapest, Hungary
- Height: 1.90 m (6 ft 3 in)
- Position: Goalkeeper

Youth career
- BVSC

Senior career*
Years	Team	Apps	(Gls)
1996–1999	MTK Hungária FC	11	(0)
1998–1999	→BKV Előre	22	(0)
1999–2001	Dunaferr SE	61	(0)
2001	SV Salzburg	0	(0)
2001	Dunaferr SE	11	(0)
2002	IFK Norrköping	26	(0)
2003–2005	FC Copenhagen	41	(0)
2006–2007	FC Sopron	28	(0)
2007–2008	Vitesse Arnhem	2	(0)
2008–2009	Budapest Honvéd	21	(0)

International career
1996–1997	Hungary U-19	7	(0)
1998–1999	Hungary U-21	3	(0)
2005	Hungary	2	(0)
- * Club domestic league appearances and goals as of 5 August 2015

Balázs Rabóczki (born 9 January 1978) is a former Hungarian football player. During his career he has been goalkeeper position. In the summer of 2009, Rabóczki ended his career.

== Club career ==
Balázs Rabóczki was a first team regular in Hungarian club Dunaferr SE, playing UEFA Champions League qualification games as well as UEFA Cup games, before joining SV Salzburg on a 3-month loan deal. Shortly after he was signed by Swedish Allsvenskan side IFK Norrköping.

=== F.C. Copenhagen ===
In January 2003, Balázs Rabóczki transferred to Danish Superliga side F.C. Copenhagen for a transfer fee of 5 million DKK, signing a 3,5-year contract and rejoining former SV Salzburg manager, Hans Backe. Rabóczki stated that the transfer was a big step forward for him, giving him the best opportunity to be selected for the Hungarian national team. Rabóczki was signed as a replacement for then F.C. Copenhagen goalkeeper, Rune Pedersen, who had turned down contract offers and eventually was sold to Italian Serie A side F.C. Modena.

During his time in Denmark, Rabóczki never established himself as the first pick goalkeeper, due to injuries, lack of stability and competent competition in the form of Magnus Kihlstedt and Benny Gall. During the end of the 2004/2005 season he did manage to secure a first team place, but the signing of Danish national team reserve and Danish Goalkeeper of the year, Jesper Christiansen, in the summer of 2005, meant that Rabóczki's days in the F.C. Copenhagen first team were numbered.

In November 2005, Rabóczki spoke out about his frustrations about the lack of first team football, stating that it was not an acceptable situation for him, as he was losing his place in the national squad. The solution came shortly after, when he transferred to Hungarian side, FC Sopron.

During his time in F.C. Copenhagen, Rabóczki played 63 games, helping to secure two Danish Superliga titles, one silver medal, a Danish cup title and the first Royal League trophy.

=== FC Sopron ===
In 2005 Rabóczki joined the team of FC Sopron where he was promised to be a member of a continuously developing team. He signed a three-year contract. After having troubles with Vízer László Máriusz, the owner of FC Sopron, Rabóczki quit the club in 2006 and joined the team of Soproni VSE, a club participating the third Hungarian league (also known as NB3). He said that while he is still looking for a new club to join, he wants to stay fit even if only by playing in a team that is in a lower league.

=== Vitesse Arnhem ===
On 18 July 2007, Rabóczki agreed to a two-year contract with Dutch Eredivisie outfit Vitesse Arnhem.

=== Budapest Honvéd FC ===
In June 2008, Rabóczki signed for Hungarian top side Budapest Honvéd FC. Rabóczki appeared with the team in the UEFA Intertoto Cup against Kazah Zhetysu, Czech Teplice and Austrian Sturm Graz.

Rabóczki retired from professional football in 2009 summer.

== Honours ==
- Danish Superliga winner: 2003 (F.C. Copenhagen), 2004 (F.C. Copenhagen)
- Danish Superliga runner-up: 2005 (F.C. Copenhagen)
- Danish Cup winner: 2004 (F.C. Copenhagen)
- Danish Super Cup winner: 2004 (F.C. Copenhagen)
- Royal League first place: 2005 (F.C. Copenhagen)
