= Davor Magoč =

Croatian footballer (born 1986)

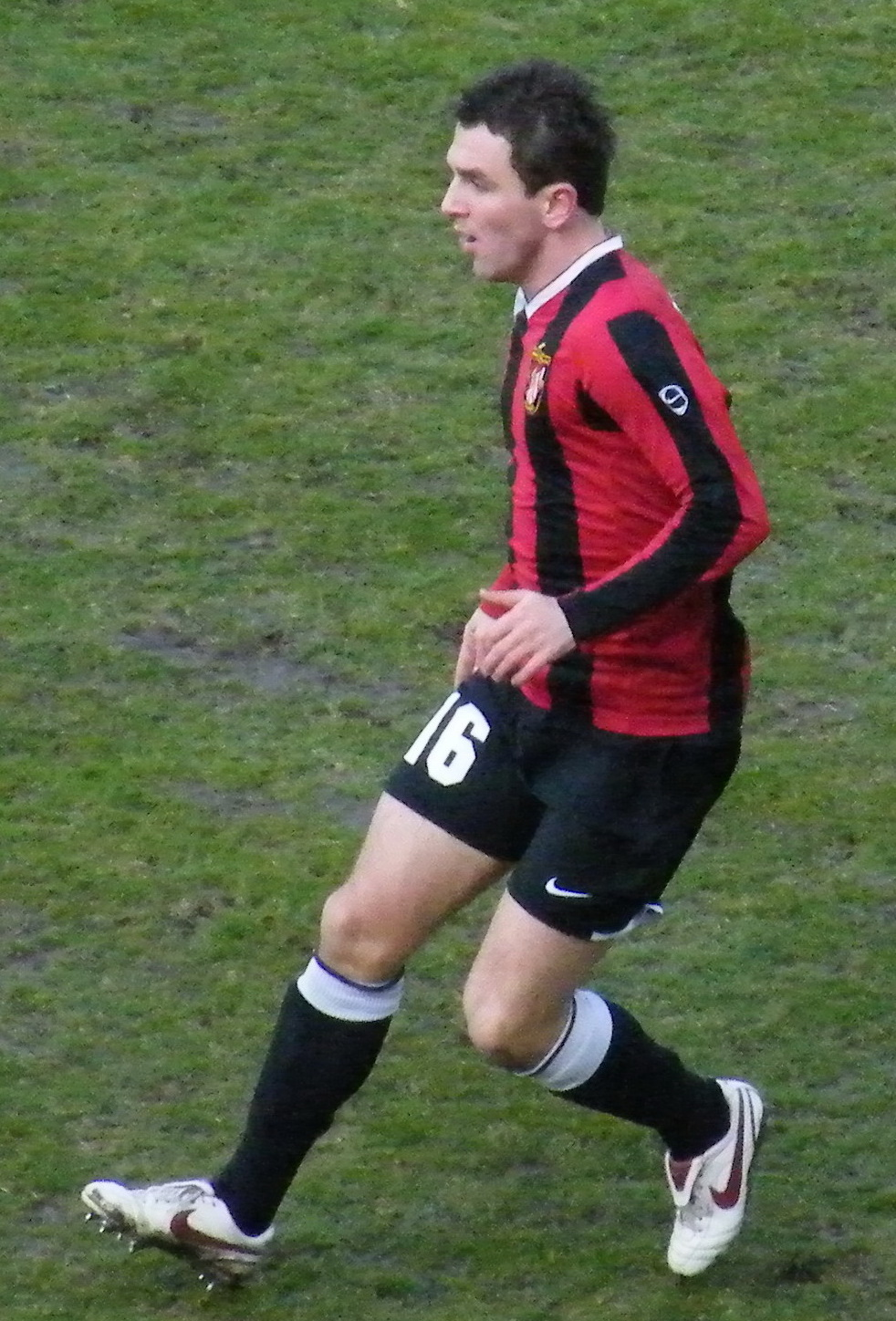

Personal information
- Date of birth: 14 May 1986 (age 40)
- Place of birth: Vukovar, SR Croatia, SFR Yugoslavia
- Height: 1.77 m (5 ft 10 in)
- Position: Defender

Senior career*
Years	Team	Apps	(Gls)
2003–2005	Vojvodina	2	(0)
2004	→ Šajkaš Kovilj (loan)	15	(0)
2005–2008	ČSK Čelarevo	81	(4)
2008–2009	Budapest Honvéd	14	(0)
2010	ČSK Čelarevo	16	(0)
2010	Stražilovo Milan Sr. Karlovci		
2011	Nordvärmlands FF		
2011–2012	RFK Novi Sad	16	(1)
2012	→ Crvena zvezda Novi Sad (loan)		
- * Club domestic league appearances and goals

Davor Magoč (born 14 May 1986) is a Croatian football midfielder.

== Club career ==
Born in Vukovar, he previously played for FK Vojvodina in the First League of Serbia and Montenegro, in Hungarian Budapest Honvéd FC and in Swedish Nordvärmlands FF.
