= George Gebro =

Liberian footballer

Personal information
- Date of birth: 13 September 1981 (age 45)
- Place of birth: Liberia
- Positions: Left-back; left midfielder

Senior career*
Years	Team	Apps	(Gls)
1998–1999	Invincible Eleven		
1999–2001	Panetolikos	32	(6)
2001–2004	Patraikos	56	(1)
2004–2005	Kerkyra	14	(0)
2005–2006	ENTHOI Lakatamia FC	23	(3)
2006–2007	AEL Limassol	15	(2)
2007–2008	Ethnikos Achna FC	3	(0)
2008–2009	Budapest Honvéd	5	(0)
2009–2010	Hapoel Petach Tikva	15	(0)
2010–2011	LISCR FC		
2012–2013	Invincible Eleven		

International career
1997–2012	Liberia	48	(1)
- * Club domestic league appearances and goals

George Gebro (born 13 September 1981) is a retired Liberian footballer.

== International career ==
He also played for the Liberia national football team and also serves on the coaching staff of the youth team.
