= Irakli Chirikashvili =

Georgian footballer

Personal information
- Full name: Irakli Chirikashvili
- Date of birth: 10 January 1987 (age 39)
- Place of birth: Georgian SSR, Soviet Union
- Height: 1.74 m (5 ft 9 in)
- Position: Midfielder

Senior career*
| Years | Team | Apps | (Gls) |
| 2003–2007 | Dinamo Tbilisi | | |
| 2007–2008 | Spartak Tskhinvali | | |
| 2008–2009 | Locomotive Tbilisi | | |
| 2009–2010 | Spartak Tskhinvali | 26 | (4) |
| 2011 | Sioni Bolnisi | 15 | (2) |
| 2011–2012 | Neuchâtel Xamax | 5 | (0) |
| 2013 | Zestaponi | | |
| 2013–2016 | Dinamo Batumi | 50 | (7) |

International career
| | Georgia U19 | 5 | (1) |
| 2005–2007 | Georgia U21 | 5 | (0) |
- * Club domestic league appearances and goals

Irakli Chirikashvili (Georgian: ირაკლი ჩირიკაშვილი; born 10 January 1987) is a Georgian former footballer who played as a midfielder.

== Career ==
Chirikashvili signed for Neuchâtel Xamax in the Swiss Super League for the 2001–12 season after a 10-day trial. He made his professional debut on 31 July 2011, coming on as a substitute for Bastien Geiger in the away match against Sion, which finished as a 0–3 home loss. After suffering an injury upon arrival, he asked to go on loan to the Swiss second division which never happened.
