= Nenad Stojaković =

Serbian footballer

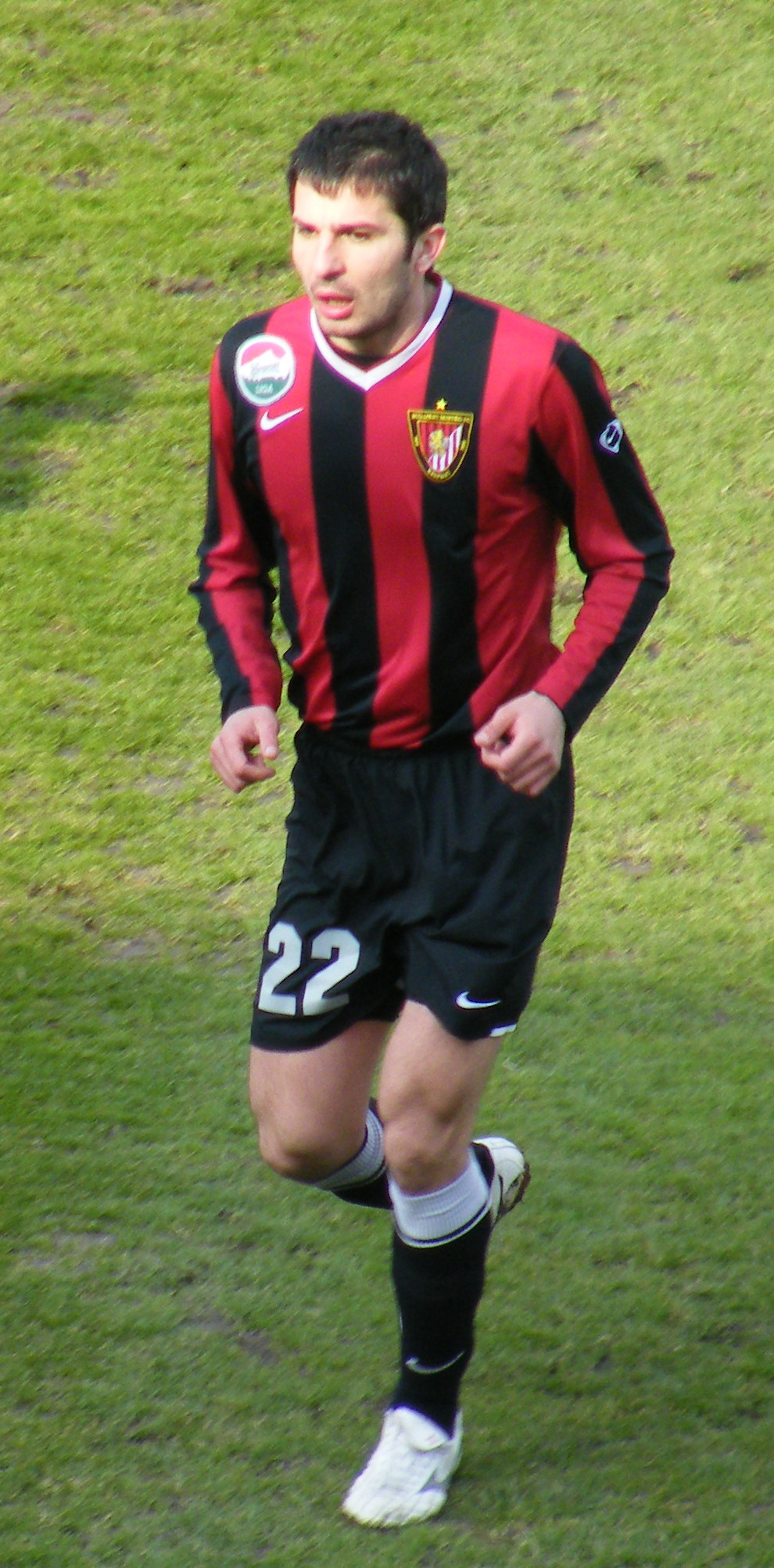
- Stojaković in 2009

Personal information
- Full name: Nenad Stojaković
- Date of birth: April 4, 1980 (age 46)
- Place of birth: Zemun, SFR Yugoslavia
- Height: 1.81 m (5 ft 11 in)
- Position: Midfielder

Youth career
- 1989–1999: Partizan

Senior career*
Years	Team	Apps	(Gls)
1999–2004	Partizan	4	(0)
2001–2002	→ Teleoptik (loan)	24	(3)
2002	→ Mogren (loan)	6	(0)
2003	→ Rudar Pljevlja (loan)	11	(0)
2003–2004	→ Rudar Ugljevik (loan)	25	(12)
2004–2005	Rad	52	(8)
2006	Budućnost Banatski Dvor	9	(1)
2006–2007	PAOK	0	(0)
2007	Shirin Faraz	6	(0)
2008	Rad	16	(2)
2008–2009	Budapest Honvéd	19	(1)
2009	Rad	11	(0)
2010	Sông Lam Nghệ An	15	(3)
2011–2012	Radnički 1923	27	(3)
2012–2013	Smederevo	6	(0)
Total		231	(33)

Managerial career
- 2019–2020: Voždovac (assistant)
- 2022–2024: Partizan (youth)
- 2024: Gorica (assistant)
- 2024–2025: Gorica
- 2025: Teleoptik
- 2025–2026: Partizan
- * Club domestic league appearances and goals

Nenad Stojaković (Serbian Cyrillic: Ненад Стојаковић; born April 4, 1980) is a Serbian football coach and former player.

During his playing career he played with Serbian clubs FK Partizan, FK Teleoptik and FK Budućnost Banatski Dvor, Montenegrin FK Mogren and FK Rudar Pljevlja, Bosnian FK Rudar Ugljevik, Greek PAOK FC, Iranian Shirin Faraz F.C., Hungarian Budapest Honvéd FC, Vietnamese Sông Lam Nghệ An and Radnički Kragujevac.

== Managerial statistics ==
As of 24 February 2026 »

Managerial record by team and tenure
Team	From	To	Record				
Team	From	To	P	W	D	L	Win %
Gorica	2024	2025	32	18	8	6	56.25
Teleoptik	28 June 2025	14 November 2025	14	11	3	0	78.57
Partizan	14 November 2025	23 February 2026	9	5	1	3	55.56
Total			55	34	12	9	61.82
