= Abass Cheikh Dieng =

Senegalese footballer

Abass Dieng
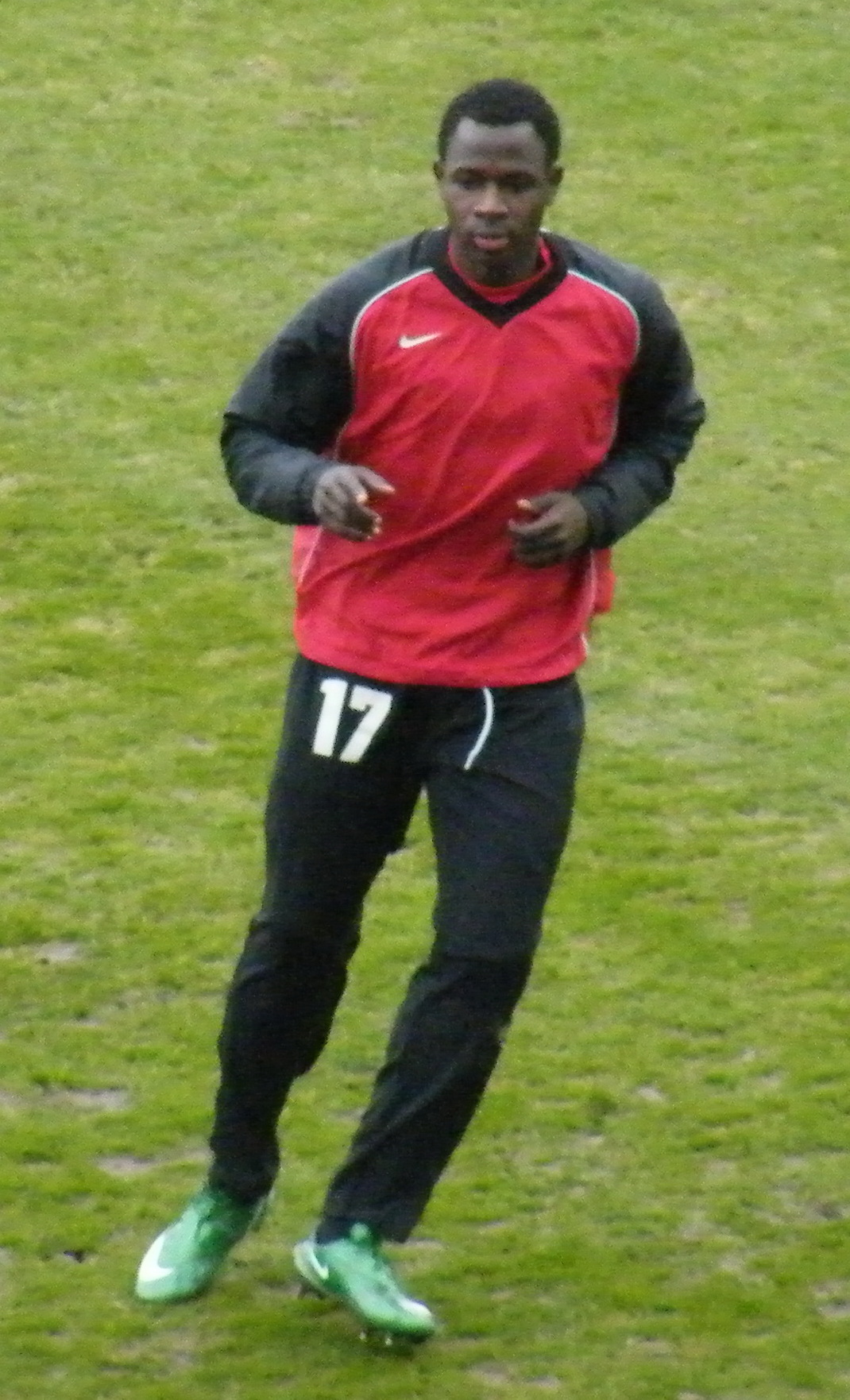

Personal information
- Full name: Abass Cheikh Dieng
- Date of birth: 1 January 1985 (age 41)
- Place of birth: Saint-Louis, Senegal
- Height: 1.82 m (5 ft 11 1/2 in)
- Position: Attacking midfielder

Youth career
- 2002–2004: Ja-Ndar-Toute

Senior career*
Years	Team	Apps	(Gls)
2004–2005	ASC Linguère		
2005–2006	Saint-Louis		
2006–2012	Budapest Honvéd	129	(17)
2011	→ Nîmes (loan)	8	(0)
2011–2012	→ Sông Lam Nghệ An (loan)	26	(10)
2013	Thanh Hóa	20	(13)
2014–2015	Becamex Bình Dương	43	(29)
- * Club domestic league appearances and goals as of 13 October 2015

Abass Cheikh Dieng (born 1 January 1985) is a retired Senegalese footballer.

== Career ==
Dieng began his career with Ja-Ndar-Toute and signed in summer 2004 for ASC Linguère. After one year with ASC Linguère signed a contract with Saint-Louis Football Center and joined in July 2006 to Budapest Honvéd FC who was in the team that reached the 3rd round of European League in 2009/2010 season. Also among the Budapest Honvéd FC team that won the 2008/2009 Cup of Hungary.

In December 2011, he moved to Vietnam and signed a contract with Sông Lam Nghệ An F.C. He also included in Sông Lam Nghệ An F.C. winning squads for 2011 Vietnamese Super Cup.

From 2014 to 2015, he played for Becamex Bình Dương and helped the team win two consecutive V.League 1 titles.

== Honours ==
=== Club ===
Budapest Honvéd

- Hungarian Cup:
  - Winner: 2006–07, 2008–09

Sông Lam Nghệ An

- Vietnamese Super Cup:
  - Winner: 2011

Becamex Bình Dương

- V.League 1:
  - Winner: 2014, 2015
- Mekong Club Championship

• Winner: 2014
