= Misheck Lungu =

Zambian footballer (born 1980)

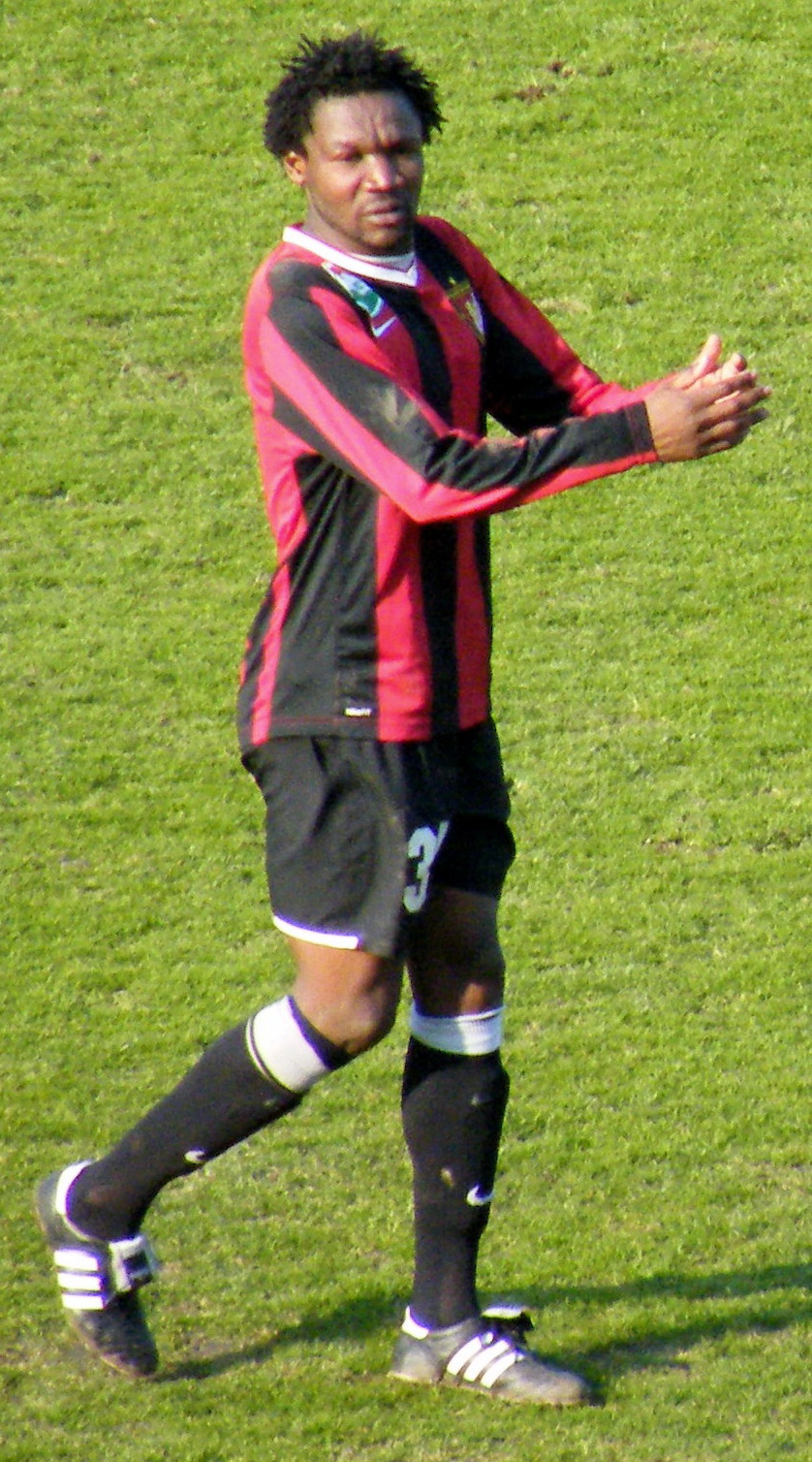

Personal information
- Date of birth: 2 May 1980 (age 46)
- Place of birth: Lusaka, Zambia
- Height: 1.78 m (5 ft 10 in)
- Position: Defender

Senior career*
Years	Team	Apps	(Gls)
1999–2001	Lusaka City Council	21	(9)
2002	Nchanga Rangers	20	(8)
2003–2004	Green Buffaloes	44	(0)
2005	1º de Agosto	14	(0)
2005–2007	Pápai FC	9	(0)
2007–2009	Kecskeméti TE	36	(1)
2009	Honvéd	11	(0)
2010–2015	Green Buffaloes		

International career
2001–2009	Zambia	37	(1)
- * Club domestic league appearances and goals

Misheck Lungu (born 2 May 1980) is a Zambian footballer.

== Club career ==
In 2009, Lungu joined Budapest Honvéd FC from Kecskeméti TE.

== International career ==
Lungu was part of the Zambian 2002 and 2006 African Nations Cup teams, who finished third in group C in the first round of competition, thus failing to secure qualification for the quarter-finals.
