= Abraham Gneki Guié =

Ivorian footballer (born 1986)

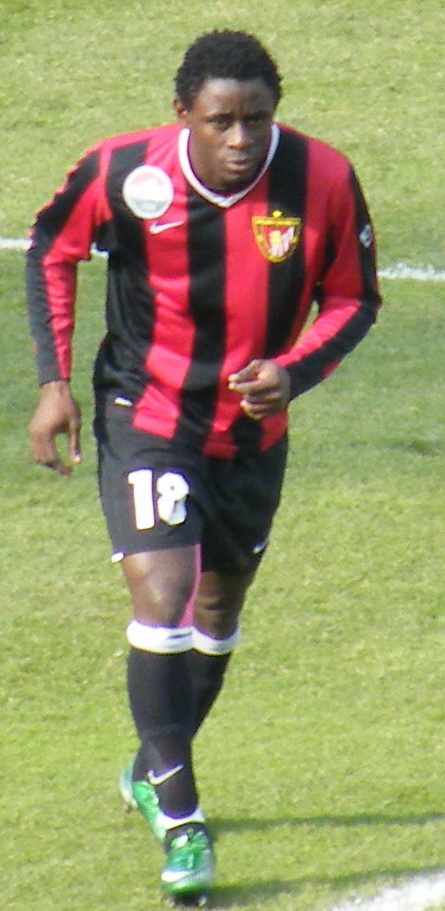

Personal information
- Full name: Abraham Gneki Guié Guié
- Date of birth: 25 July 1986 (age 40)
- Place of birth: San Pédro, Ivory Coast
- Height: 1.80 m (5 ft 11 in)
- Positions: Winger; striker

Youth career
- Dynamique Sport

Senior career*
Years	Team	Apps	(Gls)
2004–2006	Gagnoa		
2006–2007	Jomo Cosmos	2	(0)
2007–2010	Budapest Honvéd	58	(16)
2010–2011	Tours	32	(13)
2011–2014	Nice	24	(1)
2012–2013	→ Lausanne-Sport (loan)	10	(1)
2013–2014	→ Apollon Limassol (loan)	19	(7)
2014–2017	Apollon Limassol	67	(22)
2017	Orléans	2	(1)

International career
2008	Ivory Coast U23	2	(0)
2010	Ivory Coast	2	(0)
- * Club domestic league appearances and goals

Abraham Gneki Guié Guié (born 25 July 1986) is an Ivorian former professional footballer who played as a winger or striker.

== Club career ==
Guié played for Jomo Cosmos in the South African Premier Soccer League. He was in the Budapest Honvéd FC team that reached the third round of European League in 2009–10 season and was a member of the team that won the 2008–09 Cup of Hungary.

In the summer of 2010, he signed for Tours FC, in the French second division. In the first 17 matches with the French club, he found the net 10 times.

In June 2014, after spending the previous season with Apollon Limassol on loan from OGC Nice, Guié Guié was sold to the Cypriot club.

In October 2017, he announced his retirement due a heart problem.

== International career ==
Guié was a striker who played for the Ivory Coast U23 at the 2008 Summer Olympics in China. He was capped twice for Ivory Coast in 2010, playing against Rwanda and Burundi.

== Honours ==
Budapest Honvéd

- Hungarian Cup: 2006–07, 2008–09; runners-up 2007–08
- Hungarian Super Cup runners-up: 2007, 2009

Apollon Limassol

- Cyprus Cup: 2015–16, 2016-2017
