= Ruslan Mikhaylov =

Russian footballer

Personal information
- Full name: Ruslan Andreyevich Mikhaylov
- Date of birth: 22 February 1979 (age 47)
- Place of birth: Gayduk, Russian SFSR
- Height: 1.72 m (5 ft 8 in)
- Position: Midfielder

Senior career*
Years	Team	Apps	(Gls)
1997	Dynamo-d Stavropol	21	(2)
2000–2001	Spartak-Kavkaztransgaz Izobilny	55	(2)
2003–2004	Volochanin-Ratmir Vyshny Volochyok	54	(9)
2005	Lokomotiv-NN Nizhny Novgorod	29	(3)
2006	Vostok	11	(2)
2006	Volga Tver	12	(0)
2007	Volochanin-Ratmir Vyshny Volochyok	13	(1)
2007–2008	FC Zhetysu	14	(2)
2008	Metallurg Lipetsk	3	(0)
2009	Stavropolye-2009	11	(1)
2009–2010	Volga Tver	36	(2)
- * Club domestic league appearances and goals

Ruslan Andreyevich Mikhaylov (Russian: Руслан Андреевич Михайлов; born 22 February 1979) is a former Russian professional footballer.
