= Vladislav Kiselyov =

Russian footballer

Personal information
- Full name: Vladislav Vladimirovich Kiselyov
- Date of birth: 12 October 1980 (age 46)
- Place of birth: Leningrad, Russian SFSR
- Height: 1.80 m (5 ft 11 in)
- Position: Midfielder

Youth career
- DYuSSh Smena-Zenit

Senior career*
Years	Team	Apps	(Gls)
1998–1999	FC Ladoga Kirovsk		
2000–2001	FC Dynamo Saint Petersburg	37	(2)
2002	FC BSK Spirovo	35	(5)
2003	FC Dynamo Saint Petersburg	0	(0)
2003	FC Spartak Lukhovitsy	11	(1)
2004–2005	FC Petrotrest Saint Petersburg	59	(7)
2006–2007	FC Okzhetpes	34	(3)
2007	FC Aktobe-Lento	3	(1)
2008	FC Zhetysu	16	(1)
2009	FC Ruan Tosno		
2010	FC Izhora-GMR Ivanovka		
2011–2012	FC Sever Murmansk	42	(11)
2014	FC Favorit Vyborg		
- * Club domestic league appearances and goals

Vladislav Vladimirovich Kiselyov (Russian: Владислав Владимирович Киселёв; born 12 October 1980) is a former Russian professional footballer.

== Club career ==
He played in the Russian Football National League for FC Petrotrest Saint Petersburg in 2005. He then played 3 seasons in the Kazakhstan Premier League.
