= Zoltán Hercegfalvi =

Hungarian footballer

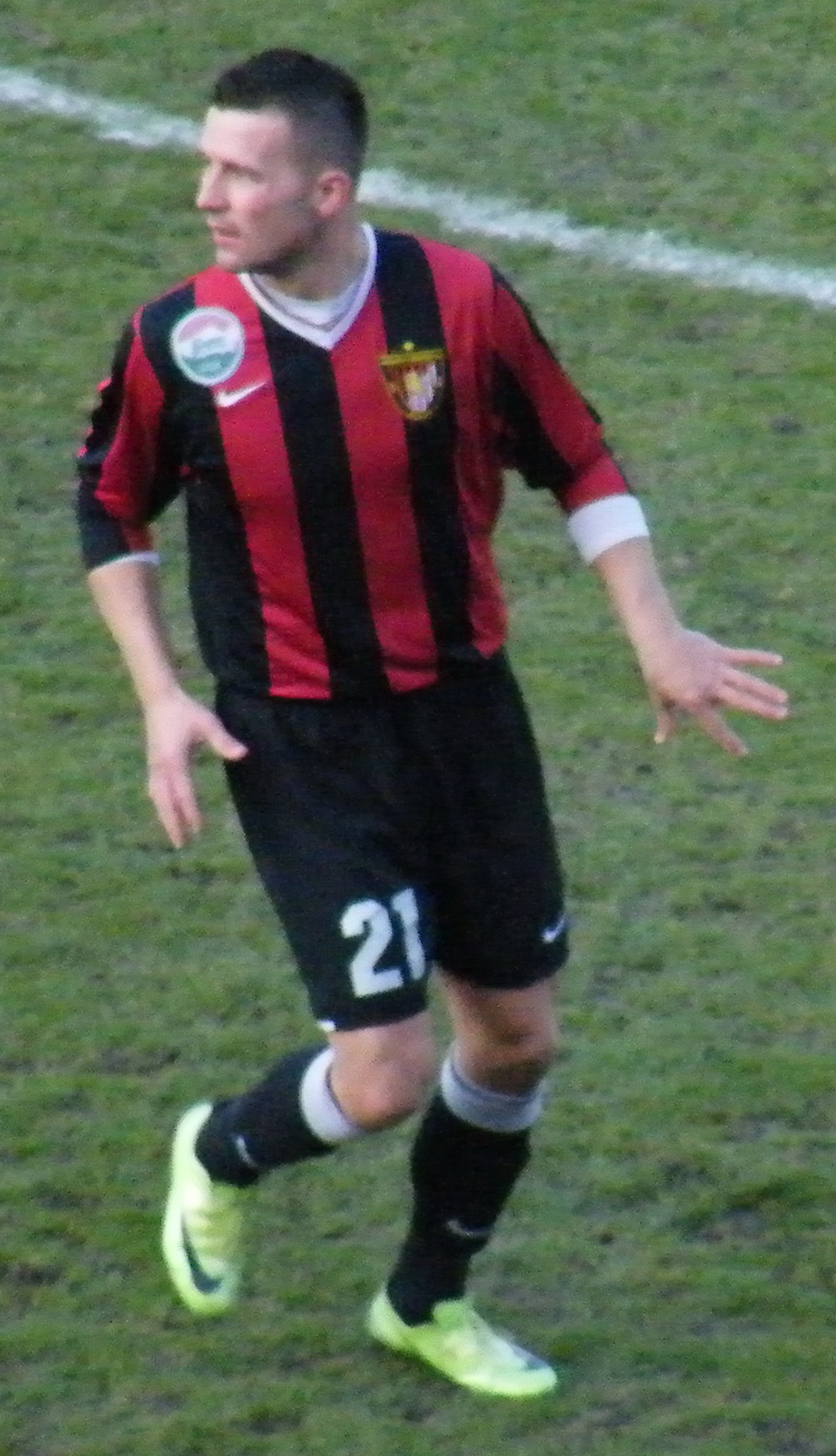

Personal information
- Date of birth: 31 December 1979 (age 46)
- Place of birth: Budapest, Hungary
- Height: 5 ft 11 in (1.80 m)
- Position: Forward

Youth career
- 1985–1998: Budapest Honvéd

Senior career*
Years	Team	Apps	(Gls)
1998–2003	Budapest Honvéd	72	(11)
2003–2004	Videoton FC Fehérvár	42	(12)
2004–2005	Lombard-Pápa TFC	24	(3)
2005–2006	Slavia Prague	9	(0)
2006–2009	Budapest Honvéd	79	(27)
2009–2010	Kansas City Wizards	10	(2)
2011–2012	Budapest Honvéd FC II	7	(0)
2012	Vasas SC	7	(0)

International career^{‡}
2003–2004	Hungary	3	(0)
- * Club domestic league appearances and goals as of 22 April 2012 ‡ National team caps and goals as of 5 April 2009

Zoltán Hercegfalvi (born 31 December 1979 in Budapest) is a Hungarian footballer.

== Career ==
=== Club ===
Hercegfalvi joined the youth academy of storied Hungarian team Honvéd at the age of 6, and played all the way through their system before making his first team appearance in 1998. He played at Honvéd until 2003, and subsequently enjoyed stints with rivals Videoton Székesfehérvár, Lombard-Pápa TFC, and Czech side Slavia Prague, before rejoining Honvéd in 2006. In total, Hercegfalvi spent more than 20 years at Honvéd, and made over 150 appearances for the club.

He won the Hungarian Cup with Honvéd in 2007 and played in the UEFA Intertoto Cup with Székesfehérvár in 2003, with Lombard-Pápa in 2005, and with Honvéd in 2008.

Hercegfalvi joined the Kansas City Wizards on 28 July 2009. Hercegfalvi missed most of the 2010 season due to a torn ACL suffered in a 2–1 friendly win over AC St. Louis and was released at the conclusion of the 2010 season.

=== International ===
Hercegfalvi has also appeared three times for the Hungary national football team.
