= Biatorbágyi SE =

Hungarian football club

- Full name: Biatorbágyi Sport Egyesület
- Founded: 1903; 123 years ago
Home colours	Away colours

Biatorbágyi Sport Egyesület is a professional football club based in Biatorbágy, Pest County, Hungary. The club competes in the Pest county league.

== Name changes ==
- 1903: establishment
- 1962: fusion of Biai SE and Torbágyi KSK
- 1962-1989: Biatorbágyi SE
- 1989–present: Viadukt SE Biatorbágy
