= 2008–09 Magyar Kupa =

Tournament details
- Country: Hungary

Final positions
- Champions: Budapest Honvéd (7th title)
- Runners-up: Győr

The 2008–09 Magyar Kupa was the sixty-ninth season of Hungary's annual knock-out cup competition. It started with the first games of Round 1 on 2 August 2008 and ended with the final held on 26 May 2009. The winners earned a place in the third qualifying round of the UEFA Europa League. Debreceni VSC were the defending champions.

== First round ==
Games were played between 2 and 13 August 2008.

Home team	Score	Away team
Sarkadkeresztúri SE	2–1	Ebesi KSE
Devecser SE	0–2	Celldömölki VSE
AEK Beloiannisz FC	0–2	FC Dabas
Szécsény VSE	3–2	Gyöngyösi AK
Berkenye SE	0–5	Újpest FC II
Tiszakóród SE	1–18	Debreceni VSC II
Kerámia SE Tófej	3–1	Balatonberényi SE
Csongrád TSE	2–0	Kiskunfélegyházi TK
Bodrogkisfaludi SÉE	3–2	Nagyecsed RSE
Lipót SE	7–1	Móri SE
Várbalog KSK	1–1 (aet), 4–2 (p)	Vépi KSE
Buzsák KSE	0–4	Nagykanizsa TE 1866 MÁV
Dunaharaszti MTK	1–1 (aet), 7–6 (p)	MTK Hungária II
Kaposszerdahely KSE	0–4	Szentlőrinc SE
Kishárságy SE	1–19	Bajai LSE
Putnok VSE	1–2 (aet)	Salgótarján–Baglyasalja
Ladánybenei FC	2–3 (aet)	Százhalombattai LK
Dány KSK	0–5	III. Kerületi TUE
Kótaj SE	2–1 (aet)	Kemecse SE
Balatonfüredi FC	0–4	FC Fehérvár II
Biatorbágyi SE	1–1 (aet), 5–3 (p)	Budapest Honvéd II
Nagytétényi SE	0–2	Tura VSK
Újszászi VVSE	3–2	Monori SE
Sülysáp KSK	1–0	Jászapáti VSE
Túrkevei VSE	2–0	Méhkeréki SE
Gönyü SE	1–10	VFC P2 Sport
Mezősas SE	1–5	Békéscsaba Előre
Zalalövő TK	2–4	Rum KSC
Pálhalma	2–4	Szigetszentmiklósi TK

Home team	Score	Away team
Soproni VSE	2–1	Sárvári FC
Zalahalápi SE	0–6	Gránit Gyógyfürdő SE
Nyírkarászi KSE	2–3	Nyírtelek SE
Dombrád SE	3–0	Sárospataki TC
Tiszapalkonyai SE	0–0 (aet), 4–2 (p)	Ajak SE
Sajókaza SE	2–3	Egri FC
Kisteleki TE	0–0 (aet), 1–3 (p)	Kiskőrösi LC
Alsóőrs SE	3–1	Tamási SE
Kovácshida SE	1–3	Szekszárdi UFC
Majsi Táncsics SE	0–3	Decsi SK
Fertőszentmiklós SE	2–1	Bük TK
Ikrény SE	0–8	Bicskei TC
Gyorszemere KSK	3–2	Környe SE
Andráshida SC	3–0	Csörötnek KSK
Szentgál Senior SE	2–1	Zalaszentmihály SE
Csabrendek FC	4–3	Vasszécsény SE
Kovágószőlősi SE	0–3	Kaposvári Rákóczi II
Tabak SE Tokodaltáró	1–2	KSE Karancslapujtő
Börcs KSK	4–1	Komárom VSE
Leányfalu SE	3–2	Nagybátonyi SC
MP–WIDENTA Romhány	1–3	Rákospalotai EAC II
Bogács KSK	0–2	Pétervására SE
AGFS Páterdomb	1–2	Balatonszárszó NSE
Abaújszántó KSE	1–3	Várda SE
TGT–Tomor–LAK KSE	4–1	Tiszabecs LC
Hajósi FC	2–10	Paksi SE II
Harkakötönyi TSE	1–7	Algyő SK
PTE-PEAC	3–4	Nagybajomi AC
Felsőtárkány SC	1–3	Ózdi FC

== Second round ==
Games were played between 19 and 28 August 2008.

Home team	Score	Away team
Szekszárdi UFC	3–4	Pécsi Mecsek FC
Tura VSK	7–1	Százhalombattai LK
Csabrendek FC	1–2	Mosonmagyaróvári TE
Szigetszentmiklósi TK	1–0	Újpest FC II
Bicskei TC	1–2	Integrál-DAC
Nyírtelek SE	3–0	TGT–Tomor–Lak KSE
Dunaharaszti MTK	2–1	Budaörsi SC
III. Kerületi TUE	4–1	Tököl KSK
Soroksár SC	1–2	Vecsési FC
Rákospalotai EAC II	2–0	Vác-Újbuda LTC
KSE Karancslapujtő	0–6	Kazincbarcikai SC
Mezőkövesdi SE	0–0 (aet), 4–2 (p)	Baktalórántháza VSE
Tiszapalkonyai SE	1–2 (aet)	Várda SE
Bodrogkisfaludi SÉE	0–3	Tuzsér SE
Túrkevei VSE	1–3	Békéscsaba Előre
Kiskőrösi FC	2–3	Algyő SK
Decs KSE	3–2	Komlói Bányász
Andráshida SC	3–2	Nagybajomi AC
Börcs KSK	0–3	Viadukt-SE Biatorbágy
Várbalog KSK	0–7	Celldömölki VSE
Sülysáp KSK	0–2	Jászberényi SE
Szentlőrinc SE	3–0	Paksi SE II

Home team	Score	Away team
Sarkadkeresztúri SE	0–5	Makói FC
Szécsény VSE	4–2	Ózd FC
FC Dabas	2–1	BKV Előre SC
Kótaj SE	1–3	Bőcs KSC
Bajai LSE	0–1	Kozármisleny SE
Gyirmót SE	1–4	Lombard-Pápa TFC
Szolnoki MÁV FC	3–2	Ceglédi VSE
Lipót SE	1–1 (aet), 3–5 (p)	FC Tatabánya
Rum KSC	3–0	Fertőszentmiklós SE
Nagykanizsa TE 1866 MÁV	4–3	Kaposvölgye VSC
Gránit Gyógyfürdő SE	1–0	Kaposvári Rákóczi II
Kerámia SE Tófej	1–6	Barcsi SC
Alsóőrs SE	0–5	FC Fehérvár II
Szentgál Senior SE	0–4	Dunaújváros FC
Dombrád SE	3–5	Debreceni VSC II
Pétervására SE	1–2	Salgótarján-Baglyasalja FC
Soproni VSE	1–0	FC Ajka
Balatonszárszó NSE	2–4	VFC P2 Sport
Győrszemere KSK	3–8	FC Felcsút
Újszászi VVSE	3–0	Egri FC
Csongrád TSE	0–3	Orosháza FC
Leányfalu SE	0–9	Ferencvárosi TC

Bye: Erzsébeti Spartacus MTK LE

== Third round ==
Games were played between 2 and 4 September 2008.

Team 1	Score	Team 2
Tuzsér	1–1 (aet), 4–3 (p)	Mezőkövesd
Mosonmagyaróvári TE	2–4	Lombard-Pápa TFC
VFC P2 Sport	2–1	Zalaegerszeg
Rum KSC	3–1	Nagykanizsa TE MÁV
Andráshida SC	0–1	Kaposvári Rákóczi
Gránit Gyógyfürdõ SE	1–0	Barcsi SC
Decs KSE	1–4	Pécsi Mecsek FC
Algyő SK	1–0	Orosháza
Viadukt-SE Biatorbágy	3–4	Dunaújváros
Rákospalotai EAC II	1–3	FC Fehérvár II
Dunaharaszti MTK	2–4	Vasas SC
Várda SE	1–5	Debreceni VSC
Újszászi VVSE	5–1	Szécsény VSE
Celldömölki VSE	2–1	Soproni VSE
Erzsébeti Spartacus MTK LE	4–3	Szolnoki MÁV FC
Makó FC	1–0	Békéscsaba Előre
Integrál-DAC	0–1	Szombathelyi Haladás
FC Tatabánya	0–3	FC Fehérvár
Kozármisleny SE	1–0	Paksi FC
Bőcs KSC	1–0	Nyíregyháza Spartacus
Jászberényi SE	1–3	Kecskeméti TE
FC Dabas	0–6	Rákospalotai EAC
Salgótarján-Baglyasalja	0–1	Kazincbarcikai SC
Vecsési FC	1–1 (aet), 3–5 (p)	Újpest FC
Nyírtelek SE	2–5	Diósgyőri VTK
III. Kerületi TUE	2–5	FC Felcsút
Tura VSK	1–2 (aet)	Budapest Honvéd
Szigetszentmiklósi TK	1–1 (aet), 2–3 (p)	Ferencvárosi TC
Szentlőrinc SE	0–0 (aet), 0–2 (p)	BFC Siófok

== Round of 32 ==
Games were played between 17 and 25 September 2008.

Team 1	Score	Team 2
Algyő SK	1–10	Debreceni VSC
Erzsébeti Spartacus MTK LE	0–4	Kecskeméti TE
Kozármisleny SE	2–2 (aet), 1–4 (p)	MTK Hungária
FC Felcsút	1–1 (aet), 4–5 (p)	FC Fehérvár
Makó FC	1–0	Diósgyőri VTK
Debreceni VSC II	0–1	Budapest Honvéd
Kazincbarcikai SC	2–1	Vasas SC
FC Fehérvár II	4–0	VFC P2 Sport
Dunaújváros FC	1–1 (aet), 6–7 (p)	Bőcs KSC
Celldömölki VSE	0–4	Lombard-Pápa TFC
Tuzsér SE	1–2	Újpest FC
Gránit Gyógyfürdő SE	0–6	Kaposvári Rákóczi
Rum KSC	0–3	BFC Siófok
Újszászi VVSE	0–3	Rákospalotai EAC
Pécsi Mecsek FC	0–3	Győri ETO FC
Ferencvárosi TC	1–2	Szombathelyi Haladás

== Round of 16 ==
The first legs were played between 8 and 10 October 2008. The second legs were played on 21 and 22 October 2008.

Team 1	Agg.	Team 2	1st leg	2nd leg
FC Fehérvár II	1–8	BFC Siófok	0–4	1–4
Makó FC	1–5	Budapest Honvéd	0–2	1–3
Kazincbarcikai SC	3–1	Lombard-Pápa TFC	2–0	1–1
Kaposvári Rákóczi	3–10	MTK Hungária	2–4	1–6
Kecskeméti TE	(a) 3–3	Rákospalotai EAC	1–1	2–2 (aet)
Bőcs KSC	0–10	Újpest FC	0–3	0–7
FC Fehérvár	2–2 (a)	Debreceni VSC	2–1	0–1
Szombathelyi Haladás	3–6	Győri ETO FC	3–2	0–4

== Quarter-finals ==
The first legs were played on 10 and 11 March 2009 and the second legs were played on 17 and 18 March 2009.

Team 1	Agg.	Team 2	1st leg	2nd leg
MTK Hungária	(a) 4–4	Újpest FC	1–2	3–2
Kazincbarcikai SC	1–9	Győri ETO FC	1–2	0–7
BFC Siófok	3–1	Debreceni VSC	2–0	1–1
Budapest Honvéd	6–1	Kecskeméti TE	2–0	4–1

== Semi-finals ==
The first legs were played on 14 and 15 April 2009 and the second legs were played on 21 and 22 April 2009.

Team 1	Agg.	Team 2	1st leg	2nd leg
Győr	4–3	MTK Hungária	2–1	2–2
Siófok	3–4	Budapest Honvéd	1–2	2–2

== Final ==
20 May 2009
18:00 (UTC+2)

Győr	0–1	Budapest Honvéd
	Report	Abraham 71'

ETO Park, Győr
Attendance: 11,000
Referee: Zsolt Szabó

26 May 2009
19:00 (UTC+2)

Budapest Honvéd	0–0	Győr
Benjamin (red card) 83'	Report	Šupić (red card) 63'

Bozsik József Stadion, Budapest
Attendance: 7,000
Referee: Péter Solymosi

Budapest Honvéd won 1–0 on aggregate

== See also ==
- 2008–09 Nemzeti Bajnokság I
- 2008–09 Nemzeti Bajnokság II
- 2008–09 Nemzeti Bajnokság III
