= 2009–10 Neftchi Baku PFK season =

Neftchi Baku
2009–10 season
- Chairman: Sadyg Sadygov
- Manager: Boyukaga Aghayev until 16 September 2009; Vagif Sadygov from 29 September 2009 until 21 February 2010; Arif Asadov from 25 February 2010
- Stadium: Tofik Bakhramov Stadium, Ismat Gayibov Stadium
- Premier League: 5th
- Azerbaijan Cup: Quarter-finals vs Inter Baku
- Top goalscorer: League: Adrian Neaga (11); All: Adrian Neaga (11)
- Highest home attendance: 4,000 vs Khazar Lankaran; 9 February 2010
- Lowest home attendance: 300 vs Baku; 17 February 2010
- Average home league attendance: 1,566
| Home colours | Away colours |

The 2009–10 season is Neftchi Baku's eighteenth Azerbaijan Premier League season. They started the season under the management of Boyukaga Aghayev before he left by mutual consent in mid September. Aghayev was replaced by Vagif Sadygov, who lasted 5 months before being sacked in mid February and replaced by Arif Asadov.

== Squad ==
Note: Flags indicate national team as defined under FIFA eligibility rules; some limited exceptions apply. Players may hold more than one non-FIFA nationality.

| No. | Pos. | Nation | Player |
|---|---|---|---|
| 1 | GK | SRB | Vladimir Mićović |
| 2 | DF | AZE | Rail Malikov |
| 3 | DF | TUR | Suat Usta |
| 4 | DF | EST | Taavi Rähn |
| 5 | MF | ROU | Leonard Naidin |
| 6 | MF | AZE | Eshgin Guliyev |
| 7 | FW | AZE | Samir Aliyev |
| 8 | MF | AZE | Elmar Bakhshiev |
| 9 | FW | URU | Walter Guglielmone |
| 10 | MF | ROU | Marian Aliuță |
| 11 | MF | AZE | Javid Huseynov |
| 12 | GK | LTU | Paulius Grybauskas |
| 15 | DF | AZE | Ruslan Abishov |
| 16 | DF | EST | Dmitri Kruglov |
| 17 | MF | AZE | Araz Abdullayev |

| No. | Pos. | Nation | Player |
|---|---|---|---|
| 18 | DF | AZE | Ruslan Amirjanov |
| 20 | FW | BRA | José Carlos |
| 22 | MF | AZE | Zaur Tagizade |
| 23 | DF | AZE | Tural Narimanov |
| 25 | FW | ROU | Adrian Neaga |
| 26 | MF | TKM | Nazar Baýramow |
| 27 | MF | AZE | Rashad Abdullayev |
| 28 | FW | AZE | Amit Guluzade |
| 30 | FW | CMR | Valentine Atem |
| 44 | DF | GEO | Valeri Abramidze |
| 89 | GK | AZE | Elchin Sadygov |
| — | DF | AZE | Tärlän Quliyev |
| — | MF | AZE | Mirhuseyn Seyidov |
| — | FW | EST | Vladimir Voskoboinikov |

== Transfers ==
=== Summer ===
In: Note: Flags indicate national team as defined under FIFA eligibility rules; some limited exceptions apply. Players may hold more than one non-FIFA nationality.

| No. | Pos. | Nation | Player |
|---|---|---|---|
| 4 | DF | EST | Taavi Rähn (from (Lithuania) FK Ekranas) |
| 5 | MF | ROU | Leonard Naidin (from (Romania) Politehnica Iaşi) |
| 9 | FW | URU | Walter Guglielmone (from (Azerbaijan) Inter Baku) |
| 12 | GK | LTU | Paulius Grybauskas (from (Romania) Oţelul Galaţi) |
| 14 | DF | EST | Andrei Stepanov (from (England) Watford) |
| 23 | DF | AZE | Tural Narimanov (loan return from (Azerbaijan) FK Karvan) |

Out: Note: Flags indicate national team as defined under FIFA eligibility rules; some limited exceptions apply. Players may hold more than one non-FIFA nationality.

| No. | Pos. | Nation | Player |
|---|---|---|---|
| — | DF | AZE | Elnur Allahverdiyev (to (Azerbaijan) Qarabağ) |
| — | DF | AUS | John Tambouras (to (Australia) North Queensland Fury) |
| — | DF | IRL | Joe Kendrick (to (Republic of Ireland) Sligo Rovers) |
| — | DF | UKR | Volodymyr Olefir (to (Ukraine) Oleksandriya) |
| — | MF | UKR | Oleh Herasymyuk (to (Ukraine) Dynamo-2 Kyiv) |
| — | MF | BUL | Marcho Dafchev (to (Bulgaria) Lokomotiv Sofia) |
| — | MF | BUL | Svetoslav Petrov (to (Bulgaria) CSKA Sofia) |
| — | FW | AZE | Asif Mammadov (to (Azerbaijan) Inter Baku) |

=== Winter ===
In: Note: Flags indicate national team as defined under FIFA eligibility rules; some limited exceptions apply. Players may hold more than one non-FIFA nationality.

| No. | Pos. | Nation | Player |
|---|---|---|---|
| 11 | MF | AZE | Javid Huseynov (from (Azerbaijan) Inter Baku) |
| 44 | DF | GEO | Valeri Abramidze (from (Russia) Dynamo Barnaul) |
| — | FW | EST | Vladimir Voskoboinikov (from (Russia) Luch-Energiya) |

Out: Note: Flags indicate national team as defined under FIFA eligibility rules; some limited exceptions apply. Players may hold more than one non-FIFA nationality.

| No. | Pos. | Nation | Player |
|---|---|---|---|
| 14 | DF | EST | Andrei Stepanov (to (Russia) Khimki) |

== Competitions ==
=== Azerbaijan Premier League ===
==== Results ====
| 16 August 2009 1 | Olimpik-Shuvalan | 0 - 1 | Neftchi Baku | Shafa Stadium |
| 20:00 AZST (UTC+5) | Camara (yellow card) 70' (yellow-red card) 70' | Summary | Naidin 10' | Attendance: 800; Referee: Vusal Aliyev |

| 22 August 2009 2 | Neftchi Baku | 2 - 0 | Turan Tovuz | Tofik Bakhramov Stadium |
| 13:30 AZST (UTC+5) | Neaga 3' (pen.); Guglielmone 43' (pen.) | Summary | | Attendance: 1,500; Referee: Anar Salmanov |

| 13 September 2009 3 | Neftchi Baku | 0 - 2 | Mughan | Tofik Bakhramov Stadium |
| 17:00 AZST (UTC+5) | | Summary | Huseynov 39'; Ćulov 41' | Attendance: 1,500; Referee: Vusal Aliyev |

| 19 September 2009 4 | Standard | 1 - 2 | Neftchi Baku | Mehdi Huseynzade Stadium |
| 17:00 AZST (UTC+5) | Guliyev 48'; Huseynov (yellow card) 3' (yellow-red card) 52' | Summary | R.Abdullayev 25'; Usta (yellow card) 45' (yellow-red card) 58'; Neaga 90+1' | Attendance: 1,000; Referee: Rovshan Ahmadov |

| 27 September 2009 5 | Neftchi Baku | 0 - 1 | Simurq | Tofik Bakhramov Stadium |
| 16:15 AZST (UTC+5) | | Summary | Sokolov 24' | Attendance: 700; Referee: Fariz Yusifov |

| 18 October 2009 6 | Qarabağ | 1 - 0 | Neftchi Baku | Baku^{2} |
| 16:15 AZST (UTC+5) | Javadov 40' | Summary | | Stadium: Tofiq Bahramov Stadium; Attendance: 1,000; Referee: Azad Mutallimov |

| 21 October 2009 7 | Gabala | 1 - 0 | Neftchi Baku | Gabala City Stadium |
| 16:00 AZST (UTC+5) | Torres 80' | Summary | | Attendance: 1,500; Referee: Fariz Yusifov |

| 25 October 2009 8 | Baku | 0 - 2 | Neftchi Baku | Tofig Bakhramov Stadium |
| 16:10 AZST (UTC+5) | | Summary | Neaga 73'; Aliuță 88' | Attendance: 300; Referee: Anar Salmanov |

| 1 November 2009 9 | Neftchi Baku | 1 - 0 | FK Karvan | Tofik Bakhramov Stadium |
| 14:30 AZT (UTC+4) | Kruglov 17' | Summary | | Attendance: 750; Referee: Elchin Mämmädov |

| 8 November 2009 10 | Khazar Lankaran | 0 - 0 | Neftchi Baku | Lankaran City Stadium |
| 17:00 AZT (UTC+4) | | Summary | | Attendance: 12,000; Referee: Rovshan Ahmadov |

| 22 November 2009 11 | Neftchi Baku | 2 - 1 | Inter Baku | Tofik Bakhramov Stadium |
| 14:00 AZT (UTC+4) | Guglielmone 21'; Aliyev 76' | Summary | Poškus 66'; Shukurov (yellow card) 5' (yellow-red card) 90' | Attendance: 1,500; Referee: Vusal Aliyev |

| 29 November 2009 12 | Neftchi Baku | 0 - 0 | Olimpik-Shuvalan | Tofik Bakhramov Stadium |
| 14:00 AZT (UTC+4) | | Summary | | Attendance: 500; Referee: Rovshan Ahmadov |

| 5 December 2009 13 | Turan Tovuz | 2 - 3 | Neftchi Baku | Tovuz City Stadium |
| 14:00 AZT (UTC+4) | Khromtsov 23'; Tagiyev 26' | Summary | Neaga 56', 86'; Atem 82' | Attendance: 2,000; Referee: Afgan Hamzayev |

| 10 December 2009 14 | Neftchi Baku | 1 - 1 | Gabala | Tofik Bakhramov Stadium |
| 14:00 AZT (UTC+4) | Malikov 65' | Summary | Huseynov 73'; Aliyev (yellow card) 64' (yellow-red card) 90+2' | Attendance: 500; Referee: Rovshan Ahmadov |

| 13 December 2009 15 | Mughan | 2 - 2 | Neftchi Baku | Salyan Olympic Sport Complex Stadium |
| 14:00 AZT (UTC+4) | Adilović 40'; Hodžić 67'; Novruzov (yellow card) 30' (yellow-red card) 73' | Summary | Neaga 17' (pen.); Aliuță 86' | Attendance: 600; Referee: Vusal Aliyev |

| 20 December 2009 16 | Neftchi Baku | 2 - 0 | Standard | Tofik Bakhramov Stadium |
| 14:00 AZT (UTC+4) | Neaga 55' (pen.); Aliuță 85' | Summary | Guliyev (red card) 80' | Attendance: 500; Referee: Afgan Hamzayev |

| 26 December 2009 17 | Simurq | 0 - 0 | Neftchi Baku | Zaqatala City Stadium |
| 15:00 AZT (UTC+4) | | Summary | | Attendance: Elnur Muradov; Referee: 500 |

| 3 February 2010 18 | Neftchi Baku | 0 - 0 | Qarabağ | Tofik Bakhramov Stadium |
| 15:00 AZT (UTC+4) | Huseynov (red card) 82' | Summary | | Attendance: 1,800; Referee: Elchin Mämmädov |

| 9 February 2010 19 | Neftchi Baku | 1 - 1 | Baku | Tofik Bakhramov Stadium |
| 15:00 AZT (UTC+4) | Neaga 38' (pen.) | Summary | Jabá 24' | Attendance: 300; Referee: Vusal Aliyev |

| 13 February 2010 20 | FK Karvan | 0 - 1 | Neftchi Baku | Yevlakh Stadium |
| 14:00 AZT (UTC+4) | Rahimov (yellow card) 19' (yellow-red card) 58'; Mammadov (yellow card) 25' (yellow-red card) 90' | Summary | Neaga 20' (pen.) | Attendance: 2,000; Referee: Afgan Hamzayev |

| 17 February 2010 21 | Neftchi Baku | 0 - 0 | Khazar Lankaran | Tofik Bakhramov Stadium |
| 14:00 AZT (UTC+4) | | Summary | | Attendance: 3,000; Referee: Fariz Yusifov |

| 21 February 2010 22 | Inter Baku | 1 - 0 | Neftchi Baku | Shafa Stadium |
| 14:00 AZT (UTC+4) | Karlsons 87' | Summary | | Attendance: 2,500; Referee: Elchin Mämmädov |

==== League table ====
| Pos | Team | Pld | W | D | L | GF | GA | GD | Pts | Qualification |
|---|---|---|---|---|---|---|---|---|---|---|
| 4 | Baku | 22 | 10 | 7 | 5 | 22 | 17 | +5 | 37 | Qualification for championship group |
| 5 | Gabala | 22 | 10 | 6 | 6 | 24 | 21 | +3 | 36 | Qualification for championship group |
| 6 | Neftçi Baku | 22 | 9 | 8 | 5 | 20 | 14 | +6 | 35 | Qualification for championship group |
| 7 | Simurq | 22 | 9 | 7 | 6 | 26 | 21 | +5 | 34 | Qualification for relegation group |
| 8 | Olimpik-Shuvalan | 22 | 6 | 7 | 9 | 20 | 23 | −3 | 25 | Qualification for relegation group |

Source: Soccerway.com
Rules for classification: 1) points; 2) goal difference; 3) number of goals scored.

=== Azerbaijan Premier League Championship Group ===
==== Results ====
| 13 March 2010 23 | Inter Baku | 1 - 1 | Neftchi Baku | Shafa Stadium |
| 16:00 AZT (UTC+4) | Červenka 45' | Summary | Neaga 77' (pen.) | Attendance: 2,500; Referee: Afgan Hamzayev |

| 21 March 2010 24 | Neftchi Baku | 1 - 0 | Baku | Tofik Bakhramov Stadium |
| 15:00 AZT (UTC+4) | Neaga 13' | Summary | | Attendance: 1,500; Referee: Rovshan Ahmadov |

| 27 March 2010 25 | Khazar Lankaran | 0 - 0 | Neftchi Baku | Lankaran City Stadium |
| 18:00 AZT (UTC+4) | | Summary | | Attendance: 14,000; Referee: Afgan Hamzayev |

| 3 April 2010 26 | Neftchi Baku | 1 - 2 | Gabala | Tofik Bakhramov Stadium |
| 16:00 AZST (UTC+5) | R.Abdullayev 63' | Summary | Antić 35'; Stolpa 90+5' | Attendance: 2,000; Referee: Elnur Muradov |

| 10 April 2010 27 | Qarabağ | 2 - 0 | Neftchi Baku | Baku^{2} |
| 16:00 AZST (UTC+5) | Adamia 47'; Aliyev 75' | Summary | | Stadium: Tofiq Bahramov Stadium; Attendance: 2,500; Referee: Rovshan Ahmadov |

| 18 April 2010 28 | Neftchi Baku | 1 - 0 | Inter Baku | Tofik Bakhramov Stadium |
| 16:00 AZST (UTC+5) | Huseynov 10' | Summary | | Attendance: 2,000; Referee: Fariz Yusifov |

| 23 April 2010 29 | Baku | 1 - 1 | Neftchi Baku | Tofig Bakhramov Stadium |
| 17:15 AZST (UTC+5) | Skulić 14'; Wênio (red card) 51' | Summary | Voskoboinikov 87' | Attendance: 700; Referee: Elchin Mämmädov |

| 1 May 2010 30 | Neftchi Baku | 0 - 0 | Khazar Lankaran | Tofik Bakhramov Stadium |
| 17:00 AZST (UTC+5) | | Summary | | Attendance: 4,000; Referee: Vusal Aliyev |

| 9 May 2010 31 | Gabala | 0 - 0 | Neftchi Baku | Gabala City Stadium |
| 17:15 AZST (UTC+5) | | Summary | | Attendance: 3,500; Referee: Afgan Hamzayev |

| 15 May 2010 32 | Neftchi Baku | 0 - 0 | Qarabağ | Tofik Bakhramov Stadium |
| 17:15 AZST (UTC+5) | | Summary | | Attendance: 3,000; Referee: Fariz Yusifov |

==== Table ====
| Pos | Team | Pld | W | D | L | GF | GA | GD | Pts | Qualification |
|---|---|---|---|---|---|---|---|---|---|---|
| 2 | Baku | 20 | 7 | 7 | 6 | 19 | 15 | +4 | 28 | Qualification for Europa League second qualifying round (Note: Baku were the winners of the 2009–10 Azerbaijan Cup competition and qualified for the second qualifying round of the UEFA Europa League.) |
| 3 | Qarabağ | 20 | 6 | 9 | 5 | 16 | 18 | −2 | 27 (Note: QAR: 7 pts, 4–3; KHA: 4 pts, 3–4) | Qualification for Europa League first qualifying round |
| 4 | Khazar Lankaran | 20 | 6 | 9 | 5 | 19 | 14 | +5 | 27 | Qualification for Europa League first qualifying round |
| 5 | Neftçi Baku | 20 | 4 | 11 | 5 | 11 | 12 | −1 | 23 | |
| 6 | Gabala | 20 | 4 | 8 | 8 | 18 | 27 | −9 | 20 | |

Source: Soccerway.com
Rules for classification: 1) points; 2) head-to-head points; 3) head-to-head goal difference; 4) head-to-head goals scored; 5) goal difference; 6) number of goals scored.

=== Azerbaijan Cup ===
| 4 November 2009 Last 16 1st Leg | Neftchi Baku | 5 - 0 | Neftchi ISM | Tofik Bakhramov Stadium |
| 14:00 AZT (UTC+4) | Aliyev 39', 63'; Guglielmone 40'; Aliuță 55'; Guluzade 76' | Summary; Summary |

| 11 November 2009 Last 16 2nd Leg | Neftchi ISM | 0 - 2 (0 - 7 agg.) | Neftchi Baku |
| 13:30 AZT (UTC+4) | | Summary; Summary | Guglielmone 32'; Aliyev 85' |

| 7 March 2010 Quarter-finals 1st Leg | Neftchi Baku | 0 - 3 | Inter Baku | Tofik Bakhramov Stadium |
| 14:00 AZT (UTC+4) | | Summary | Poškus 49', 88'; Odikadze 72' | Attendance: 1,000; Referee: Vusal Aliyev |

| 17 March 2010 Quarter-finals 2nd Leg | Inter Baku | 2 - 1 (5 - 1 agg.) | Neftchi Baku | Shafa Stadium |
| 16:00 AZT (UTC+4) | Mammadov 27'; Karlsons 54' | Summary | Aliuță 83' (pen.) | Attendance: 1,000; Referee: Elnur Muradov |

== Squad statistics ==
=== Appearances and goals ===
| No. | Pos | Nat | Player | Total | | Premier League | | Azerbaijan Cup | |
| No. | Pos | Nat | Player | Apps | Goals | Apps | Goals | Apps | Goals |
|---|---|---|---|---|---|---|---|---|---|
| 1 | GK | (Serbia) SRB | Vladimir Mićović | 9 | 0 | 9+0 | 0 | 0+0 | 0 |
| 2 | DF | (Azerbaijan) AZE | Rail Malikov | 27 | 1 | 27+0 | 1 | 0+0 | 0 |
| 3 | DF | (Turkey) TUR | Suat Usta | 20 | 0 | 17+3 | 0 | 0+0 | 0 |
| 4 | DF | (Estonia) EST | Taavi Rähn | 19 | 0 | 19+0 | 0 | 0+0 | 0 |
| 5 | MF | (Romania) ROU | Leonard Naidin | 25 | 1 | 23+2 | 1 | 0+0 | 0 |
| 6 | MF | (Azerbaijan) AZE | Eshgin Guliyev | 5 | 0 | 1+4 | 0 | 0+0 | 0 |
| 7 | FW | (Azerbaijan) AZE | Samir Aliyev | 13 | 1 | 1+12 | 1 | 0+0 | 0 |
| 8 | MF | (Azerbaijan) AZE | Elmar Bakhshiev | 20 | 0 | 14+6 | 0 | 0+0 | 0 |
| 9 | FW | (Uruguay) URU | Walter Guglielmone | 22 | 2 | 14+8 | 2 | 0+0 | 0 |
| 10 | MF | (Romania) ROU | Marian Aliuță | 24 | 3 | 15+9 | 3 | 0+0 | 0 |
| 11 | MF | (Azerbaijan) AZE | Javid Huseynov | 11 | 1 | 7+4 | 1 | 0+0 | 0 |
| 12 | GK | (Lithuania) LTU | Paulius Grybauskas | 22 | 0 | 22+0 | 0 | 0+0 | 0 |
| 15 | DF | (Azerbaijan) AZE | Ruslan Abishov | 25 | 0 | 25+0 | 0 | 0+0 | 0 |
| 16 | DF | (Estonia) EST | Dmitri Kruglov | 29 | 1 | 29+0 | 1 | 0+0 | 0 |
| 17 | MF | (Azerbaijan) AZE | Araz Abdullayev | 10 | 0 | 7+3 | 0 | 0+0 | 0 |
| 18 | DF | (Azerbaijan) AZE | Ruslan Amirjanov | 21 | 0 | 17+4 | 0 | 0+0 | 0 |
| 20 | FW | (Brazil) BRA | José Carlos | 8 | 0 | 1+7 | 0 | 0+0 | 0 |
| 22 | MF | (Azerbaijan) AZE | Zaur Tagizade | 10 | 0 | 6+4 | 0 | 0+0 | 0 |
| 23 | DF | (Azerbaijan) AZE | Tural Narimanov | 5 | 0 | 3+2 | 0 | 0+0 | 0 |
| 26 | MF | (Turkmenistan) TKM | Nazar Baýramow | 14 | 0 | 12+2 | 0 | 0+0 | 0 |
| 27 | MF | (Azerbaijan) AZE | Rashad Abdullayev | 26 | 2 | 25+1 | 2 | 0+0 | 0 |
| 28 | FW | (Azerbaijan) AZE | Amit Guluzade | 1 | 0 | 1+0 | 0 | 0+0 | 0 |
| 25 | FW | (Romania) ROU | Adrian Neaga | 30 | 11 | 30+0 | 11 | 0+0 | 0 |
| 30 | FW | (Cameroon) CMR | Valentine Atem | 15 | 1 | 5+10 | 1 | 0+0 | 0 |
| 44 | DF | (Georgia (country)) GEO | Valeri Abramidze | 13 | 0 | 13+0 | 0 | 0+0 | 0 |
| 89 | GK | (Azerbaijan) AZE | Elchin Sadygov | 1 | 0 | 1+0 | 0 | 0+0 | 0 |
| | DF | (Azerbaijan) AZE | Tärlän Quliyev | 1 | 0 | 1+0 | 0 | 0+0 | 0 |
| | MF | (Azerbaijan) AZE | Mirhuseyn Seyidov | 1 | 0 | 1+0 | 0 | 0+0 | 0 |
| | FW | (Estonia) EST | Vladimir Voskoboinikov | 9 | 1 | 5+4 | 1 | 0+0 | 0 |
Players who appeared for Neftchi Baku that left during the season:
| 14 | DF | (Estonia) EST | Andrei Stepanov | 1 | 0 | 1+0 | 0 | 0+0 | 0 |

=== Goal scorers ===
| Place | Position | Nation | Number | Name | Premier League | Azerbaijan Cup | Total |
|---|---|---|---|---|---|---|---|
| 1 | FW | (Romania) | 25 | Adrian Neaga | 11 | 0 | 11 |
| 2 | MF | (Romania) | 10 | Marian Aliuță | 3 | 2 | 5 |
| 3 | FW | (Uruguay) | 9 | Walter Guglielmone | 2 | 2 | 4 |
| 3 | FW | (Azerbaijan) | 7 | Samir Aliyev | 1 | 3 | 4 |
| 5 | MF | (Azerbaijan) | 27 | Rashad Abdullayev | 2 | 0 | 2 |
| 6 | FW | (Estonia) | | Vladimir Voskoboinikov | 1 | 0 | 1 |
| 6 | FW | (Cameroon) | 30 | Valentine Atem | 1 | 0 | 1 |
| 6 | MF | (Azerbaijan) | 11 | Javid Huseynov | 1 | 0 | 1 |
| 6 | MF | (Romania) | 5 | Leonard Naidin | 1 | 0 | 1 |
| 6 | DF | (Azerbaijan) | 2 | Rail Malikov | 1 | 0 | 1 |
| 6 | DF | (Estonia) | 16 | Dmitri Kruglov | 1 | 0 | 1 |
| 6 | FW | (Azerbaijan) | 28 | Amit Guluzade | 0 | 1 | 1 |
| | | | | TOTALS | 25 | 8 | 25 |

=== Disciplinary record ===
| Number | Nation | Position | Name | Premier League | | Azerbaijan Cup | | Total | |
| Number | Nation | Position | Name | Yellow card | Red card | Yellow card | Red card | Yellow card | Red card |
| 1 | (Serbia) | GK | Vladimir Mićović | 1 | 0 | 0 | 0 | 1 | 0 |
| 2 | (Azerbaijan) | DF | Rail Malikov | 3 | 0 | 0 | 0 | 3 | 0 |
| 3 | (Turkey) | DF | Suat Usta | 5 | 1 | 0 | 0 | 5 | 1 |
| 4 | (Estonia) | DF | Taavi Rähn | 5 | 0 | 0 | 0 | 5 | 0 |
| 5 | (Romania) | MF | Leonard Naidin | 4 | 0 | 0 | 0 | 4 | 0 |
| 6 | (Azerbaijan) | MF | Eshgin Guliyev | 1 | 0 | 0 | 0 | 1 | 0 |
| 8 | (Azerbaijan) | MF | Elmar Bakhshiev | 4 | 0 | 0 | 0 | 4 | 0 |
| 9 | (Uruguay) | FW | Walter Guglielmone | 3 | 0 | 0 | 0 | 3 | 0 |
| 10 | (Romania) | MF | Marian Aliuță | 4 | 0 | 0 | 0 | 4 | 0 |
| 11 | (Azerbaijan) | MF | Javid Huseynov | 0 | 1 | 0 | 0 | 0 | 1 |
| 15 | (Azerbaijan) | DF | Ruslan Abishov | 3 | 0 | 0 | 0 | 3 | 0 |
| 16 | (Estonia) | DF | Dmitri Kruglov | 3 | 0 | 0 | 0 | 3 | 0 |
| 18 | (Azerbaijan) | DF | Ruslan Amirjanov | 1 | 0 | 0 | 0 | 1 | 0 |
| 20 | (Brazil) | FW | José Carlos | 1 | 0 | 0 | 0 | 1 | 0 |
| 22 | (Azerbaijan) | MF | Zaur Tagizade | 1 | 0 | 0 | 0 | 1 | 0 |
| 25 | (Romania) | FW | Adrian Neaga | 7 | 0 | 0 | 0 | 7 | 0 |
| 26 | (Turkmenistan) | MF | Nazar Baýramow | 3 | 0 | 0 | 0 | 3 | 0 |
| 27 | (Azerbaijan) | MF | Rashad Abdullayev | 6 | 0 | 0 | 0 | 6 | 0 |
| 30 | (Cameroon) | FW | Valentine Atem | 3 | 0 | 0 | 0 | 3 | 0 |
| 44 | (Georgia (country)) | DF | Valeri Abramidze | 3 | 0 | 0 | 0 | 3 | 0 |
| | (Estonia) | FW | Vladimir Voskoboinikov | 3 | 0 | 0 | 0 | 3 | 0 |
| | | | TOTALS | 64 | 1 | 0 | 0 | 64 | 1 |

=== Player of the Month ===
| Month | Player of the Month | |
| Month | Player | Club |
|---|---|---|
| March | (Azerbaijan) Araz Abdullayev | Neftchi Baku |
