= 2008–09 Neftchi Baku PFK season =

Neftchi Baku
2008–09 season
- Chairman: Sadyg Sadygov
- Manager: Anatoliy Demyanenko until 1 September 2008; Hans-Jürgen Gede; 1 September 2008 – 28 February 2009; Boyukaga Agaev from28 February 2009
- Stadium: Tofik Bakhramov Stadium
- Premier League: 8th
- Azerbaijan Cup: Quarterfinals vs Karabakh
- UEFA Intertoto Cup: Third round vs Vaslui
- Top goalscorer: League: Adrian Neaga (5); All: Adrian Neaga (5)
Home colours	Away colours

The Neftchi Baku 2008–09 season was Neftchi Baku's seventeenth Azerbaijan Premier League season. They started the season under the management of Anatoliy Demyanenko, however he was replaced by Hans-Jürgen Gede on 1 September 2008. On 28 February 2009 Gede was replaced Boyukaga Agaev, who was in charge until the end of the season. They finished 8th in the league and were knocked out of the Azerbaijan Cup at the quarterfinal stage by Karabakh. Neftchi also took part in the UEFA Intertoto Cup, reaching the Third Round before losing to Vaslui of Romania.

== Squad ==
Note: Flags indicate national team as defined under FIFA eligibility rules; some limited exceptions apply. Players may hold more than one non-FIFA nationality.

No.	Pos.	Nation	Player
1	GK	SRB	Vladimir Mićović
2	DF	AZE	Rail Malikov
3	DF	UKR	Volodymyr Olefir
4	DF	EST	Dmitri Kruglov
5	MF	AZE	Araz Abdullayev
6	MF	AZE	Javid Imamverdiyev
7	FW	AZE	Samir Aliyev
9	MF	AZE	Mirhuseyn Seyidov
10	MF	AZE	Eshgin Guliyev
11	MF	BUL	Marcho Dafchev
12	GK	AZE	Anar Nazirov
15	DF	AZE	Ruslan Abishov
17	FW	TUR	Ali Cansun
19	DF	TUR	Suat Usta
21	FW	BRA	José Carlos

No.	Pos.	Nation	Player
22	FW	AZE	Zaur Tagizade
23	MF	AZE	Elmar Bakhshiev
25	DF	AZE	Emin Jafarguliyev
27	FW	CMR	Valentine Atem
32	DF	TKM	Nazar Baýramow
34	GK	POL	Tomasz Bobel
77	MF	BUL	Svetoslav Petrov
—	DF	AZE	Eltun Yagublu
—	DF	AUS	John Tambouras
—	DF	IRL	Joe Kendrick
—	MF	AZE	Orkhan Hasanov
—	MF	ROU	Marian Aliuță
—	FW	ROU	Adrian Neaga
—	FW	AZE	Tural Isgandarov

== Transfers ==
=== Summer ===
In: Note: Flags indicate national team as defined under FIFA eligibility rules; some limited exceptions apply. Players may hold more than one non-FIFA nationality.

No.	Pos.	Nation	Player
3	DF	UKR	Volodymyr Olefir (from (Ukraine) Naftovyk-Ukrnafta Okhtyrka)
4	DF	EST	Dmitri Kruglov (from (Russia) Lokomotiv Moscow, previously on loan)
9	FW	GEO	Giorgi Chelidze (from (Georgia (country)) Dinamo Batumi)
11	MF	BUL	Marcho Dafchev (from (Bulgaria) Lokomotiv Sofia)
17	MF	UKR	Oleh Herasymyuk (loan from (Ukraine) Dynamo-2 Kyiv)
19	DF	TUR	Suat Usta (from (Turkey) Çaykur Rizespor)
23	MF	AZE	Elmar Bakhshiev (from (Azerbaijan) Khazar Lankaran)
27	FW	CMR	Valentine Atem (from (Germany) MSV Duisburg)
—	FW	ROU	Adrian Neaga (from (Romania) Steaua București)

Out: Note: Flags indicate national team as defined under FIFA eligibility rules; some limited exceptions apply. Players may hold more than one non-FIFA nationality.

No.	Pos.	Nation	Player
6	MF	AZE	Rashad Sadiqov (to (Azerbaijan) Qarabağ)
7	MF	MDA	Vadim Boreț (to (Azerbaijan) Baku)
12	GK	AZE	Huseyn Mahammadov (to (Azerbaijan) Standard Baku)
20	FW	AZE	Branimir Subašić (to (Serbia) Red Star Belgrade)
22	MF	AZE	Marcos (loan return to (Azerbaijan) Karvan)
77	DF	AZE	Ramin Guliyev (to (Azerbaijan) Olimpik Baku)

=== Winter ===
In: Note: Flags indicate national team as defined under FIFA eligibility rules; some limited exceptions apply. Players may hold more than one non-FIFA nationality.

No.	Pos.	Nation	Player
5	MF	AZE	Araz Abdullayev (from Youth Team)
6	MF	AZE	Javid Imamverdiyev (from Youth Team)
9	MF	AZE	Mirhuseyn Seyidov (from Youth Team)
34	GK	POL	Tomasz Bobel (from (Germany) FC Erzgebirge Aue)
—	DF	AUS	John Tambouras (from (Republic of Ireland) Drogheda United)
—	DF	IRL	Joe Kendrick (from (Republic of Ireland) Drogheda United)
—	MF	ROU	Marian Aliuță (from (Romania) FC Vaslui)

Out: Note: Flags indicate national team as defined under FIFA eligibility rules; some limited exceptions apply. Players may hold more than one non-FIFA nationality.

No.	Pos.	Nation	Player
5	DF	AZE	Elnur Allahverdiyev (to (Azerbaijan) Qarabağ)
8	MF	AZE	Aleksandr Chertoganov (to (Azerbaijan) Simurq)
9	FW	GEO	Giorgi Chelidze (to (Georgia (country)) Olimpi Rustavi)
10	FW	GEO	Georgi Adamia (to (Azerbaijan) Baku)
14	DF	AZE	Rashad Sadygov (to (Turkey) Kocaelispor)
17	MF	UKR	Oleh Herasymyuk (loan return to (Ukraine) Dynamo-2 Kyiv)

== Competitions ==
=== Azerbaijan Premier League ===
==== Results ====
9 August 2008 1	Standard Baku	1 – 0	Neftchi Baku	Baku
18:15 AZST (UTC+5)	Pisla 45'	Summary		Stadium: Shafa Stadium

16 August 2008 2	Neftchi Baku	0 – 1	Baku	Baku
18:00 AZST (UTC+5)		Summary	Pérez 48'	Stadium: Tofig Bakhramov Stadium

24 August 2008 3	Gabala	0 – 1	Neftchi Baku	Qabala
15:00 AZST (UTC+5)		Summary	Herasymyuk 40'	Stadium: Gabala City Stadium

30 August 2008 4	Neftchi Baku	0 – 0	Simurq	Baku
18:00 AZST (UTC+5)		Summary		Stadium: Tofig Bakhramov Stadium

21 September 2008 5	Turan Tovuz	0 – 0	Neftchi Baku	Tovuz
13:30 AZST (UTC+5)		Summary		Stadium: Tovuz City Stadium

27 September 2008 6	Neftchi Baku	0 – 0	NBC Salyan^{1}	Baku
15:00 AZST (UTC+5)		Summary		Stadium: Tofig Bakhramov Stadium

5 October 2008 7	MOIK Baku	0 – 5	Neftchi Baku	Baku
14:15 AZST (UTC+5)		Summary	A.Cansun 45'; Kruglov 47'; José Carlos 66'; Abdullayev 84'; Bakhshiev 90'	Stadium: MOIK Stadium

19 October 2008 8	Khazar Lankaran	2 – 0	Neftchi Baku	Lankaran
15:00 AZST (UTC+5)	Tsvetkov 30'; Abdullayev 43'	Summary		Stadium: Lankaran City Stadium

25 October 2008 9	Neftchi Baku	1 – 3	Inter Baku	Baku
14:15 AZST (UTC+5)	Dafchev 83' (pen.)	Summary	Guglielmone 25' (pen.); Accioly 44'; Rubins 63'	Stadium: Tofig Bakhramov Stadium

8 November 2008 10	Qarabağ	1 – 1	Neftchi Baku	Baku^{2}
AZT (UTC+4)	Imamaliev 90'	Summary	Bakhshiev 23'	Stadium: Tofiq Bahramov Stadium

15 November 2008 11	Neftchi Baku	0 – 1	Karvan	Baku
AZT (UTC+4)		Summary	Doros 54'	Stadium: Tofig Bakhramov Stadium

23 November 2008 12	Bakili Baku	0 – 2	Neftchi Baku	Baku
AZT (UTC+4)		Summary	Seyidov 3'; A.Cansun 56'	Stadium: Shafa Stadium

30 November 2008 13	Neftchi Baku	1 – 2	Olimpik Baku	Baku
14:30 AZT (UTC+4)	Bakhshiev 6'	Summary	Gomes 13'; Getsadze 90'	Stadium: Tofig Bakhramov Stadium

15 February 2009 14	Neftchi Baku	2 – 1	Standard Baku	Baku
16:00 AZT (UTC+4)	Neaga 33'; A.Cansun 90'	Summary	Rodrigo 60'	Stadium: Tofig Bakhramov Stadium

21 February 2009 15	Baku	2 – 0	Neftchi Baku	Baku
16:00 AZT (UTC+4)	Mujiri 48'; Batista 76'	Summary		Stadium: Tofig Bakhramov Stadium

1 March 2009 16	Neftchi Baku	0 – 0	Gabala	Baku
16:15 AZT (UTC+4)		Summary		Stadium: Tofig Bakhramov Stadium

8 March 2009 17	Simurq	0 – 2	Neftchi Baku	Zaqatala
18:00 AZT (UTC+4)		Summary	Atem 40'; Usta 50'	Stadium: Zaqatala City Stadium

15 March 2009 18	Neftchi Baku	1 – 1	Turan Tovuz	Baku
16:00 AZT (UTC+4)	Dafchev 59'	Summary	A.Gadiri 6'	Stadium: Tofig Bakhramov Stadium

21 March 2009 19	Mughan	0 – 3	Neftchi Baku	Salyan
15:00 AZT (UTC+4)		Summary	Kruglov 3'; Aliyev 53'; Neaga 67'	Stadium: Salyany Olympic Sport Complex Stadium

5 April 2009 20	Neftchi Baku	3 – 1	MOIK Baku	Baku
18:00 AZST (UTC+5)	Atem 13', 27'; Neaga 83'	Summary	Aliyev 63'	Stadium: Tofig Bakhramov Stadium

12 April 2009 21	Neftchi Baku	2 – 1	Khazar Lankaran	Baku
19:00 AZST (UTC+5)	Tagizade 10'; A.Cansun 90'	Summary	Dursun 50'	Stadium: Tofig Bakhramov Stadium

19 April 2009 22	Inter Baku	2 – 2	Neftchi Baku	Baku
16:00 AZST (UTC+5)	Guglielmone 52', 55'	Summary	Petrov 24'; Olefir 44'	Stadium: Shafa Stadium

26 April 2009 23	Neftchi Baku	0 – 1	Qarabağ	Baku
19:00 AZST (UTC+5)		Summary	Teli 70'	Stadium: Tofig Bakhramov Stadium

3 May 2009 24	Karvan	1 – 1	Neftchi Baku	Yevlakh
16:00 AZST (UTC+5)	Nadirov 47'	Summary	Aliuță 62' (pen.)	Stadium: Yevlakh Stadium

9 May 2009 25	Neftchi Baku	3 – 0	Bakili Baku	Baku
17:00 AZST (UTC+5)	Aliuță 4'; Neaga 45', 60'	Summary		Stadium: Tofig Bakhramov Stadium

17 May 2009 26	Olimpik Baku	0 – 0	Neftchi Baku	Baku
18:00 AZST (UTC+5)		Summary		Stadium: Shafa Stadium

==== Table ====
Pos	Team	Pld	W	D	L	GF	GA	GD	Pts
6	Olimpik Baku	26	12	8	6	32	18	+14	44
7	Standard Baku	26	12	3	11	30	31	−1	39
8	Neftçi Baku	26	9	9	8	30	21	+9	36
9	Karvan	26	10	4	12	28	33	−5	34
10	Gabala	26	9	6	11	28	21	+7	33

Source: Soccerway.com
Rules for classification: 1) points; 2) goal difference; 3) number of goals scored.

=== Azerbaijan Cup ===
29 October 2008 Round of 16 1st Leg	Neftchi Baku	2 – 1	MOIK Baku	Baku
AZST (UTC+5)	Dafchev 18' (pen.); Kruglov 62'	Summary	Safarzade 4'	Stadium: Tofiq Bahramov Stadium

5 November 2008 Round of 16 2nd Leg	MOIK Baku	0 – 3 (1 – 5 agg.)	Neftchi Baku	Baku
AZST (UTC+5)		Summary	José Carlos 13'; Bakhshiev 32'; Abishov 43'	Stadium: MOIK Stadium

24 February 2009 Quarterfinals 1st Leg	Karabakh	1 – 0	Neftchi Baku	Baku^{2}
AZST (UTC+5)	Ramazanov 4'	Summary		Stadium: Tofiq Bahramov Stadium

12 March 2009 Quarterfinals 2nd Leg	Neftchi Baku	0 – 0 (1 – 0 agg.)	Karabakh	Baku
AZST (UTC+5)		Summary		Stadium: Tofiq Bahramov Stadium

=== Intertoto Cup ===
21 June 2008 First Round 1st leg	Neftchi Baku (Azerbaijan)	2 – 0	(Slovakia) Nitra	Baku, Azerbaijan
21:00 AZST (UTC+5)	Sadygov 7'; Sadiqov 10'	Report		Stadium: Tofik Bakhramov Stadium; Referee: Marcin Borski (Poland)

28 June 2008 First Round 2nd leg	Nitra (Slovakia)	3 – 1 (3 – 3 (a) agg.)	(Azerbaijan) Neftchi Baku	Nitra, Slovakia
20:00 AZST (UTC+5)	Semeník 21', 83'; Čeman 46'	Report	José Carlos 84'	Stadium: Štadión pod Zoborom; Referee: Novo Panic (Bosnia & Herzegovina)

5 July 2008 Second Round 1st leg	Germinal Beerschot (Belgium)	1 – 1	(Azerbaijan) Neftchi Baku	Antwerp, Belgium
23:00 AZST (UTC+5)	Malki 18'	Report	Adamia 31'	Stadium: Olympisch Stadion; Referee: Dejan Filipović (Serbia)

12 July 2008 Second Round 2nd leg	Neftchi Baku (Azerbaijan)	1 – 0 (2 – 1 agg.)	(Belgium) Germinal Beerschot	Baku, Azerbaijan
21:00 AZST (UTC+5)	Allahverdiyev 57'	Report		Stadium: Tofik Bakhramov Stadium; Referee: Mark Clattenburg (England)

19 July 2008 Third Round 1st leg	Neftchi Baku (Azerbaijan)	2 – 1	(Romania) Vaslui	Baku, Azerbaijan
21:00 AZST (UTC+5)	Herasymyuk 28'; Sadiqov 84'	Report	Genchev 29'	Stadium: Tofik Bakhramov Stadium; Referee: Igor Egorov (Russia)

26 July 2008 Third Round 2nd leg	Vaslui (Romania)	2 – 0 (3 – 2 agg.)	(Azerbaijan) Neftchi Baku	Vaslui, Romania
22:30 AZST (UTC+5)	Burdujan 30'; Temwanjera 38'	Report		Stadium: Stadionul Municipal; Referee: Robert Schörgenhofer (Austria)

== Squad statistics ==
=== Appearances and goals ===
No.	Pos	Nat	Player	Total		Premier League		Azerbaijan Cup		Intertoto Cup	
No.	Pos	Nat	Player	Apps	Goals	Apps	Goals	Apps	Goals	Apps	Goals
1	GK	(Serbia) SRB	Vladimir Mićović	26	0	20	0	0	0	6	0
2	DF	(Azerbaijan) AZE	Rail Malikov	26	0	21	0	0	0	5	0
3	DF	(Ukraine) UKR	Volodymyr Olefir	19	1	14	1	0	0	5	0
4	DF	(Estonia) EST	Dmitri Kruglov	29	2	24	2	0	0	5	0
4	DF	(Australia) AUS	John Tambouras	3	0	3	0	0	0	0	0
5	MF	(Azerbaijan) AZE	Araz Abdullayev	5	1	5	1	0	0	0	0
6	MF	(Azerbaijan) AZE	Javid Imamverdiyev	6	0	6	0	0	0	0	0
7	FW	(Azerbaijan) AZE	Samir Aliyev	12	1	11	1	0	0	1	0
9	MF	(Azerbaijan) AZE	Mirhuseyn Seyidov	5	1	5	1	0	0	0	0
10	MF	(Azerbaijan) AZE	Eshgin Guliyev	12	0	11	0	0	0	1	0
11	MF	(Bulgaria) BUL	Marcho Dafchev	16	2	12	2	0	0	4	0
12	GK	(Azerbaijan) AZE	Anar Nazirov	3	0	3	0	0	0	0	0
15	DF	(Azerbaijan) AZE	Ruslan Abishov	22	0	16	0	0	0	6	0
17	FW	(Turkey) TUR	Ali Cansun	15	4	15	4	0	0	0	0
19	DF	(Turkey) TUR	Suat Usta	17	1	17	1	0	0	0	0
20	DF	(Azerbaijan) AZE	Ruslan Abbasov	2	0	0	0	0	0	2	0
21	FW	(Brazil) BRA	José Carlos	20	2	19	1	0	0	1	1
22	FW	(Azerbaijan) AZE	Zaur Tagizade	12	1	8	1	0	0	4	0
23	MF	(Azerbaijan) AZE	Elmar Bakhshiev	24	3	24	3	0	0	0	0
25	MF	(Azerbaijan) AZE	Emin Jafarguliyev	6	0	6	0	0	0	0	0
27	FW	(Cameroon) CMR	Valentine Atem	13	3	13	3	0	0	0	0
32	DF	(Turkmenistan) TKM	Nazar Baýramow	25	0	19	0	0	0	6	0
34	GK	(Poland) POL	Tomasz Bobel	3	0	3	0	0	0	0	0
77	MF	(Bulgaria) BUL	Svetoslav Petrov	13	1	13	1	0	0	0	0
	DF	(Azerbaijan) AZE	Eltun Yagublu	1	0	1	0	0	0	0	0
	DF	(Republic of Ireland) IRL	Joe Kendrick	2	0	2	0	0	0	0	0
	MF	(Romania) ROU	Marian Aliuță	7	2	7	2	0	0	0	0
	MF	(Azerbaijan) AZE	Orkhan Hasanov	5	0	5	0	0	0	0	0
	FW	(Romania) ROU	Adrian Neaga	13	5	13	5	0	0	0	0
	FW	(Azerbaijan) AZE	Tural Isgandarov	1	0	1	0	0	0	0	0
Players who appeared for Neftchi Baku who left during the season:
5	DF	(Azerbaijan) AZE	Elnur Allahverdiyev	11	1	5	0	0	0	6	1
6	MF	(Azerbaijan) AZE	Rashad Sadiqov	9	2	4	0	0	0	5	2
8	MF	(Azerbaijan) AZE	Aleksandr Chertoganov	11	0	6	0	0	0	5	0
9	FW	(Georgia (country)) GEO	Giorgi Chelidze	7	0	4	0	0	0	3	0
10	FW	(Georgia (country)) GEO	Georgi Adamia	14	1	8	0	0	0	6	1
14	DF	(Azerbaijan) AZE	Rashad Sadygov	15	1	9	0	0	0	6	1
17	MF	(Ukraine) UKR	Oleh Herasymyuk	11	2	5	1	0	0	6	1

=== Goal scorers ===
Place	Position	Nation	Number	Name	Premier League	Azerbaijan Cup	Intertoto Cup	Total
1	FW	(Romania)		Adrian Neaga	5	0	0	5
2	FW	(Turkey)	17	Ali Cansun	4	0	0	4
2	MF	(Azerbaijan)	23	Elmar Bakhshiev	3	1	0	4
4	FW	(Cameroon)	27	Valentine Atem	3	0	0	3
4	DF	(Estonia)	4	Dmitri Kruglov	2	1	0	3
4	MF	(Bulgaria)	11	Marcho Dafchev	2	1	0	3
4	FW	(Brazil)	21	José Carlos	1	1	1	3
8	MF	(Romania)	12	Marian Aliuță	2	0	0	2
8	MF	(Ukraine)	17	Oleh Herasymyuk	1	0	1	2
8	MF	(Azerbaijan)	6	Rashad Sadiqov	0	0	2	2
11	DF	(Turkey)	19	Suat Usta	1	0	0	1
11	DF	(Ukraine)	3	Volodymyr Olefir	1	0	0	1
11	MF	(Bulgaria)	77	Svetoslav Petrov	1	0	0	1
11	FW	(Azerbaijan)	7	Samir Aliyev	1	0	0	1
11	FW	(Azerbaijan)	22	Zaur Tagizade	1	0	0	1
11	MF	(Azerbaijan)	5	Araz Abdullayev	1	0	0	1
11	MF	(Azerbaijan)	9	Mirhuseyn Seyidov	1	0	0	1
11	DF	(Azerbaijan)	15	Ruslan Abishov	0	0	1	1
11	DF	(Azerbaijan)	14	Rashad Sadygov	0	0	1	1
11	FW	(Georgia (country))	10	Georgi Adamia	0	0	1	1
11	DF	(Azerbaijan)	5	Elnur Allahverdiyev	0	0	1	1
				TOTALS	30	5	7	42

== Notes ==
- On 31 October 2008, FK NBC Salyan changed their name to FK Mughan.
- Qarabağ have played their home games at the Tofiq Bahramov Stadium since 1993 due to the ongoing situation in Quzanlı.
