= List of Azerbaijan football transfers summer 2010 =

This is a list of Azerbaijan football transfers in the summer transfer window 2010 by club. Only clubs of the 2010–11 Azerbaijan Premier League are included.

== Azerbaijan Premier League 2010–11 ==
=== AZAL Baku ===
In: Note: Flags indicate national team as defined under FIFA eligibility rules; some limited exceptions apply. Players may hold more than one non-FIFA nationality.

No.	Pos.	Nation	Player
2	DF	MKD	Robert Petrov (from (Bulgaria) Slavia Sofia)
6	DF	LAT	Ritus Krjauklis (from (Latvia) Ventspils)
8	FW	ALB	Eleandro Pema (from (Albania) Kastrioti Kruje)
11	MF	MAR	Zouhir Benouahi (from (Kuwait) Al-Fahaheel)
14	DF	AZE	Elvin Aliyev (loan from (Azerbaijan) FK Baku)
20	DF	LTU	Marius Kazlauskas (from (Slovakia) Dunajská Streda)
23	MF	NGR	Pius Ikedia (from (Netherlands) RBC Roosendaal)

Out: Note: Flags indicate national team as defined under FIFA eligibility rules; some limited exceptions apply. Players may hold more than one non-FIFA nationality.

No.	Pos.	Nation	Player
2	DF	MDA	Serghei Laşcencov (Banned)
—	MF	BRA	Claudiano (to (Indonesia) Sriwijaya)
—	FW	BRA	Ismael Gaúcho (to (Portugal) Juventude Sport Clube)

=== Baku ===
In: Note: Flags indicate national team as defined under FIFA eligibility rules; some limited exceptions apply. Players may hold more than one non-FIFA nationality.

No.	Pos.	Nation	Player
2	FW	BIH	Saša Kajkut (from (Serbia) Borac Banja Luka)
5	DF	FRA	Stéphane Borbiconi (loan from (France) FC Metz)
6	DF	TOG	Daré Nibombé (from (Romania) Politehnica Timișoara)
9	FW	AZE	Vagif Javadov (loan from (Netherlands) FC Twente)
10	FW	CMR	Joël Epalle (from (Germany) VfL Bochum)
11	FW	MAR	Adnan Barakat (from (Netherlands) Den Bosch)
12	FW	MDA	Veaceslav Sofroni (from (Moldova) Zimbru Chişinău)
25	MF	COL	Jefferson Angulo (from (Brazil) Catanduvense)
29	DF	AZE	Aziz Guliyev (from (Azerbaijan) FK Karvan)
30	MF	SLE	Ibrahim Kargbo (from (Netherlands) Willem II)
55	MF	BRA	Juninho (from (Azerbaijan) Khazar Lankaran)
99	FW	BRA	Leo Rocha (from (Venezuela) Deportivo Lara)

Out: Note: Flags indicate national team as defined under FIFA eligibility rules; some limited exceptions apply. Players may hold more than one non-FIFA nationality.

No.	Pos.	Nation	Player
14	DF	AZE	Elvin Aliyev (loan to (Azerbaijan) AZAL)
18	MF	BDI	Floribert Ndayisaba (to (Burundi) Fantastique Bujumbura)
19	FW	NGR	Ahmad Tijani (released)
21	MF	BRA	Wênio (to (Brazil) Morrinhos)
22	DF	AZE	Sabuhi Hasanov (to (Azerbaijan) Simurq)
29	MF	ROU	Cristian Muscalu (to (Poland) Tur Turek)
33	DF	AZE	Saşa Yunisoğlu (to (Azerbaijan) Gabala)
34	FW	BRA	Adriano (to (Brazil) Metropolitano)
55	FW	KEN	Allan Wanga (to (Vietnam) Hoang Anh Gia Lai)

=== Gabala ===
In: Note: Flags indicate national team as defined under FIFA eligibility rules; some limited exceptions apply. Players may hold more than one non-FIFA nationality.

No.	Pos.	Nation	Player
3	FW	AZE	Nodar Mammadov (From (Azerbaijan) Qarabağ)
4	DF	AZE	Ramin Guliyev (From (Azerbaijan) Standard Sumgayit)
8	MF	BRA	Bruno Barbosa (From (Brazil) São Paulo)
9	MF	BRA	Bruno Anjos (loan from (Brazil) São Paulo)
10	FW	JAM	Deon Burton (From (England) Charlton Athletic)
11	MF	ENG	Terry Cooke (From (Australia) North Queensland Fury)
17	MF	AZE	Arif İsayev (From (Azerbaijan) Standard)
19	FW	BRA	Julio Cézar de Moura Almeida (loan from (Brazil) São Paulo)
19	FW	AZE	Branimir Subašić (From (Serbia) Red Star Belgrade)
21	MF	AZE	Asaf Gadiri (From (Azerbaijan) Turan Tovuz)
21	FW	AZE	Murad Hüseynov (From (Serbia) Mladost Lučani)
25	MF	AZE	Nuran Gurbanov (From (Azerbaijan) MOIK)
30	GK	AZE	Anar Nazirov (From (Azerbaijan) Standard)
33	DF	AZE	Saşa Yunisoğlu (From (Azerbaijan) Baku)
34	DF	NED	Steve Olfers (From (Netherlands) PSV Eindhoven)

Out: Note: Flags indicate national team as defined under FIFA eligibility rules; some limited exceptions apply. Players may hold more than one non-FIFA nationality.

No.	Pos.	Nation	Player
4	DF	AZE	Azer Mammadov (to (Azerbaijan) Kapaz)
8	MF	UKR	Maksym Skorokhodov (to (Ukraine) Feniks-Illichovets Kalinine)
9	FW	POL	Tomasz Stolpa (to (Poland) Zagłębie Sosnowiec)
10	FW	AZE	Kenan Kerimov (to (Azerbaijan) Kapaz)
11	MF	MDA	Anatolie Ostap (to (Lithuania) Banga Gargždai)
17	MF	POR	Paulino Lopes Tavares (to (France) Aubervilliers)
19	MF	GEO	Revaz Getsadze (to (Georgia (country)) Metalurgi Rustavi)
19	FW	BRA	Julio Cézar de Moura Almeida (loan return (Brazil) São Paulo)
21	DF	AZE	Arif Dashdemirov (to (Azerbaijan) Inter Baku)
23	MF	AZE	Azer Hashimov (to (Azerbaijan) MOIK)
24	FW	UKR	Igor Melnyk (to (Ukraine) Sumy)

=== Ganja ===
In: Note: Flags indicate national team as defined under FIFA eligibility rules; some limited exceptions apply. Players may hold more than one non-FIFA nationality.

No.	Pos.	Nation	Player

Out: Note: Flags indicate national team as defined under FIFA eligibility rules; some limited exceptions apply. Players may hold more than one non-FIFA nationality.

No.	Pos.	Nation	Player

=== Inter Baku ===
In: Note: Flags indicate national team as defined under FIFA eligibility rules; some limited exceptions apply. Players may hold more than one non-FIFA nationality.

No.	Pos.	Nation	Player
5	DF	BUL	Zhivko Zhelev (From (Romania) Steaua București)
6	DF	EST	Dmitri Kruglov (From (Azerbaijan) Neftchi Baku)
12	MF	MKD	Filip Despotovski (From (Ukraine) Vorskla Poltava)
18	DF	GEO	Ilia Kandelaki (From (Austria) Sturm Graz)
21	DF	AZE	Arif Dashdemirov (From (Azerbaijan) Gabala)
35	MF	BRA	Mario Sergio (From (Azerbaijan) Khazar Lankaran)
44	DF	GEO	Valeri Abramidze (From (Azerbaijan) Neftchi Baku)
72	GK	AZE	Dmitriy Kramarenko (From (Azerbaijan) Khazar Lankaran)

Out: Note: Flags indicate national team as defined under FIFA eligibility rules; some limited exceptions apply. Players may hold more than one non-FIFA nationality.

No.	Pos.	Nation	Player
5	DF	SRB	Milan Zagorac (to (Serbia) FK Zemun)
5	DF	BUL	Zhivko Zhelev (loan to (Azerbaijan) Simurq)
6	MF	AZE	Aliyar Ismailov (to (Russia) Biolog-Novokubansk Progress)
7	FW	URU	Ángel Gutiérrez (to (Azerbaijan) Mughan)
7	MF	AZE	Nizami Hajiyev (loan to (Azerbaijan) MOIK Baku)
9	DF	AZE	Samir Abbasov (to (Azerbaijan) Qarabağ)
10	MF	AZE	Jamal Mammadov (loan to (Azerbaijan) Simurq)
10	MF	BRA	Sérgio Oliveira (to (Malta) Tarxien Rainbows)
11	FW	AZE	Asif Mammadov (to (Azerbaijan) Khazar Lankaran)
18	MF	SRB	Goran Arnaut (to (Hungary) Vasas)
24	MF	LAT	Andrejs Rubins (to (Azerbaijan) Qarabağ)
—	FW	BRA	Leo Rocha (to (Venezuela) Deportivo Lara)

=== Khazar Lankaran ===
In: Note: Flags indicate national team as defined under FIFA eligibility rules; some limited exceptions apply. Players may hold more than one non-FIFA nationality.

No.	Pos.	Nation	Player
2	DF	AZE	Elnur Allahverdiyev (from (Azerbaijan) Qarabağ)
8	MF	ROU	Constantin Arbănaș (from (Moldova) Sheriff Tiraspol)
9	FW	ARG	Diego Ruíz (from (Romania) CFR Cluj)
10	FW	AZE	Khagani Mammadov (from (Azerbaijan) FK Karvan)
11	FW	AZE	Asif Mammadov (from (Azerbaijan) Inter Baku)
21	DF	ROU	Adrian Iordache (to (Romania) Rapid București)
30	MF	ROU	Cătălin Doman (to (Romania) Argeș Pitești)
31	GK	LAT	Deniss Romanovs (to (Czech Republic) Slavia Prague)
55	MF	AZE	Tural Jalilov (from (Azerbaijan) Simurq)
77	MF	ROU	Stelian Stancu (to (Romania) Braşov)

Out: Note: Flags indicate national team as defined under FIFA eligibility rules; some limited exceptions apply. Players may hold more than one non-FIFA nationality.

No.	Pos.	Nation	Player
1	GK	AZE	Dmitriy Kramarenko (to (Azerbaijan) Inter Baku)
6	DF	CZE	Tomas Ineman
8	MF	BRA	Juninho (to (Azerbaijan) Baku)
9	FW	BUL	Ivan Tsvetkov (to (Bulgaria) Pirin Blagoevgrad)
10	MF	AZE	Jeyhun Sultanov (to (Azerbaijan) Ganja)
20	FW	MDA	Denis Calincov (to (Moldova) CSCA–Rapid Chişinău)
23	MF	AZE	Nizami Hajiyev (to (Azerbaijan) Inter Baku)
30	MF	BRA	Mario Sergio (to (Azerbaijan) Inter Baku)
72	MF	TUR	Devran Ayhan (to (Azerbaijan) Qarabağ)
77	DF	SVK	Ivan Pecha (to (Belarus) Neman Grodno)

=== FK Mughan ===
In: Note: Flags indicate national team as defined under FIFA eligibility rules; some limited exceptions apply. Players may hold more than one non-FIFA nationality.

No.	Pos.	Nation	Player

Out: Note: Flags indicate national team as defined under FIFA eligibility rules; some limited exceptions apply. Players may hold more than one non-FIFA nationality.

No.	Pos.	Nation	Player

=== MOIK Baku ===
In: Note: Flags indicate national team as defined under FIFA eligibility rules; some limited exceptions apply. Players may hold more than one non-FIFA nationality.

No.	Pos.	Nation	Player

Out: Note: Flags indicate national team as defined under FIFA eligibility rules; some limited exceptions apply. Players may hold more than one non-FIFA nationality.

No.	Pos.	Nation	Player

=== Neftchi Baku ===
In: Note: Flags indicate national team as defined under FIFA eligibility rules; some limited exceptions apply. Players may hold more than one non-FIFA nationality.

No.	Pos.	Nation	Player
3	DF	BRA	Denis Silva (from (Brazil) Grêmio)
5	DF	MKD	Igor Mitreski (from (Bulgaria) CSKA Sofia)
6	MF	MKD	Slavčo Georgievski (from (Cyprus) Ethnikos Achnas)
9	FW	BRA	Flavinho (from (Brazil) Grêmio Barueri)
10	FW	BEL	Émile Mpenza (from (Switzerland) Sion)
11	MF	AZE	Javid Huseynov (from (Azerbaijan) Inter Baku)
14	FW	UZB	Bahodir Nasimov (On loan from (Russia) Rubin Kazan)
16	MF	BRA	Alessandro (from (Brazil) Vitória)
25	MF	AZE	Javid Imamverdiyev (from (Azerbaijan) FK Karvan)

Out: Note: Flags indicate national team as defined under FIFA eligibility rules; some limited exceptions apply. Players may hold more than one non-FIFA nationality.

No.	Pos.	Nation	Player
1	GK	SRB	Vladimir Mićović
3	DF	TUR	Suat Usta (to (Turkey) Diyarbakırspor)
4	DF	EST	Taavi Rähn (from (Russia) Baltika Kaliningrad)
7	FW	AZE	Samir Aliyev (to (Azerbaijan) Simurq)
9	FW	URU	Walter Guglielmone (to (Paraguay) Club Guaraní)
10	MF	ROU	Marian Aliuță
16	DF	EST	Dmitri Kruglov (to (Azerbaijan) Inter Baku)
20	FW	BRA	José Carlos dos Reis
22	MF	AZE	Zaur Tagizade (Retired)
25	FW	ROU	Adrian Neaga (to (Romania) Unirea Urziceni)
26	MF	TKM	Nazar Baýramow (to (Uzbekistan) Qizilqum Zarafshon)
30	FW	CMR	Valentine Atem (to (Cameroon) Tiko United)
44	DF	GEO	Valeri Abramidze (to (Azerbaijan) Inter Baku)
—	FW	EST	Vladimir Voskoboinikov (to (Estonia) Levadia Tallinn)

=== Qarabağ ===
In: Note: Flags indicate national team as defined under FIFA eligibility rules; some limited exceptions apply. Players may hold more than one non-FIFA nationality.

No.	Pos.	Nation	Player
13	DF	AZE	Samir Abbasov (from (Azerbaijan) Inter Baku)
19	MF	LAT	Andrejs Rubins (from (Azerbaijan) Inter Baku)
25	DF	ALB	Ansi Agolli (loan from (Ukraine) Kryvbas Kryvyi Rih)
72	MF	TUR	Devran Ayhan (from (Azerbaijan) Khazar Lankaran)

Out: Note: Flags indicate national team as defined under FIFA eligibility rules; some limited exceptions apply. Players may hold more than one non-FIFA nationality.

No.	Pos.	Nation	Player
14	DF	AZE	Rashad Sadygov (to (Turkey) Eskişehirspor)

=== Simurq ===
In: Note: Flags indicate national team as defined under FIFA eligibility rules; some limited exceptions apply. Players may hold more than one non-FIFA nationality.

No.	Pos.	Nation	Player
—	DF	AZE	Sabuhi Hasanov (From (Azerbaijan) Baku)

Out: Note: Flags indicate national team as defined under FIFA eligibility rules; some limited exceptions apply. Players may hold more than one non-FIFA nationality.

No.	Pos.	Nation	Player
—	MF	AZE	Aleksandr Chertoganov (To (Azerbaijan) Inter Baku)

=== Turan ===
In: Note: Flags indicate national team as defined under FIFA eligibility rules; some limited exceptions apply. Players may hold more than one non-FIFA nationality.

No.	Pos.	Nation	Player

Out: Note: Flags indicate national team as defined under FIFA eligibility rules; some limited exceptions apply. Players may hold more than one non-FIFA nationality.

No.	Pos.	Nation	Player
