= Dmitri Kruglov =

Estonian footballer (born 1984)

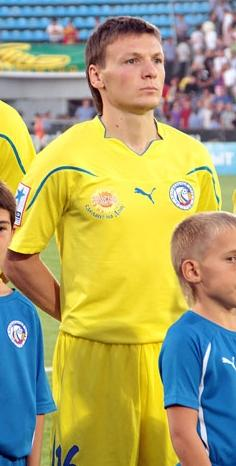
- Kruglov with Rostov in 2011

Personal information
- Date of birth: 24 May 1984 (age 42)
- Place of birth: Tapa, then part of Estonian SSR, Soviet Union
- Height: 1.72 m (5 ft 8 in)
- Positions: Left-back; winger

Youth career
- TJK

Senior career*
Years	Team	Apps	(Gls)
2000–2001	TJK-83 Tallinn	34	(5)
2001	HÜJK Emmaste	3	(1)
2002	TJK	27	(8)
2003	M.C. Tallinn	2	(3)
2003–2005	Levadia	59	(4)
2005–2008	Lokomotiv Moscow	10	(0)
2006	→ Kuban Krasnodar (loan)	0	(0)
2007	→ Torpedo Moscow (loan)	14	(0)
2008	→ Neftçi Baku (loan)	10	(2)
2008–2010	Neftçi Baku	53	(3)
2010–2011	Inter Baku	32	(2)
2011–2013	Rostov	18	(1)
2013–2014	Levadia	15	(4)
2014	Ravan Baku	6	(0)
2014–2015	Levadia	41	(10)
2016–2017	FCI Tallinn	66	(8)
2018–2020	FCI Levadia	96	(8)
2021	Maardu Linnameeskond	23	(1)
Total		509	(61)

International career
2002	Estonia U19	6	(1)
2003	Estonia U20	1	(0)
2003–2006	Estonia U21	8	(0)
2004–2019	Estonia	115	(4)
- * Club domestic league appearances and goals

Dmitri Kruglov (born 24 May 1984) is an Estonian retired professional footballer who played as a left-back and a winger. He made 115 appearances for the Estonia national team, scoring four goals.

He was known for his powerful shooting and often took free kicks and penalties.

== Club career ==
=== Early career ===
Kruglov came through the youth system at TJK.

=== Levadia ===
In 2003, Kruglov joined Meistriliiga club Levadia. He won his first Meistriliiga title in the 2004 season.

=== Lokomotiv Moscow ===
On 8 June 2005, Kruglov signed a five-year contract with Russian Premier League club Lokomotiv Moscow after a training stint with English club Sunderland. He made his debut in the Russian Premier League on 3 July 2005, in a 4–0 home victory over Terek Grozny.

In July 2006, Kruglov joined Russian First Division club Kuban Krasnodar on loan until the end of the season, making just one appearance in the Russian Cup. In July 2007, Kruglov went out on loan again, this time to Torpedo Moscow.

=== Neftçi Baku ===
On 29 February 2008, Kruglov joined Azerbaijan Premier League club Neftçi Baku on a three-month loan, after which he signed permanently.

=== Inter Baku ===
On 7 July 2010, Kruglov signed a one-year contract with Azerbaijan Premier League club Inter Baku. His contract was not renewed after the 2010–11 season.

=== Rostov ===
On 2 August 2011, Kruglov signed three-year contract with Russian Premier League side Rostov. He scored his first goal in the Russian Premier League on 18 September 2011, in a 1–1 home draw against CSKA Moscow.

=== Return to Levadia ===
On 31 July 2013, Kruglov returned to Estonia and rejoined Levadia. He won his second Meistriliiga title in the 2013 season.

=== Ravan Baku ===
On 7 March 2014, Kruglov signed a contract with Azerbaijani club Ravan Baku. On 20 April 2014, in a match against Gabala, Kruglov suffered a season-ending shoulder injury that required surgery. He left the club after the season.

=== Second return to Levadia ===
On 20 June 2014, Kruglov once again rejoined Levadia until the end of the season. He won his third Meistriliiga title in the 2014 season. On 5 March 2015, Kruglov signed a one-year contract extension that tied him to Levadia until the end of the 2015 season.

=== FCI Tallinn ===
On 14 December 2015, Kruglov signed a two-year contract with Meistriliiga club Infonet. He won his fourth Meistriliiga title in the 2016 season.

=== FCI Levadia ===
After the 2017 season, FCI Tallinn and Levadia merged their first teams, becoming FCI Levadia. On 4 January 2018, Kruglov signed a new one-year contract with FCI Levadia, with the option to extend the contract for another year. Released from club on 12 January 2021.

== International career ==
Kruglov began his youth career in 2002 with the Estonia under-19 team. He also represented the under-20 and under-21 national sides.

Kruglov made his senior international debut for Estonia on 13 October 2004, in a 2–2 draw against Latvia in a qualification match for the 2006 FIFA World Cup. He scored his first international goal from a penalty kick on 12 November 2005, in a 2–2 draw against Finland in a friendly. In 2011, Kruglov was the only player to appear in all 13 matches Estonia played that year. On 29 May 2016, he made his 100th appearance for Estonia, in a 0–2 away loss to Lithuania at the 2016 Baltic Cup.

== Career statistics ==
=== Club ===
As of 6 December 2018

Appearances and goals by club, season and competition
Club	Season	League			Cup (Note: Includes the Estonian Cup, Russian Cup and Azerbaijan Cup)		Europe		Other		Total	
Club	Season	Division	Apps	Goals	Apps	Goals	Apps	Goals	Apps	Goals	Apps	Goals
TJK-83 Tallinn	2000	III liiga	17	3	—		—		—		17	3
TJK-83 Tallinn	2001	II liiga	17	2	—		—				17	2
TJK-83 Tallinn	Total		34	5	—		—				34	5
HÜJK Emmaste	2001	Esiliiga	3	1			—				3	1
TJK	2002	Esiliiga	27	8	1	0	—		—		28	8
M.C. Tallinn	2003	Esiliiga	2	3	—		—		—		2	3
Levadia	2003	Meistriliiga	22	1	2	0	2 (Note: Appearances in UEFA Cup/UEFA Europa League)	0	—		26	1
Levadia	2004	Meistriliiga	23	0	6	1	4	0	1 (Note: Appearance in Estonian Supercup)	1	34	2
Levadia	2005	Meistriliiga	14	3	5	1	0	0	4 (Note: One appearance and one goal in Livonia Cup, three appearances in Commonwealth Cup)	1	23	5
Levadia	Total		59	4	13	2	6	0	5	2	83	8
Lokomotiv Moscow	2005	Russian Premier League	8	0	1	0	2	0	0	0	11	0
Lokomotiv Moscow	2006	Russian Premier League	2	0	0	0	0	0	—		2	0
Lokomotiv Moscow	Total		10	0	1	0	2	0	0	0	13	0
Kuban Krasnodar (loan)	2006	Russian First Division	0	0	1	0	—		—		1	0
Torpedo Moscow (loan)	2007	Russian First Division	14	0	0	0	—		—		14	0
Neftçi Baku (loan)	2007–08	Azerbaijan Premier League	10	2			0	0	—		10	2
Neftçi Baku	2008–09	Azerbaijan Premier League	24	2	1	1	5 (Note: Appearances in UEFA Intertoto Cup)	0	—		30	3
Neftçi Baku	2009–10	Azerbaijan Premier League	29	1	2	0	—		—		31	1
Neftçi Baku	Total		63	5	3	1	5	0	—		71	6
Inter Baku	2010–11	Azerbaijan Premier League	32	2	5	0	2 (Note: Appearances in UEFA Champions League)	0	6 (Note: Appearances in Commonwealth Cup)	1	45	3
Rostov	2011–12	Russian Premier League	18	1	2	0	—		2 (Note: Appearances in Russian Premier League relegation play-offs)	0	22	1
Levadia	2013	Meistriliiga	15	4	2	1	0	0	0	0	17	5
Ravan Baku	2013–14	Azerbaijan Premier League	6	0	2	0	—		—		8	0
Levadia	2014	Meistriliiga	10	5	0	0	0	0	0	0	10	5
Levadia	2015	Meistriliiga	31	5	3	0	2	0	0	0	36	5
Levadia	Total		41	10	3	0	2	0	0	0	46	10
FCI Tallinn	2016	Meistriliiga	34	4	2	0	2	0	—		38	4
FCI Tallinn	2017	Meistriliiga	32	4	3	1	2	0	1	0	38	5
FCI Tallinn	Total		66	8	5	1	4	0	1	0	76	9
FCI Levadia	2018	Meistriliiga	35	5	5	0	2	0	1	0	43	5
Career total			425	56	43	5	23	0	15	3	506	64

=== International ===
Appearances and goals by national team and year
National team	Year	Apps	Goals
Estonia	2004	4	0
Estonia	2005	12	1
Estonia	2006	5	0
Estonia	2007	11	0
Estonia	2008	6	0
Estonia	2009	10	0
Estonia	2010	10	0
Estonia	2011	13	0
Estonia	2012	9	0
Estonia	2013	10	1
Estonia	2014	5	1
Estonia	2015	4	0
Estonia	2016	7	1
Estonia	2017	3	0
Estonia	2018	5	0
Estonia	2019	1	0
Total		115	4

Scores and results list Estonia's goal tally first, score column indicates score after each Kruglov goal.

List of international goals scored by Dmitri Kruglov
No.	Date	Venue	Cap	Opponent	Score	Result	Competition
1	12 November 2005	Finnair Stadium, Helsinki, Finland	15	Finland	1–2	2–2	Friendly
2	14 August 2013	A. Le Coq Arena, Tallinn, Estonia	85	Latvia	1–0	1–1	Friendly
3	5 March 2014	Victoria Stadium, Gibraltar	91	Gibraltar	1–0	2–0	Friendly
4	1 June 2016	A. Le Coq Arena, Tallinn, Estonia	101	Andorra	1–0	2–0	Friendly

== Honours ==
FCI Levadia

- Meistriliiga: 2004, 2013, 2014
- Estonian Cup: 2003–04, 2004–05, 2017–18
- Estonian Supercup: 2018

Inter Baku

- Commonwealth Cup: 2011

FCI Tallinn

- Meistriliiga: 2016
- Estonian Cup: 2016–17
- Estonian Supercup: 2017

Individual

- Meistriliiga Player of the Month: June/July 2016

== See also ==
- List of footballers with 100 or more caps
