= Leonard Naidin =

Romanian footballer

Personal information
- Full name: Leonard Toni Marian Naidin
- Date of birth: 15 September 1979 (age 47)
- Place of birth: Timișoara, Romania
- Height: 1.83 m (6 ft 0 in)
- Position: Attacking midfielder

Team information
- Current team: ACS Ghiroda

Senior career*
Years	Team	Apps	(Gls)
1995–1996	Bihor Oradea	9	(0)
1998–2001	Politehnica Timișoara	57	(7)
2001–2003	Bihor Oradea	51	(8)
2003–2004	Dinamo București	8	(0)
2005–2007	Politehnica Timișoara	29	(0)
2007–2009	Politehnica Iaşi	43	(2)
2009–2011	Neftchi Baku	25	(1)
2011–2012	Mioveni	14	(0)
2012–2014	Millenium Giarmata	30	(9)
2014–2015	ASU Politehnica	36	(5)
2015–2016	Voința Mașloc		
2016–2017	Ghiroda	8	(0)
2018	Unirea Tomnatic	0	(0)
Total		310	(32)
- * Club domestic league appearances and goals as of 07:57, 11 May 2022 (UTC)

Leonard Toni Marian Naidin (born 15 September 1979) is a Romanian former football player who played as an attacking midfielder for teams such as FC Bihor Oradea, Politehnica Timișoara, Dinamo București, Politehnica Iaşi or Neftchi Baku, among others.

Although born in Timișoara, Naidin first played for FC Bihor Oradea during the 1995/1996 season in the Liga II. He moved to Poli Timișoara in 1998, only to return at FC Bihor three years later. He made his debut in the first league with the team in 2003 and transferred the very same season at to-be champions Dinamo Bucharest. Naidin came back home in January 2005, as new sponsors took control of Poli Timișoara.

In February 2007 he transferred to Politehnica Iași, joining his former coach Ionuţ Popa.
