= Nazar Baýramow =

Turkmen footballer

Personal information
- Birth name: Nazar Karadzhayevich Bayramov
- Date of birth: 4 September 1982 (age 44)
- Place of birth: Ashkhabad, Turkmen SSR, USSR (now Turkmenistan)
- Height: 1.80 m (5 ft 11 in)
- Position: Midfielder

Team information
- Current team: Altyn Tach
- Number: 77

Senior career*
| Years | Team | Apps | (Gls) |
| 1999–2000 | Köpetdag Aşgabat | | |
| 2000 | Access-Golden Grain | | |
| 2001 | Köpetdag Aşgabat | | |
| 2001 | Nisa Aşgabat | | |
| 2001 | Rubin Kazan | 0 | (0) |
| 2002 | Zhenis Astana | 14 | (1) |
| 2002–2004 | Vorskla Poltava | 20 | (0) |
| 2003–2004 | → Vorskla-2 Poltava | 3 | (0) |
| 2004–2007 | Karvan | 58 | (9) |
| 2007–2010 | Neftçi Baku | 47 | (0) |
| 2011 | Qizilqum Zarafshon | 11 | (0) |
| 2013 | Altyn Asyr | | |
| 2014 | Talyp Sporty | | |
| 2015 | HTTU Aşgabat | | |
| 2015 | Aşgabat. | | |
| 2016 | Ahal | | |
| 2017–2019 | Energetik Mary | | |
| 2026 | Altyn Tach | | |

International career^{‡}
| 2001–2016 | Turkmenistan | 31 | (4) |
- * Club domestic league appearances and goals as of 21 August 2021 ‡ National team caps and goals as of 1 December 2019

Nazar Karadzhayevich Bayramov or Nazar Karaýewiç Baýramow (Russian: Назар Караджаевич Байрамов, romanized: Nazar Karadzhayevich Bayramov; born 4 September 1982) is a former football player who last played as a midfielder for Turkmenistan. Bayramow is the younger brother of Wladimir Baýramow.

== Career ==
=== Club ===
Bayramov joined Access-Golden Grain in 2000, but failed to make an appearance for them before returning to Köpetdag Aşgabat.

Whilst playing for Zhenis Astana, Bayramov was banned for three-months after being registered as a Kazakhstani whilst playing for Turkmenistan.

During the 2002–03 winter break, Bayramov signed for Vorskla Poltava.

Baýramow left Aşgabat prior to the start of the 2020 season.

In September 2026, Baýramow returned to action by signing with Altyn Taç in the Ashgabat zone of the Turkmen First League. In his debut match against Oguzhan, played a day before his 44th birthday, he scored a hat-trick—including a goal within the first 40 seconds, to help his team secure a 7–1 victory.

=== International ===
Baýramow retired from International football with Turkmenistan on 8 August 2016, following Turkmenistan's 1–0 defeat to Oman at the Sultan Qaboos Sports Complex in Muscat, Oman.

== Personal life ==
Nazar Baýramow was born into a Turkmen-Russian family to parents Karadja and Natalya Bayramov.

His older brothers, Wladimir Baýramow, Murad, and Oleg, are also former professional footballers. Baýramow married in January 2005, and has three daughters with his wife Milana.

== Career statistics ==
=== Club ===
Appearances and goals by club, season and competition<
| Club | Season | League | | | National Cup | | Continental | | Other | | Total | |
| Club | Season | Division | Apps | Goals | Apps | Goals | Apps | Goals | Apps | Goals | Apps | Goals |
|---|---|---|---|---|---|---|---|---|---|---|---|---|
| Köpetdag Aşgabat | 1998–99 | Ýokary Liga | | | | | — | | — | | | |
| Köpetdag Aşgabat | 2000 | Ýokary Liga | | | | | — | | — | | | |
| Köpetdag Aşgabat | Total | | | | | | - | - | - | - | | |
| Access-Golden Grain | 2000 | Kazakhstan Premier League | 0 | 0 | 0 | 0 | — | | — | | 0 | 0 |
| Köpetdag Aşgabat | 2001 | Ýokary Liga | | | | | — | | — | | | |
| Nisa Aşgabat | 2001 | Ýokary Liga | | | | | — | | — | | | |
| Rubin Kazan | 2001 | Russian First Division | 0 | 0 | 0 | 0 | — | | — | | 0 | 0 |
| Zhenis Astana | 2002 | Kazakhstan Premier League | 14 | 1 | | | 0 (Note: Appearances in the UEFA Champions League) | 0 | — | | 14 | 1 |
| Vorskla Poltava | 2002–03 | Vyshcha Liha | 11 | 0 | | | — | | — | | 11 | 0 |
| Vorskla Poltava | 2003–04 | Vyshcha Liha | 9 | 0 | | | — | | — | | 9 | 0 |
| Vorskla Poltava | Total | | 20 | 0 | | | - | - | - | - | 20 | 0 |
| Karvan | 2004–05 | Azerbaijan Top League | 25 | 5 | | | — | | — | | 25 | 5 |
| Karvan | 2005–06 | Azerbaijan Top League | 25 | 4 | | | (Note: Appearances in the UEFA Intertoto Cup) | 0 | — | | 25 | 4 |
| Karvan | 2006–07 | Azerbaijan Top League | 8 | 1 | | | 4 (Note: Appearances in the UEFA Cup) | 0 | — | | 8 | 1 |
| Karvan | Total | | 58 | 9 | | | 4 | 0 | - | - | 62 | 9 |
| Neftçi Baku | 2007–08 | Azerbaijan Premier League | 14 | 0 | | | 2 | 0 | — | | 16 | 0 |
| Neftçi Baku | 2008–09 | Azerbaijan Premier League | 19 | 0 | | | 6 | 0 | — | | 25 | 0 |
| Neftçi Baku | 2009–10 | Azerbaijan Premier League | 14 | 0 | | | — | | — | | 14 | 0 |
| Neftçi Baku | Total | | 47 | 0 | | | 8 | 0 | - | - | 55 | 0 |
| Qizilqum Zarafshon | 2011 | Uzbek League | 11 | 0 | 1 | 0 | — | | — | | 12 | 0 |
| Altyn Asyr | 2013 | Ýokary Liga | | | | | — | | — | | | |
| Talyp Sporty | 2014 | Ýokary Liga | | | | | — | | — | | | |
| HTTU Aşgabat | 2015 | Ýokary Liga | | | | | — | | — | | | |
| Aşgabat | 2015 | Ýokary Liga | | | | | — | | — | | | |
| Ahal | 2016 | Ýokary Liga | | | | | — | | — | | | |
| Energetik Mary | 2017 | Ýokary Liga | | | | | — | | — | | | |
| Energetik Mary | 2018 | Ýokary Liga | | | | | — | | — | | | |
| Energetik Mary | 2019 | Ýokary Liga | | | | | — | | — | | | |
| Energetik Mary | Total | | | | | | - | - | - | - | | |
| Career total | | | | | | | - | - | - | - | | |

=== International ===
As of match played 8 August 2016

Appearances and goals by national team and year
| National team | Year | Apps | Goals |
|---|---|---|---|
| Turkmenistan | 2001 | 1 | 0 |
| Turkmenistan | 2002 | 0 | 0 |
| Turkmenistan | 2003 | 6 | 3 |
| Turkmenistan | 2004 | 8 | 1 |
| Turkmenistan | 2005 | 0 | 0 |
| Turkmenistan | 2006 | 0 | 0 |
| Turkmenistan | 2007 | 6 | 0 |
| Turkmenistan | 2008 | 5 | 0 |
| Turkmenistan | 2009 | 1 | 0 |
| Turkmenistan | 2010 | 2 | 0 |
| Turkmenistan | 2011 | 0 | 0 |
| Turkmenistan | 2012 | 0 | 0 |
| Turkmenistan | 2013 | 0 | 0 |
| Turkmenistan | 2014 | 0 | 0 |
| Turkmenistan | 2015 | 0 | 0 |
| Turkmenistan | 2016 | 2 | 0 |
| Total | | 31 | 4 |

Scores and results list Turkmenistan's goal tally first, score column indicates score after each Turkmenistan goal.

List of international goals scored by Nazar Baýramow
| No. | Date | Venue | Opponent | Score | Result | Competition | Ref. |
|---|---|---|---|---|---|---|---|
| 1 | 30 October 2003 | Sharjah Stadium, Sharjah, United Arab Emirates | United Arab Emirates | 1–0 | 1–1 | 2004 AFC Asian Cup qualification | |
| 2 | 12 November 2003 | Saparmurat Turkmenbashy Olympic Stadium, Ashgabat, Turkmenistan | Sri Lanka | 2–0 | 3–0 | 2006 FIFA World Cup qualification | |
| 3 | 19 November 2003 | Saparmurat Turkmenbashy Olympic Stadium, Ashgabat, Turkmenistan | Afghanistan | 4–0 | 11–0 | 2006 FIFA World Cup qualification | |
| 4 | 18 July 2004 | Chengdu Longquanyi Football Stadium, Chengdu, China | Saudi Arabia | 1–0 | 2–2 | 2004 AFC Asian Cup | |
