= Joe Kendrick (footballer, born 1983) =

Irish footballer

- Kendrick in 2007

Personal information
- Full name: Joseph Kendrick
- Date of birth: 26 June 1983 (age 43)
- Place of birth: Dublin, Ireland
- Positions: Centre-back; left-back

Senior career*
Years	Team	Apps	(Gls)
1999–2003	Newcastle United	0	(0)
2003–2004	1860 Munich	0	(0)
2004–2006	Darlington	70	(1)
2006	Torquay United	0	(0)
2006–2007	Tamworth	33	(0)
2007	Workington	34	(5)
2007–2008	Newcastle Blue Star	10	(4)
2008	Drogheda United	36	(1)
2008–2009	Neftchi Baku	15	(0)
2009–2010	Sligo Rovers	19	(0)
2010	Drogheda United	22	(5)
2011	Bray Wanderers	14	(1)
2011–2012	Mansfield Town	15	(0)
2012–2014	Blyth Spartans	87	(20)
2022–	North Shields O35s	45	(15)

International career
1999–2000	Republic of Ireland U21	1	(0)
- * Club domestic league appearances and goals

Joe Kendrick (born 26 June 1983) is an Irish former professional footballer who played as left back or centre back and is a Republic of Ireland under 21 international, Who currently plays for the mighty North Shields O35s

== Career ==
Kendrick started his career at Newcastle United as a promising young player and played youth and reserve team football and spent four years at St James' Park before moving on to TSV 1860 Munich in the summer of 2004. Kendrick started brightly at 1860 Munich before a Serious foot injury halted his progress.

Kendrick returned to England and played for Darlington at the end of the 2005–06 season and 2006–07 and went on to make over Seventy appearances for the Quakers.

Kendrick joined Torquay United on a short-term deal earlier in the summer of 2006 but left Plainmoor before even kicking a ball due to a problem gaining international clearance to play.

In September 2006 Kendrick joined Conference National side Tamworth, but left due to travelling problems from his home in Newcastle and left in January 2007 after only making 15 appearances for the club.

In January 2007, Kendrick joined Workington and quickly became a firm fans' favourite in which Workington had lost the services of two left backs during the 2006–07 season. Kendrick made his debut for Workington in the Conference North match against Hucknall Town on 27 January 2007.

Kendrick scored his first goal for Workington on 23 March 2007 against Nuneaton Borough with a spectacular 40-yard shot over the keeper into the net in the 2–0 win. On 14 January 2008, Kendrick was snapped up by then Irish champions Drogheda United on a three-year contract and went on to make 45 appearances and also play in the Champions League the same year.

In January 2009, Kendrick was signed by Azerbaijan Premier League giants Neftchi Baku on an 18-month contract, after manager Hans-Jürgen Gede had been on a scouting trip to League of Ireland. Shortly after Kendrick signed with Neftchi Baku, Gede was sacked and replaced by Boyukagha Aghayev, who promptly took a dislike to the foreign players at Neftchi and began forcing them out of the club. After a series of threatening phone-calls, with-held wages, misinformation about club commitments, Kendrick's contract was cancelled by Neftchi with no warning in June 2009. This resulted in Kendrick taking Neftchi Baku to CAS over unpaid wages and winning.

On 16 July 2009, Joe Kendrick signed for Sligo Rovers in the League of Ireland. Rovers finished runners-up in the FAI Ford Cup Final with Kendrick on the team.

In 2010, Kendrick re-signed for Drogheda United. Kendrick made his second debut for the club on 5 March 2010 in a 3–0 loss against UCD at United Park. His first goal in his second spell at Drogheda came from a penalty in a 2–2 draw against Dundalk.

In February 2011 Kendrick signed for Bray Wanderers.

In July 2011 it was reported that Kendrick had signed for Mansfield Town on a reported one-year contract.

On 1 February 2012, Kendrick joined Blyth Spartans on loan for the remainder of the season. That summer, 25 July 2012, Kendrick Joined Blyth permanently for the 2012–13 season and would go on to make a total of 80 Appearances whilst Scoring 20 Goals.

On 30 July 2014, Kendrick joined Bedlington Terriers, leaving them less than a week later on 7 August 2014 .

On 23 June 2015, Kendrick signed for West Auckland Town.

== Personal ==
His great uncle Joe Kendrick Sr. was also a notable footballer and played international football for the Irish Free State during the 1920s and 1930s and also played for Everton.
