= 2003–04 Estonian Cup =

Eesti Karikas

Tournament details
- Country: Estonia
- Teams: 20

Final positions
- Champions: Levadia
- Runners-up: TVMK

Tournament statistics
- Matches played: 25
- Goals scored: 116 (4.64 per match)

The 2003–04 Estonian Cup (Estonian: Eesti Karikas) was the 14th season of the Estonian football knockout tournament. Winners of the cup qualified for the 2004–05 UEFA Cup first qualifying round.

The competition culminated with the final held at Kadriorg Stadium, Tallinn on 20 May 2004 with Levadia taking the title 3–0 against the defending champion TMVK.

All in all, 20 teams took part of the competition.

== First round ==
Team 1	Score	Team 2
9 September
Hansa United	1–3	Elva
Sörve	5–0	Eston Villa
HÜJK	2–6	Tammeka
Toompea	0–5	Dünamo

== Second round ==
Team 1	Score	Team 2
8 November
F.C.A. Estel	0–4	TVMK
Lootus^{1}	3–0	Tulevik
Dünamo	2–3	Narva Trans
Tammeka	1–9	Flora
Sörve	0–2	Kuressaare
TJK	0–2	Valga
Tervis Pärnu	0–2	Levadia Maardu^{2}
9 November
Elva	0–9	Levadia Tallinn^{3}

Notes

- ^{1} Lootus were renamed to Alutaguse Lootus during the winter break.
- ^{2} Levadia Maardu were relocated to Tallinn and were renamed to Levadia Tallinn during the winter break.
- ^{3} Levadia Tallinn were renamed to Levadia II Tallinn during the winter break.

== Quarter-finals ==
The first legs were played between 18 and 20 March 2004, and the second legs on 14 and 15 April 2004.

Team 1	Agg.	Team 2	1st leg	2nd leg
Flora	7–1	Levadia II	3–0	4–1
TVMK	13–2	Kuressaare	3–0	10–2
Levadia	6–0	Alutaguse Lootus	3–0	3–0
Narva Trans	6–1	Valga	3–1	3–0

== Semi-finals ==
The first legs were played on 29 April 2004, and the second legs on 12 May 2004.

Team 1	Agg.	Team 2	1st leg	2nd leg
Levadia	5–4	Flora	5–2	0–2
Narva Trans	4–5	TVMK	4–2	0–3

== Final ==
20 May 2004	Levadia	3–0	TVMK	Tallinn
	Dovydenas 10'; Voskoboinikov 16'; Nahk 90'			Stadium: Kadrioru staadion Attendance: 350; Referee: Raivo Lattik
