= Tomasz Bobel =

Polish footballer

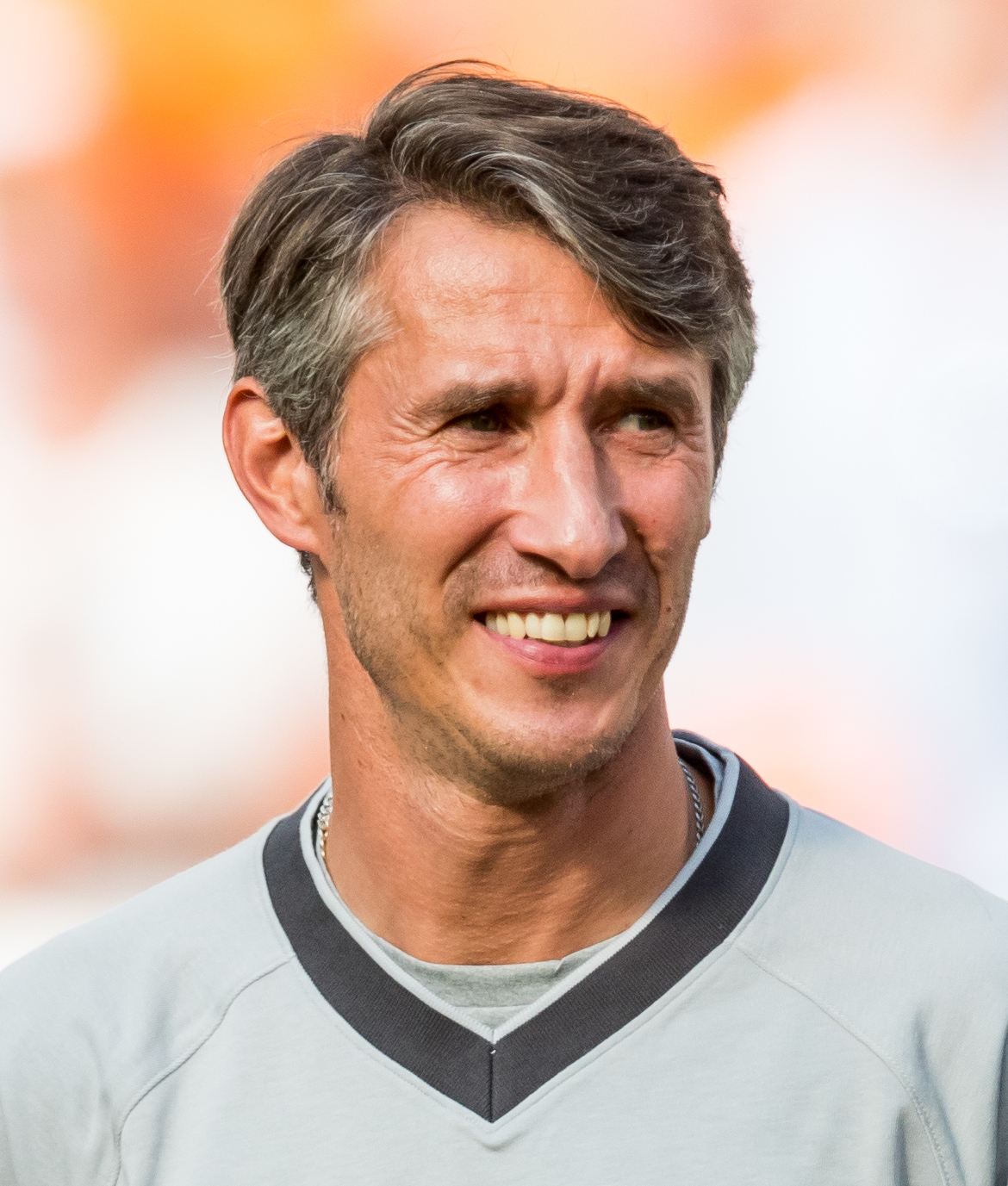
- Bobel in 2019

Personal information
- Full name: Tomasz Bobel
- Date of birth: 29 December 1974 (age 51)
- Place of birth: Wrocław, Poland
- Height: 1.87 m (6 ft 1 1/2 in)
- Position: Goalkeeper

Senior career*
Years	Team	Apps	(Gls)
1993–1998	Śląsk Wrocław		
1998–2000	Fortuna Köln	58	(0)
2000–2003	MSV Duisburg	17	(0)
2004–2008	Erzgebirge Aue	86	(0)
2009	Neftchi Baku	3	(0)
2009–2011	Bayer Leverkusen	0	(0)
2012–2014	Bayer Leverkusen II	2	(0)
Total		166	(0)
- * Club domestic league appearances and goals

Tomasz Bobel (born 29 December 1974 in Wrocław) is a Polish former professional footballer who played as a goalkeeper.
