= Valeri Abramidze =

Georgian footballer

Personal information
- Full name: Valeri Buduyevich Abramidze
- Date of birth: 17 January 1980 (age 46)
- Place of birth: Tbilisi, Georgian SSR
- Height: 1.85 m (6 ft 1 in)
- Position: Defender

Team information
- Current team: Rustavi

Senior career*
Years	Team	Apps	(Gls)
1997–1998	Dinamo Tbilisi	1	(0)
1999	FC Tbilisi	13	(0)
1999–2000	Locomotive Tbilisi	27	(1)
2000–2002	Torpedo Kutaisi	43	(1)
2002–2004	Spartak Moscow	15	(0)
2003	→ Uralan Elista (loan)	7	(0)
2004	Khimki	14	(1)
2005–2006	Neftchi Baku	29	(4)
2006–2007	Khazar Lenkoran	21	(0)
2007–2008	Anzhi Makhachkala	39	(3)
2009	Dynamo Barnaul	12	(1)
2009–2010	Neftchi Baku	13	(3)
2010–2013	Inter Baku	55	(1)
2013–2014	Sioni Bolnisi	24	(4)
2014–2015	Torpedo Kutaisi	12	(0)

International career
1999–2001	Georgia U21	15	(1)
2001–2003	Georgia	6	(0)

Managerial career
- 2022–: Rustavi
- * Club domestic league appearances and goals

Valeri Abramidze (Georgian: ვალერი აბრამიძე; born 17 January 1980) is a former Georgian footballer. He also holds Russian citizenship.

== Spartak Moscow ==
Abramidze joined FC Spartak Moscow during summer 2002, signing a 5-year contract. He made 15 league appearances for Spartak, and 4 2002 UEFA Champions League as well, scoring no goals.

Being loaned out to FC Uralan Elista in 2003, he left Spartak for FC Khimki in 2004.

== Khazar scandal ==
During 2007 summer mid-season, Abramidze had major issues leaving FK Khazar Lenkoran. While Abramidze was sure he had signed a one-year contract in 2006 and was now a free agent, FK Khazar Lenkoran authorities told him that he'd signed a contract that was 2-year long. The problem seemed to be with contract in Azeri language while Abramidze did not know Azeri and had not had a translated version.

As a result, Abramidze had lost a lot of time while trying to be transferred to Anzhi, so the club could not include him into the signing list for Russian First Division in 2007. That's why Abramidze was out of football from September 2007 to the season 2008.

== Coach ==
In May 2022, Valeri Abramidze was appointed as a caretaker coach at Rustavi for a few weeks. The next five months he worked at the club as an assistant head coach before becoming an interim head coach in early November 2022.
