= Volodymyr Olefir =

Ukrainian footballer (born 1980)

Personal information
- Full name: Volodymyr Andriyovych Olefir
- Date of birth: 26 February 1980 (age 46)
- Place of birth: Poltava, Ukrainian SSR, Soviet Union
- Height: 1.85 m (6 ft 1 in)
- Position: Defender

Senior career*
Years	Team	Apps	(Gls)
1997–2000	Vorskla Poltava	0	(0)
1997–2000	→ Vorskla-2 Poltava	48	(1)
2001	Agro Chişinău	7	(0)
2002	Lukor Kalush	1	(0)
2002–2003	Prykarpattya Ivano-Frankivsk	4	(0)
2003–2004	Spartak-Horobyna Sumy	5	(0)
2004–2006	Vorskla Poltava	15	(0)
2006	Kryvbas Kryvyi Rih	13	(1)
2007	Illichivets Mariupol	12	(0)
2007	→ Illichivets-2 Mariupol	1	(0)
2007–2008	Naftovyk Okhtyrka	7	(1)
2008–2009	Neftchi Baku	14	(1)
2009	PFC Oleksandria	1	(0)
2010–2011	Obolon	3	(0)
2010	→ Bukovyna Chernivtsi (loan)	12	(0)
2011	Hoverla-Zakarpattia	3	(0)
2011–2012	Bukovyna Chernivtsi	9	(0)
2012	MFC Mykolaiv	13	(0)
2012–2013	Zirka Kirovohrad	7	(0)
2013	Kremin	16	(1)
- * Club domestic league appearances and goals

Volodymyr Andriyovych Olefir (born 26 February 1980) is a Ukrainian former football defender.

== Career ==
Olefir has played for many clubs. He started in Vorksla-2 Poltava and continued through Agro Chişinău, Lukor Kalush, Prykarpattya Ivano-Frankivsk, Spartak-Horobyna Sumy, FC Vorskla-Naftohaz Poltava, Vorskla Poltava, Kryvbas Kryvyi Rih, Ilichyvets Mariupol and so on.
