= Taavi Rähn =

Estonian footballer

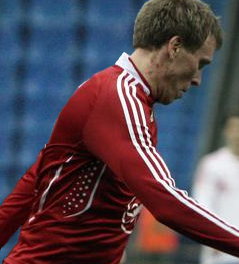
- Rähn in 2007

Personal information
- Full name: Taavi Rähn
- Date of birth: 16 May 1981 (age 45)
- Place of birth: Pärnu, then part of Estonian SSR, Soviet Union
- Height: 1.93 m (6 ft 4 in)
- Position: Defender

Youth career
- KEK Pärnu
- Vaprus
- Pärnu

Senior career*
| Years | Team | Apps | (Gls) |
| 1999 | Lelle | 27 | (0) |
| 2000–2001 | Tulevik | 29 | (0) |
| 2002–2003 | Flora | 21 | (1) |
| 2003–2006 | Volyn Lutsk | 55 | (3) |
| 2007–2009 | Ekranas | 56 | (3) |
| 2009–2010 | Neftçi Baku | 19 | (0) |
| 2010–2011 | Baltika Kaliningrad | 10 | (0) |
| 2011–2012 | Tianjin Songjiang | 45 | (2) |
| 2013 | Hunan Billows | 4 | (0) |
| 2013 | Jaro | 2 | (0) |
| 2013–2014 | Flora | 33 | (4) |
| 2015 | Levadia | 23 | (1) |
| 2016 | Paide Linnameeskond | 29 | (3) |

International career^{‡}
| 1995 | Estonia U16 | 2 | (0) |
| | Estonia U17 | 5 | (0) |
| 1998–1999 | Estonia U19 | 7 | (0) |
| 1999–2003 | Estonia U21 | 20 | (0) |
| 2001–2014 | Estonia | 74 | (0) |
- * Club domestic league appearances and goals as of 18 January 2017 ‡ National team caps and goals as of 18 January 2017

Taavi Rähn (born 16 May 1981) is a retired Estonian professional footballer. He played in the position of a centre-back.

== Club career ==
He started his professional career with Flora as a centre-back, then moved on to Ukrainian Premier League club Volyn Lutsk.

In 2006, he joined Lithuanian side Ekranas.

In 2010, he was on trial at Qingdao Jonoon of the Chinese Super League.

In March 2011, he signed a deal with China League One club Tianjin Songjiang.

In January 2013, he signed with Chinese League One club Hunan Billows on a free transfer.

== International career ==
Rähn made his debut for the Estonia national football team in 2001. He scored an own goal playing against England on 13 October 2007, in an attempt to clear the ball from outside his own box, he cleanly headed Ashley Cole's cross onto his own post, and past keeper and teammate Mart Poom. He made a total of 74 appearances for the senior national side.

== Honours ==
Flora

- Meistriliiga: 2002, 2003
- Estonian Supercup: 2014

Ekranas

- A Lyga: 2008, 2009

Levadia

- Estonian Supercup: 2015
