= Vladimir Voskoboinikov =

Estonian footballer (born 1983)

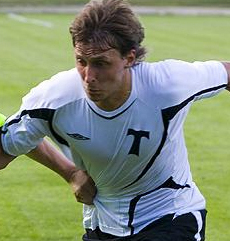
- Voskoboinikov with Torpedo Moscow in 2008

Personal information
- Full name: Vladimir Voskoboinikov
- Date of birth: 2 February 1983 (age 43)
- Place of birth: Tallinn, then part of Estonian SSR, Soviet Union
- Height: 1.88 m (6 ft 2 in)
- Position: Centre forward

Youth career
- 1991–2001: Puuma

Senior career*
Years	Team	Apps	(Gls)
2001–2004	Levadia	80	(25)
2004–2006	Brussels	8	(0)
2005	→ Eupen (loan)	8	(1)
2006	Levadia	8	(4)
2007–2008	Torpedo Moscow	50	(12)
2009	Syrianska	17	(2)
2009	Luch-Energiya Vladivostok	8	(0)
2010	Neftchi Baku	9	(1)
2010–2011	Levadia	0	(0)
2011–2012	Khimki	39	(4)
2012	Dinamo Tbilisi	13	(1)
2013–2015	Nõmme Kalju	43	(28)
2014	→ Qingdao Hainiu (loan)	28	(5)
2016–2017	Infonet	59	(20)

International career
2000	Estonia U19	1	(0)
2001–2003	Estonia U21	9	(0)
2007–2013	Estonia	36	(4)
- * Club domestic league appearances and goals as of 18 November 2017

Vladimir Voskoboinikov (born 2 February 1983) is a retired Estonian professional footballer who played as a centre forward.

== Club career ==
Voskoboinikov began his career at Puuma in Estonia where he played from 1991 until 2000.

At the age of 18, Voskoboinikov continued his professional career with Levadia. He had a spell in Belgium with Jupiler League club Brussels and a short loan at Eupen before he moving back to Estonia.

He was initially on loan at Russian First Division club Torpedo Moscow, but in July 2007, he signed a two-year contract.

On 27 March 2009, he joined Swedish Superettan side Syrianska. Although he still had a running contract with FC Torpedo, he was given a free transfer, due to the rule that disallowing foreign players in the Russian Second Division.

In January 2010, he joined Azerbaijan Premier League club Neftchi Baku.

In August 2010, he joined Levadia.

In February 2011, he joined Khimki.

=== Statistics ===
Season	League level	Team	League		Reserves		Cup		Europe	
Season	League level	Team	Games	Goals	Games	Goals	Games	Goals	Games	Goals
2001	1	Levadia	0	0	27	6				
2002	1	Levadia	0	0	14	5				
2003	1	Levadia	4	0	17	5				
2004	1	Levadia	18	9	0	0				
2004–05	1	Brussels	8	0					—	—
2004–05	2	Eupen	8	1					—	—
2005–06	1	Brussels	0	0					—	—
2006	1	Levadia	8	4						
2007	2	Torpedo	26	9					—	—
2008	2	Torpedo	24	3					—	—
2009	2	Syrianska	17	2					—	—
2009	2	Luch-Energiya	8	0					—	—
2009–10	1	Neftchi Baku	9	1			2	0	—	—
2010	1	Levadia	0	0	0	0				
2011	1	Levadia	0	0	0	0				
2011	2	Khimki	30	4			2	1		
2012	2	Khimki	9	0						
2012–13	1	Dinamo Tbilisi	13	1			2	5		
2013	1	Kalju	31	23			1	3		
2014	2	Qingdao Hainiu	28	5			3	1		
As of 11 November 2014.

== International career ==
Voskoboinikov has been capped 36 times For Estonia, scoring 4 goals. He made his national team debut on 2 June 2007 against Croatia in a UEFA Euro 2008 qualification. He scored his first national team goal on 18 November 2008, in a 1–0 victory over Moldova in a Mayors Cup match.

=== International goals ===
#	Date	Venue	Opponent	Score	Result	Competition
1	18 November 2008	Lilleküla Stadium, Tallinn, Estonia	Moldova	1–0	1–0	Mayors Cup
2	6 June 2009	Lilleküla Stadium, Tallinn, Estonia	Equatorial Guinea	2–0	3–0	Friendly
3	5 September 2009	Kadir Has Stadium, Kayseri, Turkey	Turkey	1–0	2–4	2010 FIFA World Cup qualification
4	3 June 2012	Tamme Stadium, Tartu, Estonia	Lithuania	1–0	1–0	2012 Baltic Cup
Correct as of 13 January 2017

== Honours ==
=== Club ===
Levadia

- Meistriliiga: 2004, 2006
- Estonian Cup: 2001–02, 2003–04

Brussels

- Belgian Second Division: 2003–04

Nõmme Kalju

- Estonian Cup: 2014–15

FCI Tallinn

- Meistriliiga: 2016
- Estonian Supercup: 2017

=== Individual ===
- Meistriliiga Player of the Month: May 2013
- Meistriliiga top scorer: 2013
