= Elmar Bakhshiyev =

Azerbaijani footballer (born 1980)

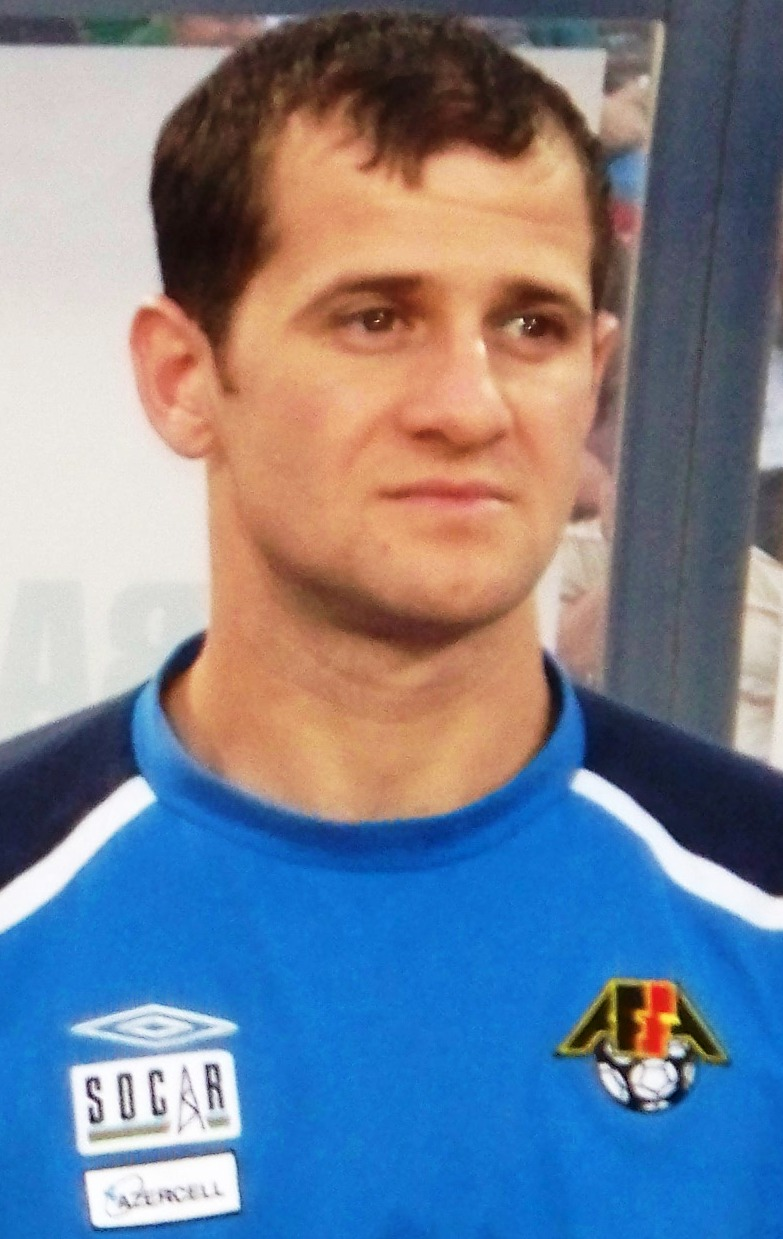
- Bakhshiyev in 2009

Personal information
- Date of birth: 3 August 1980 (age 46)
- Place of birth: Qusar, Azerbaijan SSR, Soviet Union
- Height: 1.75 m (5 ft 9 in)
- Position: Midfielder

Senior career*
Years	Team	Apps	(Gls)
2003–2004	Khazar Universiteti Baku	23	(0)
2004–2007	Inter Baku	74	(1)
2007–2008	Khazar Lenkoran	25	(2)
2008–2011	Neftchi Baku	53	(3)
2011–2014	Gabala	28	(0)
Total		180	(6)

International career
2004–2014	Azerbaijan	30	(0)

Managerial career
- 2019–2024: Gabala
- 2024–2025: Araz-Naxçıvan
- * Club domestic league appearances and goals

Elmar Bakhshiyev (Azerbaijani: Elmar Baxşiyev; born 3 August 1980) is an Azerbaijani football manager and former midfielder of Lezgin origin.

== Club career ==
On 19 January 2012 Bakhshiev signed an initial one-year contract with Gabala. On 25 March 2014, Bakhshiev announced that he would be retiring at the end of the 2013–14 season.

== Managerial career ==
On 2 September 2019, Bakhshiyev was appointed as acting Head Coach of Gabala after Sanan Gurbanov resigned. On 12 June 2023, Bakhshiyev extended his contract as Head Coach of Gabala until the summer of 2025.

On 24 February 2024, Bakhshiyev resigned as Head Coach of Gabala following a 2–1 defeat to Kapaz the previous day that left Gabala eight points a drift at the bottom of the league.

On 29 May 2024, Bakhshiyev was announced as the Head Coach of Araz-Naxçıvan for the 2024–25 season.

== Career statistics ==
=== Club ===
As of 19 May 2012

Club performance			League		Cup		Continental		Total	
Season	Club	League	Apps	Goals	Apps	Goals	Apps	Goals	Apps	Goals
Azerbaijan			League		Azerbaijan Cup		Europe		Total	
2003–04	Khazar Universiteti Baku	Azerbaijan Premier League	23	0			—		23	0
2004–05	Inter Baku	Azerbaijan Premier League	30	1			—		30	1
2005–06	Inter Baku	Azerbaijan Premier League	22	0			—		22	0
2006–07	Inter Baku	Azerbaijan Premier League	22	1			—		22	1
2007–08	Khazar Lankaran	Azerbaijan Premier League	25	2	8	1	2	0	35	3
2008–09	Khazar Lankaran	Azerbaijan Premier League	0	0	0	0	2	0	2	0
2008–09	Neftchi Baku	Azerbaijan Premier League	24	3			—		24	3
2009–10	Neftchi Baku	Azerbaijan Premier League	20	0			—		20	0
2010–11	Neftchi Baku	Azerbaijan Premier League	9	0	1	0	—		10	0
2011–12	Gabala	Azerbaijan Premier League	9	0	0	0	—		9	0
2012–13	Gabala	Azerbaijan Premier League	19	0	0	0	—		19	0
2013–14	Gabala	Azerbaijan Premier League	0	0	0	0	—		0	0
Total	Azerbaijan		203	6	1	0	4	0	208	6
Career total			203	6	1	0	4	0	208	6

=== International ===
Azerbaijan
Year	Apps	Goals
2004	2	0
2005	3	0
2006	5	0
2007	8	0
2008	8	0
2009	6	0
Total	32	0

Statistics accurate as of match played 9 June 2009

=== Manager ===
Managerial record by team and tenure
Team	From	To	Record					Ref
Team	From	To	P	W	D	L	Win %	Ref
Gabala	2 September 2019	24 February 2024	155	52	41	62	33.5	
Total			155	52	41	62	33.5	—

== Career honours ==
=== Player ===
Khazar Lankaran

- Azerbaijan Cup: 2007–08

Neftchi Baku

- Azerbaijan Premier League: 2010–11

=== Manager ===
Gabala

- Azerbaijan Cup: 2022–23
