= Marcho Dafchev =

Bulgarian footballer

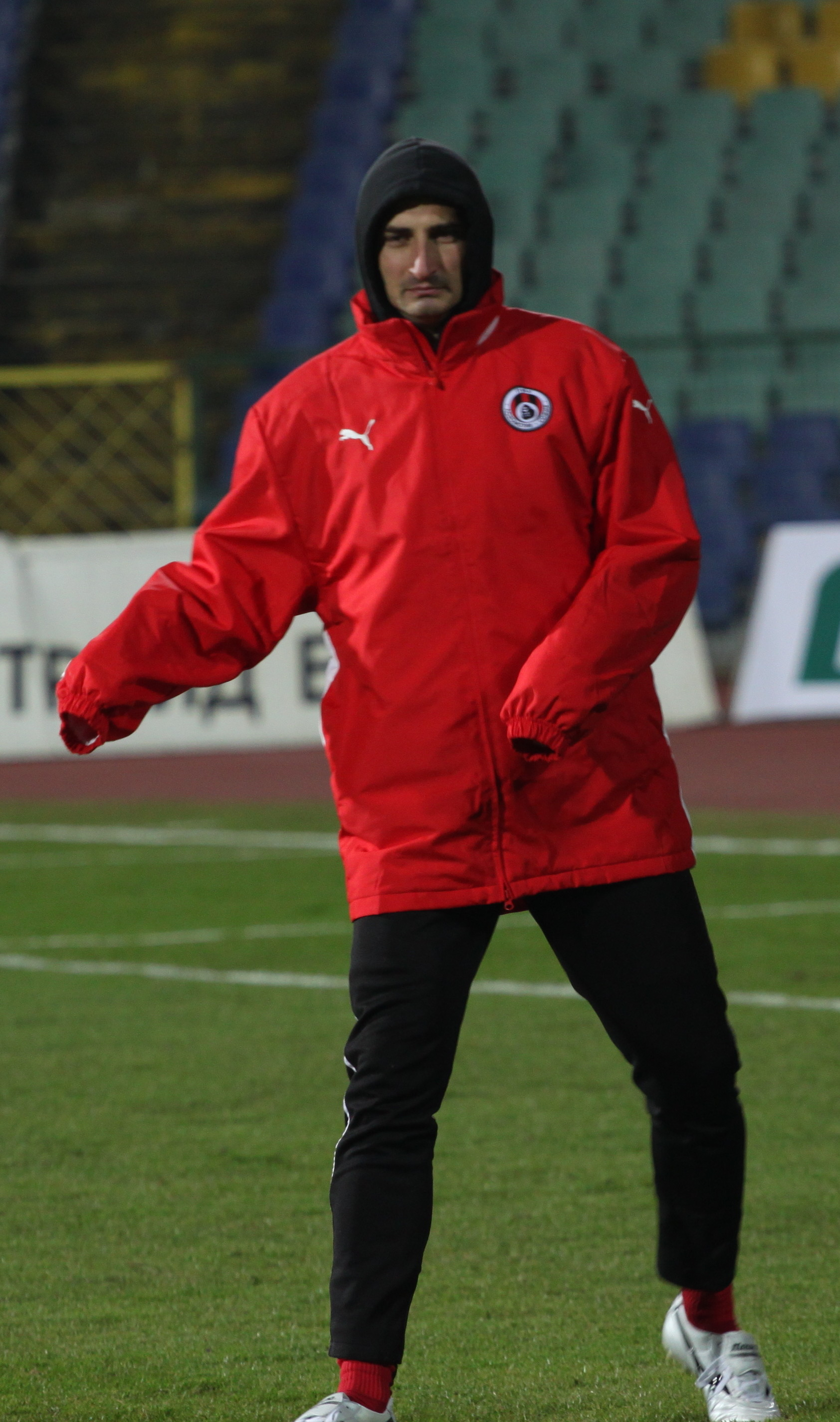

Personal information
- Full name: Marcho Petrov Dafchev
- Date of birth: 12 May 1978 (age 48)
- Place of birth: Plovdiv, Bulgaria
- Height: 1.85 m (6 ft 1 in)
- Position: Attacking midfielder

Youth career
- Maritsa Plovdiv

Senior career*
Years	Team	Apps	(Gls)
1996–1998	Sokol Komatevo		
1998–2001	Lokomotiv Sofia	84	(16)
2002	CSKA Sofia	6	(0)
2002–2003	A.O. Patraikos	6	(0)
2003–2004	Botev Plovdiv	24	(9)
2004–2008	Lokomotiv Sofia	97	(28)
2008–2009	Neftchi Baku	12	(2)
2009–2013	Lokomotiv Sofia	55	(11)
Total		284	(66)

International career
2005	Bulgaria	1	(0)

Managerial career
- 2013–2014: Eurocollege
- 2014–2017: Botev Plovdiv (youth coach)
- 2017–2019: Bulgaria U17
- 2020–2022: Lokomotiv Plovdiv (youth coach)
- 2022: Atletik Kuklen
- 2023–2024: Chernomorets Burgas (assistant)
- 2024: Etar Veliko Tarnovo (assistant)
- * Club domestic league appearances and goals

Marcho Petrov Dafchev (Bulgarian: Марчо Дафчев; born 12 May 1978 in Plovdiv) is a Bulgarian football manager and a former professional footballer who played as an attacking midfielder.

He has been capped by Bulgaria once in 2005. Dafchev previously played for Sokol Komatevo, CSKA Sofia, Patraikos in Greece, Botev Plovdiv and Neftchi Baku in Azerbaijan.

== Career ==
Born in Plovdiv to Peter Dafchev, Dafchev was in the youth setups of Maritsa before moving to Sokol Komatevo.

In June 1998, at the age of 20, he joined Lokomotiv Sofia. Dafchev made his debut during the 1998–99 season on 8 August 1998 in a 1–3 away loss against Litex Lovech, coming on as a substitute for Ivaylo Pargov. He scored his first goal for Lokomotiv in a 1–0 home win against Levski Kyustendil on 17 October 1998. Dafchev made 27 league appearances and a total of 34 matches scoring eight goals during his debut season with the Railwaymen.

He left Lokomotiv for CSKA Sofia during the January 2002 transfer window, but earned only 6 appearances in the A PFG and was released just five months later, signing a contract with Greek side A.O. Patraikos.

In July 2003, Dafchev joined Botev Plovdiv. He made his debut on the opening day of the 2003–04 season in a 1–0 win over Rodopa Smolyan on 9 August. Twenty days later Dafchev scored his first Botev and Plovdiv derby goal, opening the scoring in a 2–3 defeat against Lokomotiv Plovdiv. On 28 September he scored twice in a 3–1 home victory over CSKA Sofia. Dafchev made 24 appearances for the Canaries, scoring nine goals, but Botev were relegated from the A PFG at the end of the campaign. In the summer of 2004, Dafchev signed for his previously team Lokomotiv Sofia. On 10 August 2006, he scored his first ever European goal, netting a free-kick against Bnei Yehuda Tel Aviv in a 2–0 away win. On 14 September, Dafchev scored free-kick and in a 2–2 home draw against Feyenoord. The following 2007–08 season he netted his third European goal in a 3–1 home win over Oţelul Galaţi of the UEFA Cup on 16 August 2007. In a 3–1 league win over Pirin Blagoevgrad on 11 November 2007, Dafchev scored his 49th and 50th goals in all competitions for Lokomotiv.

In May 2008, Dafchev was sold to Neftchi Baku. He passed his medical on 29 May and signed a three-year contract. He earned 12 appearances in the Azerbaijan Premier League and scored two goals.

On 15 August 2009, Dafchev returned to Lokomotiv Sofia after being released from his contract at Neftchi Baku. During the 2009–10 season he scored once in a 2–4 away loss against Cherno More on 7 November 2009. At the end of the following 2010–11 season, Dafchev became the club's second topscorer with 7 goals in 19 appearances and provided 6 assists for his team-mates.

== Coaching career ==
Marcho Dafchev started his coaching career during the 2013–14 season when he was appointed as head coach of Eurocollege in the 3rd division. In the next season Dafchev joined the youth academy of his former club Botev Plovdiv as a coach of the children born in 2003. On 1 June 2015 his team won the championship after 0–1 away win over Lokomotiv Plovdiv.

== Career statistics ==
As of 12 June 2011

Club	Season	League		Cup		Europe		Total	
Club	Season	Apps	Goals	Apps	Goals	Apps	Goals	Apps	Goals
Lokomotiv Sofia	1998–99	27	5	7	3	–	–	34	8
Lokomotiv Sofia	1999–00	25	3	3	0	–	–	28	3
Lokomotiv Sofia	2000–01	20	6	4	2	–	–	24	8
Lokomotiv Sofia	2001–02	12	2	1	0	–	–	13	2
CSKA Sofia	2001–02	6	0	3	0	0	0	9	0
A.O. Patraikos	2002–03	6	0	0	0	–	–	6	0
Botev Plovdiv	2003–04	24	9	3	1	–	–	27	10
Lokomotiv Sofia	2004–05	26	5	1	0	–	–	27	5
Lokomotiv Sofia	2005–06	25	5	0	0	–	–	25	5
Lokomotiv Sofia	2006–07	20	5	0	0	5	2	25	7
Lokomotiv Sofia	2007–08	26	13	3	2	4	2	33	17
Neftchi Baku	2008–09	12	2	0	0	–	–	12	2
Lokomotiv Sofia	2009–10	14	1	1	0	–	–	15	1
Lokomotiv Sofia	2010–11	19	7	0	0	–	–	19	7
Lokomotiv Sofia	2011–12	14	2	0	0	2	0	16	2
Career totals		268	64	26	8	11	4	305	76
