= Eshgin Guliyev =

Azerbaijani footballer (born 1990)

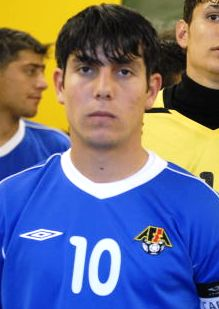

Personal information
- Full name: Eshgin Guliyev
- Date of birth: 11 December 1990 (age 35)
- Place of birth: Julfa, Azerbaijan Soviet Socialist Republic, Soviet Union (now Azerbaijan)
- Height: 1.76 m (5 ft 9 in)
- Position: Midfielder

Team information
- Current team: Shuvalan
- Number: 21

Senior career*
Years	Team	Apps	(Gls)
2006–2013	Neftchi Baku	20	(0)
2010–2011	→ Absheron (loan)	?	(?)
2011–2012	→ Sumgayit (loan)	18	(2)
2013–2014	Araz	13	(1)
2015–2017	Qaradağ Lökbatan		
2017–	Shuvalan		

International career^{‡}
2005–2007	Azerbaijan U17	6	(1)
2007–2009	Azerbaijan U19	7	(2)
2009–2013	Azerbaijan U21	9	(0)
2013–	Azerbaijan	1	(0)
- * Club domestic league appearances and goals as of 3 October 2017 ‡ National team caps and goals as of 1 February 2013

Eshgin Guliyev (born 11 December 1990) is an Azerbaijani football midfielder who plays for Shuvalan in the Azerbaijan First Division.

== Playing career ==
Guliyev played for Neftchi Baku in the 2008 UEFA Intertoto Cup.

He has appeared in four matches for the Azerbaijan national under-21 football team, including qualifiers for the 2009 U-21 Championship.

In the match against Albania, on 5 September 2009, he scored an own goal, which ended up deciding the match, as Azerbaijan lost 1–0.

Guliyev held the number 23 shirt in 2008, until the following season when he was awarded the number 6.
