= Hans-Jürgen Gede =

German football coach and former player (born 1956)

Personal information
- Full name: Hans-Jürgen Gede
- Date of birth: 14 November 1956 (age 69)
- Place of birth: Gelsenkirchen, West Germany
- Height: 1.73 m (5 ft 8 in)
- Position: Midfielder

Team information
- Current team: Viettel (Technical director)

Senior career*
| Years | Team | Apps | (Gls) |
| 1975–1977 | Schalke 04 | 33 | (2) |
| 1977–1979 | Preußen Münster | 72 | (10) |
| 1979–1991 | Fortuna Köln | 344 | (48) |
| Total | | 449 | (60) |

Managerial career
- 1991–1992: Fortuna Düsseldorf
- 1993–1994: Persepolis (Assistant)
- 1994: Persepolis
- 1994–1995: Iran U23
- 1996–1997: KSV Hessen Kassel
- 1998: Iran (Technical director)
- 1999–2001: SV Lippstadt
- 2001–2003: Rot-Weiß Oberhausen (Assistant)
- 2003–2004: Uzbekistan (Assistant)
- 2004: Uzbekistan
- 2005–2006: Shahid Ghandi
- 2006: Al-Ahli
- 2007–2008: Kuala Lumpur FA
- 2008–2009: Neftchi Baku
- 2009: Okktha United FC
- 2009–2010: Tahaddy
- 2011: Esteghlal (Assistant)
- 2011–2012: Zob Ahan (Assistant)
- 2013: Aluminium (Assistant)
- 2013–2014: Aluminium
- 2016–2019: Vietnam (Technical director)
- 2017–2019: Vietnam U16 (Technical director)
- 2016–2019: Vietnam U19 (Technical director)
- 2017–2020: Vietnam U23 (Technical director)
- 2020–2022: Viettel (Technical director)
- * Club domestic league appearances and goals

Hans-Jürgen Gede (born 14 November 1956) is a German football coach and former player.

== Playing career ==
Born in Gelsenkirchen, Gede began playing football for FC Schalke 04 in 1975. In 1977, he joined SC Preußen Münster and after playing 71 times for club, he left Preußen and joined SC Fortuna Köln. He made 344 appearances for Fortuna Köln and scored 48 goals. He retired in 1991.

== Coaching career ==
Gede was appointed as head coach of Fortuna Düsseldorf in 1991, just months after his retirement from playing. He signed with Iranian side Persepolis in 1994, beginning a successful tenure. After about three months in Persepolis, he was appointed as head coach of the Iran national under-23 football team in June 1994 to lead the team to qualification for the 1996 Summer Olympics, but failed. After that, he coached at KSV Hessen Kassel, SV Lippstadt 08 and Rot-Weiß Oberhausen. In 2004, he was appointed as assistant coach of the Uzbekistan national football team and became their head coach in 2005, coaching the team in two matches. In 2005, he returned to Iran and managed Shahid Ghandi in the Azadegan League. Al-Ahli Manama, Kuala Lumpur FA, Neftchi Baku, Okktha United FC and Tahaddy Benghazi were his next teams. During the 2010–11 Persian Gulf Cup, he was the assistant coach to Parviz Mazloomi in Esteghlal. On 1 June 2011, he was appointed as the assistant coach of Zob Ahan. On 20 June 2016, he was appointed as a technical director of the Vietnam national team. On 10 August 2020, he was appointed as the technical director of Viettel.
