= Valentine Atem =

Cameroonian footballer

Personal information
- Full name: Valentine Fondongbeze Atem
- Date of birth: August 26, 1978 (age 48)
- Place of birth: Kumba, Cameroon
- Height: 1.76 m (5 ft 9 1/2 in)
- Position: Forward

Team information
- Current team: Tiko United

Youth career
- –1996: Brasseries du Cameroun

Senior career*
Years	Team	Apps	(Gls)
1997–1998	Olympic Muyuka	34	(27)
1998–1999	Victoria Shooting Stars		
1999–2000	Kumbo Strikers		
2000–2003	Mount Cameroon FC	34	(6)
2003–2007	Ashanti Gold SC		
2007	Eintracht Braunschweig	13	(3)
2007–2008	SV Wehen	22	(3)
2008	MSV Duisburg	6	(0)
2009–2010	Neftchi Baku PFC	15	(1)
2010–	Tiko United		
- * Club domestic league appearances and goals as of April 4, 2007

Valentine Fondongbeze Atem (born August 26, 1978, in Kumba) is a professional Cameroonian footballer who played as a striker for Tiko United.

== Career ==
Atem played formerly for the German club SV Wehen-Wiesbaden since July 2007. Before he had signed a contract there, he played for Eintracht Braunschweig. In 2003, he represented his club Mount Cameroon FC in the African Champions League and was the captain of the team. He left MSV Duisburg after six months on 30 January 2009 and joined Azerbaijani club Neftchi Baku PFC, signing a contract until 30 June 2009.
