= Suat Usta =

Turkish footballer (born 1981)

Personal information
- Full name: Suat Usta
- Date of birth: 3 August 1981 (age 45)
- Place of birth: Maastricht, Netherlands
- Height: 1.96 m (6 ft 5 in)
- Position: Centre back

Team information
- Current team: VB Addu FC
- Number: 16

Youth career
- MVV
- Eindhoven
- Fortuna Sittard
- RKVVL
- SPCL

Senior career*
Years	Team	Apps	(Gls)
2000–2001	Eindhoven	21	(1)
2001–2002	MVV	10	(1)
2002–2006	Galatasaray	16	(1)
2004–2005	→ Konyaspor (loan)	8	(0)
2006	→ Antalyaspor (loan)		
2006–2007	Sakaryaspor	7	(0)
2007–2008	Çaykur Rizespor	22	(0)
2008–2010	Neftchi Baku	29	(6)
2010–2011	Diyarbakırspor	6	(0)
2012	Fortuna Sittard	15	(0)
2012–	VB Sports	1	(0)
- * Club domestic league appearances and goals as of 29 July 2012 (UTC)

Suat Usta (born 3 August 1981) is a former footballer. who played as a centre back. Born in the Netherlands, he represented Turkey at youth international levels.

== Career ==
Formerly, he played for FC Eindhoven, MVV Maastricht, Galatasaray, Antalyaspor, Sakaryaspor, Çaykur Rizespor and Fortuna Sittard.
