= Vladimir Mićović =

Serbian footballer and coach

Personal information
- Full name: Vladimir Mićović
- Date of birth: October 11, 1975 (age 51)
- Place of birth: Aranđelovac, SFR Yugoslavia
- Height: 1.92 m (6 ft 4 in)
- Position: Goalkeeper

Senior career*
Years	Team	Apps	(Gls)
1993–1994	Šumadija Aranđelovac	3	(0)
1994–1995	Red Star Belgrade	0	(0)
1995–1996	Šumadija Aranđelovac	27	(0)
1996–1997	Red Star Belgrade	0	(0)
1997–2000	Balkan Bukovica	88	(0)
2000–2001	Železničar Beograd	33	(0)
2001–2003	Budućnost Banatski Dvor	66	(0)
2003–2004	Tavriya Simferopol	4	(0)
2004–2005	Budućnost Banatski Dvor	25	(0)
2005–2010	Neftchi Baku	92	(0)
2011	Abşeron		(0)

International career
- FR Yugoslavia U21
- * Club domestic league appearances and goals

Vladimir Mićović (Serbian Cyrillic: Владимир Мићовић; born October 11, 1975) is a Serbian former football goalkeeper and current goalkeeping coach of Neftchi Baku.

In May 2014 Mićović rejoined his old club Neftchi Baku as a goalkeeping coach.

== External sources ==
- Profile and stats until 2003 at Dekisa.Tripod.
