= Walter Guglielmone =

Uruguayan footballer (born 1978)

Personal information
- Full name: Walter Fernando Guglielmone Gómez
- Date of birth: 11 April 1978 (age 48)
- Place of birth: Salto, Uruguay
- Height: 1.70 m (5 ft 7 in)
- Position: Striker

Youth career
- –1999: Nacional

Senior career*
Years	Team	Apps	(Gls)
2000	Frontera Rivera	33	(15)
2001	Montevideo Wanderers	34	(16)
2002	Nacional	2	(0)
2002–2003	Ajaccio	17	(1)
2003	Nacional	7	(1)
2004	Danubio	15	(7)
2004–2005	Pachuca	10	(3)
2005	Chiapas	17	(3)
2005–2006	Peñarol	24	(4)
2006–2007	Liverpool (Montevideo)	26	(9)
2007–2009	Inter Baku	45	(28)
2009–2010	Neftchi Baku	22	(2)
2010	Guaraní	13	(3)
2010–2011	Wanderers	14	(3)
2012	Pelotas	15	(6)
2012	Beijing BIT	13	(3)
Total		304	(104)

International career
2001	Uruguay	2	(0)
- * Club domestic league appearances and goals

Walter Fernando Guglielmone Gómez (Spanish pronunciation: [ˈwalteɾ ɣuɣljelˈmone]; (Note: In isolation, Guglielmone is pronounced [ɡuɣljelˈmone].) born 11 April 1978) is a Uruguayan former professional footballer who played as a forward. During his career, Guglielmone has played for clubs in Uruguay, France, Azerbaijan, Mexico, Paraguay and China. He made two appearances for the Uruguay national team in 2001.

== Club career ==
Guglielmone began his career in Uruguay, making his debut for Nacional de Montevideo in 1999. After a year with them, he moved to Frontera Rivera, followed the next year by another move to Montevideo Wanderers. Guglielmone left Uruguay to join AC Ajaccio in the French Ligue 1 for the 2002–03 season, appearing 17 times and scoring just once, in the game against Sedan on 24 August 2002. However, after just a year in France, he returned to Uruguay, where he played for Danubio during the first half of 2004. He joined Pachuca for the 2004 Apertura, finishing the season with three goals in 11 games played, 6 starts.

In 2007, Guglielmone joined Azerbaijan Premier League side Inter Baku, becoming the first Latin American to play for the club. Guglielmone spent two season with Inter and was the top goalscorer during the 2008–09 season. For his third season in Azerbaijan, Guglielmone moved to Baku rivals, Neftchi Baku. After leaving Neftchi Baku in the summer of 2010, he joined Club Guaraní of the Paraguayan Primera División in July 2010.

In July 2011, after one season back at Wanderers, Guglielmone was released. Five months late, on 21 December 2011, Guglielmone joined Brazilian side Pelotas. On 31 March 2012, Guglielmone received a red card for shoving teammate Douglas Silva twice in the face in a Campeonato Gaúcho match against Caxias. After leaving Pelotas, Guglielmone signed with Beijing BIT in the Chinese Jia League.

== International career ==
Guglielmone appeared twice for the Uruguay national team, with his debut coming on 19 July 2001 against Honduras in the 2001 Copa América. His second appearance came 9 days later in the Third-place match also against Honduras.

== Personal life ==
He is the older half-brother of Boca Juniors striker Edinson Cavani. and also family of Oscar Guglielmone

== Career statistics ==
=== Club ===
Appearances and goals by club, season and competition
Club	Season	League			National Cup		League Cup		Continental		Total	
Club	Season	Division	Apps	Goals	Apps	Goals	Apps	Goals	Apps	Goals	Apps	Goals
Nacional	1999	Uruguayan Primera División	3	1	—		—				3	1
Frontera Rivera	2000	Uruguayan Primera División	33	15	—		—		—		33	15
Montevideo Wanderers	2001	Uruguayan Primera División	34	16	—		—		—		34	16
Nacional	2002	Uruguayan Primera División	2	0	—		—				2	0
Ajaccio	2002–03	Ligue 1	17	1			1	0	—		18	1
Nacional	2003	Uruguayan Primera División	2	0	—		—		—		2	0
Danubio	2004	Uruguayan Primera División	15	7	—		—		—		15	7
Pachuca	2004	Liga MX	10	3			—		0	0	10	3
Chiapas	2005	Liga MX	17	3			—		—		17	3
Peñarol	2005–06	Uruguayan Primera División	24	4	—		—		—		24	4
Liverpool de Montevideo	2006–07	Uruguayan Primera División	26	9	—		—		—		26	9
Inter Baku	2007–08	Azerbaijan Premier League	20	11			—		—		20	11
Inter Baku	2008–09	Azerbaijan Premier League	24	17		3	—		2	0	26	20
Inter Baku	Total		44	28		3	—		2	0	46	31
Neftchi Baku	2009–10	Azerbaijan Premier League	22	2		2	—		—		22	4
Guaraní	2010	Paraguayan Primera División	13	3	—		—		3	0	16	3
Montevideo Wanderers	2010–11	Uruguayan Primera División	14	3	—		—		—		14	3
Pelotas	2012	Campeonato Gaúcho	15	6			—		—		15	6
Beijing BIT	2012	Chinese Jia League	13	3			—		—		13	3
Career total			304	104		5	1	0	5	0	310	109

=== International ===
Appearances and goals by national team and year
National team	Year	Apps	Goals
Uruguay	2001	2	0
Total		2	0

== Honours ==
=== Club ===
Nacional

- Uruguayan Primera División: 2002

Danubio

- Uruguayan Primera División: 2004

Inter Baku

- Azerbaijan Premier League: 2007–08

=== Individual ===
- Azerbaijan Premier League Top Scorer: 2008–09 (17 goals)
