= Adrian Neaga =

Romanian footballer and manager

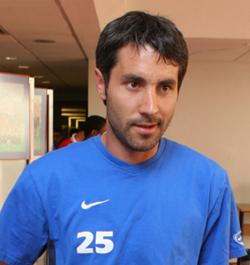

Personal information
- Full name: Adrian Constantin Neaga
- Date of birth: 4 June 1979 (age 47)
- Place of birth: Pitești, Romania
- Height: 1.78 m (5 ft 10 in)
- Position: Striker

Youth career
- –1997: Argeș Pitești

Senior career*
Years	Team	Apps	(Gls)
1997–2001	Argeș Pitești	52	(15)
1998–1999	→ Dacia Pitești (loan)	20	(10)
2001–2005	Steaua București	59	(27)
2003	→ Al-Nassr (loan)	1	(0)
2005–2006	Chunnam Dragons	47	(13)
2006–2007	Seongnam Ilhwa Chunma	26	(4)
2007–2009	Steaua București	33	(3)
2008–2009	Steaua II București	5	(4)
2009–2010	Neftchi Baku	43	(16)
2010	Unirea Urziceni	6	(0)
2010–2011	Volyn Lutsk	4	(0)
2011–2013	Mioveni	26	(0)
2014	Argeș Pitești 1953		
2016	National II Sebiș	1	(0)
Total		312	(92)

International career
2000–2004	Romania	6	(0)

Managerial career
- 2013: Unirea Bascov
- 2013–2014: Atletic Bradu
- 2014–2015: Urban Titu
- 2015: SCM Pitești
- 2015–2016: Național Sebiș
- 2016: Atletic Bradu
- 2018: Poli Timișoara
- * Club domestic league appearances and goals

Adrian Constantin Neaga (born 4 June 1979) is a Romanian football manager and retired player.

== Playing career ==
=== Early career ===
Neaga was born in Pitești.

He signed his first professional contract with Argeș Pitești in 1997. He was then playing in the same team with Adrian Mutu. He played three games in his first season, scoring a goal, and then played two other games in the first half of the following season, before the club decided to loan him to Dacia Pitești, a club from the second league, where he played 20 games and scored 10 goals, therefore gaining the right to be part of Argeș Pitești again.

In 2001 Neaga failed a drug test which had been performed at the end of a Divizia A game. He tested positive for the anabolic steroid metenolone. He was not sanctioned for it, however.

=== Return to Steaua ===
After Neaga ended his contract with Al-Nassr, Neaga returned to Steaua București. During the 2003–04 season he scored 13 goals in 15 games.

Walter Zenga was appointed head coach of Steaua București in the summer of 2004 and he soon made Neaga one of the two team leaders, alongside Mirel Rădoi, and in the first half of that season Neaga played 15 games in Divizia A, scoring six goals, while in the UEFA Cup he scored five times in eight games, finishing Steaua's top-scorer in Europe that season.

In February 2005, Gigi Becali received a buying offer from the South Korean club Chunnam Dragons for US$1.5 million. Becali accepted the offer, even though Neaga and the team were due to play a very important game against Valencia CF, then the La Liga champions and UEFA Cup winners, in the second round of the UEFA Cup.

=== South Korea ===
During his time at Chunnam Dragons, Neaga was selected in the Team of the Season and was awarded the Bronze Boot for finishing third in the goalscorers standings. After 18 months at Chunnam Dragons, Neaga made a statement saying that he would like to return to Steaua București. His club agreed to the transfer, on the condition that the Romanian club pay a US$1.5 million release fee. But Steaua București refused, and Neaga joined Korean club Seongnam Ilhwa Chunma instead. With his new team, Neaga won the Korean title for the first time and, also for the first time, played in the Asian Champions League, scoring a goal in his first game, against Vietnam's champions.

=== Second return to Steaua București ===
In June 2007, Neaga returned to Steaua București for a second time. Back at Steaua, he scored a goal in the 2–0 home victory against BATE Borisov, thus qualifying for the first time in his life for the UEFA Champions League, where he played against the likes of Arsenal and Sevilla.

In January 2009, Neaga was released by Steaua București and signed for Azerbaijani club Neftchi Baku.

== Coaching career ==
After Neaga ended his player career, Neaga started a career as coach, and his first job came at the beginning of 2013, when he signed a contract with Liga IV team Unirea Bascov. In December 2013, Neaga signed a contract to manage Atletic Bradu, in Liga III. In July 2014, Neaga signed a contract to coach ACS Urban Titu.

== Honours ==
Steaua București

- Liga I: 2004–05

Seongnam Ilhwa Chunma

- K-League: 2006
