= José Carlos (footballer, born 1988) =

Brazilian footballer

Personal information
- Full name: José Carlos dos Reis
- Date of birth: February 11, 1988 (age 38)
- Place of birth: Varginha, Brazil
- Height: 1.73 m (5 ft 8 in)
- Position: Midfielder

Team information
- Current team: Icasa
- Number: 21

Senior career*
Years	Team	Apps	(Gls)
- Guarani (Brazil)
2007–2008	Brasilis		
2008–2010	Neftchi Baku	27	(1)
2011	Mogi Mirim		
2012	Uberlândia		
2013–	Icasa		
- * Club domestic league appearances and goals

José Carlos dos Reis (born February 11, 1988, in Varginha) is a Brazilian football forward for Icasa.

He played in 2007 and in 2008 for Brasilis, moving in February 2008 to Neftchi Baku in the Azerbaijan Premier League.
