= Neftçi PFK in European football =

Overview of Neftçi PFK's role in European football

Neftçi PFK in European Football
- Club: Neftçi PFK
- Seasons played: 23
- Top scorer: Emin Mahmudov (9)
- First entry: 1995–96 UEFA Cup Winners' Cup
- Latest entry: 2023–24 UEFA Europa Conference League

Neftçi PFK] have participated in 23 editions of the club competitions governed by UEFA, the chief authority for football across Europe.

== History ==
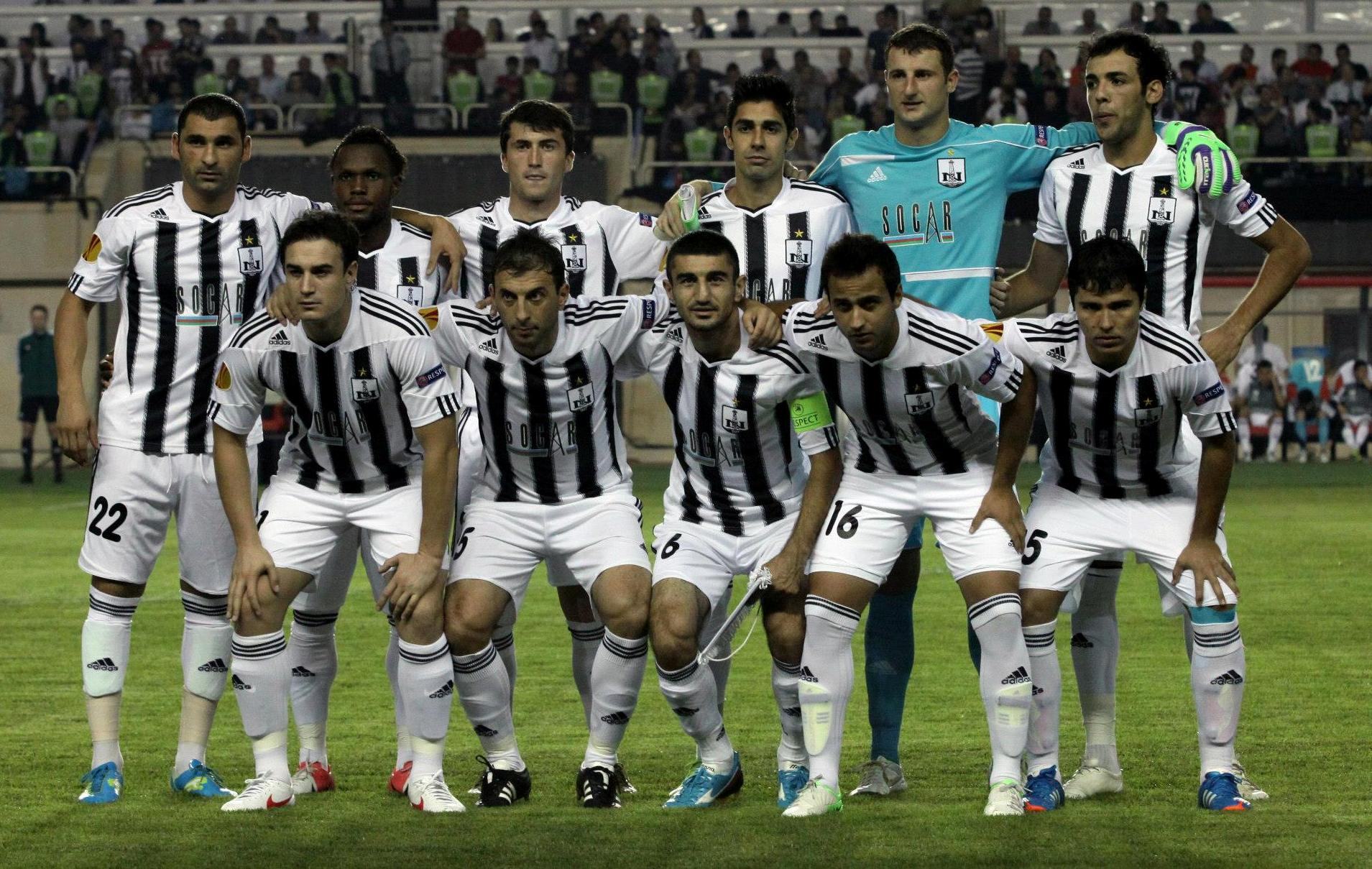
UEFA Europa League 2012-10-04, Neftçi-Inter Milan.

Neftçi PFK is an association football club from Baku, Azerbaijan. The team has participated in 12 seasons of Union of European Football Associations (UEFA) club competitions, including 5 seasons in the European Cup and Champions League, 5 seasons in the UEFA Cup, one season in the Cup Winners' Cup, one season in the Intertoto Cup and one season in the Europa League. It has played 42 UEFA games, resulting in 12 wins, 11 draws and 19 defeats.

In European competitions, the club also have advanced to the second qualifying round of the UEFA Champions League twice, having defeated Bosnian champions – NK Široki Brijeg – and Icelandic champions – FH Hafnarfjarðar – in 2004 and 2005 respectively. In 2008, the club advanced to the third round of the 2008 Intertoto Cup, after defeating the Slovak club FC Nitra and the Belgian side K.F.C. Germinal Beerschot in the first two rounds.

Neftçi's biggest win in Europe is a 3–0 victory over FC Zestaponi in the 2012–13 UEFA Champions League.

The club has an excellent European cup record, having not lost at home since the 1999–2000 season.

Neftçi's home games are usually played at the Tofiq Bahramov Stadium in Baku. The stadium was built by German prisoners of war in 1951 and constructed in the shape of the letter C to honour Stalin (Cyrillic: Cтaлин), however it was renamed after famous football referee Tofiq Bahramov in 1993 after his death. The stadium also serves as the home ground of the Azerbaijan national football team and holds 30,000 spectators making it the largest stadium in the country. In 2011, Neftçi's domestic games moved to the Ismat Gayibov Stadium. In 2012, Neftçi's domestic games moved to Eighth Kilometer District Stadium – also known as the Bakcell Arena for sponsorship purposes is a stadium in Nizami raion, Baku, Azerbaijan.

=== In 2012-13, Group stage ===

Match line-up for Europa League 2nd leg against APOEL. 30 August 2012.

In 2012, Neftçi became the first Azerbaijani team to advance to the group stage of a European competition. Neftçi managed to get three points in six matches, drawing with FK Partizan both times and holding Inter Milan at Stadio Giuseppe Meazza.

==== Group H ====
Pos	Team	Pld	W	D	L	GF	GA	GD	Pts	Qualification	RUB	INT	PAR	NEF
1	(Russia) Rubin Kazan	6	4	2	0	10	3	+7	14	Advance to knockout phase	—	3–0	2–0	1–0
2	(Italy) Internazionale	6	3	2	1	11	9	+2	11	Advance to knockout phase	2–2	—	1–0	2–2
3	(Serbia) Partizan	6	0	3	3	3	8	−5	3 (Note: Tied on head-to-head points (2) and head-to-head goal difference (0). Head-to-head away goals: Partizan 1, Neftçi 0.)		1–1	1–3	—	0–0
4	(Azerbaijan) Neftçi	6	0	3	3	4	8	−4	3		0–1	1–3	1–1	—

Source: Soccerway
Notes:

Note: Partizan are ranked ahead of Neftçi on head-to-head away goals (PAR: 1; NEF: 0).

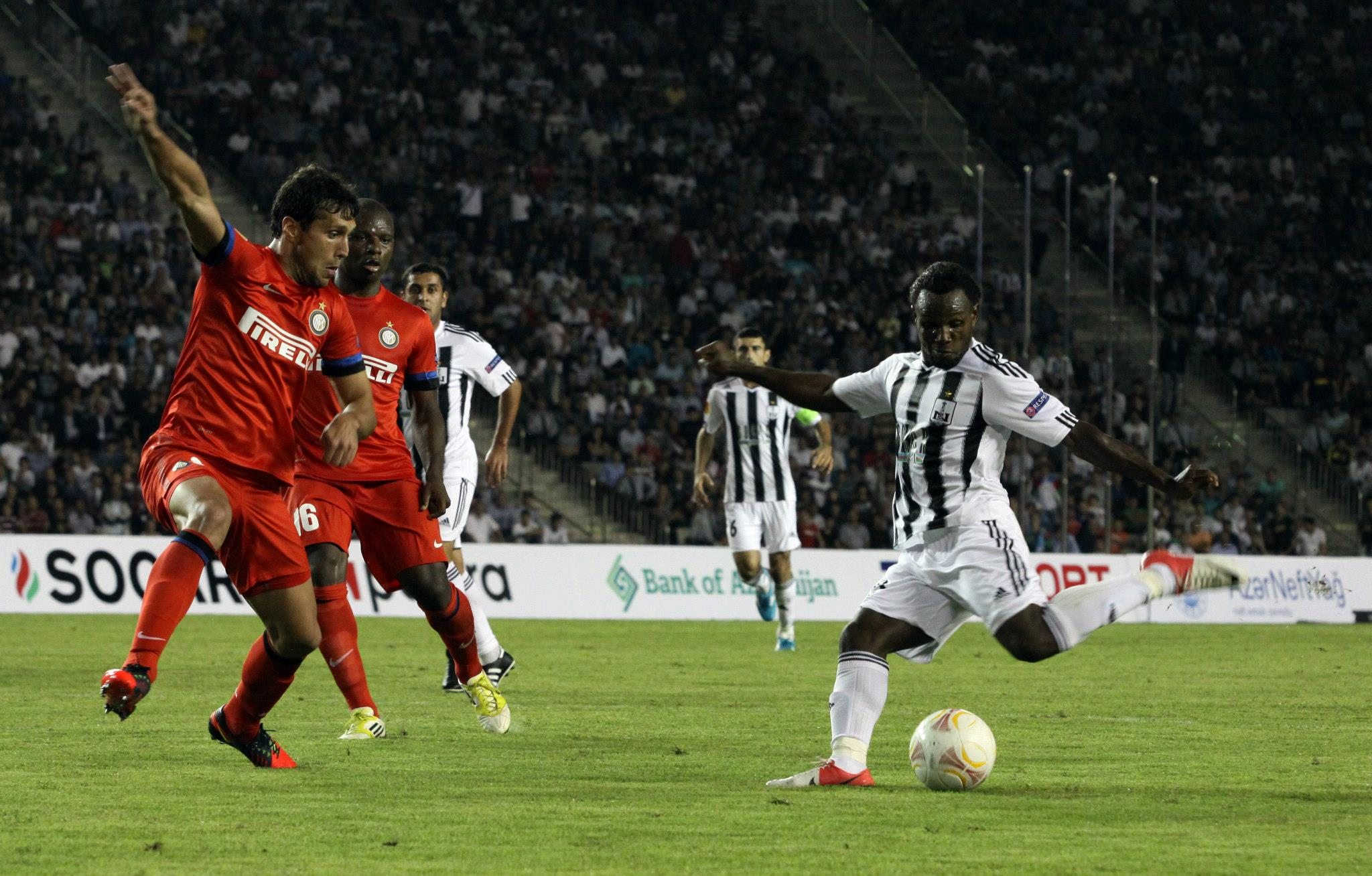
Neftçi v Internazionale

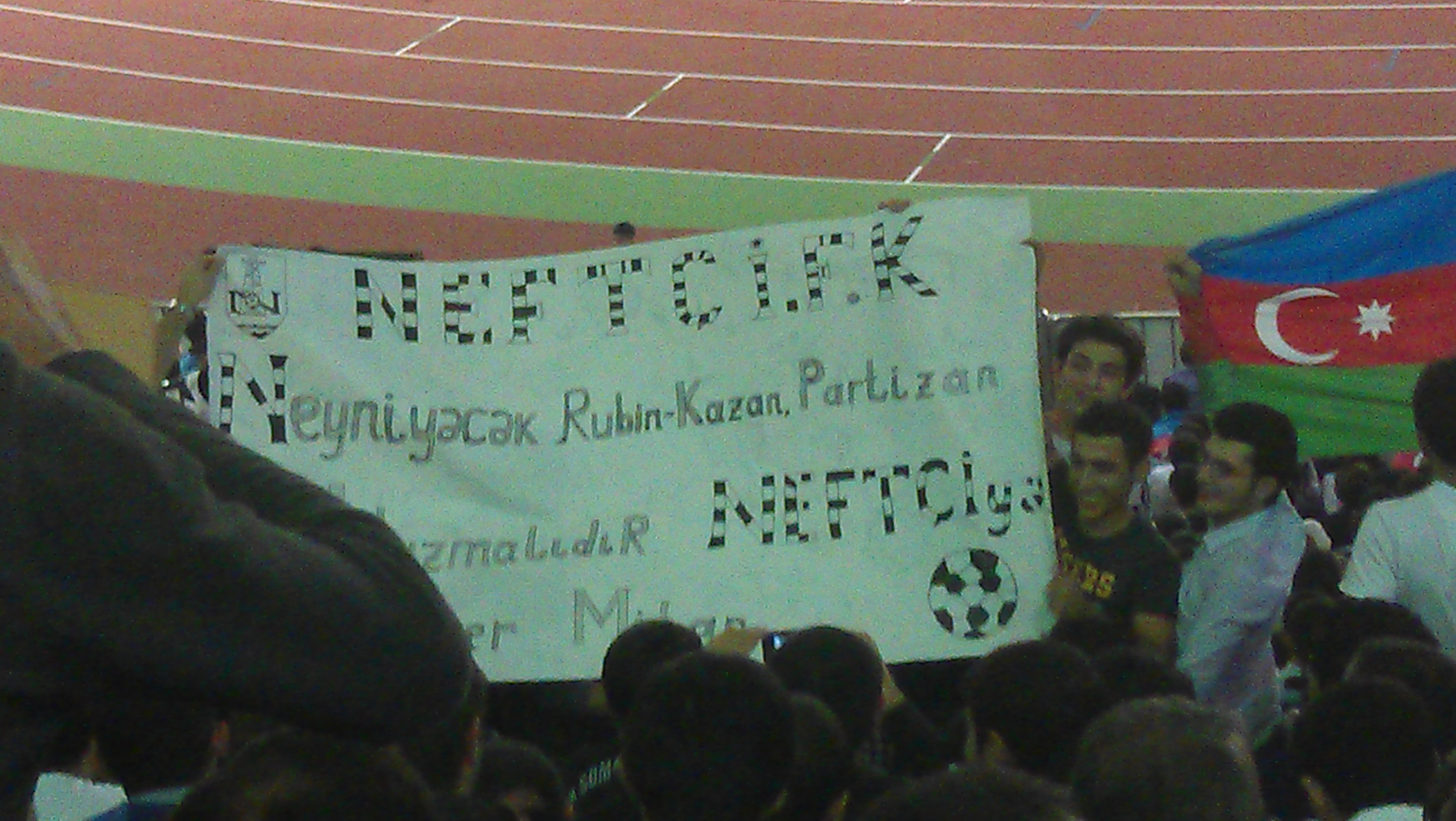
Neftçi fans placad

=== Matches ===
As of match played 30 July 2026

Games of Neftçi in UEFA competitions
Season	Competition	Round	Club	Home	Away	Aggregate
1995–96	Cup Winners' Cup	1Q	(Cyprus) APOEL	0–0	0–3	0–3
1996–97	UEFA Cup	1Q	(Bulgaria) Lokomotiv Sofia	2–1	0–6	2–7
1997–98	Champions League	1Q	(Poland) Widzew Łódź	0–2	0–8	0–10
1999–00	UEFA Cup	1Q	(Federal Republic of Yugoslavia) Red Star Belgrade	2–3	0–1	2–4
2000–01	UEFA Cup	1Q	(Slovenia) Hit Gorica	1–0	1–3	2–3
2001–02	UEFA Cup	1Q	(Slovenia) Hit Gorica	0–0	0–1	0–1
2004–05	Champions League	1Q	(Bosnia and Herzegovina) Široki Brijeg	1–0	1–2	2–2 (a)
2004–05	Champions League	2Q	(Russia) CSKA Moscow	0–0	0–2	0–2
2005–06	Champions League	1Q	(Iceland) FH Hafnarfjarðar	2–0	2–1	4–1
2005–06	Champions League	2Q	(Belgium) Anderlecht	1–0	0–5	1–5
2007–08	UEFA Cup	1Q	(Austria) SV Ried	2–1	1–3	3–4
2008	Intertoto Cup	1R	(Slovakia) Nitra	2–0	1–3	3–3 (a)
2008	Intertoto Cup	2R	(Belgium) Germinal Beerschot	1–0	1–1	2–1
2008	Intertoto Cup	3R	(Romania) Vaslui	2–1	0–2	2–3
2011–12	Champions League	2Q	(Croatia) Dinamo Zagreb	0–0	0–3	0–3
2012–13	Champions League	2Q	(Georgia (country)) Zestaponi	3–0	2–2	5–2
2012–13	Champions League	3Q	(Israel) Ironi Kiryat Shmona	2–2	0–4	2–6
2012–13	Europa League	Play-off	(Cyprus) APOEL	1–1	3–1	4–2
2012–13	Europa League	Group H	(Serbia) Partizan	1–1	0–0	4th place
2012–13	Europa League	Group H	(Italy) Internazionale	1–3	2–2	4th place
2012–13	Europa League	Group H	(Russia) Rubin Kazan	0–1	0–1	4th place
2013–14	Champions League	2Q	(Albania) Skënderbeu	0–0	0–1	0–1 (a.e.t.)
2014–15	Europa League	2Q	(Slovenia) Koper	1–2	2–0	3–2
2014–15	Europa League	3Q	(Georgia (country)) Chikhura Sachkhere	0–0	3–2	3–2
2014–15	Europa League	Play-off	(Serbia) Partizan	1–2	2–3	3–5
2015–16	Europa League	1Q	(Montenegro) Mladost Podgorica	2–2	1–1	3–3 (a)
2016–17	Europa League	1Q	(Malta) Balzan	1–2	2–0	3–2
2016–17	Europa League	2Q	(North Macedonia) Shkëndija	0–0	0–1	0–1
2018–19	Europa League	1Q	(Hungary) Újpest	3–1	0–4	3–5
2019–20	Europa League	1Q	(Moldova) Speranța	6–0	3–0	9–0
2019–20	Europa League	2Q	(Russia) Arsenal Tula	3–0	1–0	4–0
2019–20	Europa League	3Q	(Israel) Bnei Yehuda	2–2	1–2	3–4
2020–21	Europa League	1Q	(North Macedonia) Shkupi	2–1	—N/a	—N/a
2020–21	Europa League	2Q	(Turkey) Galatasaray	1–3	—N/a	—N/a
2021–22	Champions League	1Q	(Georgia (country)) Dinamo Tbilisi	2–1	2–1	4–2
2021–22	Champions League	2Q	(Greece) Olympiacos	0–1	0–1	0–2
2021–22	Europa League	3Q	(Finland) HJK	2–2	0–3	2–5
2021–22	Europa Conference League	Play-off	(Israel) Maccabi Haifa	3–3	0–4	3–7
2022–23	Europa Conference League	2Q	(Cyprus) Aris Limassol	3–0	0–2	3–2
2022–23	Europa Conference League	3Q	(Austria) Rapid Wien	2–1	0–2	2–3 (a.e.t.)
2023–24	Europa Conference League	2Q	(Bosnia and Herzegovina) Željezničar	2–0	2–2	4–2
2023–24	Europa Conference League	3Q	(Turkey) Beşiktaş	1–3	1–2	2–5
2026–27	UEFA Conference League	2Q	(Belarus) Dinamo Minsk	2–4	1–0	3–4

Notes

- 1Q: First qualifying round
- 2Q: Second qualifying round
- 3Q: Third qualifying round
- PO: Play-off round
- Group: Group stage

== Player statistics ==
=== Appearances ===
As of match played 30 July 2026

	Name	Years	UEFA Cup Winners' Cup	UEFA Cup	UEFA Intertoto Cup	UEFA Champions League	UEFA Europa League	UEFA Conference League	Total	Ratio
1	(Azerbaijan) Emin Mahmudov	2017-Present	(-)	(-)	(-)	4 (1)	13 (5)	12 (3)	29 (10)	0.34
2	(Azerbaijan) Rashad Sadiqov	2003-2008, 2012-2014; 2017-2018	(-)	2 (0)	5 (2)	11 (1)	8 (1)	(-)	26 (4)	0.15
3	(Azerbaijan) Araz Abdullayev	2008-2011, 2012-2016	(-)	(-)	(-)	6 (0)	19 (3)	(-)	25 (3)	0.12
4	(Brazil) Flavinho	2010-2015	(-)	(-)	(-)	8 (0)	14 (2)	(-)	22 (2)	0.09
5	(Azerbaijan) Javid Imamverdiyev	2008-2017	(-)	(-)	(-)	8 (2)	12 (1)	(-)	20 (3)	0.15
5	(Sierra Leone) Julius Wobay	2012-2015	(-)	(-)	(-)	6 (3)	14 (2)	(-)	20 (5)	0.25
5	(Brazil) Bruno Bertucci	2012-2014	(-)	(-)	(-)	6 (0)	14 (0)	(-)	20 (0)	0
5	(Azerbaijan) Rahman Hajiyev	2015-2025	(-)	(-)	(-)	(-)	12 (2)	8 (1)	20 (3)	0.15
9	(Serbia) Saša Stamenković	2011-2015	(-)	(-)	(-)	5 (0)	14 (0)	(-)	19 (0)	0
9	(Paraguay) Éric Ramos	2011-2015	(-)	(-)	(-)	6 (0)	13 (0)	(-)	19 (0)	0
11	(Azerbaijan) Rashad Sadygov	2001-2002, 2003-2005; 2006-2008	(-)	4 (1)	6 (1)	8 (0)	(-)	(-)	18 (2)	0.11
11	(Serbia) Vojislav Stanković	2019-2023	(-)	(-)	(-)	4 (0)	8 (0)	6 (0)	18 (0)	0
13	(Azerbaijan) Mirhüseyn Seyidov	2009-2015	(-)	(-)	(-)	4 (0)	13 (1)	(-)	17 (1)	0.06
13	(Azerbaijan) Omar Buludov	2016-2024	(-)	(-)	(-)	1 (0)	11 (0)	5 (0)	17 (0)	0
13	(Senegal) Mamadou Mbodj	2019-2022	(-)	(-)	(-)	4 (0)	8 (2)	5 (0)	17 (2)	0.12
16	(Azerbaijan) Elvin Yunuszade	2010-2015	(-)	(-)	(-)	5 (0)	11 (0)	(-)	16 (0)	0
16	(Nigeria) Yusuf Lawal	2020-2022	(-)	(-)	(-)	4 (0)	6 (0)	6 (0)	16 (0)	0
18	(Azerbaijan) Zaur Tagizade	2004-2010	(-)	4 (0)	4 (0)	7 (1)	(-)	(-)	15 (1)	0.07
19	(Chile) Nicolás Canales	2012-2013, 2014-2015; 2016	(-)	(-)	(-)	4 (1)	10 (2)	(-)	14 (3)	0.21
19	(North Macedonia) Igor Mitreski	2010-2014	(-)	(-)	(-)	6 (0)	8 (0)	6 (0)	14 (0)	0
21	(Guinea) Mamadou Kané	2019-2021	(-)	(-)	(-)	0 (0)	11 (0)	2 (0)	13 (0)	0
22	(Azerbaijan) İqor Getman	1991, 1997-2007	(-)	6 (0)	(-)	6 (0)	(-)	(-)	12 (0)	0
22	(Azerbaijan) Rail Malikov	2007-2012	(-)	2 (0)	5 (0)	5 (0)	(-)	(-)	12 (0)	0
22	(Azerbaijan) Agil Mammadov	2015-2016, 2017; 2019-2024	(-)	(-)	(-)	4 (0)	6 (0)	2 (0)	12 (0)	0
25	(Azerbaijan) Bakhtiyar Musayev	1991-1995, 1998-2003; 2005-2006	2 (0)	6 (1)	(-)	3 (0)	(-)	(-)	11 (1)	0.09
25	(Georgia (country)) Georgi Adamia	2004-2008	(-)	2 (0)	6 (1)	3 (0)	(-)	(-)	11 (1)	0.09
25	(Azerbaijan) Ilham Yadullayev	1995-2001, 2004-2005	(-)	6 (0)	(-)	5 (0)	(-)	(-)	11 (0)	0
28	(Serbia) Vladimir Mićović	2005-2010	(-)	2 (0)	6 (0)	2 (0)	(-)	(-)	10 (0)	0
28	(Azerbaijan) Ruslan Abishov	2006-2012, 2017-2019	(-)	(-)	6 (0)	2 (0)	2 (0)	(-)	10 (0)	0
28	(Azerbaijan) Mirabdulla Abbasov	2015-2022	(-)	(-)	(-)	(-)	8 (0)	2 (0)	10 (0)	0
28	(Azerbaijan) Anton Kryvotsyuk	2017-2021	(-)	(-)	(-)	(-)	10 (1)	(-)	10 (1)	0.1
28	(Azerbaijan) Namiq Ələsgərov	2017-2021	(-)	(-)	(-)	7 (1)	3 (2)	(-)	10 (3)	0.3
28	(Azerbaijan) İsmayıl Zülfüqarlı	2019-2025	(-)	(-)	(-)	3 (0)	3 (1)	4 (0)	10 (1)	0.1
28	(Morocco) Sabir Bougrine	2020-2022	(-)	(-)	(-)	4 (0)	4 (2)	2 (0)	10 (2)	0.2
28	(Azerbaijan) Ruslan Abbasov	2001-2003, 2004-2007; 2008-2009	(-)	(-)	2 (0)	8 (0)	(-)	(-)	10 (0)	0
36	(Azerbaijan) Gurban Gurbanov	1996-1998, 2001; 2004-2005	(-)	4 (0)	(-)	5 (0)	(-)	(-)	9 (0)	0
36	(Azerbaijan) Jahangir Hasanzade	1998-2002, 2004-2005	(-)	6 (0)	(-)	3 (0)	(-)	(-)	9 (0)	0
36	(Azerbaijan) Mahir Shukurov	2006-2007, 2012-2014; 2016-2017	(-)	(-)	(-)	2 (0)	7 (1)	(-)	9 (1)	0.11
36	(Paraguay) César Meza Colli	2021-2023	(-)	6 (0)	(-)	3 (0)	4 (0)	2 (0)	9 (0)	0
36	(Azerbaijan) Eddy Israfilov	2022-2024	(-)	(-)	(-)	3 (0)	0 (0)	6 (2)	9 (2)	0.22
36	(Azerbaijan) Ruslan Gurbanov	2010-2016	(-)	(-)	(-)	(-)	9 (1)	(-)	9 (1)	0.11
42	(Azerbaijan) Yashar Vahabzade	1983-1989, 1993-1997	(-)	1 (2)	(-)	0 (6)	(-)	(-)	1 (8)	0.13
42	(Azerbaijan) Arif Asadov	1988-1993, 1995-1997; 2000-2002	1 (0)	6 (0)	(-)	1 (0)	(-)	(-)	8 (0)	0
42	(Azerbaijan) Vidadi Rzayev	1986-1991, 1991; 1995-1996, 1996-1998; 2003-2005	(-)	2 (1)	(-)	6 (0)	(-)	(-)	8 (1)	0.13
42	(Azerbaijan) Adehim Niftaliyev	1996, 1999-2002	(-)	6 (0)	(-)	2 (0)	(-)	(-)	8 (0)	0
42	(Azerbaijan) Elnur Allahverdiyev	2006-2009, 2014-2015	(-)	2 (0)	6 (1)	(-)	(-)	(-)	8 (1)	0.13
42	(Turkmenistan) Nazar Baýramow	2007-2010	(-)	2 (0)	6 (0)	(0)	(-)	(-)	8 (0)	0
42	(Azerbaijan) Samir Masimov	2014-2015	(-)	(-)	(-)	(-)	8 (0)	(-)	8 (0)	0
42	(Azerbaijan) Səlahət Ağayev	2017-2021	(-)	(-)	(-)	(-)	8 (0)	(-)	8 (0)	0
42	(Ukraine) Kyrylo Petrov	2017-2019	(-)	(-)	(-)	(-)	8 (0)	(-)	8 (0)	0
42	(Brazil) Dário Júnior	2018, 2019-2020	(-)	(-)	(-)	(-)	8 (3)	(-)	8 (3)	0.38
42	(Croatia) Ivan Brkić	2022-2024	(-)	(-)	(-)	(-)	(-)	8 (0)	8 (0)	0
42	(Azerbaijan) Azər Salahlı	2022-2025	(-)	(-)	(-)	(-)	(-)	8 (0)	8 (0)	0
42	(Azerbaijan) Farid Yusifli	2020-2024	(-)	(-)	(-)	2 (0)	0 (0)	6 (0)	8 (0)	0
42	(Azerbaijan) Khayal Najafov	2021-2024	(-)	(-)	(-)	2 (0)	4 (0)	2 (0)	8 (0)	0
42	(United States) Kenny Saief	2022-2023	(-)	(-)	(-)	(-)	(-)	8 (3)	8 (3)	0.38
42	(Palestine) Ataa Jaber	2022-2024	(-)	(-)	(-)	(-)	(-)	8 (1)	8 (1)	0.13
58	(Azerbaijan) Kamal Guliyev	1997-2002	(-)	6 (0)	(-)	1 (0)	(-)	(-)	7 (0)	0
58	(Azerbaijan) Samir Aliyev	1999-2000, 2001-2002; 2006-2010	(-)	6 (1)	1 (0)	(-)	(-)	(-)	7 (1)	0.14
58	(Azerbaijan) Nadir Nabiyev	2001-2004, 2005-2008	(-)	3 (0)	(-)	4 (1)	(-)	(-)	7 (1)	0.14
58	(Azerbaijan) Aleksandr Chertoganov	2005-2009	(-)	(-)	5 (-)	2 (0)	(-)	(-)	7 (0)	0
58	(Brazil) Cauê	2014-2015	(-)	(-)	(-)	(-)	7 (0)	(-)	7 (0)	0
58	(Azerbaijan) Fahmin Muradbayli	2013-2022	(-)	(-)	(-)	(-)	5 (0)	2 (0)	7 (0)	0
58	(Haiti) Soni Mustivar	2018-2020	(-)	(-)	(-)	(-)	7 (0)	(-)	7 (0)	0
58	(France) Steeven Joseph-Monrose	2019-2021	(-)	(-)	(-)	(-)	7 (3)	(-)	7 (3)	0.43
58	(Azerbaijan) Mert Çelik	2020-2023	(-)	(-)	(-)	2 (0)	3 (0)	2 (0)	7 (0)	0
58	(Azerbaijan) Azer Aliyev	2022-2025	(-)	(-)	(-)	3 (0)	0 (0)	4 (0)	7 (0)	0
58	(Brazil) Guilherme Pato	2022-2023	(-)	(-)	(-)	4 (0)	0 (0)	3 (0)	7 (0)	0
69	(Azerbaijan) Elkhan Hasanov	1986-1991, 1993-1997; 2000-2001, 2003-2004	2 (0)	2 (0)	(-)	2 (0)	(-)	(-)	6 (0)	0
69	(Azerbaijan) Zaur Ismaylov	1997-2004	(-)	5 (0)	(-)	1 (0)	(-)	(-)	6 (0)	0
69	(Moldova) Vadim Boreț	2005-2008	(-)	2 (0)	(-)	4 (1)	(-)	(-)	6 (1)	0.17
69	(Ukraine) Oleh Herasymyuk	2008	(-)	(-)	6 (1)	(-)	(-)	(-)	6 (1)	0.17
69	(Brazil) Denis Silva	2010-2012, 2013-2015	(-)	(-)	(-)	4 (0)	2 (2)	(-)	6 (2)	0.33
69	(Azerbaijan) Tarlan Guliyev	2009-2014	(-)	(-)	(-)	(-)	6 (0)	(-)	6 (0)	0
69	(Azerbaijan) Emin Mehdiyev	2011-2015	(-)	(-)	(-)	2 (0)	4 (0)	(-)	6 (0)	0
69	(Brazil) Cardoso	2013-2015	(-)	(-)	(-)	1 (0)	5 (1)	(-)	6 (1)	0.17
69	(Cameroon) Ernest Webnje Nfor	2013-2015	(-)	(-)	(-)	(-)	6 (3)	(-)	6 (3)	0.5
69	(Azerbaijan) Magsad Isayev	2013-2017	(-)	(-)	(-)	(-)	6 (0)	(-)	6 (0)	0
69	(Azerbaijan) Rauf Aliyev	2015, 2019	(-)	(-)	(-)	(-)	6 (0)	(-)	6 (1)	0.17
69	(São Tomé and Príncipe) Harramiz	2021-2022	(-)	(-)	(-)	(-)	4 (0)	2 (0)	6 (0)	0
81	(Azerbaijan) Yunis Huseynov	1984-1998	2 (0)	1 (0)	(-)	2 (0)	(-)	(-)	5 (0)	0
81	(Azerbaijan) Elshan Gambarov	1999, 2003-2004	(-)	2 (0)	(-)	3 (0)	(-)	(-)	5 (0)	0
81	(Ukraine) Volodymyr Olefir	2008-2009	(-)	(-)	5 (0)	(-)	(-)	(-)	5 (0)	0
81	(Estonia) Dmitri Kruglov	2008, 2008-2010	(-)	(-)	5 (0)	(-)	(-)	(-)	5 (0)	0
81	(Azerbaijan) Elshan Abdullayev	2012-2016	(-)	(-)	(-)	(-)	5 (0)	(-)	5 (0)	0
81	(Greece) Vangelis Platellas	2019-2020	(-)	(-)	(-)	(-)	2 (5)	(-)	2 (5)	0.4
87	(Azerbaijan) Mehman Yunusov	1990, 1994-1996; 1997-1999	2 (0)	1 (0)	(-)	1 (0)	(-)	(-)	4 (0)	0
87	(Azerbaijan) Vugar Ismaylov	1997-1998	2 (0)	(-)	(-)	2 (0)	(-)	(-)	4 (0)	0
87	(Azerbaijan) Samir Alakbarov	1987-1994, 1995-1998	2 (0)	2 (0)	(-)	(-)	(-)	(-)	4 (0)	0
87	(Azerbaijan) Tarlan Ahmadov	1989-1991, 1997-2000; 2000-2001	(-)	4 (0)	(-)	(-)	(-)	(-)	4 (0)	0
87	(Azerbaijan) Vadim Vasilyev	1999-2002, 2003-2004	(-)	4 (2)	(-)	(-)	(-)	(-)	4 (2)	0.5
87	(Azerbaijan) Elchin Rahmanov	1998-1999, 2004-2008	(-)	1 (0)	(-)	3 (0)	(-)	(-)	4 (0)	0
87	(Azerbaijan) Farrukh Ismayilov	1999-2002, 2006-2007	(-)	4 (0)	(-)	(-)	(-)	(-)	4 (0)	0
87	(Azerbaijan) Branimir Subašić	2005-2008	(-)	2 (1)	(-)	2 (0)	(-)	(-)	4 (1)	0.25
87	(Bulgaria) Marcho Dafchev	2008-2009	(-)	(-)	4 (0)	(0)	(-)	(-)	4 (0)	0
87	(Azerbaijan) Huseyn Mahammadov	2003-2005, 2007-2008	(-)	(-)	(-)	4 (0)	(-)	(-)	4 (0)	0
87	(Azerbaijan) Emin Quliyev	2002, 2004-2005	(-)	(-)	(-)	4 (1)	(-)	(-)	4 (1)	0.25
87	(Azerbaijan) Mahmud Qurbanov	2004-2005	(-)	(-)	(-)	4 (0)	(-)	(-)	4 (0)	0
87	(Georgia (country)) Valeri Abramidze	2005-2006, 2009-2010	(-)	(-)	(-)	4 (0)	(-)	(-)	4 (0)	0
87	(Azerbaijan) Agil Mammadov	2003-2004, 2005-2007; 2007-2008	(-)	(-)	(-)	4 (2)	(-)	(-)	4 (2)	0.5
87	(Slovenia) Tomislav Mišura	2005-2006	(-)	(-)	(-)	4 (2)	(-)	(-)	4 (2)	0.5
87	(Brazil) Jairo Rodrigues	2015-2017	(-)	(-)	(-)	(-)	4 (1)	(-)	4 (1)	0.25
87	(Azerbaijan) Murad Agayev	2016-2017	(-)	(-)	(-)	(-)	4 (0)	(-)	4 (0)	0
87	(Venezuela) Edson Castillo	2016-2017	(-)	(-)	(-)	(-)	4 (0)	(-)	4 (0)	0
87	(Croatia) Krševan Santini	2016	(-)	(-)	(-)	(-)	4 (0)	(-)	4 (0)	0
87	(North Macedonia) Vanče Šikov	2016	(-)	(-)	(-)	(-)	4 (0)	(-)	4 (0)	0
87	(Croatia) Dario Melnjak	2016	(-)	(-)	(-)	(-)	4 (0)	(-)	4 (0)	0
87	(France) Bagaliy Dabo	2018-2020	(-)	(-)	(-)	(-)	4 (2)	(-)	4 (2)	0.5
87	(Brazil) Tiago Bezerra	2021-2022	(-)	(-)	(-)	4 (0)	(-)	(-)	4 (0)	0
87	(France) Romain Basque	2021	(-)	(-)	(-)	0 (0)	2 (0)	2 (0)	4 (0)	0
87	(Georgia (country)) Solomon Kvirkvelia	2022-2023	(-)	(-)	(-)	(-)	(-)	4 (0)	4 (0)	0
87	(Ghana) Godsway Donyoh	2022-2023	(-)	(-)	(-)	(-)	(-)	4 (1)	4 (1)	0.25
87	(Belarus) Yegor Bogomolsky	2022-2025	(-)	(-)	(-)	(-)	(-)	4 (0)	4 (0)	0
87	(Hungary) Márk Tamás	2023-2025	(-)	(-)	(-)	(-)	(-)	4 (0)	4 (0)	0
87	(Azerbaijan) Filip Ozobić	2023-2025	(-)	(-)	(-)	(-)	(-)	4 (0)	4 (0)	0
87	(Collectivity of Saint Martin) Keelan Lebon	2023-2025	(-)	(-)	(-)	(-)	(-)	4 (1)	4 (1)	0.25
87	(Brazil) Yuri Matias	2023-2025	(-)	(-)	(-)	(-)	(-)	4 (0)	4 (0)	0
118	(Azerbaijan) Eltay Aslanov	2004-2005	(-)	(-)	(-)	3 (0)	(-)	(-)	3 (0)	0
118	(Georgia (country)) Giorgi Chelidze	2008-2009	(-)	(-)	3 (0)	(-)	(-)	(-)	3 (0)	0
118	(Croatia) Darko Čordaš	2005-2006	(-)	(-)	(-)	3 (0)	(-)	(-)	3 (0)	0
118	(Uzbekistan) Bahodir Nasimov	2010-2011, 2011-2014	(-)	(-)	(-)	3 (0)	(-)	(-)	3 (0)	0
118	(Azerbaijan) Rauf Mehdiyev	1994-1996, 2010-2012	(-)	(-)	(-)	3 (0)	(-)	(-)	3 (0)	0
118	(Azerbaijan) Elvin Badalov	2014-2017, 2025-Present	(-)	(-)	(-)	(-)	3 (0)	0 (0)	3 (0)	0
118	(Azerbaijan) Rahil Mammadov	2015-2017	(-)	(-)	(-)	(-)	3 (0)	(-)	3 (0)	0
118	(Ivory Coast) Erwin Koffi	2023-2025	(-)	(-)	(-)	(-)	(-)	3 (0)	3 (0)	0
126	(Azerbaijan) Nazim Aliyev	1994-1995	2 (0)	(-)	(-)	(-)	(0)	(-)	2 (0)	0
126	(Azerbaijan) Mais Azimov	1995-1996	2 (0)	(-)	(-)	(-)	(0)	(-)	2 (0)	0
126	(Azerbaijan) Vyacheslav Lychkin	1991, 1995-1996	2 (0)	(-)	(-)	(-)	(0)	(-)	2 (0)	0
126	(Azerbaijan) Mirbağır İsayev	1993-1995	2 (0)	(-)	(-)	(-)	(0)	(-)	2 (0)	0
126	(Azerbaijan) Kamil Bayramov	1993-1996	2 (0)	(-)	(-)	(-)	(0)	(-)	2 (0)	0
126	(Azerbaijan) Ceyhun Tanriverdiyev	1996-1997	(-)	2 (0)	(-)	(-)	(0)	(-)	2 (0)	0
126	(Azerbaijan) Rasim Abushev	1986-1990, 1991-1993; 1996	(-)	2 (0)	(-)	(-)	(0)	(-)	2 (0)	0
126	(Azerbaijan) Rovshan Akhmedov	1996	(-)	2 (0)	(-)	(-)	(0)	(-)	2 (0)	0
126	(Azerbaijan) Ilham Mammadov	1991, 1996-1997; 1998-1999	(-)	2 (0)	(-)	(-)	(0)	(-)	2 (0)	0
126	(Azerbaijan) Musa Gurbanov	1989-1990, 1996-1997; 1997-1998	(-)	1 (0)	(-)	1 (0)	(0)	(-)	2 (0)	0
126	(Azerbaijan) Faig Jabbarov	1991-1992, 1996-1997	(-)	2 (0)	(-)	(-)	(0)	(-)	2 (0)	0
126	(Azerbaijan) Alexey Stukas	1998-2000	(-)	2 (0)	(-)	(-)	(0)	(-)	2 (0)	0
126	(Azerbaijan) Ramiz Mammadov	Ramiz Mammadov	(-)	2 (0)	(-)	(-)	(0)	(-)	2 (0)	0
126	(Azerbaijan) Mushfig Huseynov	2000-2001	(-)	2 (1)	(-)	(-)	(-)	(-)	2 (1)	0.5
126	(Azerbaijan) Vadar Nuriyev	2000-2001	(-)	2 (0)	(-)	(-)	(0)	(-)	2 (0)	0
126	(Georgia (country)) Giorgi Kilasonia	2001-2002	(-)	2 (0)	(-)	(-)	(0)	(-)	2 (0)	0
126	(Azerbaijan) Ramin Guliyev	2004, 2007-2008	(-)	2 (0)	(-)	(-)	(0)	(-)	2 (0)	0
126	(Azerbaijan) Khagani Mammadov	1993-1998	(-)	(-)	(-)	2 (0)	(0)	(-)	2 (0)	0
126	(Azerbaijan) Ceyhun Sultanov	1997-1998	(-)	(-)	(-)	2 (0)	(0)	(-)	2 (0)	0
126	(Azerbaijan) Ruslan Musayev	1997-1998	(-)	(-)	(-)	2 (0)	(0)	(-)	2 (0)	0
126	(Azerbaijan) Kamal Alekberov	2004-2005	(-)	(-)	(-)	2 (0)	(0)	(-)	2 (0)	0
126	(Russia) Anatoli Tebloyev	2004-2005	(-)	(-)	(-)	2 (0)	(0)	(-)	2 (0)	0
126	(Azerbaijan) Ruslan Qafitullin	1997-1999, 2005-2006	(-)	(-)	(-)	2 (0)	(0)	(-)	2 (0)	0
126	(North Macedonia) Slavčo Georgievski	2010-2012	(-)	(-)	(-)	2 (0)	(0)	(-)	2 (0)	0
126	(Brazil) Rodriguinho	2011-2012	(-)	(-)	(-)	2 (0)	(0)	(-)	2 (0)	0
126	(Azerbaijan) Javid Huseynov	2010-2012	(-)	(-)	(-)	2 (0)	(0)	(-)	2 (0)	0
126	(Azerbaijan) Rashad Abdullayev	2009-2012	(-)	(-)	(-)	2 (0)	(0)	(-)	2 (0)	0
126	(Belgium) Émile Mpenza	2010-2012	(-)	(-)	(-)	2 (0)	(0)	(-)	2 (0)	0
126	(Azerbaijan) Sasha Yunisoglu	2003, 2012	(-)	(-)	(-)	2 (0)	(0)	(-)	2 (0)	0
126	(Netherlands) Melvin Platje	2013-2014	(-)	(-)	(-)	2 (0)	(0)	(-)	2 (0)	0
126	(Spain) Melli	2015-2016	(-)	(-)	(-)	(-)	2 (0)	(-)	2 (0)	0
126	(Brazil) Ailton	2015-2016	(-)	(-)	(-)	(-)	2 (0)	(-)	2 (0)	0
126	(Azerbaijan) Magomed Kurbanov	2015-2016	(-)	(-)	(-)	(-)	2 (0)	(-)	2 (0)	0
126	(Azerbaijan) Kamal Gurbanov	2015-2017	(-)	(-)	(-)	(-)	2 (1)	(-)	2 (1)	0.5
126	(Azerbaijan) Nijat Gurbanov	2014-2015	(-)	(-)	(-)	(-)	2 (0)	(-)	2 (0)	0
126	(Croatia) Goran Paracki	2018-2019	(-)	(-)	(-)	(-)	2 (0)	(-)	2 (0)	0
126	(Azerbaijan) Mahammad Mirzabeyov	2017-2019	(-)	(-)	(-)	(-)	2 (0)	(-)	2 (0)	0
126	(Ghana) Kwame Karikari	2018-2019	(-)	(-)	(-)	(-)	2 (0)	(-)	2 (0)	0
126	(Croatia) Slavko Bralić	2018	(-)	(-)	(-)	(-)	2 (0)	(-)	2 (0)	0
126	(Brazil) Thallyson	2023-2024	(-)	(-)	(-)	(-)	(-)	2 (0)	2 (0)	0
126	(Brazil) Andre Shinyashiki	2023-2024	(-)	(-)	(-)	(-)	(-)	2 (0)	2 (0)	0
126	(Nigeria) Aaron Samuel Olanare	2023-2024	(-)	(-)	(-)	(-)	(-)	2 (0)	2 (0)	0
126	(Azerbaijan) Emil Balayev	2011-2014, 2023-Present	(-)	(-)	(-)	(-)	(-)	2 (0)	2 (0)	0
126	(Azerbaijan) Rufat Abbasov	2026-Present	(-)	(-)	(-)	(-)	(-)	2 (0)	2 (0)	0
126	(Brazil) Igor Ribeiro	2025-Present	(-)	(-)	(-)	(-)	(-)	2 (0)	2 (0)	0
126	(Azerbaijan) Murad Khachayev	2025-Present	(-)	(-)	(-)	(-)	(-)	2 (0)	2 (0)	0
126	(Guadeloupe) Andreaw Gravillon	2026-Present	(-)	(-)	(-)	(-)	(-)	2 (0)	2 (0)	0
126	(Mali) Falaye Sacko	2025-Present	(-)	(-)	(-)	(-)	(-)	2 (0)	2 (0)	0
126	(Benin) Sessi D'Almeida	2025-Present	(-)	(-)	(-)	(-)	(-)	2 (0)	2 (0)	0
126	(Azerbaijan) Emil Safarov	2024-Present	(-)	(-)	(-)	(-)	(-)	2 (0)	2 (0)	0
126	(Nigeria) Ifeanyi Mathew	2025-Present	(-)	(-)	(-)	(-)	(-)	2 (0)	2 (0)	0
126	(Brazil) Gustavo Klismahn	2026-Present	(-)	(-)	(-)	(-)	(-)	2 (0)	2 (0)	0
126	(Slovakia) Ľubomír Tupta	2026-Present	(-)	(-)	(-)	(-)	(-)	2 (0)	2 (0)	0
126	(Brazil) Breno Almeida	2026-Present	(-)	(-)	(-)	(-)	(-)	2 (1)	2 (1)	0.5
126	(Germany) Bassala Sambou	2025-Present	(-)	(-)	(-)	(-)	(-)	2 (0)	2 (0)	0
126	(France) Imad Faraj	2025-2026	(-)	(-)	(-)	(-)	(-)	2 (0)	2 (0)	0
182	(Azerbaijan) Qulammirza Asadullaev	1995-1996	1 (0)	(-)	(-)	(-)	(-)	(-)	1 (0)	0
182	(Azerbaijan) Aydin Alekperov	1996-1997	(-)	1 (0)	(-)	(-)	(-)	(-)	1 (0)	0
182	(Azerbaijan) Vladimir Poshekhontsev	1999-2000	(-)	1 (0)	(-)	(-)	(-)	(-)	1 (0)	0
182	(Russia) Magomed Magomedov	2000-2001	(-)	1 (0)	(-)	(-)	(-)	(-)	1 (0)	0
182	(Azerbaijan) Seymur Rahimov	2000-2001	(-)	1 (0)	(-)	(-)	(-)	(-)	1 (0)	0
182	(Azerbaijan) Namiq Yusifov	2007-2008	(-)	1 (0)	(-)	(-)	(-)	(-)	1 (0)	0
182	(Azerbaijan) Eshgin Guliyev	2006-2013	(-)	(-)	1 (0)	(-)	(-)	(-)	1 (0)	0
182	(Brazil) José Carlos	2008-2010	(-)	(-)	1 (1)	(-)	(-)	(-)	1 (1)	1
182	(Azerbaijan) Tarlan Makhmudov	1997-1998	(-)	(-)	(-)	1 (0)	(-)	(-)	1 (0)	0
182	(Georgia (country)) Shalva Isiani	2004-2005	(-)	(-)	(-)	1 (0)	(-)	(-)	1 (0)	0
182	(Brazil) Alessandro	2010-2012	(-)	(-)	(-)	1 (0)	(-)	(-)	1 (0)	0
182	(Azerbaijan) Ruslan Amirjanov	2009-2012	(-)	(-)	(-)	1 (0)	(-)	(-)	1 (0)	0
182	(Azerbaijan) Kamil Nurähmädov	2011-2013	(-)	(-)	(-)	(-)	1 (0)	(-)	1 (0)	0
182	(Azerbaijan) Kamran Najafzadeh	2015-2017	(-)	(-)	(-)	(-)	1 (0)	(-)	1 (0)	0
182	(Republic of the Congo) Agshin Gurbanli	2017-2018	(-)	(-)	(-)	(-)	1 (0)	(-)	1 (0)	0
182	(Azerbaijan) Tural Akhundov	2018-2022	(-)	(-)	(-)	(-)	1 (0)	(-)	1 (0)	0
182	(Azerbaijan) Jabir Amirli	2020-2021	(-)	(-)	(-)	(-)	1 (0)	(-)	1 (0)	0
182	(Iran) Saman Nariman Jahan	2020-2021	(-)	(-)	(-)	(-)	1 (0)	(-)	1 (0)	0
182	(Republic of the Congo) Prince Ibara	2020	(-)	(-)	(-)	(-)	1 (0)	(-)	1 (0)	0
182	(Portugal) Hugo Basto	2021-2022	(-)	(-)	(-)	1 (0)	(-)	(-)	1 (0)	0
182	(Azerbaijan) Kamran İbrahimov	2021-2022	(-)	(-)	(-)	(-)	(-)	1 (0)	1 (0)	0
182	(Azerbaijan) Vusal Asgarov	2021-2023	(-)	(-)	(-)	1 (0)	(-)	(-)	1 (0)	0
182	(Azerbaijan) Asim Alizade	2020-2022	(-)	(-)	(-)	(-)	1 (0)	(-)	1 (0)	0
182	(Azerbaijan) Rza Jafarov	2021-Present	(-)	(-)	(-)	(-)	(-)	1 (0)	1 (0)	0
182	(Senegal) Moustapha Seck	2024-Present	(-)	(-)	(-)	(-)	(-)	1 (0)	1 (0)	0

=== Goalscorers ===
As of match played 30 July 2026

	Name	Years	UEFA Cup Winners' Cup	UEFA Cup	UEFA Intertoto Cup	UEFA Champions League	UEFA Europa League	UEFA Conference League	Total	Ratio
1	(Azerbaijan) Emin Mahmudov	2017-Present	(-)	(-)	(-)	2 (5)	5 (13)	2 (11)	10 (29)	0.34
2	(Sierra Leone) Julius Wobay	2012-2015	(-)	(-)	(-)	3 (6)	2 (14)	(-)	5 (20)	0.25
3	(Azerbaijan) Rashad Sadiqov	2003-2008, 2012-2014; 2017-2018	(-)	0 (2)	2 (5)	1 (11)	1 (8)	(-)	4 (26)	0.15
4	(Azerbaijan) Javid Imamverdiyev	2008-2017	(-)	(-)	(-)	2 (8)	1 (12)	(-)	3 (20)	0.15
4	(Azerbaijan) Araz Abdullayev	2008-2011, 2012-2016	(-)	(-)	(-)	0 (6)	3 (19)	(-)	3 (25)	0.12
4	(Chile) Nicolás Canales	2012-2013, 2014-2015; 2016	(-)	(-)	(-)	1 (4)	2 (10)	(-)	3 (14)	0.21
4	(Cameroon) Ernest Webnje Nfor	2013-2015	(-)	(-)	(-)	(-)	3 (6)	(-)	3 (6)	0.5
4	(Azerbaijan) Namiq Ələsgərov	2017-2021	(-)	(-)	(-)	1 (7)	2 (3)	(-)	3 (10)	0.3
4	(Azerbaijan) Rahman Hajiyev	2015-2025	(-)	(-)	(-)	(-)	2 (12)	1 (8)	3 (20)	0.15
4	(France) Steeven Joseph-Monrose	2019-2021	(-)	(-)	(-)	(-)	3 (7)	(-)	3 (7)	0.43
4	(Brazil) Dário Júnior	2018, 2019-2020	(-)	(-)	(-)	(-)	3 (8)	(-)	3 (8)	0.38
4	(United States) Kenny Saief	2022-2023	(-)	(-)	(-)	(-)	(-)	3 (8)	3 (8)	0.38
13	(Azerbaijan) Vadim Vasilyev	1999-2002, 2003-2004	(-)	2 (4)	(-)	(-)	(-)	(-)	2 (4)	0.5
13	(Azerbaijan) Rashad Sadygov	2001-2002, 2003-2005; 2006-2008	(-)	1 (4)	1 (6)	0 (8)	(-)	(-)	2 (18)	0.11
13	(Slovenia) Tomislav Mišura	2005-2006	(-)	(-)	(-)	2 (4)	(-)	(-)	2 (4)	0.5
13	(Azerbaijan) Agil Mammadov	2003-2004, 2005-2007; 2007-2008	(-)	(-)	(-)	2 (4)	(-)	(-)	2 (4)	0.5
13	(Brazil) Flavinho	2010-2015	(-)	(-)	(-)	0 (8)	2 (14)	(-)	2 (22)	0.09
13	(Brazil) Denis Silva	2010-2012, 2013-2015	(-)	(-)	(-)	0 (4)	2 (2)	(-)	2 (6)	0.33
13	(France) Bagaliy Dabo	2018-2020	(-)	(-)	(-)	(-)	2 (4)	(-)	2 (4)	0.5
13	(Greece) Vangelis Platellas	2019-2020	(-)	(-)	(-)	(-)	2 (5)	(-)	2 (5)	0.4
13	(Senegal) Mamadou Mbodj	2019-2022	(-)	(-)	(-)	0 (4)	2 (8)	0 (5)	2 (17)	0.12
13	(Nigeria) Yusuf Lawal	2020-2022	(-)	(-)	(-)	0 (4)	0 (4)	2 (5)	2 (13)	0.15
13	(Morocco) Sabir Bougrine	2020-2022	(-)	(-)	(-)	0 (4)	2 (4)	0 (2)	2 (10)	0.2
13	(Azerbaijan) Eddy Israfilov	2022-2024	(-)	(-)	(-)	0 (3)	0 (0)	2 (6)	2 (9)	0.22
13	Own goal		0 (2)	0 (10)	0 (6)	1 (23)	0 (32)	1 (10)	2 (83)	0.02
26	(Azerbaijan) Vidadi Rzayev	1986-1991, 1991; 1995-1996, 1996-1998; 2003-2005	(-)	1 (2)	(-)	0 (6)	(-)	(-)	1 (8)	0.13
26	(Azerbaijan) Yashar Vahabzade	1983-1989, 1993-1997	(-)	1 (2)	(-)	0 (6)	(-)	(-)	1 (8)	0.13
26	(Azerbaijan) Mushfig Huseynov	2000-2001	(-)	1 (2)	(-)	(-)	(-)	(-)	1 (2)	0.5
26	(Azerbaijan) Bakhtiyar Musayev	1991-1995, 1998-2003; 2005-2006	0 (2)	1 (6)	(-)	0 (3)	(-)	(-)	1 (11)	0.09
26	(Azerbaijan) Samir Aliyev	1999-2000, 2001-2002; 2006-2010	(-)	1 (6)	0 (1)	(-)	(-)	(-)	1 (7)	0.14
26	(Azerbaijan) Branimir Subašić	2005-2008	(-)	1 (2)	(-)	0 (2)	(-)	(-)	1 (4)	0.25
26	(Brazil) José Carlos	2008-2010	(-)	(-)	1 (1)	(-)	(-)	(-)	1 (1)	1
26	(Georgia (country)) Georgi Adamia	2004-2008	(-)	0 (2)	1 (6)	0 (3)	(-)	(-)	1 (11)	0.09
26	(Azerbaijan) Elnur Allahverdiyev	2006-2009, 2014-2015	(-)	0 (2)	1 (6)	(-)	(-)	(-)	1 (8)	0.13
26	(Ukraine) Oleh Herasymyuk	2008	(-)	(-)	1 (6)	(-)	(-)	(-)	1 (6)	0.17
26	(Azerbaijan) Zaur Tagizade	2004-2010	(-)	0 (2)	0 (4)	1 (7)	(-)	(-)	1 (13)	0.08
26	(Azerbaijan) Emin Quliyev	2002, 2004-2005	(-)	(-)	(-)	1 (4)	(-)	(-)	1 (4)	0.25
26	(Azerbaijan) Nadir Nabiyev	2001-2004, 2005-2008	(-)	0 (3)	(-)	1 (4)	(-)	(-)	1 (7)	0.14
26	(Moldova) Vadim Boreț	2005-2008	(-)	0 (2)	(-)	1 (4)	(-)	(-)	1 (6)	0.17
26	(Azerbaijan) Mahir Shukurov	2006-2007, 2012-2014; 2016-2017	(-)	(-)	(-)	0 (2)	1 (7)	(-)	1 (9)	0.11
26	(Azerbaijan) Mirhüseyn Seyidov	2009-2015	(-)	(-)	(-)	0 (4)	1 (13)	(-)	1 (17)	0.06
26	(Brazil) Cardoso	2013-2015	(-)	(-)	(-)	0 (1)	1 (5)	(-)	1 (6)	0.17
26	(Azerbaijan) Kamal Gurbanov	2015-2017	(-)	(-)	(-)	(-)	1 (2)	(-)	1 (2)	0.5
26	(Azerbaijan) Ruslan Gurbanov	2010-2016	(-)	(-)	(-)	(-)	1 (9)	(-)	1 (9)	0.11
26	(Brazil) Jairo Rodrigues	2015-2017	(-)	(-)	(-)	(-)	1 (4)	(-)	1 (4)	0.25
26	(Azerbaijan) İsmayıl Zülfüqarlı	2019-2025	(-)	(-)	(-)	0 (3)	1 (3)	0 (4)	1 (10)	0.1
26	(Azerbaijan) Rauf Aliyev	2015, 2019	(-)	(-)	(-)	(-)	1 (6)	(-)	1 (6)	0.17
26	(Azerbaijan) Anton Kryvotsyuk	2017-2021	(-)	(-)	(-)	(-)	1 (10)	(-)	1 (10)	0.1
26	(Ghana) Godsway Donyoh	2022-2023	(-)	(-)	(-)	(-)	(-)	1 (4)	1 (4)	0.25
26	(Palestine) Ataa Jaber	2022-2024	(-)	(-)	(-)	(-)	(-)	1 (8)	1 (8)	0.13
26	(Collectivity of Saint Martin) Keelan Lebon	2023-2025	(-)	(-)	(-)	(-)	(-)	1 (4)	1 (4)	0.25
26	(Brazil) Breno Almeida	2026-Present	(-)	(-)	(-)	(-)	(-)	1 (2)	1 (2)	0.5

=== Clean sheets ===
As of match played 30 July 2026

	Name	Years	UEFA Cup Winners' Cup	UEFA Cup	UEFA Intertoto Cup	UEFA Champions League	UEFA Europa League	UEFA Conference League	Total	Ratio
1	(Serbia) Saša Stamenković	2011-2015	(-)	(-)	(-)	2 (5)	3 (14)	(-)	5 (19)	0.26
2	(Azerbaijan) Səlahət Ağayev	2017-2021	(-)	(-)	(-)	(-)	4 (8)	(-)	4 (8)	0.5
3	(Azerbaijan) Jahangir Hasanzade	1998-2002, 2004-2005	(-)	2 (6)	(-)	1 (3)	(-)	(-)	3 (9)	0.33
4	(Azerbaijan) Huseyn Mahammadov	2003-2005, 2007-2008	(-)	(-)	(-)	2 (4)	(-)	(-)	2 (4)	0.5
4	(Serbia) Vladimir Mićović	2005-2010	(-)	0 (2)	2 (6)	0 (2)	(-)	(-)	2 (10)	0.2
4	(Croatia) Krševan Santini	2016	(-)	(-)	(-)	(-)	2 (4)	(-)	2 (4)	0.5
7	(Azerbaijan) Elkhan Hasanov	1986-1991, 1993-1997; 2000-2001, 2003-2004	1 (2)	0 (2)	(-)	0 (2)	(-)	(-)	1 (6)	0.17
7	(Azerbaijan) Rauf Mehdiyev	1994-1996, 2010-2012	(-)	(-)	(-)	1 (3)	(-)	(-)	1 (3)	0.33
7	(Croatia) Ivan Brkić	2022-2024	(-)	(-)	(-)	(-)	(-)	1 (8)	1 (8)	0.13
7	(Azerbaijan) Emil Balayev	2011-2014, 2023-Present	(-)	(-)	(-)	(-)	(-)	1 (2)	1 (2)	0.5
11	(Azerbaijan) Agil Mammadov	2015-2016, 2017; 2019-2024	(-)	(-)	(-)	0 (4)	0 (6)	0 (2)	0 (12)	0
11	(Azerbaijan) Rza Jafarov	2021-Present	(-)	(-)	(-)	(-)	(-)	0 (1)	0 (1)	0

== Overall record ==
=== By competition ===
As of match played 17 August 2023

Competition	Pld	W	D	L	GF	GA	GD
UEFA Cup Winners' Cup	2	0	1	1	0	3	-3
UEFA Cup	10	3	1	6	9	19	-10
UEFA Intertoto Cup	6	3	1	2	7	7	0
UEFA Champions League	22	7	5	10	18	36	-18
UEFA Europa League	32	10	10	12	47	43	+4
UEFA Conference League	10	3	2	5	14	19	-5
Total	82	26	20	36	95	127	-32

=== By country ===
As of match played 17 August 2023

Country	Pld	W	D	L	GF	GA	GD	Win%
Albania	2	0	1	1	0	1	−1	0.00
Austria	4	2	0	2	5	7	−2	50.00
Belgium	4	2	1	1	3	6	−3	50.00
Bosnia and Herzegovina	4	2	1	1	6	4	+2	50.00
Bulgaria	2	1	0	1	2	7	−5	50.00
Croatia	2	0	1	1	0	3	−3	0.00
Cyprus	6	2	2	2	7	7	+0	33.33
Finland	2	0	1	1	2	5	−3	0.00
Georgia	6	4	2	0	12	6	+6	66.67
Greece	2	0	0	2	0	2	−2	0.00
Hungary	2	1	0	1	3	5	−2	50.00
Iceland	2	2	0	0	4	2	+2	100.00
Israel	6	0	3	3	8	17	−9	0.00
Italy	2	0	1	1	3	5	−2	0.00
Malta	2	1	0	1	3	2	+1	50.00
Moldova	2	2	0	0	9	0	+9	100.00
Montenegro	2	0	2	0	3	3	+0	0.00
North Macedonia	3	1	1	1	2	2	+0	33.33
Poland	2	0	0	2	0	10	−10	0.00
Romania	2	1	0	1	2	3	−1	50.00
Russia	6	2	1	3	4	4	+0	33.33
Serbia	4	0	2	2	4	6	−2	0.00
Slovakia	2	1	0	1	3	3	+0	50.00
Slovenia	6	2	1	3	5	6	−1	33.33
Turkey	3	0	0	3	3	8	−5	0.00
Yugoslavia	2	0	0	2	2	4	−2	0.00

=== By club ===
As of match played 17 August 2023

Opponent	Played	Won	Drawn	Lost	For	Against	Difference	Ratio
(Belgium) Anderlecht	2	1	0	1	1	5	−4	50.00
(Cyprus) APOEL	4	1	2	1	4	5	−1	25.00
(Cyprus) Aris Limassol	2	1	0	1	3	2	+1	50.00
(Russia) Arsenal Tula	2	2	0	0	4	0	+4	100.00
(Malta) Balzan	2	1	0	1	3	2	+1	50.00
(Belgium) Beerschot	2	1	1	0	2	1	+1	50.00
(Turkey) Beşiktaş	2	0	0	2	2	5	−3	0.00
(Israel) Bnei Yehuda Tel Aviv	2	0	1	1	3	4	−1	0.00
(Georgia (country)) Chikhura Sachkhere	2	1	1	0	3	2	+1	50.00
(Russia) CSKA Moscow	2	0	1	1	0	2	−2	0.00
(Georgia (country)) Dinamo Tbilisi	2	2	0	0	4	2	+2	100.00
(Croatia) Dinamo Zagreb	2	0	1	1	0	3	−3	0.00
(Iceland) Fimleikafélag Hafnarfjarðar	2	2	0	0	4	1	+3	100.00
(Turkey) Galatasaray	1	0	0	1	1	3	−2	0.00
(Slovenia) ND Gorica	4	1	1	2	2	4	−2	25.00
(Israel) Hapoel Ironi Kiryat Shmona	2	0	1	1	2	6	−4	0.00
(Finland) HJK	2	0	1	1	2	5	−3	0.00
(Italy) Inter Milan	2	0	1	1	3	5	−2	0.00
(Slovenia) Koper	2	1	0	1	3	2	+1	50.00
(Bulgaria) Lokomotiv 1929 Sofia	2	1	0	1	2	7	−5	50.00
(Israel) Maccabi Haifa	2	0	1	1	3	7	−4	0.00
(Slovakia) Mladost Podgorica	2	0	2	0	3	3	+0	0.00
(Slovakia) Nitra	2	1	0	1	3	3	+0	50.00
(Greece) Olympiacos	2	0	0	2	0	2	−2	0.00
(Serbia) Partizan	4	0	2	2	4	6	−2	0.00
(Austria) Rapid Wien	2	1	0	1	2	3	−1	50.00
(Serbia) Red Star Belgrade	2	0	0	2	2	4	−2	0.00
(Austria) SV Ried	2	1	0	1	3	4	−1	50.00
(Russia) Rubin Kazan	2	0	0	2	0	2	−2	0.00
(North Macedonia) Shkëndija	2	0	1	1	0	1	−1	0.00
(North Macedonia) Shkupi	1	1	0	0	2	1	+1	100.00
(Bosnia and Herzegovina) Široki Brijeg	2	1	0	1	2	2	+0	50.00
(Albania) Skënderbeu Korçë	2	0	1	1	0	1	−1	0.00
(Moldova) Speranța Nisporeni	2	2	0	0	9	0	+9	100.00
(Hungary) Újpest	2	1	0	1	3	5	−2	50.00
(Romania) Vaslui	2	1	0	1	2	3	−1	50.00
(Poland) Widzew Łódź	2	0	0	2	0	10	−10	0.00
(Bosnia and Herzegovina) Željezničar Sarajevo	2	1	1	0	4	2	+2	50.00
(Georgia (country)) Zestaponi	2	1	1	0	5	2	+3	50.00

== Non-UEFA competitions ==
In 2006, Neftçi managed to win the CIS Cup after defeating Kaunas in the final.

As of 29 June 2013

Competition	Matches	W	D	L	GF	GA	GD
CIS Cup	19	9	2	8	30	34	-4
Kadyrov Cup	4	3	0	1	10	4	+6
Subtotal	23	12	2	9	40	38	+2

Season	Tournament	Stage	Opponent		Date	Venue	Score	Result	Ref
Season	Tournament	Stage	Team	Country	Date	Venue	Score	Result	Ref
1992–93	CIS Cup	Group A	Skonto Riga	Latvia	25 January 1993	CSKA Universal Sports Hall, Moscow	0–1	3rd out of 3	
1992–93	CIS Cup	Group A	Spartak Moscow	Russia	27 January 1993	CSKA Universal Sports Hall, Moscow	0–8	3rd out of 3	
1994–95	CIS Cup	Group A	Zalgiris Vilnius	Lithuania	29 January 1995	Moscow	0–1	3rd out of 4	
1994–95	CIS Cup	Group A	Spartak Moscow	Russia	30 January 1995	Moscow	0–5	3rd out of 4	
1994–95	CIS Cup	Group A	Sitora Dushanbe	Tajikistan	31 January 1995	Moscow	1–0	3rd out of 4	
1996–97	CIS Cup	Group A	Spartak Moscow	Russia	25 January 1997	Moscow	2–4	4th out of 4	
1996–97	CIS Cup	Group A	Zimbru Chișinău	Moldova	26 January 1997	Moscow	1–2	4th out of 4	
1996–97	CIS Cup	Group A	Novbakhor Namangan	Uzbekistan	28 January 1997	Moscow	3–5	4th out of 4	
2004–05	CIS Cup	Group D	Sheriff Tiraspol	Moldova	15 January 2005	Moscow	1–0	1st out of 3	
2004–05	CIS Cup	Group D	Nebitçi Balkanabat	Turkmenistan	16 January 2005	Moscow	4–1	1st out of 3	
2004–05	CIS Cup	QF	Pyunik	Armenia	19 January 2005	Moscow	2–0		
2004–05	CIS Cup	SF	Dynamo Kyiv	Ukraine	21 January 2005	Moscow	2–1		
2004–05	CIS Cup	F	Lokomotiv Moscow	Russia	23 January 2005	Dynamo Stadium, Moscow	1–2		
2005–06	CIS Cup	Group B	Vakhsh	Tajikistan	14 January 2006	Moscow	3–0	1st out of 4	
2005–06	CIS Cup	Group B	Metalurgs	Latvia	15 January 2006	Olympic Stadium, Moscow	2–1	1st out of 4	
2005–06	CIS Cup	Group B	Aktobe	Kazakhstan	17 January 2006	Olympic Stadium, Moscow	1–1	1st out of 4	
2005–06	CIS Cup	QF	Pakhtakor	Uzbekistan	18 January 2006	Olympic Stadium, Moscow	0–0 (p. 4–2)		
2005–06	CIS Cup	SF	Pyunik	Armenia	20 January 2006	Moscow	3–0^{5}		
2005–06	CIS Cup	F	FBK Kaunas	Lithuania	22 January 2006	Olympic Stadium, Moscow	4–2		
2011–12	Kadyrov Cup	Group B	Metalist Kharkiv	Ukraine	29 January 2012	Antalya, Turkey	1–3	2nd out of 4	
2011–12	Kadyrov Cup	Group B	Polonia Warsaw	Poland	30 January 2012	Antalya, Turkey	3–1	2nd out of 4	
2011–12	Kadyrov Cup	Group B	Pakhtakor	Uzbekistan	1 February 2012	Antalya, Turkey	3–0	2nd out of 4	
2011–12	Kadyrov Cup	TP	Terek Grozny	Russia	3 February 2012	Antalya, Turkey	3–0		

Notes

- Note 5: Pyunik withdrew.

Result summary by country (Non-UEFA competitions)
Country	P	W	D	L	GF	GA	GD	Ref(s)
Russia	5	1	0	4	6	18	-12	
Uzbekistan	3	1	1	1	6	5	+1	
Moldova	2	1	0	1	2	2	=	
Tajikistan	2	2	0	0	4	0	+4	
Latvia	2	1	0	1	2	2	=	
Armenia	2	2	0	0	5	0	+5	
Lithuania	2	1	0	1	4	3	+1	
Ukraine	2	1	0	1	3	4	-1	
Turkmenistan	1	1	0	0	4	1	+3	
Kazakhstan	1	0	1	0	1	1	=	
Poland	1	1	0	0	3	1	+2	

Result summary by club (Non-UEFA competitions)
Club	Country	P	W	D	L	GF	GA	GD	Ref(s)
Spartak Moscow	Russia	3	0	0	3	2	17	-15	
Pyunik	Armenia	2	2	0	0	5	0	+5	
Pakhtakor	Uzbekistan	2	1	1	0	3	0	+3	
Skonto Riga	Latvia	1	0	0	1	0	1	-1	
Zalgiris Vilnius	Lithuania	1	0	0	1	0	1	-1	
Sitora Dushanbe	Tajikistan	1	1	0	0	1	0	+1	
Zimbru Chișinău	Moldova	1	0	0	1	1	2	-1	
Novbakhor Namangan	Uzbekistan	1	0	0	1	3	5	-2	
Sheriff Tiraspol	Moldova	1	1	0	0	1	0	+1	
Nebitçi Balkanabat	Turkmenistan	1	1	0	0	4	1	+3	
Dynamo Kyiv	Ukraine	1	1	0	0	2	1	+1	
Lokomotiv Moscow	Russia	1	0	0	1	1	2	-1	
Vakhsh	Tajikistan	1	1	0	0	3	0	+3	
Metalurgs	Latvia	1	1	0	0	2	1	+1	
Aktobe	Kazakhstan	1	0	1	0	1	1	=	
FBK Kaunas	Lithuania	1	1	0	0	4	2	+2	
Metalist Kharkiv	Ukraine	1	0	0	1	1	3	-2	
Polonia Warsaw	Poland	1	1	0	0	3	1	+2	
Terek Grozny	Russia	1	1	0	0	3	0	+3	

== World and European rankings ==
Neftçi were ranked in the top 250 until 2013. Their last ranking was from December 20, 2012.

=== Current club UEFA ranking ===
As of 20 January 2013

Rank	Country	Team	Points
223	(Croatia)	Slaven Belupo	5.916
224	(Slovakia)	Spartak Trnava	5.841
225	(Georgia (country))	Zestaponi	5.833
226	(Azerbaijan)	Neftçi	5.708
227	(Azerbaijan)	Qarabağ	5.708
228	(Belarus)	Dnepr Mogilev	5.675
229	(Denmark)	AGF Aarhus	5.640

- Full List

==== Current national league UEFA ranking ====
As of 27 June 2013

Rank	Team	Points
31	Georgia	9.166
32	Azerbaijan	8.541
33	Finland	8.508

- Full list

=== IFFHS World club ranking of the last decade ===
(1 January 2001 – 31 December 2012), Source: IFFHS published 21 March 2012

Rank	Team	Points
526	(United Arab Emirates) Al Ahli	515.0
527	(Algeria) Chabab Riadhi Belouizdad	514.5
528	(Bolivia) Club Deportivo San José	514.0
529	(Azerbaijan) Neftçi	512.5
530	(Turkey) Konyaspor	512.5
531	(India) East Bengal Kingfisher FC Kolkata	511.5
532	(Brazil) Esporte Clube Juventude	511.0

=== IFFHS Europe club ranking of the last decade ===
(1 January 2001 – 31 December 2012), Source: IFFHS published 21 March 2012

Rank	Team	Points
284	(Croatia) NK Osijek	520.0
285	(Denmark) Esbjerg fB	515.5
286	(Slovenia) NK Olimpija Ljubljana	515.5
287	(Azerbaijan) Neftçi	512.5
288	(Turkey) Konyaspor	512.5
289	(Turkey) MKE Ankaragücü	510.0
290	(Portugal) Associação Academica de Coimbra	509.5
