= 2014–15 Neftchi Baku PFK season =

Neftchi Baku
2014–15 season
- Chairman: Sadyg Sadygov
- Manager: Boyukagha Hajiyev (until 3 September 2014); Arif Asadov (from 4 September 2014)
- Stadium: Bakcell Arena
- Premier League: 4th
- Azerbaijan Cup: Runners-up
- Europa League: Play-off round vs Partizan
- Top goalscorer: League: Nicolás Canales (11); All: Nicolás Canales (14)
- Highest home attendance: 22,350 vs Partizan; 28 August 2014
- Lowest home attendance: 300 vs Inter Baku; 26 October 2014 vs Qaradağ; 3 December 2014 vs Baku; 1 April 2015
- Average home league attendance: 3,095; 29 May 2015
Home colours	Away colours	Third colours

The Neftchi Baku 2014–15 season was Neftchi Baku's 23rd Azerbaijan Premier League season. They started the season under manager Boyukagha Hajiyev, but he was replaced by Arif Asadov in September 2014. Neftchi finished 4th in the Azerbaijan Premier League, runners up in the 2014–15 Azerbaijan Cup, and reached the Play-off round of the 2014–15 UEFA Europa League.

== Squad ==
As of 3 February 2015

Note: Flags indicate national team as defined under FIFA eligibility rules; some limited exceptions apply. Players may hold more than one non-FIFA nationality.

No.	Pos.	Nation	Player
1	GK	AZE	Agil Mammadov
2	DF	BRA	Carlos Cardoso
3	DF	BRA	Denis Silva
4	DF	AZE	Rahil Mammadov
5	DF	AZE	Elvin Yunuszade
7	MF	AZE	Araz Abdullayev
8	MF	AZE	Elshan Abdullayev
9	MF	BRA	Flavinho (captain)
10	MF	SLE	Julius Wobay
11	FW	CHI	Nicolás Canales
12	GK	LAT	Pāvels Doroševs
15	MF	PAR	Éric Ramos
16	DF	AZE	Aziz Guliyev
17	MF	AZE	Rahman Hajiyev

No.	Pos.	Nation	Player
18	MF	BRA	Cauê
19	MF	AZE	Mirhuseyn Seyidov
20	FW	AZE	Fahmin Muradbayli
21	MF	AZE	Samir Masimov
22	FW	AZE	Rauf Aliyev
27	DF	AZE	Magsad Isayev
28	MF	AZE	Emin Mehdiyev
29	FW	AZE	Javid Muxtarzade
30	GK	SRB	Saša Stamenković
53	GK	AZE	Maksim Vaylo
88	FW	AZE	Mirkamil Hashimli
90	FW	CMR	Ernest Nfor
95	DF	AZE	Elvin Badalov

=== Out on loan ===
Note: Flags indicate national team as defined under FIFA eligibility rules; some limited exceptions apply. Players may hold more than one non-FIFA nationality.

No.	Pos.	Nation	Player
17	MF	AZE	Nijat Gurbanov (at (Azerbaijan) AZAL)
23	FW	AZE	Ruslan Qurbanov (at (Croatia) Hajduk Split)
25	MF	AZE	Javid Imamverdiyev (at (Turkey) Elazigspor)
—	GK	AZE	Rashad Azizli (at (Azerbaijan) Simurq)

No.	Pos.	Nation	Player
—	GK	AZE	Elchin Sadigov (at (Azerbaijan) Baku)
—	MF	AZE	Tanrıverdi Maharramli (at (Azerbaijan) Neftchala FK)
—	FW	AZE	Ilham Allahverdiyev (at (Azerbaijan) Qaradağ FK)

=== Reserve squad ===
Note: Flags indicate national team as defined under FIFA eligibility rules; some limited exceptions apply. Players may hold more than one non-FIFA nationality.

No.	Pos.	Nation	Player
4	DF	AZE	Rahil Mammadov
6	MF	AZE	Parviz Garaxanov
13	FW	AZE	Amrah Pashali
22	MF	AZE	Mirabdulla Abbasov
24	GK	AZE	Ruzi Giyasli
31	DF	AZE	Elmaddin Mammadov
33	MF	AZE	Orkhan Bashirov
35	DF	AZE	Shafi Bagirov
38	DF	AZE	Sarkhan Jabrayilov

No.	Pos.	Nation	Player
40	MF	AZE	Elkhan Aghayev
41	MF	AZE	Agshin Gurbanli
42	MF	AZE	Orxan Gurbanli
46	MF	AZE	Orkhan Sabirbayli
47	MF	AZE	Etibar Suleymanov
48	MF	AZE	Javidan Gaziyev
50	MF	AZE	Aleksandr Gross
51	MF	AZE	Elchin Asadov
54	MF	AZE	Oruc Ismayilov
56	FW	AZE	Pilagha Mehdiyev

== Transfers ==
=== Summer ===
In: Note: Flags indicate national team as defined under FIFA eligibility rules; some limited exceptions apply. Players may hold more than one non-FIFA nationality.

No.	Pos.	Nation	Player
1	GK	AZE	Emil Balayev (loan return from (Azerbaijan) Araz-Naxçıvan)
10	MF	SLE	Julius Wobay (loan return from (United Arab Emirates) Al-Shaab CSC)
11	FW	CHI	Nicolás Canales (from (Chile) Colo-Colo)
14	DF	AZE	Elnur Allahverdiyev (from (Azerbaijan) Gabala)
15	MF	PAR	Éric Ramos (from (Paraguay) Rubio Ñu, previously on loan)
17	MF	AZE	Nijat Gurbanov (loan return from (Azerbaijan) Simurq)
18	MF	BRA	Cauê (from (Romania) FC Vaslui)

Out: Note: Flags indicate national team as defined under FIFA eligibility rules; some limited exceptions apply. Players may hold more than one non-FIFA nationality.

No.	Pos.	Nation	Player
4	DF	AZE	Tärlän Quliyev (to (Azerbaijan) Qarabağ)
5	DF	MKD	Igor Mitreski (Retired)
6	MF	AZE	Rashad Sadiqov (to (Azerbaijan) Khazar Lankaran)
11	FW	NED	Melvin Platje (to (Netherlands) Venlo)
14	FW	UZB	Bahodir Nasimov (to (Iran) Padideh)
22	DF	AZE	Mahir Shukurov (to (Turkey) Karşıyaka)
25	MF	AZE	Javid Imamverdiyev (on loan to (Turkey) Elazigspor)

=== Winter ===
In: Note: Flags indicate national team as defined under FIFA eligibility rules; some limited exceptions apply. Players may hold more than one non-FIFA nationality.

No.	Pos.	Nation	Player
1	GK	AZE	Agil Mammadov (from (Azerbaijan) Baku)
16	DF	AZE	Aziz Guliyev (from (Azerbaijan) Baku)
17	MF	AZE	Rahman Hajiyev (from (Azerbaijan) Baku, previously on loan to (Turkey) Gaziantep BB)
22	FW	AZE	Rauf Aliyev (from (Azerbaijan) Khazar Lankaran)
—	GK	AZE	Elchin Sadigov (loan return from (Azerbaijan) Araz-Naxçıvan)

Out: Note: Flags indicate national team as defined under FIFA eligibility rules; some limited exceptions apply. Players may hold more than one non-FIFA nationality.

No.	Pos.	Nation	Player
1	GK	AZE	Emil Balayev (to (Germany) Eintracht Frankfurt)
14	DF	AZE	Elnur Allahverdiyev
16	DF	BRA	Bruno Bertucci (to (Brazil) Portuguesa)
17	MF	AZE	Nijat Gurbanov (on loan to (Azerbaijan) AZAL)
23	FW	AZE	Ruslan Qurbanov (loan to (Croatia) Hajduk Split)
—	GK	AZE	Elchin Sadigov (on loan to (Azerbaijan) Baku)

== The board of directors ==
Position	Name
President	(Azerbaijan) Sadıq Sadıqov
Vice-President	(Azerbaijan) Elnur Mammadov
Executive director	(Azerbaijan) Mubariz Khudiyev
Press and Operations Officer	(Azerbaijan) Gunduz Abbaszade
Adviser	(Azerbaijan) Elnur Ashrafoglu
Head of Security Service	(Azerbaijan) Vagif Musayev
Source: Neftchi Baku PFK

=== Coaching staff ===
Position	Staff
Manager	(Azerbaijan) Arif Asadov
Assistant first team coach	(Azerbaijan) Elmir Khankishiyev
Assistant first team coach	(Azerbaijan) Nazim Aliyev
Selection coach	(Azerbaijan) Bakhtiyar Musayev
Goalkeeper coach	(Latvia) Pāvels Doroševs
Fitness coach	(Romania) Carmel Barbulescu
Club doctor	(Azerbaijan) Boris Khatagurov
Assistant doctor	(Azerbaijan) Rasim Gadimaliev
Assistant doctor	(Azerbaijan) Tofig Gasimov
Physiotherapist	(Azerbaijan) Zakir Guliyev
Source: Neftchi Baku PFC

== Friendlies ==
17 June 2014	Neftchi Baku (Azerbaijan)	2 – 3	(Georgia (country)) Chikhura Sachkhere	Turkey
AZST (UTC+5)	Masimov 19'; Denis 34'	Summary	Odikadze 11' (pen.), 83'; Mumladze 90+2'

20 June 2014	Neftchi Baku (Azerbaijan)	1 – 1	(Georgia (country)) Chikhura Sachkhere	Turkey
18:30 AZST (UTC+5)	Wobay	Summary	Goal

25 June 2014	Neftchi Baku (Azerbaijan)	3 – 1	(Saudi Arabia) Al-Qadisiyah	Turkey
AZST (UTC+5)	Wobay; Qurbanov; N.Gurbanov	Summary	Goal

3 July 2014	Neftchi Baku (Azerbaijan)	2 – 2	(Ukraine) Dynamo Kyiv	Turkey
AZST (UTC+5)	Flavinho 40'; Nfor 51'	[ Summary]	Rybalka 31'; Yarmolenko 35'

6 July 2014	Neftchi Baku (Azerbaijan)	1 – 2	(Germany) Dynamo Dresden	Turkey
19:30 AZST (UTC+5)	Masimov 7'	Summary	15'; 56'

14 January 2015	Hajer (Saudi Arabia)	1 – 3	(Azerbaijan) Neftchi Baku	Antalya, Turkey
AZT (UTC+4)	Aldosari 60'	Report	Masimov 3'; Aliyev 50', 63'

17 January 2014	Erciyesspor (Turkey)	0 – 0	(Azerbaijan) Neftchi Baku	Antalya, Turkey
AZT (UTC+4)		Report

20 January 2014	Elazığspor (Turkey)	1 – 0	(Azerbaijan) Neftchi Baku	Antalya, Turkey
17:00 AZT (UTC+4)	Goal	Report		Stadium: Mardan Stadium

21 January 2014	Volyn Lutsk (Ukraine)	3 – 4	(Azerbaijan) Neftchi Baku	Antalya, Turkey
AZT (UTC+4)	Goal	Report	Goal

23 January 2014	Petrolul Ploiești (Romania)	0 – 1	(Azerbaijan) Neftchi Baku	Antalya, Turkey
AZT (UTC+4)		Report	Denis 38'

== Competitions ==
=== Azerbaijan Supercup ===
13 August 2014	Neftchi Baku	Postponed	Qarabağ	Qabala
AZST (UTC+5)		[ Summary]		Stadium: Gabala City Stadium

=== Azerbaijan Premier League ===
==== Results summary ====
Overall								Home						Away					
Pld	W	D	L	GF	GA	GD	Pts	W	D	L	GF	GA	GD	W	D	L	GF	GA	GD
32	13	10	9	38	33	+5	49	7	5	4	20	15	+5	6	5	5	18	18	0

Last updated: 28 May 2015.
Source: Soccerway

==== Results ====
10 August 2014 1	Araz-Naxçıvan	Annulled^{2}	Neftchi Baku	Nakhchivan
18:00 AZST (UTC+5)	D.Janalidze 52', 90+4'; E.Chobanov (yellow card) 62' (goal) 81'; A.Mammadov (yellow card) 72'; B.Nəsirov (yellow card) 85'	Summary	E.Abdullayev (yellow card) 30'; E.Mehdiyev (yellow card) 42'; Denis (yellow card) 49'	Stadium: Nakhchivan City Stadium; Attendance: 7,500; Referee: Fariz Yusifov

16 August 2014 2	Neftchi Baku	1 – 0	Baku	Baku
19:00 AZST (UTC+5)	Wobay 22'; Badalov (yellow card) 89'	Summary	Aliyev (yellow card) 15'; N.Gurbanov (yellow card) 77'; N.Novruzov (yellow card) 81'; Travner (yellow card) 90'	Stadium: Bakcell Arena; Attendance: 700; Referee: Omar Paşayev

25 August 2014 3	AZAL	Postponed	Neftchi Baku	Baku
19:00 AZST (UTC+5)		Summary		Stadium: AZAL Arena; Referee: Orkhan Mämmädov

31 August 2014 4	Neftchi Baku	2 – 1	Simurq	Baku
18:00 AZST (UTC+5)	Abdullayev 2'; E.Mehdiyev (yellow card) 19'; Wobay 47'; Ramos (yellow card) 75'; Stamenković (yellow card) 90+4'	Summary	Cardoso 54' (o.g.); Qirtimov (yellow card) 63'; Třešňák (yellow card) 89'	Stadium: Bakcell Arena; Attendance: 1,150; Referee: Orkhan Mämmädov

13 September 2014 5	Neftchi Baku	1 – 0	Khazar Lankaran	Baku
17:30 AZST (UTC+5)	Flavinho 28' (yellow card) 38'; Stamenković (red card) 40'; Yunuszade (yellow card) 52'; Doroševs (yellow card) 74'; Bruno (yellow card) 87'	Summary	Amirguliyev (yellow card) 38'; Thiego (yellow card) 63' (yellow-red card) 90+3'	Stadium: Ismat Gayibov Stadium; Attendance: 2,000; Referee: Aliyar Ağayev

21 September 2014 6	Gabala	0 – 0	Neftchi Baku	Qabala
18:00 AZST (UTC+5)	Ropotan (yellow card) 13'; Amirjanov (yellow card) 28'; Farkaš (yellow card) 90+3'	Summary	Seyidov (yellow card) 37'; M.Isayev (yellow card) 39'; Cauê (yellow card) 79'; Ramos (yellow card) 88'	Stadium: Gabala City Stadium; Attendance: 2,500; Referee: Elvin Äsgärov

27 September 2014 7	Neftchi Baku	1 – 3	Qarabağ	Baku
16:00 AZST (UTC+5)	Nfor (yellow card) 24' (goal) 87'; Allahverdiyev (yellow card) 32'; Cardoso (yellow card) 34'; Ramos (yellow card) 37'	Summary	Reynaldo (yellow card) 14'; Richard 35' (pen.); Muarem 76'; Nadirov 85'	Stadium: Ismat Gayibov Stadium; Attendance: 2,000; Referee: Orkhan Mämmädov

17 October 2014 8	Sumgayit	0 – 1	Neftchi Baku	Sumqayit
16:00 AZST (UTC+5)	Chertoganov (yellow card) 67'; S.Alkhasov (yellow card) 90'	Summary	Nfor 12'; Allahverdiyev (yellow card) 26'; Yunuszade (yellow card) 43'; M.Isayev (yellow card) 76'; Seyidov (yellow card) 89'	Stadium: Kapital Bank Arena; Referee: Omar Paşayev

26 October 2014 9	Neftchi Baku	0 – 0	Inter Baku	Baku
16:00 AZT (UTC+4)	Allahverdiyev (yellow card) 37'; Seyidov (yellow card) 38'; Yunuszade (yellow card) 69'	Summary	Nildo (yellow card) 80'	Stadium: Ismat Gayibov Stadium; Attendance: 300; Referee: Fariz Yusifov

29 October 2014 10	Baku	1 – 3	Neftchi Baku	Baku
14:00 AZT (UTC+4)	N.Novruzov 55' (yellow card) 65'; A.Guliyev (yellow card) 67'; Jabá (yellow card) 70'	Summary	Wobay 38'; Ramos (yellow card) 60'; Abdullayev 62'; Cauê 85'	Stadium: Tofik Bakhramov Stadium; Attendance: 200; Referee: Ramil Diniyev

2 November 2014 11	Neftchi Baku	4 – 0	AZAL	Baku
17:15 AZT (UTC+4)	E.Yagublu 10' (o.g.); Denis 38'; Canales 71', 85'; E.Abdullayev (yellow card) 73'	Summary	Ramos (yellow card) 80' (yellow-red card) 82'; Córdoba (yellow card) 84'	Stadium: Bakcell Arena; Attendance: 1,000; Referee: Aliyar Ağayev

20 November 2014 12	Simurq	1 – 0	Neftchi Baku	Zaqatala
15:00 AZT (UTC+4)	Stanojević (yellow card) 14'; Ćeran 18' (pen.); Qirtimov (yellow card) 63'; Kapsa (yellow card) 90+3'	Summary	E.Balayev (yellow card) 18'; Cardoso (yellow card) 19'; M.Isayev (yellow card) 29'	Stadium: Zaqatala City Stadium; Attendance: 3,500; Referee: Fariz Yusifov

24 November 2014 13	Khazar Lankaran	2 – 2	Neftchi Baku	Baku
17:00 AZT (UTC+4)	Ivanov 5' (yellow card) 13'; Ismayilov 35' (red card) 74'; S.Tounkara (red card) 45+2'; Sadiqov (yellow card) 54'; Sankoh (yellow card) 90+2'	Summary	Qurbanov 10'; Allahverdiyev (yellow card) 11' (yellow-red card) 50'; E.Balayev (red card) 16'; Flavinho (yellow card) 30'; Nfor (yellow card) 39'; Seyidov (yellow card) 40' (goal) 90+4'; Cardoso (yellow card) 68'; N.Gurbanov (yellow card) 90+4'	Stadium: Dalga Arena; Attendance: 1,200; Referee: Elvin Äsgärov

29 November 2014 14	Neftchi Baku	0 – 0	Gabala	Baku
17:00 AZT (UTC+4)	Yunuszade (yellow card) 46'; Flavinho (yellow card) 46'; Cauê (yellow card) 66'; Badalov (yellow card) 89'	Summary	Huseynov (yellow card) 73'; Abışov (yellow card) 79'	Stadium: Bakcell Arena; Attendance: 1,000; Referee: Ingilab Mämmädov

7 December 2014 15	Qarabağ	0 – 0	Neftchi Baku	Baku
15:15 AZT (UTC+4)	Richard (yellow card) 45+1'; Guseynov (yellow card) 64'; Emeghara (yellow card) 80'	Summary	Abdullayev (yellow card) 45+1'	Stadium: Tofiq Bahramov Stadium^{1} Attendance: 3,000; Referee: Aliyar Ağayev

14 December 2014 16	Neftchi Baku	3 – 2	Sumgayit	Baku
17:00 AZT (UTC+4)	M.Isayev (yellow card) 23'; Qurbanov 51', 73'; Seyidov (yellow card) 54'; Abdullayev 56'	Summary	Mammadov (yellow card) 43'; O.Aliyev 34', 64'	Stadium: Bakcell Arena; Attendance: 2,000; Referee: Ramil Diniyev

18 December 2014 17	Inter Baku	2 – 1	Neftchi Baku	Baku
17:00 AZT (UTC+4)	Bocognano (yellow card) 32'; Nildo 63'; Mirzabekov 71'; Álvaro (yellow card) 87'	Summary	Canales 41'; Abdullayev (yellow card) 43'; Yunuszade (yellow card) 52'; Cardoso (yellow card) 74'; Seyidov (yellow card) 80'; Flavinho (yellow card) 90'; N.Gurbanov (yellow card) 90+1'	Stadium: Inter Arena; Attendance: 1,000; Referee: Aliyar Ağayev

20 December 2014 18	Neftchi Baku	– ^{2}	Araz-Naxçıvan	Baku
AZT (UTC+4)		[ Summary]		Stadium: Bakcell Arena

31 January 2015 19	AZAL	2 – 1	Neftchi Baku	Baku
15:00 AZT (UTC+4)	Mombongo-Dues 26', 90+2'	Summary	Canales 68' (pen.)	Stadium: AZAL Arena; Attendance: 350; Referee: Elvin Äsgärov

6 February 2015 20	Neftchi Baku	0 – 0	Simurq	Baku
16:00 AZT (UTC+4)	Yunuszade (yellow card) 51'; Cardoso (yellow card) 71'; Ramos (yellow card) 80'; Denis (yellow card) 90+2'	Summary	R.Eyyubov (yellow card) 84'	Stadium: Bakcell Arena; Attendance: 1,000; Referee: Aliyar Ağayev

11 February 2015 21	Neftchi Baku	2 – 0	Khazar Lankaran	Baku
16:00 AZT (UTC+4)	Yunuszade (yellow card) 12'; Wobay 66'; Masimov 69'	Summary	Jalilov (yellow card) 32'; Amirguliyev (yellow card) 38'	Stadium: Bakcell Arena; Attendance: 2,000; Referee: Ramil Diniyev

15 February 2015 22	Gabala	1 – 3	Neftchi Baku	Qabala
18:00 AZT (UTC+4)	Mendy 10' (yellow card) 45'	Summary	Ramos (yellow card) 32'; Seyidov (yellow card) 45+1'; Wobay 58' (yellow card) 88'; Denis 71'; Flavinho 87'; E.Mehdiyev (yellow card) 87'	Stadium: Gabala City Stadium; Attendance: 1,500

19 February 2015 23	Neftchi Baku	0 – 1	Qarabağ	Baku
19:00 AZT (UTC+4)	Ramos (yellow card) 36'; Cardoso (yellow card) 57'; Aliyev (yellow card) 66'; Flavinho (yellow card) 71'	Summary	Medvedev (yellow card) 69'; Muarem (yellow card) 71'; Reynaldo 89'; George (yellow card) 90+1'; N.Alasgarov (yellow card) 90+3'	Stadium: Bakcell Arena; Attendance: 4,500; Referee: Aliyar Ağayev

24 February 2015 3	AZAL	0 – 1	Neftchi Baku	Baku
15:00 AZT (UTC+4)	Juanfran (yellow card) 53'	Summary	Canales 8'; Cardoso (yellow card) 11'; M.Isayev (yellow card) 27'; Yunuszade (yellow card) 57'; Mammadov (yellow card) 70'; Flavinho (yellow card) 79'; E.Mehdiyev (yellow card) 88'	Stadium: AZAL Arena; Attendance: 800; Referee: Elvin Äsgärov

28 February 2015 24	Sumgayit	0 – 1	Neftchi Baku	Sumqayit
16:00 AZT (UTC+4)	Chertoganov (yellow card) 44'; O.Aliyev (yellow card) 45+1'	Summary	M.Isayev (yellow card) 11'; A.Guliyev (yellow card) 69'; Canales (yellow card) 75' (goal) 83'	Stadium: Kapital Bank Arena; Attendance: 1,200; Referee: Ramil Diniyev

8 March 2015 25	Neftchi Baku	0 – 2	Inter Baku	Baku
15:00 AZT (UTC+4)	Ramos (yellow card) 57'; Cardoso (yellow card) 60'; Flavinho (yellow card) 60'; Wobay (yellow card) 78'	Summary	M.Isayev 49' (o.g.); Salukvadze (yellow card) 54'; Aghayev (yellow card) 77'; Stanković (yellow card) 77'; A.Mammadov 87'	Stadium: Bakcell Arena; Attendance: 1,500; Referee: Fariz Yusifov

17 March 2015 26	Araz-Naxçıvan	– ^{2}	Neftchi Baku	Nakhchivan
AZST (UTC+5)		[ Summary]		Stadium: Nakhchivan City Stadium

1 April 2015 27	Neftchi Baku	2 – 0	Baku	Baku
17:00 AZST (UTC+5)	A.Guliyev (yellow card) 6'; Canales (yellow card) 36' (goal) 42'; Wobay 65'	Summary	G.liyev (yellow card) 11'; K.Nurähmädov (yellow card) 71'	Stadium: Bakcell Arena; Attendance: 300; Referee: Xalil Xälilov

5 April 2015 28	Simurq	0 – 1	Neftchi Baku	Zaqatala
17:00 AZST (UTC+5)	V.Mustafayev (yellow card) 64'; A.Agajanov (yellow card) 73'	Summary	Ramos (yellow card) 21'; Seyidov (yellow card) 52'; Cardoso (yellow card) 65' (red card) 74'; A.Guliyev (yellow card) 72'; Canales 76' (yellow card) 77'; Mammadov (yellow card) 90+4'	Stadium: Zaqatala City Stadium; Attendance: 2,500; Referee: Ingilab Mämmädov

9 April 2015 29	Khazar Lankaran	2 – 2	Neftchi Baku	Lankaran
17:00 AZST (UTC+5)	Sankoh (yellow card) 30' (yellow-red card) 33'; Amirguliyev 62' (yellow card) 90'; Scarlatache 74'; S.Tounkara (yellow card) 76'; E.Rzazadä (yellow card) 78'	Summary	Wobay 13'; Ramos 26'; Flavinho (yellow card) 35'; Yunuszade (yellow card) 51'; E.Mehdiyev (yellow card) 56'	Stadium: Lankaran City Stadium; Attendance: 4,500; Referee: Aliyar Ağayev

17 April 2015 30	Neftchi Baku	1 – 3	Gabala	Baku
20:00 AZST (UTC+5)	Canales 44'; Denis (yellow card) 54'; Cauê (yellow card) 61'; E.Mehdiyev (yellow card) 71'	Summary	Gai 25'; Huseynov 50'; U.Abbasov (yellow card) 54'; E.Jamalov (yellow card) 61'; Mendy (yellow card) 86'	Stadium: Bakcell Arena; Attendance: 1,500; Referee: Aliyar Ağayev

25 April 2015 31	Qarabağ	3 – 2	Neftchi Baku	Baku
19:00 AZST (UTC+5)	Muarem 15' (yellow card) 43'; J.Taghiyev 29'; George 69'; Agolli (yellow card) 73'	Summary	A.Abdullayev 32' (yellow card) 67'; Ramos (yellow card) 39'; Canales 59'; Cardoso (yellow card) 71' (yellow-red card) 75'; Nfor (yellow card) 81'	Stadium: Tofiq Bahramov Stadium^{1} Attendance: 5,000; Referee: Fariz Yusifov

1 May 2015 32	Neftchi Baku	2 – 2	Sumgayit	Baku
20:00 AZST (UTC+5)	Canales 14' (red card) 45'; A.Quliyev (yellow card) 47'; Masimov 87'	Summary	S.Alkhasov 10'; Kurbanov 18' (yellow card) 90'; Chertoganov (yellow card) 32'; T.Mikayilov (yellow card) 79'	Stadium: Bakcell Arena; Attendance: 1,200; Referee: Orkhan Mämmädov

8 May 2015 33	Inter Baku	0 – 4	Neftchi Baku	Baku
20:00 AZST (UTC+5)	J.Diniyev (yellow card) 37'; Tskhadadze 45', 55'; Meza 49'; Aghayev (red card) 65' Mammadov 90+1'	Summary	Ramos (yellow card) 59'; Seyidov (red card) 90'	Stadium: Inter Arena; Attendance: 1,500; Referee: Ingilab Mämmädov

14 May 2015 34	Neftchi Baku	– ^{2}	Araz-Naxçıvan	Baku
AZST (UTC+5)		[ Summary]		Stadium: Bakcell Arena

22 May 2015 35	Baku	0 – 0	Neftchi Baku	Baku
18:00 AZST (UTC+5)	Pelagias (yellow card) 63'	Summary	Nfor (yellow card) 25'; Stamenković (yellow card) 35'; Badalov (yellow card) 74'; Cauê (yellow card) 76'; Denis (yellow card) 87'	Stadium: Tofik Bakhramov Stadium; Attendance: 800; Referee: Rahim Häsänov

28 May 2015 36	Neftchi Baku	1 – 1	AZAL	Baku
20:00 AZST (UTC+5)	Ramos (yellow card) 43'; E.Abdullayev 60'; A.Guliyev (red card) 75'; E.Mehdiyev (yellow card) 81'; Mammadov (yellow card) 90'	Summary	S.Asadov (yellow card) 20'; K.Diniyev (yellow card) 41'; O.Lalayev (yellow card) 44' (yellow-red card) 55'; N.Gurbanov 84'; K.Bayramov (yellow card) 90+5'	Stadium: Bakcell Arena; Attendance: 500; Referee: Elvin Äsgärov

==== League table ====
Pos	Team	Pld	W	D	L	GF	GA	GD	Pts	Qualification
1	Qarabağ (C)	32	20	8	4	51	28	+23	68	Qualification for Champions League second qualifying round
2	Inter Baku	32	17	12	3	55	20	+35	63	Qualification for Europa League first qualifying round
3	Gabala	32	15	9	8	46	35	+11	54	Qualification for Europa League first qualifying round
4	Neftchi Baku	32	13	10	9	38	33	+5	49	Qualification for Europa League first qualifying round
5	Simurq	32	11	6	15	41	39	+2	39	
6	AZAL	32	10	9	13	37	42	−5	39	
7	Khazar Lankaran	32	8	8	16	35	46	−11	32	
8	Sumgayit	32	7	10	15	32	43	−11	31	
9	Baku	32	3	8	21	19	68	−49	17	Relegation to the Azerbaijan First Division
10	Araz-Naxçıvan (Note: Araz-Naxçıvan were officially withdrawn from the league on 17 November 2014)	0	0	0	0	0	0	0	0	Team withdrawn

Source: uefa.com
Rules for classification: 1) points; 2) head-to-head points; 3) head-to-head goal difference; 4) head-to-head goals scored; 5. head-to-head away goals (only if 2 teams are tied); 6) goal difference; 7) goals scored.
(C) Champions

=== Azerbaijan Cup ===
3 December 2014 Second round	Neftchi Baku	3 – 0	Qaradağ	Baku
13:00 AZT (UTC+4)	Nfor 17'; Cauê (yellow card) 68'; Qurbanov 75'; Denis 78'	Summary	A.Häsänov (yellow card) 68'	Stadium: Ismat Gayibov Stadium; Attendance: 300; Referee: Vusal Äliyev

4 March 2015 Quarterfinals 1st leg	Neftchi Baku	0 – 0	AZAL	Baku
17:00 AZT (UTC+4)	Aliyev (yellow card) 34'; Ramos (yellow card) 47'; Flavinho (yellow card) 82'	Summary	Kļava (yellow card) 49'; V.Igbekoi (yellow card) 65'	Stadium: Bakcell Arena; Attendance: 1,000; Referee: Ingilab Mämmädov

13 March 2015 Quarterfinals 2nd leg	AZAL	0 – 1 (0 – 1 agg.)	Neftchi Baku	Baku
15:00 AZT (UTC+4)	Kutsenko (yellow card) 26'	Summary	Wobay 19'; Masimov (yellow card) 25'; Ramos (yellow card) 45'; M.Isayev (yellow card) 47'; Yunuszade (yellow card) 63'	Stadium: AZAL Arena; Attendance: 400; Referee: Ingilab Mämmädov

13 April 2015 Semifinal 1st leg	Neftchi Baku	2 – 0	Inter Baku	Baku
19:00 AZT (UTC+4)	Yunuszade (yellow card) 12'; Canales 19', 71'; Seyidov (yellow card) 62'	Summary	J.Diniyev (yellow card) 8'; Aghayev (yellow card) 20'	Stadium: Bakcell Arena; Attendance: 1,500; Referee: Ingilab Mämmädov

21 April 2015 Semifinal 2nd leg	Inter Baku	1 – 2 (1 – 3 agg.)	Neftchi Baku	Baku
19:00 AZT (UTC+4)	Abatsiyev (yellow card) 17'; Dashdemirov 37'; D.Meza (yellow card) 45+1'; Tskhadadze 57'	Summary	E.Mehdiyev (yellow card) 19'; Canales 27'; Ramos (yellow card) 57'; A.Guliyev (yellow card) 82'; Abdullayev (yellow card) 90+3'	Stadium: Inter Arena; Attendance: 1,500; Referee: Elvin Äsgärov

==== Final ====
3 June 2015 Final	Qarabağ	3 – 1	Neftchi Baku	Qabala
20:00 AZST (UTC+5)	Reynaldo 5', 39'; Muarem 85'	Summary	Nfor 77'; Cardoso (yellow card) 81'	Stadium: Gabala City Stadium; Attendance: 4,500; Referee: Rähim Häsänov

=== UEFA Europa League ===
==== Qualifying rounds ====
17 July 2014 Second qualifying round 1st leg	Neftchi Baku (Azerbaijan)	1 – 2	(Slovenia) Koper	Baku, Azerbaijan
20:00 AZST (UTC+5)	Abdullayev 45+1'; Cardoso (yellow card) 52'; Flavinho (yellow card) 54'; Ramos (yellow card) 90'	Report	Galešić 24'; Palčič 41'; Guberac (yellow card) 52'; Halilović (yellow card) 67'	Stadium: Bakcell Arena; Attendance: 9,500; Referee: Dzianis Shcharbakou (Belarus)

24 July 2014 Second qualifying round 2nd leg	Koper (Slovenia)	0 – 2 (2 – 3 agg.)	(Azerbaijan) Neftchi Baku	Koper, Slovenia
23:30 AZST (UTC+5)	Guberac (yellow card) 25'; Štromajer (yellow card) 28' (yellow-red card) 51'; Črnigoj (yellow card) 64'; Galešić (yellow card) 79'	Report	M.Seyidov 21'; Cardoso (yellow card) 18' (goal) 84'; Ramos (yellow card) 79'	Stadium: Bonifika; Attendance: 1,800; Referee: Benoît Millot (France)

31 July 2014 Third qualifying round 1st leg	Neftchi Baku (Azerbaijan)	0 – 0	(Georgia (country)) Chikhura Sachkhere	Baku, Azerbaijan
20:00 AZST (UTC+5)		Report	Datunaishvili (yellow card) 48'	Stadium: Bakcell Arena; Attendance: 10,800; Referee: Cristian Balaj (Romania)

7 August 2014 Third qualifying round 2nd leg	Chikhura Sachkhere (Georgia (country))	2 – 3 (2 – 3 agg.)	(Azerbaijan) Neftchi Baku	Tbilisi, Georgia
23:00 AZST (UTC+5)	Gabedava 30', 50' (yellow card) 68'; Datunaishvili (yellow card) 85'; Rekhviashvili (yellow card) 90+2'	Report	Nfor 16', 27', 38'; Cauê (yellow card) 20'; Cardoso (yellow card) 52'; Bruno (yellow card) 63'; Yunuszade (yellow card) 68'; Masimov (yellow card) 74'	Stadium: Mikheil Meskhi Stadium; Attendance: 21,359; Referee: Tamás Bognár (Hungary)

21 August 2014 Play-off round 1st leg	Partizan (Serbia)	3 – 2	(Azerbaijan) Neftchi Baku	Belgrade, Serbia
22:15 AZST (UTC+5)	Denis 29' (o.g.); Grbić 32'; Yunuszade 69' (o.g.)	Report	Denis 11', 17'	Stadium: Partizan Stadium; Attendance: 10,177; Referee: Hüseyin Göçek (Turkey)

28 August 2014 Play-off round 2nd leg	Neftchi Baku (Azerbaijan)	1 – 2 (3 – 5 agg.)	(Serbia) Partizan	Baku, Azerbaijan
21:00 AZST (UTC+5)	Wobay 58' (yellow card) 70'; Nfor (yellow card) 45+1' (yellow-red card) 86'; Ramos (yellow card) 48' (red card) 90+3'; Cauê (red card) 90+4'	Report	Škuletić 24', 90+2' (red card) 90+4'; Vulićević (yellow card) 62'	Stadium: Bakcell Arena; Attendance: 22,350; Referee: Robert Schörgenhofer (Austria)

== Squad statistics ==
As of Match played 3 June 2015

=== Appearances and goals ===
No.	Pos	Nat	Player	Total		Premier League		Azerbaijan Cup		Europa League	
No.	Pos	Nat	Player	Apps	Goals	Apps	Goals	Apps	Goals	Apps	Goals
1	GK	(Azerbaijan) AZE	Agil Mammadov	17	0	13	0	4	0	0	0
2	DF	(Brazil) BRA	Carlos Cardoso	36	1	25+1	0	5	0	5	1
3	DF	(Brazil) BRA	Denis Silva	26	5	19	2	3+2	1	2	2
4	DF	(Azerbaijan) AZE	Rahil Mämmädov	7	0	4+1	0	1+1	0	0	0
5	DF	(Azerbaijan) AZE	Elvin Yunuszade	31	0	21	0	4	0	6	0
7	MF	(Azerbaijan) AZE	Araz Abdullayev	42	5	28+2	4	4+2	0	6	1
8	MF	(Azerbaijan) AZE	Elshan Abdullayev	12	1	5+6	1	1	0	0	0
9	FW	(Brazil) BRA	Flavinho	32	2	20+4	2	1+1	0	6	0
10	MF	(Sierra Leone) SLE	Julius Wobay	38	9	26+1	7	4+1	1	6	1
11	FW	(Chile) CHI	Nicolás Canales	35	14	20+8	11	4+1	3	0+2	0
12	GK	(Latvia) LAT	Pāvels Doroševs	1	0	0+1	0	0	0	0	0
15	MF	(Paraguay) PAR	Éric Ramos	40	1	24+5	1	4+1	0	6	0
16	MF	(Azerbaijan) AZE	Äziz Quliyev	18	0	12+2	0	3+1	0	0	0
17	MF	(Azerbaijan) AZE	Rahman Hajiyev	16	0	3+10	0	2+1	0	0	0
18	MF	(Brazil) BRA	Cauê	35	1	21+4	1	4	0	6	0
19	MF	(Azerbaijan) AZE	Mirhuseyn Seyidov	34	2	20+3	1	4+1	0	5+1	1
20	FW	(Azerbaijan) AZE	Fahmin Muradbayli	2	0	0+2	0	0	0	0	0
21	FW	(Azerbaijan) AZE	Samir Masimov	40	1	10+18	1	4+2	0	0+6	0
22	FW	(Azerbaijan) AZE	Rauf Aliyev	13	0	3+8	0	2	0	0	0
27	DF	(Azerbaijan) AZE	Magsad Isayev	28	0	24	0	2	0	1+1	0
28	MF	(Azerbaijan) AZE	Emin Mehdiyev	18	0	10+3	0	4+1	0	0	0
29	FW	(Azerbaijan) AZE	Javid Muxtarzade	1	0	0+1	0	0	0	0	0
30	GK	(Serbia) SRB	Saša Stamenković	20	0	11+1	0	2	0	6	0
49	FW	(Azerbaijan) AZE	Mirabdulla Abbasov	2	0	0+2	0	0	0	0	0
90	FW	(Cameroon) CMR	Ernest Nfor	26	7	12+5	2	1+2	2	6	3
95	DF	(Azerbaijan) AZE	Elvin Badalov	9	0	6	0	2	0	0+1	0
Players away from Neftchi Baku on loan:
17	MF	(Azerbaijan) AZE	Nijat Gurbanov	4	0	1+2	0	1	0	0	0
23	FW	(Azerbaijan) AZE	Ruslan Qurbanov	16	4	7+5	3	0+1	1	0+3	0
25	MF	(Azerbaijan) AZE	Javid Imamverdiyev	4	0	1	0	0	0	0+3	0
Players who appeared for Neftchi Baku no longer at the club:
1	GK	(Azerbaijan) AZE	Emil Balayev	9	0	9	0	0	0	0	0
14	DF	(Azerbaijan) AZE	Elnur Allahverdiyev	6	0	6	0	0	0	0	0
16	DF	(Brazil) BRA	Bruno Bertucci	9	0	2+1	0	0	0	5+1	0

=== Goal scorers ===
Place	Position	Nation	Number	Name	Premier League	Azerbaijan Cup	Europa League	Total
1	FW	(Chile)	11	Nicolás Canales	11	3	0	14
2	MF	(Sierra Leone)	10	Julius Wobay	7	1	1	9
3	FW	(Cameroon)	90	Ernest Nfor	2	2	3	7
4	MF	(Azerbaijan)	7	Araz Abdullayev	4	0	1	5
4	DF	(Brazil)	3	Denis Silva	2	1	2	5
6	FW	(Brazil)	9	Flavinho	2	0	0	2
6	FW	(Azerbaijan)	21	Samir Masimov	2	0	0	2
6	FW	(Azerbaijan)	23	Ruslan Qurbanov	1	1	0	2
6	MF	(Azerbaijan)	19	Mirhuseyn Seyidov	1	0	1	2
10	MF	(Brazil)	18	Cauê	1	0	0	1
10	MF	(Paraguay)	15	Éric Ramos	1	0	0	1
10	MF	(Azerbaijan)	8	Elshan Abdullayev	1	0	0	1
10	DF	(Brazil)	2	Carlos Cardoso	0	0	1	1
10				Own goal	1	0	0	1
				TOTALS	38	8	9	55

=== Disciplinary record ===
Number	Nation	Position	Name	Premier League		Azerbaijan Cup		Europa League		Total	
Number	Nation	Position	Name	Yellow card	Red card	Yellow card	Red card	Yellow card	Red card	Yellow card	Red card
1	(Azerbaijan)	GK	Emil Balayev	1	1	0	0	0	0	1	1
1	(Azerbaijan)	GK	Agil Mammadov	3	0	0	0	0	0	3	0
2	(Brazil)	DF	Carlos Cardoso	11	2	1	0	3	0	15	2
3	(Brazil)	DF	Denis Silva	3	0	0	0	0	0	0	
5	(Azerbaijan)	DF	Elvin Yunuszade	9	0	2	0	1	0	12	0
7	(Azerbaijan)	MF	Araz Abdullayev	3	0	1	0	0	0	4	0
8	(Azerbaijan)	MF	Elshan Abdullayev	1	0	0	0	0	0	1	0
9	(Brazil)	FW	Flavinho	8	0	1	0	2	0	11	0
10	(Sierra Leone)	MF	Julius Wobay	3	0	0	0	1	0	4	0
11	(Chile)	FW	Nicolás Canales	3	1	0	0	0	0	3	1
12	(Latvia)	GK	Pāvels Doroševs	1	0	0	0	0	0	1	0
14	(Azerbaijan)	DF	Elnur Allahverdiyev	5	1	0	0	0	0	5	1
15	(Paraguay)	MF	Éric Ramos	12	0	3	0	3	1	17	1
16	(Brazil)	DF	Bruno Bertucci	2	0	0	0	2	0	4	0
16	(Azerbaijan)	DF	Aziz Guliyev	5	1	1	0	2	0	8	1
17	(Azerbaijan)	MF	Nijat Gurbanov	2	0	0	0	0	0	2	0
18	(Brazil)	MF	Cauê	4	0	1	0	1	1	6	1
19	(Azerbaijan)	MF	Mirhuseyn Seyidov	8	1	1	0	0	0	9	1
21	(Azerbaijan)	FW	Samir Masimov	0	0	1	0	1	0	2	0
22	(Azerbaijan)	FW	Rauf Aliyev	1	0	1	0	0	0	2	0
27	(Azerbaijan)	DF	Magsad Isayev	6	0	1	0	0	0	7	0
28	(Azerbaijan)	MF	Emin Mehdiyev	6	0	1	0	0	0	7	0
30	(Serbia)	GK	Saša Stamenković	2	1	0	0	0	0	2	1
90	(Cameroon)	FW	Ernest Nfor	4	0	0	0	2	1	6	1
95	(Azerbaijan)	DF	Elvin Badalov	3	0	0	0	0	0	3	0
			TOTALS	105	8	15	0	16	3	136	11

== Notes ==
- Qarabağ have played their home games at the Tofiq Bahramov Stadium since 1993 due to the ongoing situation in Quzanlı.
- Araz-Naxçıvan were excluded from the Azerbaijan Premier League on 17 November 2014, with all their results being annulled.
