= Santa Rosa de Viterbo =

Santa Rosa de Viterbo may refer to:

- Santa Rosa de Viterbo, Boyacá: a municipality and town in Boyacá, Colombia
- Santa Rosa de Viterbo, São Paulo: a municipality in São Paulo, Brazil
- Santa Rosa de Viterbo: a church in Santiago de Querétaro, Querétaro, Mexico
