= Cardoso (footballer, born 1984) =

Brazilian footballer

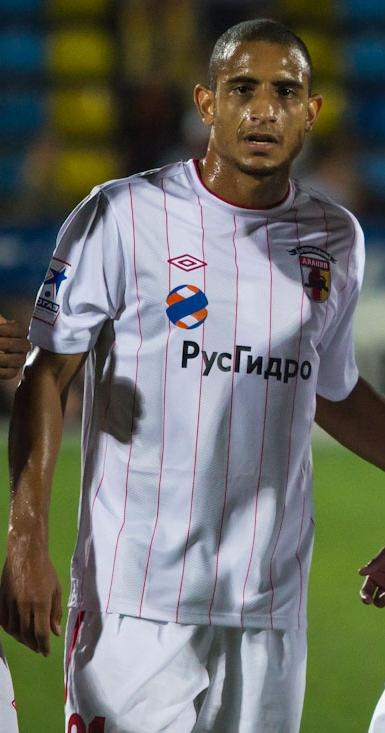
- With Alania in 2012

Personal information
- Full name: Carlos Alexandre Cardoso
- Date of birth: September 11, 1984 (age 42)
- Place of birth: Santa Rosa de Viterbo, Brazil
- Height: 1.90 m (6 ft 3 in)
- Position: Centre back

Youth career
- 2003–2005: Comercial-SP

Senior career*
Years	Team	Apps	(Gls)
2005–2006	Comercial-SP		
2006–2008	Estrela Amadora	8	(1)
2008–2012	Pandurii Târgu Jiu	101	(7)
2012	Alania Vladikavkaz	8	(0)
2013	Vitória	0	(0)
2013–2015	Neftchi Baku	51	(4)
2015–2016	Tractor Sazi	27	(1)
2016–2017	América Mineiro	1	(0)
2017	Botafogo SP	3	(0)
Total		199	(13)
- * Club domestic league appearances and goals

Carlos Alexandre Cardoso (born 11 September 1984), simply known as Cardoso, is a Brazilian former footballer who played as a central defender.

Born in Santa Rosa de Viterbo, São Paulo, Cardoso began his career at Comercial where he spent three years until joining Estrela Amadora. In 2008, during the winter transfer window, he moved abroad for the first time in his career to join Pandurii Târgu Jiu in Romania. Following a short stint at Russian club Alania Vladikavkaz in 2012, Cardoso returned to Brazil joining Esporte Clube Vitória. Cardoso joined Neftchi Baku in 2013 on a free transfer. In 2015, at the age of 30, Cardoso signed a one-year to play for Tractor Sazi of Tabriz in the Persian Gulf League.

== Career ==
=== Neftchi Baku ===
Cardoso signed for Azerbaijan Premier League Champions Neftchi Baku in June 2013, making 68 appearances for them in all competitions before leaving in June 2015.

=== Tractor Sazi ===
On 13 July 2015 Cardoso signed a one–year contract with Persian Gulf Pro League club Tractor Sazi.

== Career statistics ==
As of 20 March 2021

Club performance			League		Cup		Continental		Other		Total	
Season	Club	League	Apps	Goals	Apps	Goals	Apps	Goals	Apps	Goals	Apps	Goals
2007–08	Estrela Amadora	Primeira Liga	8	1	1	0	-		2 (Note: Two appearances and one goal in Taça da Liga)	1	11	2
2007–08	Pandurii Târgu Jiu	Liga I	8	0	1	0	-		-		9	0
2008–09	Pandurii Târgu Jiu	Liga I	25	0	3	0	-		-		28	0
2009–10	Pandurii Târgu Jiu	Liga I	29	2	0	0	-		-		29	2
2010–11	Pandurii Târgu Jiu	Liga I	15	0	2	2	-		-		17	2
2011–12	Pandurii Târgu Jiu	Liga I	24	5	2	0	-		-		26	5
2012–13	Alania Vladikavkaz	RPL	8	0	0	0	-		-		8	0
2013–14	Neftchi Baku	APL	25	4	5	0	1	0	1 (Note: One appearance and one goal in the Azerbaijan Supercup)	1	32	5
2014–15	Neftchi Baku	APL	26	0	5	0	5	1	0	0	36	1
2015–16	Tractor Sazi	Persian Gulf Pro League	27	1	0	0	7	0	-		34	1
2016	América Mineiro	Série A	1	0	0	0	-		-		1	0
2017	Botafogo SP	Série B	3	0	0	0	-		-		3	0
Total			199	13	19	2	13	1	3	2	234	18

== Honours ==
Vitória

- Campeonato Baiano: 2013

Neftchi Baku

- Azerbaijan Cup: 2013–14
