= Mirhüseyn Seyidov =

Azerbaijani footballer (born 1992)

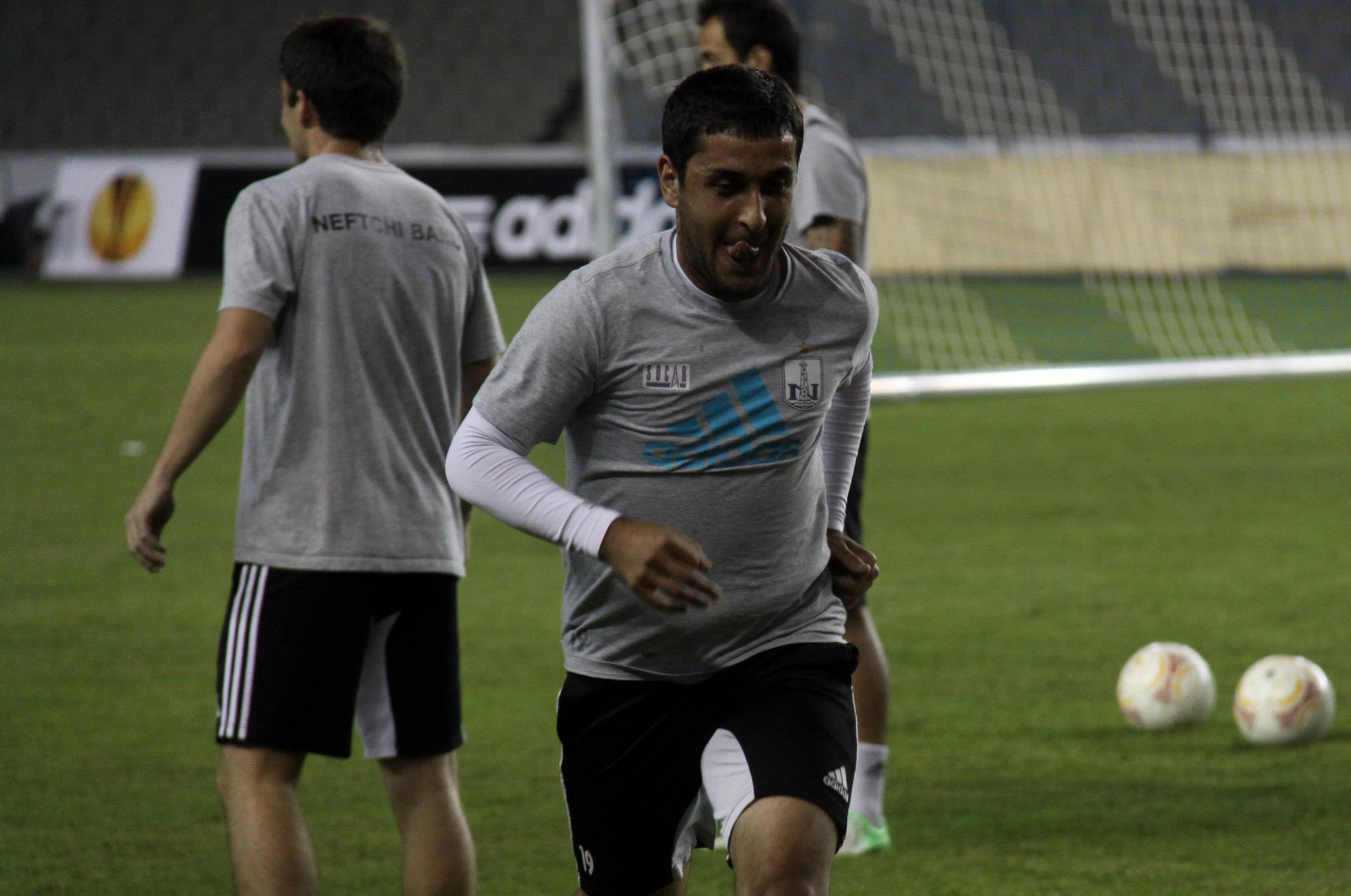

Personal information
- Full name: Mirhüseyn Mirhüseyn oğlu Seyidov
- Date of birth: 10 August 1992 (age 34)
- Place of birth: Sharur, Nakhchivan, Azerbaijan
- Height: 1.78 m (5 ft 10 in)
- Position: Midfielder

Youth career
- 2007: Inter Baku
- 2007–2009: Neftchi Baku

Senior career*
Years	Team	Apps	(Gls)
2009–2015	Neftchi Baku	116	(5)
2015–2017	Keshla	33	(0)

International career^{‡}
2007–2009	Azerbaijan U17	9	(0)
2009–2011	Azerbaijan U19	11	(2)
2011–2014	Azerbaijan U21	17	(1)
- * Club domestic league appearances and goals as of 30 November 2017 ‡ National team caps and goals as of 22 August 2014

Mirhüseyn Seyidov (Azerbaijani: Mirhüseyn Səyidov; born 10 August 1992) is an Azerbaijani footballer who plays as a midfielder.

== Club career ==
=== Neftchi Baku ===
Seyidov started his football career in his early years in Sharur where he was born and raised. He came to Baku when he was 15 years old. In 2007, after 6-month training in youth squad of Inter Baku Seyidov was invited to Neftchi Baku by prominent football coach Islam Kerimov.

Seyidov scored a long-distance goal in the away match against Slovenian FC Koper in the second qualification round of the 2014-15 UEFA Europa League which ended 0-2 for Neftchi Baku.

=== Keshla ===
On 30 November 2017, Keshla FK confirmed that they had terminated Seyidov's contract due to suspicion of manipulating matches. The following day, 1 December 2017, Seyidov was banned from all footballing activities by the AFFA.

== International career ==
Seyidov made his Azerbaijan under-17 debut in 2007 against Russia in UEFA European Under-17 Championship qualifiers. His European debut with Neftchi was in 2011 against Dinamo Zagreb in UEFA Champions League second qualifying round.

== Career statistics ==
=== Club ===
As of match played 25 November 2017

Appearances and goals by club, season and competition
Club	Season	League			National Cup		Continental		Other		Total	
Club	Season	Division	Apps	Goals	Apps	Goals	Apps	Goals	Apps	Goals	Apps	Goals
Neftchi Baku	2008–09	Azerbaijan Premier League	5	1			-		-		5	1
Neftchi Baku	2009–10	Azerbaijan Premier League	2	0			-		-		2	0
Neftchi Baku	2010–11	Azerbaijan Premier League	21	0	2	1	-		23	1		
Neftchi Baku	2011–12	Azerbaijan Premier League	24	1	3	0	1	0	-		28	1
Neftchi Baku	2012–13	Azerbaijan Premier League	19	1	3	0	11	0	-		33	1
Neftchi Baku	2013–14	Azerbaijan Premier League	25	1	3	0	0	0	-		28	1
Neftchi Baku	2014–15	Azerbaijan Premier League	18	1	3	0	6	1	-		27	2
Neftchi Baku	Total		114	5	14	1	18	1	-	-	146	7
Keshla	2015–16	Azerbaijan Premier League	16	0	2	0	5	0	-		23	0
Keshla	2016–17	Azerbaijan Premier League	6	0	2	0	-		-		8	0
Keshla	2017–18	Azerbaijan Premier League	11	0	0	0	4	1	-		15	1
Keshla	Total		33	0	4	0	9	1	-	-	46	1
Career total			147	5	18	1	27	2	-	-	192	8

== Honours ==
Neftchi Baku

- Azerbaijan Premier League: (3) 2010–11, 2011–12, 2012–13
- Azerbaijan Cup: (2) 2012–13, 2013–14
