= Elchin Rahmanov =

Azerbaijani footballer (born 1979)

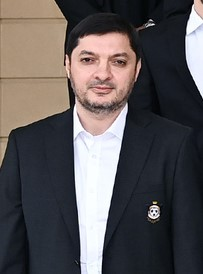

Personal information
- Full name: Elchin Alakber oglu Rahmanov
- Date of birth: 18 January 1979 (age 47)
- Place of birth: Baku, Soviet Union
- Height: 1.79 m (5 ft 10 1/2 in)
- Position: Midfielder

Team information
- Current team: Qarabağ (assistant)

Senior career*
Years	Team	Apps	(Gls)
1994–1995	Kür-Nur	5	(2)
1996–1997	Azerbaijan U-18	20	(8)
1997	Lelle SK	8	(0)
1998	Viljandi JK	7	(1)
1998–1999	Neftchi Baku	30	(3)
1999–2000	MOIK Baku	16	(3)
2000–2004	Shafa Baku	21	(6)
2004–2008	Neftchi Baku	48	(3)

International career^{‡}
1997–2004	Azerbaijan	7	(0)

Managerial career
- 2009–: Qarabağ (assistant)
- * Club domestic league appearances and goals as of 9 September 2017 ‡ National team caps and goals as of 9 September 2017

Elchin Rahmanov (Azerbaijani: Elçin Rəhmanov, born 18 January 1979 in Baku, Soviet Union) is a retired Azerbaijani footballer. He has made 7 appearances for the Azerbaijan national football team.
