= Santa Rosa de Viterbo, São Paulo =

Santa Rosa de Viterbo
- Municipality
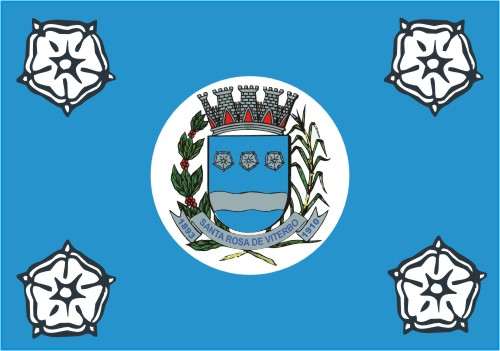
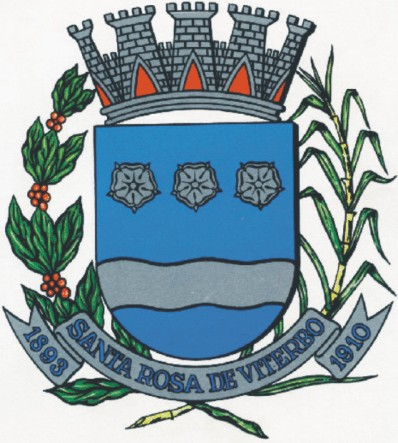
- Flag Coat of arms

- Location in São Paulo state

- Location in Brazil
- Coordinates: 21°28′22″S 47°21′47″W
- Country: Brazil
- Region: Southeast
- State: São Paulo

Area
  - Total: 289 km^{2} (112 sq mi)

Population (2020)
  - Total: 26,753
  - Density: 92.6/km^{2} (240/sq mi)
- Time zone: UTC−3 (BRT)

Santa Rosa de Viterbo is a municipality in the state of São Paulo in Brazil. The population is 26,753 (2020 est.) in an area of 289 km^{2} (112 sq mi). The elevation is 675 m.

== Media ==
In telecommunications, the city was served by Companhia Telefônica Brasileira until 1973, when it began to be served by Telecomunicações de São Paulo. In July 1998, this company was acquired by Telefónica, which adopted the Vivo brand in 2012.

The company is currently an operator of cell phones, fixed lines, internet (fiber optics/4G) and television (satellite and cable).

== See also ==
- List of municipalities in São Paulo
- Interior of São Paulo
