= Bakhtiyar Musayev =

Azerbaijani footballer (born 1973)

Bəxtiyar Musayev
Personal information
- Date of birth: 4 August 1973 (age 53)
- Height: 1.81 m (5 ft 11 1/2 in)
- Position: Midfielder

Senior career*
Years	Team	Apps	(Gls)
1990	MCOP-Termist Baku	7	(0)
1991	Dinamo Baku	19	(3)
1991–1995	Neftchi Baku	85	(9)
1991–1995	Turan Tovuz	1	(1)
1996	MOIK Baku	9	(1)
1996–1998	Qarabağ	38	(8)
1998–2003	Neftchi Baku	84	(19)
2003	Shamkir	8	(0)
2004	Shafa Baku	6	(0)
2004–2005	Khazar Lankaran	14	(4)
2005–2006	Neftchi Baku	6	(0)

International career
1997–2001	Azerbaijan	18	(0)
- * Club domestic league appearances and goals

Bəxtiyar Əlı oğlu Musayev (born 4 August 1973) is a retired Azerbaijani football midfielder.

He has played for Azerbaijan national team between 1997 and 2001, earning 18 caps.

== National team statistics ==
Azerbaijan national team
Year	Apps	Goals
1997	2	0
1998	1	0
1999	6	0
2000	8	0
2001	1	0
Total	18	0
