= Arif Asadov =

Azerbaijani footballer and coach (born 1970)

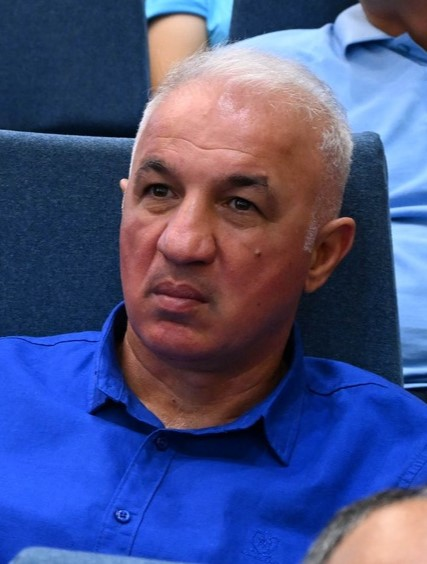

Personal information
- Full name: Arif Gyulaga oglu Asadov
- Date of birth: 18 August 1970 (age 56)
- Place of birth: Baku, Azerbaijan SSR
- Height: 1.77 m (5 ft 10 in)
- Position: Defender

Team information
- Current team: Azerbaijan (assistant coach)

Senior career*
Years	Team	Apps	(Gls)
1988–1993	Neftchi Baku	176	(4)
1994	Spartak Vladikavkaz	20	(1)
1995–1997	Neftchi Baku	48	(1)
1997–1998	Dinamo Baku	10	(0)
1998	Tyumen	25	(0)
1999	Anzhi Makhachkala	7	(0)
1999–2000	Qarabağ	18	(2)
2000–2002	Neftchi Baku	34	(0)
2003–2004	Qarabağ	23	(0)
2004	Khazar Lankaran	15	(0)
2005	Kapaz	4	(0)

International career
1993–2002	Azerbaijan	43	(0)

Managerial career
- 2010–2011: Neftchi Baku
- 2014–2015: Neftchi Baku
- 2017–2018: Sabah
- 2020–: Azerbaijan (assistant)
- 2024: Azerbaijan (caretaker)
- * Club domestic league appearances and goals

Arif Asadov (Azerbaijani: Arif Gülağa oğlu Əsədov; born 18 August 1970) is an Azerbaijani professional football coach and a former player. He is an assistant coach with the Azerbaijan national football team.

== Club career ==
He made his professional debut in the Soviet Top League in 1988 for Neftchi Baku.

== Coaching career ==
Asadov became the head coach of his former club Neftchi Baku in 2010, in which he achieved the 2010–11 Azerbaijan Premier League. In spring 2024, he became a caretaker manager of Azerbaijan.

== Honours ==
- Azerbaijan Premier League champion: 1992, 1996.
- Azerbaijan Premier League runner-up: 1997, 1998.
- Azerbaijan Premier League bronze: 1993, 1995.

== Statistics ==
Information correct as of 28 May 2015. Only competitive matches are counted.

Name	Nat.	From	To	P	W	D	L	GS	GA	%W	Honours
Neftchi Baku	Azerbaijan	2010	2011	35	20	11	4	60	23	57.14	League Champions
Neftchi Baku	Azerbaijan	2014	2015	30	11	10	9	38	34	36.67	

- Notes:

P – Total of played matches W – Won matches D – Drawn matches L – Lost matches GS – Goal scored GA – Goals against
%W – Percentage of matches won
