= 2013–14 Simurq PFC season =

Simurq
2013–14 season
- President: Anar Bakirov
- Manager: Giorgi Chikhradze
- Stadium: Zaqatala City Stadium
- Premier League: 7th
- Azerbaijan Cup: Second Round vs Araz
- Top goalscorer: League: Dragan Ćeran (13); All: Dragan Ćeran (13)
- Highest home attendance: 2,000 vs Qarabağ; 30 November 2013; AZAL; 14 December 2013
- Lowest home attendance: 150 vs Ravan Baku; 3 August 2013 vs Sumgayit; 15 September 2013
- Average home league attendance: 1,104; 3 April 2014
Home colours	Away colours

The Simurq 2013–14 season was Simurq's eighth Azerbaijan Premier League season. They finished 7th in the Premier League and reached the Second Round of the Azerbaijan Cup where they were defeated by Araz. It is Giorgi Chikhradze's second full season as manager.

== Squad ==
As of 4 February 2014

Note: Flags indicate national team as defined under FIFA eligibility rules; some limited exceptions apply. Players may hold more than one non-FIFA nationality.

No.	Pos.	Nation	Player
1	GK	POL	Paweł Kapsa
2	DF	AZE	Ilkin Qirtimov
3	DF	AZE	Nduka Usim
4	DF	BIH	Dilaver Zrnanović
5	DF	BRA	Anderson do Ó
6	MF	AZE	Tagim Novruzov
7	DF	AZE	Ruslan Poladov
8	MF	KEN	Patrick Osiako
9	MF	LTU	Mindaugas Kalonas (on loan from Baku)
10	MF	AZE	Rashad Eyyubov
11	FW	SRB	Dragan Ćeran
15	MF	CRO	Stjepan Poljak

No.	Pos.	Nation	Player
16	DF	AZE	Maharram Huseynov
17	DF	AZE	Rustam Mammadov
18	DF	AZE	Tural Akhundov
20	MF	ISR	Idan Weitzman
21	MF	AZE	Murad Sattarli
22	FW	MLI	Salif Ballo
26	MF	BEL	Benjamin Lambot
30	MF	ROU	Raul Costin
35	GK	AZE	Amil Agajanov
77	MF	AZE	Nijat Gurbanov (on loan from Neftchi Baku)
94	GK	AZE	Rashad Azizli (on loan from Neftchi Baku)

== Transfers ==
=== Summer ===
In: Note: Flags indicate national team as defined under FIFA eligibility rules; some limited exceptions apply. Players may hold more than one non-FIFA nationality.

No.	Pos.	Nation	Player
1	GK	POL	Paweł Kapsa (from (Cyprus) Olympiakos Nicosia)
6	MF	AZE	Tagim Novruzov (from (Azerbaijan) AZAL)
8	MF	KEN	Patrick Osiako (from (Israel) Hapoel Be'er Sheva)
9	FW	AZE	Rovshan Amiraslanov (from (Azerbaijan) Gabala)
11	FW	SRB	Dragan Ćeran (from (Israel) Maccabi Netanya)
16	DF	AZE	Maharram Huseynov (from (Azerbaijan) Kəpəz)
18	DF	AZE	Tural Akhundov (from (Azerbaijan) Ravan Baku)
19	MF	AZE	Orkhan Safiyaroglu (from (Azerbaijan) AZAL)
20	MF	ISR	Idan Weitzman (from (Israel) Bnei Sakhnin)
21	MF	AZE	Murad Sattarli (on loan from (Azerbaijan) Qarabağ)
22	FW	MLI	Salif Ballo (from (Azerbaijan) Turan Tovuz)
30	MF	ROU	Raul Costin (from (Romania) Vaslui)
35	GK	AZE	Amil Agajanov (to (Azerbaijan) AZAL)
77	MF	AZE	Nijat Gurbanov (on loan from Neftchi Baku)
94	GK	AZE	Rashad Azizli (loan from (Azerbaijan) Neftchi Baku)

Out: Note: Flags indicate national team as defined under FIFA eligibility rules; some limited exceptions apply. Players may hold more than one non-FIFA nationality.

No.	Pos.	Nation	Player
1	GK	AZE	Dmitriy Kramarenko (Retired)
3	DF	AZE	Rasim Ramaldanov (to (Azerbaijan) Khazar Lankaran)
5	DF	AZE	Rustam Abasov (loan return to (Azerbaijan) Inter Baku)
8	MF	AZE	Garib Ibrahimov (to (Azerbaijan) AZAL)
9	MF	POL	Marcin Burkhardt (to (Poland) Miedz Legnica)
10	FW	CRO	Zdravko Popović (to (Greece) AEK Athens)
12	FW	CRO	Tomislav Bušić (to (Croatia) Solin)
13	DF	AZE	Aleksandr Shemonayev (to (Azerbaijan) AZAL)
18	FW	AZE	Gafar Gafarov
19	MF	AZE	Nijat Gurbanov (loan return to (Azerbaijan) Neftchi Baku)
21	MF	AZE	Murad Sattarli (loan return to (Azerbaijan) Qarabağ)
22	GK	POL	Dawid Pietrzkiewicz (to (Azerbaijan) Gabala)
24	MF	AZE	Mehman Mammadov
25	MF	BIH	Mario Božić (to (Greece) Panachaiki)
27	FW	AZE	Bakhtiyar Soltanov (loan return to (Azerbaijan) Qarabağ)
99	GK	AZE	Eyyub Aliyev (loan return to (Azerbaijan) Neftchi Baku)

=== Winter ===
In: Note: Flags indicate national team as defined under FIFA eligibility rules; some limited exceptions apply. Players may hold more than one non-FIFA nationality.

No.	Pos.	Nation	Player
3	DF	AZE	Nduka Usim (from (Turkey) Tavşanlı Linyitspor)
9	MF	LTU	Mindaugas Kalonas (loan from (Azerbaijan) Baku)
21	MF	AZE	Murad Sattarli (from (Azerbaijan) Qarabağ)
26	MF	BEL	Benjamin Lambot (from (Belgium) Lierse)

Out: Note: Flags indicate national team as defined under FIFA eligibility rules; some limited exceptions apply. Players may hold more than one non-FIFA nationality.

No.	Pos.	Nation	Player
9	FW	AZE	Rovshan Amiraslanov
19	MF	AZE	Orkhan Safiyaroglu (to (Azerbaijan) AZAL)
28	MF	BIH	Nenad Kiso

== Competitions ==
=== Friendlies ===
1 July 2013	Simurq (Azerbaijan)	0 – 1	(Russia) Spartak Nalchik	Turkey
AZST (UTC+5)		Video	Goal

3 July 2013	Simurq (Azerbaijan)	3 – 3	(Georgia (country)) Dila Gori	Turkey
AZST (UTC+5)	Goal	Video	Goal

7 July 2013	Simurq (Azerbaijan)	1 – 1	(Georgia (country)) Dila Gori	Turkey
AZST (UTC+5)	Goal	Video	Goal

16 July 2013	Simurq (Azerbaijan)	1 – 2	(Greece) Olympiacos	Austria
AZST (UTC+5)	Zrnanović 47'	Video; Summary	Diamantakos 8'; Mitroglou 56'

24 July 2013	Simurq (Azerbaijan)	1 – 2	(Turkey) Beşiktaş	Austria
AZST (UTC+5)	Ballo 55'	Summary	Dentinho 68'; Almeida 85'

16 January 2014	Simurq (Azerbaijan)	1 – 0	(Germany) SSVg Velbert	Antalya, Turkey
AZST (UTC+4)	Ćeran 39'	[ summary]

20 January 2014	Simurq (Azerbaijan)	2 – 2	(Tanzania) Young Africans	Antalya, Turkey
AZST (UTC+4)	Anderson do Ó 44'; Sattarly 49'	[ Video]	Goal

22 January 2014	Simurq (Azerbaijan)	0 – 0	(China) Shanghai Shenxin	Antalya, Turkey
AZST (UTC+4)		Summary

25 January 2014	Simurq	–	Antalya, Turkey
AZST (UTC+4)		[ Video]

=== Azerbaijan Premier League ===
==== Results summary ====
Overall								Home						Away					
Pld	W	D	L	GF	GA	GD	Pts	W	D	L	GF	GA	GD	W	D	L	GF	GA	GD
36	11	13	12	33	29	+4	46	6	6	6	16	12	+4	5	7	6	17	17	0

Last updated: 18 May 2014.
Source: Soccerway

==== Results by round ====
Round	1	2	3	4	5	6	7	8	9	10	11	12	13	14	15	16	17	18	19	20	21	22	23	24	25	26	27	28	29	30	31	32	33	34	35	36
Ground	H	A	A	H	A	H	A	H	A	H	H	A	A	A	H	A	H	A	A	H	H	H	A	H	A	H	A	A	H	A	H	A	H	A	H	H
Result	W	D	L	L	W	W	D	D	D	L	D	L	D	W	D	L	W	W	L	L	L	W	D	D	W	W	W	L	L	D	W	L	D	L	D	D
Position	2	4	5	6	5	5	5	6	6	7	6	7	7	6	6	7	6	6	6	6	7	7	7	7	6	6	6	6	6	6	6	6	6	7	7	7

Source: Soccerway
A = Away; H = Home; W = Win; D = Draw; L = Loss

==== Results ====
3 August 2013 1	Simurq	2 – 0	Ravan Baku	Qabala
18:30 AZST (UTC+5)	Poljak 64'; Safiyaroglu 88'	Summary		Stadium: Gabala City Stadium; Attendance: 150; Referee: Orkhan Mämmädov

11 August 2013 2	Khazar Lankaran	0 – 0	Simurq	Lankaran
20:00 AZST (UTC+5)		Summary		Stadium: Lankaran City Stadium; Attendance: 7,000; Referee: Fariz Yusifov

17 August 2013 3	Neftchi Baku	1 – 0	Simurq	Baku
21:00 AZST (UTC+5)	Ramos 35'; Yunuszade (red card) 42'	Summary		Stadium: Bakcell Arena; Attendance: 800; Referee: Aliyar Ağayev

24 August 2013 4	Simurq	0 – 3	Baku	Baku
19:00 AZST (UTC+5)		Summary	Huseynov 48', 90+2'; Ismayilov 60'	Stadium: Shafa Stadium; Attendance: 1,000; Referee: Ramil Diniyev

1 September 2013 5	Inter Baku	1 – 2	Simurq	Baku
20:00 AZST (UTC+5)	I.Alakbarov 31'	Summary	Ćeran 78'; Costin 89'	Stadium: Shafa Stadium; Attendance: 600; Referee: Aliyar Ağayev

15 September 2013 6	Simurq	3 – 1	Sumgayit	Qabala
17:00 AZST (UTC+5)	Poljak 22', 42'; Ćeran 37'	Summary	Abdullayev 90+2'	Stadium: Gabala City Stadium; Attendance: 150; Referee: Rahim Häsänov

21 September 2013 7	Qarabağ	0 – 0	Simurq	Baku
19:30 AZST (UTC+5)		Summary	Ćeran (red card) 90+3'	Stadium: Tofiq Bahramov Stadium^{1} Attendance: 350; Referee: Rauf Jabbarov

29 September 2013 8	Simurq	0 – 0	Gabala	Baku
18:00 AZST (UTC+5)	Qirtimov (red card) 36'	Summary		Stadium: Shafa Stadium; Attendance: 600; Referee: Fariz Yusifov

4 October 2013 9	AZAL	1 – 1	Simurq	Baku
18:00 AZST (UTC+5)	Ibrahimov 24'	Summary	Eyyubov 52' (pen.)	Stadium: AZAL Arean; Attendance: 1,000; Referee: Ramil Diniyev

19 October 2013 10	Simurq	1 – 2	Khazar Lankaran	Baku
17:00 AZST (UTC+5)	Gurbanov 7'; Weitzman (yellow card) 54' (yellow-red card) 79'	Summary	A.Ramazanov 53'; Scarlatache 64'	Stadium: Bayil Stadium; Attendance: 1,200; Referee: Rauf Jabbarov

27 October 2013 11	Simurq	0 – 0	Neftchi Baku	Baku
18:00 AZT (UTC+4)		Summary		Stadium: Shafa Stadium; Attendance: 450; Referee: Aliyar Ağayev

1 November 2013 12	Baku	3 – 2	Simurq	Baku
15:00 AZT (UTC+4)	Ismayilov 18' (pen.), 73' (pen.); Aliyev 78'	Summary	Osiako 42'; Gurbanov 83'	Stadium: Tofik Bakhramov Stadium; Referee: Ramil Diniyev

9 November 2013 13	Simurq	0 – 0	Inter Baku	Baku
18:00 AZST (UTC+5)		Summary		Stadium: Shafa Stadium; Attendance: 700; Referee: Orkhan Mämmädov

22 November 2013 14	Sumgayit	0 – 1	Simurq	Sumgayit
17:00 AZST (UTC+5)		Summary	Poljak 42'	Stadium: Mehdi Huseynzade Stadium; Attendance: 700; Referee: Vusal Äliyev

30 November 2013 15	Simurq	0 – 0	Qarabağ	Baku
17:00 AZT (UTC+4)		Summary		Stadium: Shafa Stadium; Attendance: 2,000; Referee: Aliyar Ağayev

8 December 2013 16	Gabala	2 – 1	Simurq	Qabala
14:00 AZT (UTC+4)	Subotić 52', 90+3'	Summary	Guluzade 64' (o.g.)	Stadium: Gabala City Stadium

14 December 2013 17	Simurq	3 – 0	AZAL	Zaqatala
17:00 AZT (UTC+4)	Ćeran 22'; Costin 45+1'; Poladov 90'	Summary		Stadium: Zaqatala City Stadium; Attendance: 2,000; Referee: Ramil Diniyev

20 December 2013 18	Ravan Baku	0 – 3	Simurq	Baku
16:00 AZT (UTC+4)	Balokog (red card) 59'	Summary	Ćeran 22'; Costin 39'; Poljak 45'	Stadium: Bayil Stadium; Attendance: 200; Referee: Rahim Häsänov

2 February 2014 19	Neftchi Baku	3 – 0	Simurq	Baku
14:30 AZT (UTC+4)	Nfor 59', 85'; Imamverdiyev 70'	Summary		Stadium: Bakcell Arena; Attendance: 200; Referee: Aliyar Ağayev

9 February 2014 20	Simurq	0 – 1	Baku	Baku
15:00 AZT (UTC+4)		Summary	R.Aliyev 18'	Stadium: Shafa Stadium; Attendance: 1,500; Referee: Orkhan Mämmädov

14 February 204 21	Simurq	0 – 1	Inter Baku	Zaqatala
15:00 AZT (UTC+4)		Summary	Madrigal 72'	Stadium: Zaqatala City Stadium; Attendance: 1,500; Referee: Omar Paşayev

19 February 2014 22	Simurq	4 – 0	Sumgayit	Baku
16:00 AZT (UTC+4)	Ćeran 15' (pen.), 51'; Weitzman 22'; Ballo 90+2'	Summary	Hüseynov (yellow card) 14' (yellow-red card) 32'	Stadium: Shafa Stadium; Attendance: 1,000; Referee: Alik Yunusov

23 February 2014 23	Qarabağ	0 – 0	Simurq	Baku
15:00 AZT (UTC+4)		Summary		Stadium: Tofiq Bahramov Stadium^{1} Attendance: 500; Referee: Fariz Yusifov

28 February 2014 24	Simurq	0 – 0	Gabala	Baku
15:00 AZT (UTC+4)		Summary		Stadium: Shafa Stadium; Attendance: 2,700; Referee: Aliyar Ağayev

8 March 2014 25	AZAL	0 – 2	Simurq	Baku
16:00 AZT (UTC+4)	Shemonayev (red card) 73'	Summary	Poljak 29'; Qirtimov (red card) 73'; Ćeran 87'	Stadium: AZAL Arena; Attendance: 400; Referee: Orkhan Mämmädov

16 March 2014 26	Simurq	2 – 0	Ravan Baku	Zaqatala
15:00 AZT (UTC+4)	Eyyubov 13'; Ćeran 31'	Summary		Stadium: Zaqatala City Stadium; Attendance: 500; Referee: Omar Paşayev

23 March 2014 27	Khazar Lankaran	1 – 3	Simurq	Lankaran
16:00 AZT (UTC+4)	Nildo 78'	Summary	Eyyubov 15'; Poljak 21'; Anderson do Ó 85'	Stadium: Lankaran City Stadium; Attendance: 6,000; Referee: Aliyar Ağayev

29 March 2014 28	Baku	2 – 1	Simurq	Baku
15:00 AZT (UTC+4)	N.Alasgarov 13'; Weitzman 22' (o.g.); V.Mustafayev (red card) 45+1'	Summary	Ćeran 81'	Stadium: Tofik Bakhramov Stadium; Attendance: 1,000; Referee: Omar Paşayev

6 April 2014 29	Simurq	0 – 1	Inter Baku	Zaqatala
16:00 AZST (UTC+5)		Summary	Tskhadadze 74'	Stadium: Zaqatala City Stadium; Attendance: 200; Referee: Vusal Äliyev

12 April 2014 30	Sumgayit	1 – 1	Simurq	Sumgayit
15:00 AZST (UTC+5)	Hajiyev 71'	Summary	Ćeran 68'	Stadium: Mehdi Huseynzade Stadium; Attendance: 3,000; Referee: Omar Paşayev

19 April 2014 31	Simurq	1 – 0	Qarabağ	Zaqatala
17:00 AZST (UTC+5)	Ćeran 37'	Summary		Stadium: Zaqatala City Stadium; Attendance: 1,400; Referee: Orkhan Mämmädov

27 April 2014 32	Gabala	1 – 0	Simurq	Qabala
16:00 AZST (UTC+5)	Dodô 57'	Summary		Stadium: Gabala City Stadium; Attendance: 2,000; Referee: Omar Paşayev

2 May 2014 33	Simurq	0 – 0	AZAL	Zaqatala
18:00 AZST (UTC+5)		Summary		Stadium: Zaqatala City Stadium; Attendance: 1,000; Referee: Rahim Häsänov

7 May 2014 34	Ravan Baku	1 – 0	Simurq	Baku
18:00 AZST (UTC+5)	Varea 28' (pen.)	Summary	Qirtimov (yellow card) 63' (yellow-red card) 73'	Stadium: Bayil Stadium; Attendance: 500; Referee: Omar Paşayev

12 May 2014 35	Simurq	2 – 2	Khazar Lankaran	Zaqatala
18:00 AZST (UTC+5)	Ćeran 36', 89' (pen.)	Summary	Elias 3' (pen.); Z.Benouahi 8'	Stadium: Zaqatala City Stadium; Attendance: 2,000; Referee: Elvin Äsgärov

17 May 2014 36	Simurq	0 – 0	Neftchi Baku	Zaqatala
17:00 AZST (UTC+5)		Summary	Yunuszade (red card) 45'; M.Seyidov (red card) 90+4'	Stadium: Zaqatala City Stadium; Attendance: 1,000; Referee: Fariz Yusifov

==== League table ====
Pos	Team	Pld	W	D	L	GF	GA	GD	Pts
5	Baku	36	16	9	11	53	43	+10	57
6	Khazar Lankaran	36	12	13	11	44	49	−5	49
7	Simurq	36	11	13	12	35	28	+7	46
8	AZAL	36	6	13	17	29	49	−20	31
9	Sumgayit	36	5	10	21	27	61	−34	25

Source: Azerbaijan Professional Football league
Rules for classification: 1) points; 2) goal difference; 3) number of goals scored.

=== Azerbaijan Cup ===
4 December 2013 Second Round	Araz	2 – 2 (a.e.t.) (4 – 2 p)	Simurq	Nakhchivan
14:00 AZT (UTC+4)	D.Janalidze 45' (pen.); Soltanov 88'	Summary	Eyyubov 14' (pen.), 80'; Akhundov (yellow card) 5' (yellow-red card) 90+3'	Stadium: Nakhchivan City Stadium; Attendance: 6,000; Referee: Orkhan Mämmädov

== Squad statistics ==
As of Match played 17 May 2014

=== Appearances and goals ===
No.	Pos	Nat	Player	Total		Premier League		Azerbaijan Cup	
No.	Pos	Nat	Player	Apps	Goals	Apps	Goals	Apps	Goals
1	DF	(Poland) POL	Paweł Kapsa	33	0	32+0	0	1+0	0
2	DF	(Azerbaijan) AZE	Ilkin Qirtimov	29	0	28+0	0	1+0	0
4	DF	(Bosnia and Herzegovina) BIH	Dilaver Zrnanović	21	0	19+1	0	1+0	0
5	DF	(Brazil) BRA	Anderson do Ó	33	1	31+1	1	0+1	0
6	MF	(Azerbaijan) AZE	Tagim Novruzov	11	0	5+5	0	1+0	0
7	DF	(Azerbaijan) AZE	Ruslan Poladov	31	1	25+6	1	0+0	0
8	MF	(Kenya) KEN	Patrick Osiako	25	1	19+6	1	0+0	0
9	MF	(Lithuania) LTU	Mindaugas Kalonas	5	0	2+3	0	0+0	0
10	MF	(Azerbaijan) AZE	Rashad Eyyubov	32	5	28+3	3	1+0	2
11	FW	(Serbia) SRB	Dragan Ćeran	32	13	27+4	13	1+0	0
15	MF	(Croatia) CRO	Stjepan Poljak	36	7	33+2	7	0+1	0
16	DF	(Azerbaijan) AZE	Maharram Huseynov	14	0	4+9	0	1+0	0
17	DF	(Azerbaijan) AZE	Rustam Mammadov	1	0	1+0	0	0+0	0
18	DF	(Azerbaijan) AZE	Tural Akhundov	33	0	32+0	0	1+0	0
20	MF	(Israel) ISR	Idan Weitzman	25	1	23+1	1	1+0	0
21	MF	(Azerbaijan) AZE	Murad Sattarli	14	0	6+8	0	0+0	0
22	FW	(Mali) MLI	Salif Ballo	26	1	10+15	1	1+0	0
26	MF	(Belgium) BEL	Benjamin Lambot	15	0	15+0	0	0+0	0
30	MF	(Romania) ROU	Raul Costin	30	3	16+14	3	0+0	0
35	GK	(Azerbaijan) AZE	Amil Agajanov	4	0	3+1	0	0+0	0
55	MF	(Azerbaijan) AZE	İlqar Hüseynov	1	0	0+1	0	0+0	0
77	MF	(Azerbaijan) AZE	Nijat Gurbanov	28	2	19+9	2	0+0	0
Players who appeared for Simurq no longer at the club:
9	FW	(Azerbaijan) AZE	Rovshan Amiraslanov	1	0	0+1	0	0+0	0
19	MF	(Azerbaijan) AZE	Orkhan Safiyaroglu	8	1	3+5	1	0+0	0
28	MF	(Bosnia and Herzegovina) BIH	Nenad Kiso	18	0	14+3	0	1+0	0

=== Goal scorers ===
Place	Position	Nation	Number	Name	Premier League	Azerbaijan Cup	Total
1	FW	(Serbia)	11	Dragan Ćeran	13	0	13
2	MF	(Croatia)	15	Stjepan Poljak	7	0	7
3	MF	(Azerbaijan)	10	Rashad Eyyubov	3	2	5
4	MF	(Romania)	30	Raul Costin	3	0	3
5	MF	(Azerbaijan)	77	Nijat Gurbanov	2	0	2
5	MF	(Azerbaijan)	18	Orkhan Safiyaroglu	1	0	1
5	MF	(Kenya)	8	Patrick Osiako	1	0	1
5	DF	(Azerbaijan)	7	Ruslan Poladov	1	0	1
5	MF	(Israel)	20	Idan Weitzman	1	0	1
5	FW	(Mali)	22	Salif Ballo	1	0	1
5	DF	(Brazil)	5	Anderson do Ó	1	0	1
5				Own goal	1	0	1
				TOTALS	32	2	34

=== Disciplinary record ===
Number	Nation	Position	Name	Premier League		Azerbaijan Cup		Total	
Number	Nation	Position	Name	Yellow card	Red card	Yellow card	Red card	Yellow card	Red card
1	(Poland)	GK	Paweł Kapsa	2	0	0	0	2	0
2	(Azerbaijan)	DF	Ilkin Qirtimov	9	3	0	0	9	3
4	(Bosnia and Herzegovina)	DF	Dilaver Zrnanović	4	0	0	0	4	0
5	(Brazil)	DF	Anderson do Ó	4	0	0	0	4	0
7	(Azerbaijan)	DF	Ruslan Poladov	6	0	0	0	6	0
8	(Kenya)	MF	Patrick Osiako	6	0	0	0	6	0
10	(Azerbaijan)	MF	Rashad Eyyubov	9	0	0	0	9	0
11	(Serbia)	FW	Dragan Ćeran	3	1	1	0	4	1
15	(Croatia)	MF	Stjepan Poljak	4	0	0	0	4	0
18	(Azerbaijan)	DF	Tural Akhundov	8	0	2	1	10	1
20	(Israel)	MF	Idan Weitzman	6	1	1	0	7	1
21	(Azerbaijan)	MF	Murad Sattarli	2	0	0	0	2	0
22	(Mali)	FW	Salif Ballo	6	0	0	0	6	0
26	(Belgium)	MF	Benjamin Lambot	4	0	0	0	4	0
30	(Romania)	MF	Raul Costin	3	0	0	0	3	0
77	(Azerbaijan)	MF	Nijat Gurbanov	7	0	0	0	7	0
			TOTALS	83	5	4	1	87	6
