= 2012–13 Simurq PFC season =

Simurq
2012–13 season
- Chairman: Anar Bakirov
- Manager: Giorgi Chikhradze
- Stadium: Zaqatala City Stadium
- Premier League: 4th
- Azerbaijan Cup: Quarterfinals vs Neftçi
- Top goalscorer: League: Mario Božić (6); All: Mario Božić (6)
- Highest home attendance: 3,500 vs Qarabağ; 29 September 2012; AZAL; 26 October 2012
- Lowest home attendance: 1,000 vs Gabala; 3 May 2013 vs Inter Baku; 14 May 2013
- Average home league attendance: 2,176
Home colours	Away colours

The 2012–13 season was Simurq PFK's seventh Azerbaijan Premier League season, and it is their first full season under manager Giorgi Chikhradze. They finished the season in 4th place and were knocked out of the Azerbaijan Cup in the quarter-finals by Neftçi PFK.

== Squad ==
As of 12 February 2013

Note: Flags indicate national team as defined under FIFA eligibility rules; some limited exceptions apply. Players may hold more than one non-FIFA nationality.

No.	Pos.	Nation	Player
1	GK	AZE	Dmitriy Kramarenko
2	DF	AZE	Ilkin Qirtimov
3	DF	AZE	Rasim Ramaldanov (captain)
4	DF	BIH	Dilaver Zrnanović
5	DF	AZE	Rustam Abasov (loan from Inter Baku)
6	DF	BRA	Anderson do Ó
7	DF	AZE	Ruslan Poladov
8	MF	AZE	Garib Ibrahimov
9	MF	POL	Marcin Burkhardt
10	FW	CRO	Zdravko Popović
12	FW	CRO	Tomislav Bušić
13	DF	AZE	Aleksandr Shemonayev

No.	Pos.	Nation	Player
15	MF	CRO	Stjepan Poljak
17	DF	AZE	Rustam Mammadov
18	FW	AZE	Gafar Gafarov
19	FW	AZE	Nijat Gurbanov (loan from Neftçi)
20	DF	AZE	Rashad Eyyubov
21	FW	AZE	Murad Sattarli (loan from Qarabağ)
22	GK	POL	Dawid Pietrzkiewicz
24	DF	AZE	Mehman Mammadov
25	MF	BIH	Mario Božić
27	FW	AZE	Bakhtiyar Soltanov (loan from Qarabağ)
28	MF	BIH	Nenad Kiso
99	GK	AZE	Eyyub Aliyev (loan from Neftçi)

== Transfers ==
=== Summer ===
In: Note: Flags indicate national team as defined under FIFA eligibility rules; some limited exceptions apply. Players may hold more than one non-FIFA nationality.

No.	Pos.	Nation	Player
1	GK	AZE	Dmitriy Kramarenko (on loan from (Azerbaijan) Inter Baku)
4	DF	BIH	Dilaver Zrnanović (from (Bosnia and Herzegovina) Sarajevo)
6	DF	BRA	Anderson do Ó (from (Romania) FC Vaslui)
9	MF	POL	Marcin Burkhardt (from (Poland) Jagiellonia Białystok)
10	FW	CRO	Zdravko Popović (from (Greece) Levadiakos)
14	MF	AZE	Asif Mirili (on loan from (Azerbaijan) Inter Baku)
15	MF	CRO	Stjepan Poljak (from (Croatia) Slaven Belupo)
21	FW	AZE	Murad Sattarli (on loan from (Azerbaijan) Qarabağ)
22	GK	POL	Dawid Pietrzkiewicz (from (Czech Republic) Baník Ostrava)
25	MF	BIH	Mario Božić (from (China) Shanghai Shenhua)
28	DF	AZE	Rustam Abbasov (From (Azerbaijan) Inter Baku)
79	FW	SRB	Nenad Stojanović (from (Montenegro) Rudar Pljevlja)

Out: Note: Flags indicate national team as defined under FIFA eligibility rules; some limited exceptions apply. Players may hold more than one non-FIFA nationality.

No.	Pos.	Nation	Player
11	FW	LTU	Robertas Poškus (to (Russia) Sibir Novosibirsk)
14	MF	LAT	Andrejs Rubins (Retired)
19	FW	MDA	Anatolie Doroş (to (Moldova) CSCA–Rapid Chişinău)
27	MF	AZE	Ramil Sayadov
29	MF	LAT	Igors Tarasovs (to (Latvia) Ventspils)
77	FW	BUL	Daniel Genov (loan return to (Azerbaijan) Inter Baku)
79	DF	LTU	Vidas Alunderis (to (Russia) Sibir Novosibirsk)

=== Winter ===
In: Note: Flags indicate national team as defined under FIFA eligibility rules; some limited exceptions apply. Players may hold more than one non-FIFA nationality.

No.	Pos.	Nation	Player
12	FW	CRO	Tomislav Bušić (from (Croatia) Slaven Belupo)
27	FW	AZE	Bakhtiyar Soltanov (from (Azerbaijan) Qarabağ)
28	MF	BIH	Nenad Kiso (from (Hungary) Debreceni)

Out: Note: Flags indicate national team as defined under FIFA eligibility rules; some limited exceptions apply. Players may hold more than one non-FIFA nationality.

No.	Pos.	Nation	Player
79	FW	SRB	Nenad Stojanović (to (Montenegro) Rudar Pljevlja)

== Competitions ==
=== Friendlies ===
25 January 2013	Tom Tomsk (Russia)	1 – 1	(Azerbaijan) Simurq	Turkey
		Summary

=== Azerbaijan Premier League ===
==== Results ====
4 August 2012 1	Simurq	1 – 1	Gabala	Zaqatala
19:00 AZST (UTC+5)	Qirtimov 66'	Summary	Kelhar 15'; Abbasov (yellow card) 31' (yellow-red card) 84'	Stadium: Zaqatala City Stadium; Attendance: 1,500; Referee: Elchin Mammadov

10 August 2012 2	Baku	0 – 0	Simurq	Baku
19:00 AZST (UTC+5)		Summary		Stadium: Tofig Bakhramov Stadium; Attendance: 600; Referee: Rauf Jabbarov

18 August 2012 3	Simurq	3 – 0	Turan Tovuz	Zaqatala
19:00 AZST (UTC+5)	Popović 75', 82'; Božić 90+2'	Summary		Stadium: Zaqatala City Stadium; Attendance: 3,000; Referee: Orkhan Mammadov

24 August 2012 4	Khazar Lankaran	Postponed	Simurq	Lankaran
AZST (UTC+5)		Summary		Stadium: Lankaran City Stadium

15 September 2012 5	Ravan Baku	0 – 2	Simurq	Baku
AZST (UTC+5)		Summary	Božić 70'; Burkhardt 76'	Stadium: Bayil Stadium; Attendance: 1,000; Referee: Anar Salmanov

20 September 2012 4	Khazar Lankaran	0 – 2	Simurq	Lankaran
17:00 AZST (UTC+5)		Summary	Burkhardt 17'; Poljak 49'	Stadium: Lankaran City Stadium; Attendance: 1,000; Referee: Elchin Mämmädov

24 September 2012 6	Simurq	2 – 1	Kəpəz	Zaqatala
18:00 AZST (UTC+5)	Poljak 25'; Burkhardt 85'	Summary	Karimov 20'; Imamaliev (yellow card) 6' (yellow-red card) 89'	Stadium: Zaqatala City Stadium; Attendance: 2,000; Referee: Orkhan Mammadov

29 September 2012 7	Simurq	0 – 0	Qarabağ	Zaqatala
18:00 AZST (UTC+5)		Summary		Stadium: Zaqatala City Stadium; Attendance: 3,500; Referee: Aliyar Agayev

4 October 2012 8	Simurq	1 – 0	Sumgayit	Zaqatala
18:00 AZST (UTC+5)	Božić 63'	Summary		Stadium: Zaqatala City Stadium; Attendance: 2,200; Referee: Rauf Jabbarov

20 October 2012 9	Inter Baku	1 – 0	Simurq	Baku
18:00 AZST (UTC+5)	Tskhadadze 52'	Summary		Stadium: Dalga Arena; Attendance: 200; Referee: Anar Salmanov

26 October 2012 10	Simurq	1 – 1	AZAL	Zaqatala
18:00 AZST (UTC+5)	Sattarli 90+4'	Summary	R.Tagizade 29'	Stadium: Zaqatala City Stadium; Attendance: 3,500; Referee: Orkhan Mämmädov

30 October 2012 11	Neftçi	2 – 1	Simurq	Baku
16:00 AZST (UTC+5)	Canales 8' (pen.), 34'	Summary	Poladov 48'	Stadium: Ismat Gayibov Stadium; Attendance: 1,000; Referee: Elchin Mämmädov

4 November 2012 12	Turan Tovuz	1 – 1	Simurq	Tovuz
14:00 AZT (UTC+4)	Guliyev 79'	Summary	Poljak 35'; Ramaldanov (red card) 63'; G.Ibrahimov (red card) 80'; Qirtimov (yellow card) 39' (red card) 87'	Stadium: Tovuz City Stadium; Attendance: 3,000; Referee: Anar Salmanov

18 November 2012 13	Qarabağ	2 – 1	Simurq	Baku^{1}
16:00 AZT (UTC+4)	Richard 23'; Süleymanov 35' (o.g.)	Summary	Božić 61' (pen.)	Stadium: Tofiq Bahramov Stadium; Attendance: 400; Referee: Vusal Äliyev

24 November 2012 14	Simurq	1 – 0	Inter Baku	Zaqatala
15:00 AZT (UTC+4)	Popović 53'	Summary		Stadium: Zaqatala City Stadium; Attendance: 1,200; Referee: Rauf Jabbarov

2 December 2012 15	Sumgayit	0 – 1	Simurq	Sumqayit
14:00 AZT (UTC+4)		Summary	Poljak 45'	Stadium: Mehdi Huseynzade Stadium; Attendance: 2,500; Referee: Elvin Äsgärov

10 December 2012 16	Simurq	2 – 2	Khazar Lankaran	Zaqatala
16:00 AZT (UTC+4)	Sattarli 15'; Burkhardt 67'	Summary	Abishov (red card) 48'; Abdullayev 73'; A.Shemonayev 90+4'	Stadium: Zaqatala City Stadium; Attendance: 2,000; Referee: Aliyar Ağayev

16 December 2012 17	Gabala	0 – 1	Simurq	Qabala
14:00 AZT (UTC+4)		Summary	Božić 77'; Pietrzkiewicz (yellow card) 90+3' (red card) 90+4'	Stadium: Gabala City Stadium; Attendance: 500; Referee: Vusal Äliyev

20 December 2012 18	Simurq	3 – 0^{2}	Ravan Baku	Zaqatala
15:00 AZT (UTC+4)	Popović 90+2'	Summary		Stadium: Zaqatala City Stadium; Attendance: 2,500; Referee: Elvin Äsgärov

9 February 2013 19	AZAL	1 – 1	Simurq	Baku
18:30 AZT (UTC+4)	Nildo 55'	Summary	Popović 2'; Ramaldanov (red card) 62'	Stadium: AZAL Arena; Attendance: 300; Referee: Anar Salmanov

17 February 2013 20	Simurq	0 – 2	Neftçi	Zaqatala
17:00 AZT (UTC+4)		Summary	Canales 30'; Sadiqov 43'	Stadium: Zaqatala City Stadium; Attendance: 3,000; Referee: Rahim Häsänov

22 February 2013 21	Simurq	0 – 0	Baku	Zaqatala
17:00 AZT (UTC+4)		Summary		Stadium: Zaqatala City Stadium; Attendance: 2,500; Referee: Anar Salmanov

3 March 2013 22	Kəpəz	1 – 1	Simurq	Ganja
15:00 AZT (UTC+4)	S.Karimov 11'	Summary	Božić 53'	Stadium: Ganja City Stadium; Attendance: 50; Referee: Anar Salmanov

==== League table ====
Pos	Team	Pld	W	D	L	GF	GA	GD	Pts	Qualification
2	Inter Baku	22	11	8	3	24	12	+12	41	Qualification for championship group
3	Qarabağ	22	10	9	3	30	19	+11	39	Qualification for championship group
4	Simurq	22	9	9	4	25	15	+10	36	Qualification for championship group
5	Gabala	22	9	5	8	26	27	−1	32	Qualification for championship group
6	Baku	22	6	12	4	24	15	+9	30	Qualification for championship group

Source: Association of Football Federations of Azerbaijan and Soccerway.com
Rules for classification: 1) points; 2) goal difference; 3) number of goals scored.

=== Azerbaijan Premier League Championship Group ===
==== Results summary ====
Overall								Home						Away					
Pld	W	D	L	GF	GA	GD	Pts	W	D	L	GF	GA	GD	W	D	L	GF	GA	GD
10	3	3	4	6	11	−5	12	3	0	2	3	2	+1	0	3	2	3	9	−6

Last updated: 20 May 2013.
Source: Soccerway

==== Results by round ====
Round	1	2	3	4	5	6	7	8	9	10
Ground	H	H	A	H	A	A	H	A	H	A
Result	W	L	D	L	L	L	W	D	W	D
Position	3	4	4	4	4	4	4	4	4	4

Updated to match(es) played on 20 May 2013. Source: Soccerway
A = Away; H = Home; W = Win; D = Draw; L = Loss

==== Results ====
12 March 2013 23	Simurq	1 – 0	Qarabağ	Zaqatala
17:00 AZT (UTC+4)	Eyyubov 31' (yellow card) 28' (yellow-red card) 81'	Summary		Stadium: Zaqatala City Stadium; Attendance: 2,500; Referee: Rahim Häsänov

30 March 2013 24	Simurq	0 – 1	Baku	Zaqatala
17:00 AZT (UTC+4)		Summary	Pena 77'	Stadium: Zaqatala City Stadium; Attendance: 1,500; Referee: Elchin Mämmädov

5 April 2013 25	Gabala	1 – 1	Simurq	Qabala
16:00 AZST (UTC+5)	Assis 54'	Summary	Bušić 90'	Stadium: Gabala City Stadium; Attendance: 550; Referee: Orkhan Mämmädov

13 April 2013 26	Simurq	0 – 1	Neftçi	Zaqatala
18:00 AZST (UTC+5)		Summary	Wobay 49'	Stadium: Zaqatala City Stadium; Attendance: 2,500; Referee: Fariz Yusifov

20 April 2013 27	Inter Baku	5 – 0	Simurq	Baku
19:00 AZST (UTC+5)	Fomenko 4', 44'; Genov 37', 67'; Mansurov 59'	Summary	Božić (yellow card) 26' (yellow-red card) 30'	Stadium: Shafa Stadium; Attendance: 500; Referee: Elchin Mämmädov

28 April 2013 28	Baku	2 – 1	Simurq	Baku
16:00 AZST (UTC+5)	Huseynov 9'; Aliyev 79'	Summary	Burkhardt 81'	Stadium: Tofig Bakhramov Stadium; Attendance: 800; Referee: Rahim Häsänov

3 May 2013 29	Simurq	2 – 0	Gabala	Zaqatala
18:00 AZST (UTC+5)	Gurbanov 54', 68'	Summary		Stadium: Zaqatala City Stadium; Attendance: 1,000; Referee: Vusal Aliyev

9 May 2013 30	Neftçi	1 – 1	Simurq	Baku
21:00 AZST (UTC+5)	Wobay 26'	Summary	Eyyubov 14'	Stadium: Bakcell Arena; Attendance: 2,000; Referee: Rauf Jabbarov

14 May 2013 31	Simurq	1 – 0	Inter Baku	Zaqatala
17:30 AZST (UTC+5)	Popović 39' (pen.); Gurbanov (red card) 54'	Summary	Levin (yellow card) 56' (yellow-red card) 74'	Stadium: Zaqatala City Stadium; Attendance: 1,000; Referee: Orkhan Mämmädov

19 May 2013 32	Qarabağ	0 – 0	Simurq	Baku^{1}
18:00 AZST (UTC+5)		Summary		Stadium: Tofiq Bahramov Stadium; Attendance: 300; Referee: Rahim Häsänov

==== Table ====
Pos	Team	Pld	W	D	L	GF	GA	GD	Pts	Qualification
2	Qarabağ	32	16	11	5	43	26	+17	59	Qualification for Europa League first qualifying round
3	Inter Baku	32	16	9	7	38	22	+16	57	Qualification for Europa League first qualifying round
4	Simurq	32	12	12	8	32	26	+6	48	
5	Baku	32	9	14	9	33	27	+6	41	
6	Gabala	32	10	8	14	32	40	−8	38	

Source: Soccerway.com
Rules for classification: 1) points; 2) goal difference; 3) number of goals scored.

=== Azerbaijan Cup ===
28 November 2012 Second Round	AZAL	0 – 1	Simurq	Baku
17:45 AZT (UTC+4)		Summary	Poladov 26'	Stadium: AZAL Arena; Attendance: 1,400; Referee: Vusal Äliyev

27 February 2013 Quarterfinals 1st Leg	Simurq	0 – 0	Neftçi	Zaqatala
17:00 AZT (UTC+4)		Summary	Imamverdiyev (red card) 90+3'	Stadium: Zaqatala City Stadium; Attendance: 2,600; Referee: Fariz Yusifov

7 March 2013 Quarterfinals 2nd Leg	Neftçi	1 – 0 (a.e.t.) (1 – 0 agg.)	Simurq	Baku
17:00 AZT (UTC+4)	Flavinho 120'	Summary	Božić (yellow card) 64' (yellow-red card) 72'	Stadium: Bakcell Arena; Attendance: 1,000; Referee: Aliyar Ağayev

== Squad statistics ==
As of 20 May 2013

=== Appearances and goals ===
No.	Pos	Nat	Player	Total		Premier League		Azerbaijan Cup	
No.	Pos	Nat	Player	Apps	Goals	Apps	Goals	Apps	Goals
1	GK	(Azerbaijan) AZE	Dmitriy Kramarenko	4	0	4+0	0	0+0	0
2	DF	(Azerbaijan) AZE	Ilkin Qirtimov	31	1	28+0	1	3+0	0
3	DF	(Azerbaijan) AZE	Rasim Ramaldanov	26	0	24+0	0	2+0	0
4	DF	(Bosnia and Herzegovina) BIH	Dilaver Zrnanović	31	0	27+1	0	3+0	0
5	DF	(Azerbaijan) AZE	Rustam Abasov	1	0	1+0	0	0+0	0
6	DF	(Brazil) BRA	Anderson do Ó	30	0	21+6	0	2+1	0
7	DF	(Azerbaijan) AZE	Ruslan Poladov	29	2	19+7	1	2+1	1
8	MF	(Azerbaijan) AZE	Garib Ibrahimov	23	0	16+6	0	0+1	0
9	MF	(Poland) POL	Marcin Burkhardt	24	5	17+7	5	0+0	0
10	FW	(Croatia) CRO	Zdravko Popović	31	6	23+5	6	3+0	0
12	FW	(Croatia) CRO	Tomislav Bušić	11	1	2+7	1	0+2	0
13	DF	(Azerbaijan) AZE	Aleksandr Shemonayev	32	0	29+0	0	3+0	0
14	MF	(Azerbaijan) AZE	Asif Mirili	14	0	8+5	0	1+0	0
15	MF	(Croatia) CRO	Stjepan Poljak	31	4	24+5	4	2+0	0
17	DF	(Azerbaijan) AZE	Rustam Mammadov	5	0	2+3	0	0+0	0
19	MF	(Azerbaijan) AZE	Nijat Gurbanov	18	2	7+11	2	0+0	0
20	FW	(Azerbaijan) AZE	Rashad Eyyubov	18	2	9+6	2	0+3	0
21	FW	(Azerbaijan) AZE	Murad Sattarli	33	2	19+11	2	3+0	0
22	GK	(Poland) POL	Dawid Pietrzkiewicz	31	0	28+0	0	3+0	0
24	DF	(Azerbaijan) AZE	Mehman Mammadov	1	0	1+0	0	0+0	0
25	MF	(Bosnia and Herzegovina) BIH	Mario Božić	28	6	24+1	6	3+0	0
27	FW	(Azerbaijan) AZE	Bakhtiyar Soltanov	5	0	3+1	0	1+0	0
28	MF	(Bosnia and Herzegovina) BIH	Nenad Kiso	12	0	9+1	0	2+0	0
34	DF	(Azerbaijan) AZE	Elchin Süleymanov	1	0	1+0	0	0+0	0
62	MF	(Azerbaijan) AZE	Javad Kazımov	1	0	0+1	0	0+0	0
Players who appeared for Simurq no longer at the club:
79	FW	(Serbia) SRB	Nenad Stojanović	13	0	7+6	0	0+0	0

=== Goal scorers ===
Place	Position	Nation	Number	Name	Premier League	Azerbaijan Cup	Total
1	MF	(Bosnia and Herzegovina)	25	Mario Božić	6	0	6
2	MF	(Poland)	9	Marcin Burkhardt	5	0	5
2	FW	(Croatia)	10	Zdravko Popović	5	0	5
4	MF	(Croatia)	15	Stjepan Poljak	4	0	4
5				Awarded Goals	3	0	3
6	FW	(Azerbaijan)	21	Murad Sattarli	2	0	2
6	MF	(Azerbaijan)	19	Nijat Gurbanov	2	0	2
6	DF	(Azerbaijan)	20	Rashad Eyyubov	2	0	2
6	DF	(Azerbaijan)	7	Ruslan Poladov	1	1	2
9	DF	(Azerbaijan)	2	Ilkin Qirtimov	1	0	1
9	FW	(Croatia)	12	Tomislav Bušić	1	0	1
				TOTALS	32	1	33

=== Disciplinary record ===
Number	Nation	Position	Name	Premier League		Azerbaijan Cup		Total	
Number	Nation	Position	Name	Yellow card	Red card	Yellow card	Red card	Yellow card	Red card
1	(Azerbaijan)	GK	Dmitriy Kramarenko	1	0	0	0	1	0
2	(Azerbaijan)	DF	Ilkin Qirtimov	8	1	0	0	8	1
3	(Azerbaijan)	DF	Rasim Ramaldanov	11	2	1	0	12	2
4	(Bosnia and Herzegovina)	DF	Dilaver Zrnanović	9	0	0	0	9	0
6	(Brazil)	DF	Anderson do Ó	3	0	0	0	3	0
7	(Azerbaijan)	DF	Ruslan Poladov	2	0	0	0	2	0
8	(Azerbaijan)	MF	Garib Ibrahimov	5	1	1	0	6	1
10	(Croatia)	FW	Zdravko Popović	4	0	2	0	6	0
12	(Croatia)	FW	Tomislav Bušić	2	0	0	0	2	0
13	(Azerbaijan)	DF	Aleksandr Shemonayev	9	0	1	0	10	0
14	(Azerbaijan)	MF	Asif Mirili	5	0	0	0	5	0
15	(Croatia)	MF	Stjepan Poljak	1	0	0	0	1	0
19	(Azerbaijan)	MF	Nijat Gurbanov	2	1	0	0	2	1
20	(Azerbaijan)	DF	Rashad Eyyubov	5	1	0	0	5	1
21	(Azerbaijan)	FW	Murad Sattarli	4	0	0	0	4	0
22	(Poland)	GK	Dawid Pietrzkiewicz	5	1	0	0	5	1
25	(Bosnia and Herzegovina)	MF	Mario Božić	12	1	2	1	14	2
28	(Bosnia and Herzegovina)	MF	Nenad Kiso	4	0	1	0	5	0
79	(Serbia)	FW	Nenad Stojanović	1	0	0	0	1	0
			TOTALS	93	8	8	1	101	9
