= 2010–11 Simurq PFC season =

Simurq
2010–11 season
- Chairman: Zaur Mammadov
- Manager: Gjoko Hadžievski
- Stadium: Zaqatala City Stadium
- Premier League: 11th
- Azerbaijan Cup: Last 16 vs Absheron
- Top goalscorer: League: Bachana Tskhadadze (5); All: Bachana Tskhadadze (5)
Home colours	Away colours

The Simurq PFC 2010–11 season was Simurq's fifth Azerbaijan Premier League season, which they finished in 11th position. They were knocked out of the Azerbaijan Cup by Absheron at the Last 16 stage. It was their first, and only season with Gjoko Hadžievski as their manager.

== Squad ==
As of 18 of May 2011. Note: Flags indicate national team as defined under FIFA eligibility rules; some limited exceptions apply. Players may hold more than one non-FIFA nationality.

No.	Pos.	Nation	Player
1	GK	AZE	Fuad Ahmadov
2	DF	AZE	Sabuhi Hasanov (loan from Baku)
3	DF	AZE	Rasim Ramaldanov (captain)
4	DF	AZE	Emin Quliyev
5	DF	AZE	Elvin Yunuszade (loan from Neftchi Baku)
6	MF	AZE	Mikail Rahimov
7	FW	AZE	Samir Aliyev
8	MF	AZE	Garib Ibrahimov
9	FW	AZE	Ali Bagirov (loan from Inter Baku)
10	MF	AZE	Vasif Aliyev
11	MF	BRA	Mario Sergio (loan from Inter Baku)
12	GK	AZE	Tural Abbaszade
13	MF	AZE	Tabriz Mutallimov
14	DF	AZE	Anar Hasanli

No.	Pos.	Nation	Player
15	MF	AZE	Elvin Musazade (loan from Neftchi Baku)
16	FW	AZE	Samir Musayev
17	DF	AZE	Rustam Mammadov
19	MF	AZE	Ramin Nasibov
20	FW	AZE	Gafar Gafarov
21	MF	AZE	Nasib Aliev
22	GK	CRO	Adnan Hodžić
23	MF	AZE	Jamal Mammadov (loan from Inter Baku)
24	FW	AZE	Farid Guliev (loan from Neftchi Baku)
25	MF	AZE	Tofig Mikailov (loan from Inter Baku)
27	MF	AZE	Ramil Sayadov
28	DF	AZE	Ilkin Qirtimov
90	DF	BUL	Zhivko Zhelev (loan from Inter Baku)

== Transfers ==
=== Summer ===
In: Note: Flags indicate national team as defined under FIFA eligibility rules; some limited exceptions apply. Players may hold more than one non-FIFA nationality.

No.	Pos.	Nation	Player
2	DF	AZE	Sabuhi Hasanov (from (Azerbaijan) Baku)
5	DF	AZE	Elvin Yunuszade (loan from (Azerbaijan) Neftchi Baku)
9	FW	AZE	Ali Bagirov (loan from (Azerbaijan) Inter Baku)
13	DF	LTU	Paulius Paknys (loan from (Azerbaijan) Inter Baku)
15	DF	AZE	Elvin Musazade (loan from (Azerbaijan) Neftchi Baku)
23	MF	AZE	Jamal Mammadov (loan from (Azerbaijan) Inter Baku)
24	FW	AZE	Farid Guliev (loan from (Azerbaijan) Neftchi Baku)
25	FW	AZE	Tofig Mikayilov (loan from (Azerbaijan) Inter Baku)
28	FW	GEO	Bachana Tskhadadze (loan from (Azerbaijan) Inter Baku)

Out: Note: Flags indicate national team as defined under FIFA eligibility rules; some limited exceptions apply. Players may hold more than one non-FIFA nationality.

No.	Pos.	Nation	Player
1	GK	UKR	Taras Chopik
2	MF	GEO	Teymuraz Gongadze (to (Georgia (country)) Olimpi Rustavi)
8	MF	UKR	Ruslan Hunchak (to (Ukraine) Bukovyna Chernivtsi)
9	FW	AZE	Elshan Mammadov (to (Azerbaijan) Mughan)
15	MF	AZE	Tural Jalilov (to (Azerbaijan) Khazar Lankaran)
17	MF	GEO	Kakhaber Chkhetiani (to (Georgia (country)) Baia Zugdidi)
18	MF	GEO	Davit Bolkvadze (to (Georgia (country)) FC Olimpi Rustavi)
23	MF	GEO	Roman Akhalkatsi (to (Georgia (country)) FC Olimpi Rustavi)
32	FW	MDA	Alexandru Golban (to (Moldova) Milsami)

=== Winter ===
In: Note: Flags indicate national team as defined under FIFA eligibility rules; some limited exceptions apply. Players may hold more than one non-FIFA nationality.

No.	Pos.	Nation	Player
11	MF	BRA	Mario Sergio (loan from (Azerbaijan) Inter Baku)
—	DF	BUL	Zhivko Zhelev (loan from (Azerbaijan) Inter Baku)

Out: Note: Flags indicate national team as defined under FIFA eligibility rules; some limited exceptions apply. Players may hold more than one non-FIFA nationality.

No.	Pos.	Nation	Player
4	DF	AZE	Rashad Huseynov
11	FW	AZE	Yasin Abbasov (to (Azerbaijan) Turan Tovuz)
13	DF	LTU	Paulius Paknys (loan return to (Azerbaijan) Inter Baku)
16	MF	AZE	Nasib Äliyev
19	MF	AZE	Azer Säfärli (to (Azerbaijan) MOIK Baku)
20	MF	AZE	Elnur Abbasov
23	MF	AZE	Elchin Khälilov
28	FW	GEO	Bachana Tskhadadze (loan return to (Azerbaijan) Inter Baku)
32	GK	AZE	Zabid Safarov

== Competitions ==
=== Azerbaijan Premier League ===
==== First round ====
===== Results =====
7 August 2010 1	FK Ganja	1 - 1	Simurq	Ganja
18:00 AZST (UTC+5)	S.Allahquliyev 82'	Summary	Tskhadadze 71'	Stadium: Ganja City Stadium; Attendance: 5,000; Referee: Jeyhun Haşımov

15 August 2010 2	Simurq	0 - 2	Khazar Lankaran	Zaqatala
18:00 AZST (UTC+5)		Summary	Allahverdiyev 6' Ruíz 48'	Stadium: Zaqatala City Stadium; Attendance: 400; Referee: Rahim Hasanov

21 August 2010 3	Neftchi Baku	4 - 0	Simurq	Baku
21:00 AZST (UTC+5)	Nasimov 1', 44', 72'; Abdullayev 36'	Summary		Stadium: Tofik Bakhramov Stadium; Attendance: 1,000; Referee: Elnur Muradov

28 August 2010 4	Simurq	2 - 2	Turan Tovuz	Zaqatala
17:30 AZST (UTC+5)	Tskhadadze 56'; Abbasov 61'	Summary	G.Modebadze 51', 86'	Stadium: Zaqatala City Stadium; Attendance: 700; Referee: Jeyhun Haşımov

12 September 2010 5	AZAL	2 - 1	Simurq	Baku
18:30 AZST (UTC+5)	Juška 73' (pen.), 85'; Garayev (yellow card) 34' (yellow-red card) 75'	Summary	Rahimov 90'	Stadium: Shafa Stadium; Attendance: 300; Referee: Rahim Hasanov

19 September 2010 6	Simurq	1 - 1	Baku	Zaqatala
17:00 AZST (UTC+5)	Tskhadadze 34'	Summary	Sofroni 77'	Stadium: Zaqatala City Stadium; Attendance: 600; Referee: Afgan Hamzayev

25 September 2010 7	Mughan	1 - 0	Simurq	Salyan
17:10 AZST (UTC+5)	A.Gutierrez 17'	Summary	Ramaldanov (red card) 20'	Stadium: Salyan Olympic Sport Complex Stadium; Attendance: 500; Referee: Elchin Mämmädov

1 October 2010 8	Simurq	0 - 2	Gabala	Zaqatala
16:00 AZST (UTC+5)		Report; Summary	Yunisoğlu 14'; Cooke 85'	Stadium: Zaqatala City Stadium; Attendance: 700; Referee: Jeyhun Hashimov

17 October 2010 9	Qarabağ	3 - 2	Simurq	Baku
15:20 AZST (UTC+5)	Adamia 52'; Aliyev 77'; R.A.Sadigov 88'	Summary	Tskhadadze 46'; Mikayılov 73'	Stadium: Tofiq Bahramov Stadium^{1} Attendance: 100; Referee: Elvin Askerov

24 October 2010 10	MOIK Baku	0 - 2	Simurq	Baku
13:00 AZST (UTC+5)	D.Karimi (red card) 89'	Summary	M.Rähimov 22'; Tskhadadze 90' (pen.)	Stadium: MOIK Stadium; Attendance: 150; Referee: Aliyar Ağayev

31 October 2010 11	Simurq	0 - 1	Inter Baku	Zaqatala
14:00 AZT (UTC+4)		[Filip Despotovski Summary]	Despotovski 14'	Stadium: Zaqatala City Stadium; Attendance: 500; Referee: Ramil Diniyev

6 November 2010 12	Simurq	0 - 1	AZAL	Zaqatala
14:00 AZT (UTC+4)		Summary	Benouahi 28'	Stadium: Zaqatala City Stadium; Attendance: 155; Referee: Rauf Jabbarov

13 November 2010 13	Khazar Lankaran	1 - 0	Simurq	Lankaran
16:00 AZT (UTC+4)	Gurbanov 72'	Summary		Stadium: Lankaran City Stadium; Attendance: 7,500; Referee: Ramil Diniyev

20 November 2010 14	Simurq	0 - 0	FK Ganja	Zaqatala
14:00 AZST (UTC+5)		Summary		Stadium: Zaqatala City Stadium; Attendance: 600; Referee: Jeyhun Haşımov

27 November 2010 15	Gabala	4 - 0	Simurq	Qabala
14:00 AZT (UTC+4)	Burton 30' (pen.), 61' (pen.); Torres 55'; İsayev 90'	Report; Summary		Stadium: Gabala City Stadium; Attendance: 1,500; Referee: Anar Salmanov

5 December 2010 16	Baku	0 - 1	Simurq	Baku
16:00 AZT (UTC+4)		Summary	Aliyev 8'	Stadium: Tofik Bakhramov Stadium; Attendance: 500; Referee: Rahim Hasanov

11 December 2010 17	Simurq	0 - 1	Qarabağ	Zaqatala
14:00 AZT (UTC+4)		Summary	Hajiyev 77'	Stadium: Zaqatala City Stadium; Attendance: 600; Referee: Afgan Hamzayev

19 December 2010 18	Turan Tovuz	1 - 1	Simurq	Tovuz
14:00 AZST (UTC+5)	Erdoğdu 34'	Summary	Aliyev 49'	Stadium: Tovuz City Stadium; Attendance: 2,500; Referee: Ramil Diniyev

23 December 2010 19	Simurq	1 - 1	MOIK Baku	Zaqatala
14:00 AZST (UTC+4)	Aliyev 73'	Summary	O.Babayev 76'	Stadium: Zaqatala City Stadium; Attendance: 1,000; Referee: Elnut Muradov

13 February 2011 20	Inter Baku	2 - 0	Simurq	Baku
16:00 AZT (UTC+4)	Amiraslanov 25'; Accioly 69'	Summary		Stadium: Shafa Stadium; Attendance: 300; Referee: Rovshan Ahmadov

19 February 2011 21	Simurq	0 - 3	Neftchi Baku	Zaqatala
15:00 AZT (UTC+4)		Summary	Abdullayev 11'; Abishov 22'; Flavinho 53'	Stadium: Zaqatala City Stadium; Attendance: 1,000; Referee: Elchin Mämmädov

27 February 2011 22	Simurq	0 - 1	Mughan	Zaqatala
15:00 AZT (UTC+4)		Summary	Pelu 80'	Stadium: Zaqatala City Stadium; Attendance: 250; Referee: Elvin Äsgärov

===== League table =====
Pos	Team	Pld	W	D	L	GF	GA	GD	Pts	Qualification
8	Mughan	22	7	6	9	14	23	−9	27	Qualification for relegation group
9	Ganja	22	5	9	8	23	27	−4	24	Qualification for relegation group
10	Turan	22	3	6	13	17	35	−18	15	Qualification for relegation group
11	Simurq	22	2	6	14	12	34	−22	12	Qualification for relegation group
12	MOIK Baku	22	1	3	18	6	47	−41	6	Qualification for relegation group

Source: Soccerway.com
Rules for classification: 1) points; 2) goal difference; 3) number of goals scored.

==== Relegation group ====
===== Results =====
12 March 2011 23	Simurq	1 - 3	Mughan	Zaqatala
14:00 AZT (UTC+4)	Mario Sergio 57'	Summary	J.Mirzayev 45'; Akhundov 55'; G.Gulordava 90+4'	Stadium: Zaqatala City Stadium; Attendance: 500; Referee: Jeyhun Haşımov

18 March 2011 24	Ganja	0 - 1	Simurq	Ganja
14:00 AZT (UTC+4)	Sultanov (yellow card) 73' (yellow-red card) 87'	Summary	Mammadov 40' (o.g.)	Stadium: Ganja City Stadium; Attendance: 4,600; Referee: Elnur Muradov

3 April 2011 25	Simurq	0 - 1	Turan Tovuz	Zaqatala
15:00 AZST (UTC+5)		Summary	G.Beriashvili 8'	Stadium: Zaqatala City Stadium; Attendance: 250; Referee: Vusal Äliyev

9 April 2011 26	Simurq	1 - 2	MOIK Baku	Zaqatala
15:00 AZST (UTC+5)	Yunuszade 67'	Summary	A.Hasimov 44'; Isgandarov 61'	Stadium: Zaqatala City Stadium; Attendance: 400; Referee: Aliyar Ağayev

17 April 2011 27	Gabala	3 - 0	Simurq	Qabala
15:00 AZST (UTC+5)	Antić 34'; Baranin 55'; Torres 88'	Report; Summary		Stadium: Gabala City Stadium; Attendance: 500; Referee: Vusal Aliyev

23 April 2011 28	Mughan	3 - 0	Simurq	Salyan
14:00 AZST (UTC+5)	Pelu 45', 50'; Igor Souza 53'	Summary		Stadium: Salyan Olympic Sport Complex Stadium; Attendance: 300; Referee: Sabayel Gurbanova

29 April 2011 29	Simurq	0 - 0	Gabala	Zaqatala
16:00 AZST (UTC+5)		Report; Summary		Stadium: Zaqatala City Stadium; Attendance: 300; Referee: Jeyhun Hashimov

7 May 2011 30	MOIK Baku	1 - 0	Simurq	Baku
16:00 AZST (UTC+5)	Yusubov 45'	Summary	A.Bağırov (yellow card) 6' (yellow-red card) 29'	Stadium: MOIK Stadium; Attendance: 100; Referee: Teymur Färhadov

12 May 2011 31	Turan Tovuz	2 - 1	Simurq	Tovuz
16:00 AZST (UTC+5)	Hüseynov 4'; Erdoğdu 28'	Summary	Q.Qafarov 60'	Stadium: Tovuz City Stadium; Attendance: 1,000; Referee: Jeyhun Haşımov

19 May 2011 32	Simurq	4 - 3	Ganja	Zaqatala
16:00 AZST (UTC+5)	Bağırov 44', 66'; T.Mikayılov 51'; Yunuszade 65'	Summary	Abdulov 2'; E.Seyidov 22'	Stadium: Zaqatala City Stadium; Attendance: 350; Referee: Rauf Jabbarov

===== Table =====
Pos	Team	Pld	W	D	L	GF	GA	GD	Pts	Relegation
7	Gabala	32	13	12	7	31	18	+13	51	
8	Mughan	32	13	8	11	29	31	−2	47	
9	Ganja	32	8	12	12	33	37	−4	36	
10	Turan	32	7	6	19	24	47	−23	27	
11	Simurq (R)	32	4	7	21	20	52	−32	19	Relegation to Azerbaijan First Division
12	MOIK Baku (R)	32	4	6	22	14	55	−41	18	Relegation to Azerbaijan First Division

Source: Soccerway.com
Rules for classification: 1) points; 2) goal difference; 3) number of goals scored.
(R) Relegated

=== Azerbaijan Cup ===
8 December 2010 Last 16	Simurq	1 - 1 (a.e.t.) (1 – 4 p)	Absheron	Zaqatala
13:00 AZT (UTC+4)	V.Äliyev 40'	Summary	Z.Quliyev 40'	Stadium: Zaqatala City Stadium; Attendance: 500; Referee: Rasim Mämmädov

== Squad statistics ==
=== Appearances and goals ===
No.	Pos	Nat	Player	Total		Premier League		Azerbaijan Cup	
No.	Pos	Nat	Player	Apps	Goals	Apps	Goals	Apps	Goals
1	GK	(Azerbaijan) AZE	Fuad Ahmadov	5	0	5+0	0	0+0	0
2	DF	(Azerbaijan) AZE	Sabuhi Hasanov	9	0	8+1	0	0+0	0
3	DF	(Azerbaijan) AZE	Rasim Ramaldanov	20	0	19+1	0	0+0	0
4	MF	(Azerbaijan) AZE	Emin Quliyev	3	0	3+0	0	0+0	0
5	DF	(Azerbaijan) AZE	Elvin Yunuszade	32	2	31+0	2	1+0	0
6	MF	(Azerbaijan) AZE	Mikail Rahimov	25	2	25+0	2	0+0	0
7	FW	(Azerbaijan) AZE	Samir Aliyev	22	3	18+3	3	1+0	0
8	MF	(Azerbaijan) AZE	Garib Ibrahimov	30	0	24+5	0	1+0	0
9	FW	(Azerbaijan) AZE	Ali Bağırov	29	2	20+8	2	0+1	0
10	MF	(Azerbaijan) AZE	Vasif Aliyev	28	1	22+5	0	1+0	1
11	MF	(Brazil) BRA	Mario Sergio	3	1	3+0	1	0+0	0
14	DF	(Azerbaijan) AZE	Anar Hasanli	16	0	14+2	0	0+0	0
15	MF	(Azerbaijan) AZE	Elvin Musazade	22	0	14+7	0	1+0	0
16	FW	(Azerbaijan) AZE	Samir Musayev	8	0	5+3	0	0+0	0
17	DF	(Azerbaijan) AZE	Rustam Mammadov	29	0	26+2	0	1+0	0
18	DF	(Azerbaijan) AZE	Elnur Yusifov	3	0	1+2	0	0+0	0
19	MF	(Azerbaijan) AZE	Ramin Nasibov	6	0	3+3	0	0+0	0
20	FW	(Azerbaijan) AZE	Gafar Gafarov	6	1	1+5	1	0+0	0
22	GK	(Croatia) CRO	Adnan Hodžić	27	0	26+0	0	1+0	0
23	MF	(Azerbaijan) AZE	Jamal Mammadov	5	0	2+3	0	0+0	0
24	FW	(Azerbaijan) AZE	Farid Guliev	5	0	4+1	0	0+0	0
25	MF	(Azerbaijan) AZE	Tofig Mikailov	21	2	16+5	2	0+0	0
27	MF	(Azerbaijan) AZE	Ramil Sayadov	17	0	5+11	0	1+0	0
28	DF	(Azerbaijan) AZE	Ilkin Qirtimov	14	0	11+2	0	1+0	0
	DF	(Azerbaijan) AZE	Lachin Shakarov	1	0	0+1	0	0+0	0
	MF	(Azerbaijan) AZE	Dilgam Askerov	2	0	0+2	0	0+0	0
	DF	(Bulgaria) BUL	Zhivko Zhelev	2	0	2+0	0	0+0	0
Players who appeared for Simurq who left during the season:
4	DF	(Azerbaijan) AZE	Rashad Huseynov	2	0	2+0	0	0+0	0
11	FW	(Azerbaijan) AZE	Yasin Abbasov	16	1	5+10	1	0+1	0
13	MF	(Lithuania) LTU	Paulius Paknys	10	0	9+1	0	0+0	0
16	MF	(Azerbaijan) AZE	Nasib Äliyev	1	0	0+1	0	0+0	0
19	MF	(Azerbaijan) AZE	Azer Säfärli	1	0	0+1	0	0+0	0
20	MF	(Azerbaijan) AZE	Elnur Abbasov	12	0	8+3	0	1+0	0
23	MF	(Azerbaijan) AZE	Elchin Khälilov	15	0	11+3	0	1+0	0
28	FW	(Georgia (country)) GEO	Bachana Tskhadadze	1	0	0+1	0	0+0	0
32	GK	(Azerbaijan) AZE	Zabid Safarov	1	0	1+0	0	0+0	0

=== Goal scorers ===
Place	Position	Nation	Number	Name	Premier League	Azerbaijan Cup	Total
1	FW	(Georgia (country))	28	Bachana Tskhadadze	5	0	5
2	FW	(Azerbaijan)	7	Samir Aliyev	3	0	3
3	FW	(Azerbaijan)	5	Elvin Yunuszade	2	0	2
3	MF	(Azerbaijan)	9	Ali Bağırov	2	0	2
3	MF	(Azerbaijan)	6	Mikayel Rahimov	2	0	2
3	MF	(Azerbaijan)	25	Tofig Mikayılov	2	0	2
7	FW	(Azerbaijan)	11	Yasin Abbasov	1	0	1
7	MF	(Azerbaijan)	20	Gafar Gafarov	1	0	1
7	MF	(Brazil)	11	Mario Sergio	1	0	1
7	FW	(Azerbaijan)	10	Vasif Äliyev	0	1	1
7				Own goal	1	0	1
				TOTALS	20	1	21

=== Disciplinary record ===
Number	Nation	Position	Name	Premier League		Azerbaijan Cup		Total	
Number	Nation	Position	Name	Yellow card	Red card	Yellow card	Red card	Yellow card	Red card
1	(Azerbaijan)	GK	Fuad Ahmadov	1	0	0	0	1	0
2	(Azerbaijan)	DF	Sabuhi Hasanov	2	0	0	0	2	0
3	(Azerbaijan)	DF	Rasim Ramaldanov	5	1	0	0	5	1
5	(Azerbaijan)	DF	Elvin Yunuszade	5	0	0	0	5	0
6	(Azerbaijan)	MF	Mikail Rahimov	5	0	0	0	5	0
8	(Azerbaijan)	MF	Garib Ibrahimov	4	0	0	0	4	0
9	(Azerbaijan)	FW	Ali Bağırov	3	1	0	0	3	1
10	(Azerbaijan)	MF	Vasif Aliyev	4	0	0	0	4	0
11	(Azerbaijan)	MF	Yasin Abbasov	2	0	0	0	2	0
13	(Azerbaijan)	MF	Paulius Paknys	3	0	0	0	3	0
14	(Azerbaijan)	DF	Anar Hasanli	4	0	0	0	4	0
17	(Azerbaijan)	DF	GRustam Mammadov	2	0	0	0	2	0
18	(Azerbaijan)	DF	Elnur Yusifov	1	0	0	0	1	0
20	(Azerbaijan)	MF	Elnur Abbasov	5	0	0	0	5	0
23	(Azerbaijan)	MF	Elchin Khälilov	3	0	0	0	3	0
25	(Azerbaijan)	MF	Tofig Mikailov	2	0	0	0	2	0
27	(Azerbaijan)	MF	Elnur Abbasov	5	0	0	0	5	0
28	(Azerbaijan)	DF	Ilkin Qirtimov	3	0	0	0	3	0
	(Azerbaijan)	DF	Lachin Shakarov	1	0	0	0	1	0
			TOTALS	60	2	0	0	60	2
