= Raul Costin =

Romanian footballer

Personal information
- Date of birth: 29 January 1985 (age 41)
- Place of birth: Moldova Nouă, Romania
- Height: 1.76 m (5 ft 9 in)
- Position: Central midfielder

Youth career
- –2004: Național București

Senior career*
Years	Team	Apps	(Gls)
2004–2008	Național București	24	(0)
2005–2006	→ Sibiu (loan)	16	(2)
2008–2009	Dacia Mioveni	32	(12)
2009–2013	Vaslui	101	(5)
2013–2014	Simurq	30	(3)
2014–2015	Universitatea Cluj	26	(1)
2015	Botoșani	11	(0)
2016	Rapid București	17	(1)
2016	ASA Târgu Mureș	3	(0)
2016–2017	Concordia Chiajna	34	(2)
2017–2019	Argeș Pitești	62	(8)
2019–2020	Mioveni	25	(5)
2020–2022	Rapid București	20	(0)
Total		401	(39)
- * Club domestic league appearances and goals

Raul Răzvan Costin (born 29 January 1985) is a Romanian former professional footballer who played as a central midfielder. He was best known for his simple distribution and long shots.

== Early career ==
Costin is a product of the Național București youth academy making his first-team debut during the 2006–07 season against CFR Cluj coming on as a substitute in a 1–0 loss. Before his Național debut, he has played one season loaned to FC Sibiu during the 2005–06 season. In the 2008 summer, because of Progresul's (former Național) disaffiliation, he signed for Dacia Mioveni where he managed 12 goals, in 32 matches, finishing 6th with his team.

=== FC Vaslui ===
On 18 July 2009, he signed a three-year contract with SC Vaslui for an undisclosed fee. He made his first-team debut on 12 August, against Gaz Metan Mediaș coming as a substitute in a 2–1 win and he scored his first goal against Poli Iași in the Moldavian Derby, also in a 2–1 win. He helped his team reaching the Romanian Cup final after scoring the first goal, in the 4–0 win against FC Brașov in the semi-finals. On 15 April 2012 he scored an amazing goal against CS Mioveni in a 3–0 victory.

=== Simurq ===
In August 2013, Costin signed for Azerbaijan Premier League side Simurq. Costin made his debut for Simurq in their second game of the season, away to Khazar Lankaran on 11 August 2013, coming on as a 63rd-minute substitute for Stjepan Poljak. Costin's first goal for Simurq was the winning goal in the 89th minute against Inter Baku on 1 September 2013.

=== Universitatea Cluj ===
After one season at Simurq, Costin moved to Universitatea Cluj in June 2014.

== Career statistics ==
Appearances and goals by club, season and competition
Club	Season	League		Cup		League Cup		Europe		Total	
Club	Season	Apps	Goals	Apps	Goals	Apps	Goals	Apps	Goals	Apps	Goals
Sibiu (loan)	2005–06	16	2	0	0	–		–		16	2
Național București	2006–07	13	0	2	0	–		–		15	0
Național București	2007–08	11	0	1	0	–		–		12	0
Național București	Total	24	0	3	0	0	0	0	0	27	0
Dacia Mioveni	2008–09	32	12	1	0	–		–		33	12
Vaslui	2009–10	24	2	5	2	–		1	0	30	4
Vaslui	2010–11	27	2	1	0	–		2	0	30	2
Vaslui	2011–12	27	1	4	1	–		7	0	38	2
Vaslui	2012–13	23	0	1	0	–		2	0	26	0
Vaslui	Total	101	5	11	3	0	0	12	0	124	8
Simurq	2013–14	30	3	0	0	–		–		30	3
Universitatea Cluj	2014–15	26	1	3	0	2	0	–		29	1
Botoșani	2015–16	11	0	2	0	1	0	4	0	18	0
Rapid București	2015–16	17	1	0	0	–		–		17	1
Târgu Mureș	2016–17	3	0	0	0	0	0	–		3	0
Concordia Chiajna	2016–17	32	2	0	0	0	0	–		32	2
Concordia Chiajna	2017–18	2	0	0	0	–		–		2	0
Concordia Chiajna	Total	34	2	0	0	0	0	0	0	34	2
Argeș Pitești	2017–18	30	7	1	0	–		–		31	7
Argeș Pitești	2018–19	32	1	0	0	–		–		32	1
Argeș Pitești	Total	62	8	1	0	0	0	0	0	63	8
Mioveni	2019–20	25	5	1	0	2	0	–		28	5
Rapid București	2020–21	20	0	1	0	–		–		21	0
Career total		401	39	23	3	5	0	16	0	445	42

== Honours ==
Rapid București

- Liga II: 2015–16
