= Patrick Osiako =

Kenyan footballer (born 1986)

Personal information
- Full name: Patrick Osiako
- Date of birth: 15 November 1986 (age 39)
- Place of birth: Mombasa, Kenya
- Height: 1.76 m (5 ft 9 1/2 in)
- Position: Midfielder

Team information
- Current team: Syrianska FF Enköping

Senior career*
Years	Team	Apps	(Gls)
2003–2004	Coast Stars	14	(0)
2005–2006	Tusker	15	(3)
2007–2011	Mjällby AIF	125	(6)
2012	Petrolul Ploieşti	11	(1)
2012–2013	Hapoel Be'er Sheva	28	(1)
2013–2015	Simurq	39	(1)
2016	FC Linköping City	21	(1)
2017	IFK Haninge	1	(0)
2017–2019	IFK Hässleholm	50	(1)
2020	Syrianska Eskilstuna IF	11	(3)
2021–	Syrianska FF Enköping		

International career^{‡}
2006–2013	Kenya	12	(0)
- * Club domestic league appearances and goals as of 7 June 2023 ‡ National team caps and goals as of 7 June 2023

Patrick Osiako (born 15 November 1986, in Mombasa) is retired a Kenyan footballer who turned out for Coast Stars and Tusker in Kenya, Mjällby AIF, FC Linköping City, IFK Haninge, IFK Hässleholm and Syrianska Eskilstuna IF in Sweden, Petrolul Ploieşti in Romania, Hapoel Be'er Sheva in Israel, and Simurq in Azerbaijan as a midfielder.

== Career ==
Osiako played for Coast Stars aged just 16 in the 2003–04 season before later crossing over to Tusker for a season and a half.

In December 2007, Osiako was signed by Superettan side Mjällby AIF on a two-and-a-half-year contract. His contract with Mjällby expired at the end of the 2009 season; however, he signed a new two-year contract with Mjällby shortly after.

Following Osiako's release from Mjällby trained with Sölvesborgs whilst exploring options in Russia before having a trial with Romanian side Petrolul Ploiești. In March 2012, following a successful trial, Osiako signed a two-month contract with Petrolul Ploiești. After the expiration of his contract Osiako considered a new contract from Petrolul Ploiești before signing for Hapoel Be'er Sheva.

In August 2013, Osiako signed for Azerbaijan Premier League side Simurq from Hapoel Be'er Sheva. When Osiako made his debut for Simurq on 3 August 2013, coming on as an 87th-minute substitute for Stjepan Poljak in their 2–0 victory over Ravan Baku, he became only the second Kenyan to play in the Azerbaijan Premier League after Allan Wanga. Osiako scored his first goal for Simurq on 1 November 2013, in their 3–2 away defeat to Baku.

== International career ==
Osiako earned his first call up to the Kenya national football team in February 2005 while at Tusker then coached by Mohamed Kheri for a game against Botswana in a 2006 Nations Cup/World Cup qualifier.

A year and a half later under caretaker coach Tom Olaba, Osiako got his first international cap in a friendly game against Tanzania that ended in a 0–0 draw at the National Stadium in Dar es Salaam on 4 October 2006. Osiako went on to earn 13 National caps between 2006 and 2013.

== Career statistics ==
=== Club ===
As of 8 February 2015

Club performance			League		Cup		Continental		Total	
Season	Club	League	Apps	Goals	Apps	Goals	Apps	Goals	Apps	Goals
2007	Mjällby AIF	Superettan	22	0			-		22	0
2008	Mjällby AIF	Superettan	29	1			-		29	1
2009	Mjällby AIF	Superettan	28	4	3	0	-		31	4
2010	Mjällby AIF	Allsvenskan	27	0	3	0	-		30	0
2011	Mjällby AIF	Allsvenskan	19	1	0	0	-		19	1
2011–12	Petrolul Ploiești	Liga I	11	1	0	0	-		11	1
2012–13	Hapoel Be'er Sheva	Israeli Premier League	28	1	5	0	-		33	1
2013–14	Simurq	Azerbaijan Premier League	25	1	0	0	-		25	1
2014–15	Simurq	Azerbaijan Premier League	14	0	1	0	-		15	0
Total	Sweden		125	6	6	0	-		131	6
Total	Romania		11	1	0	0	-		11	1
Total	Israel		28	1	5	0	-		33	1
Total	Azerbaijan		39	1	1	0	-		40	1
Career total			201	9	12	0	-		213	9

=== International ===
Kenya
Year	Apps	Goals
2006	2	0
2009	3	0
2010	2	0
2012	3	0
2013	2	0
Total	12	0

Statistics accurate as of match played 12 June 2013

== Honours ==
=== Club ===
Mjällby AIF

- Superettan (1): 2009
