= Ruslan Poladov =

Azerbaijani footballer (born 1979)

Personal information
- Full name: Ruslan Poladov
- Date of birth: 30 November 1979 (age 46)
- Place of birth: Sumqayit, Azerbaijan
- Height: 1.72 m (5 ft 7 1/2 in)
- Position: Defender

Team information
- Current team: Qaradağ Lökbatan
- Number: 55

Senior career*
Years	Team	Apps	(Gls)
2003–2004	Khazar Sumgayit	13	(3)
2004–2005	Gänclärbirliyi Sumqayit	30	(1)
2005–2007	Ravan Baku	35	(1)
2007	Standard Baku	11	(0)
2008–2011	Khazar Lankaran	48	(0)
2011–2012	Inter Baku	3	(0)
2012	→ Simurq	14	(1)
2012–2014	Simurq	57	(2)
2014–2015	Sumgayit	27	(0)
2015–2016	Zira	2	(0)
2016–2017	Shamkir	23	(0)
2017–	Qaradağ Lökbatan		

International career
2005	Azerbaijan	1	(0)
- * Club domestic league appearances and goals as of 5 October 2017

Ruslan Poladov (born 30 November 1979) is an Azerbaijani football player currently playing for Qaradağ Lökbatan in the Azerbaijan First Division

== Career ==
=== Club ===
In May 2014, Poladov signed a one-year contract with Sumgayit. Zira announced on 23 May that Poladov had left the club at the end of his contract.

=== International ===
Poladov made his debut, and only appearance to date, for Azerbaijan on 12 October 2005 coming on as an 88th-minute substitute for Emin Imamaliev in their 2–0 away defeat to Wales in the 2006 World Cup qualification match.

== Career statistics ==
=== Club ===
As of match played 27 April 2017

Appearances and goals by club, season and competition
Club	Season	League			National Cup		Continental		Other		Total	
Club	Season	Division	Apps	Goals	Apps	Goals	Apps	Goals	Apps	Goals	Apps	Goals
Khazar Sumgayit	2003–04	Azerbaijan Top League	13	3			–		–		13	3
Gänclärbirliyi Sumqayit	2004–05	Azerbaijan Top League	30	1			–		–		30	1
Inter Baku	2005–06	Azerbaijan Top League	14	1			–		–		14	1
Inter Baku	2006–07	Azerbaijan Top League	21	0			–		–		21	0
Inter Baku	Total		35	1			-	-	-	-	35	1
Standard Baku	2007–08	Azerbaijan Premier League	11	0			–		–		11	0
Khazar Lankaran	2007–08	Azerbaijan Premier League	8	0			0	0	–		8	0
Khazar Lankaran	2008–09	Azerbaijan Premier League	9	0			0	0	–		8	0
Khazar Lankaran	2009–10	Azerbaijan Premier League	15	0			–		–		15	0
Khazar Lankaran	2010–11	Azerbaijan Premier League	16	0	1	0	0	0	–		17	0
Khazar Lankaran	Total		48	0			0	0	-	-	48	0
Inter Baku	2011–12	Azerbaijan Premier League	3	0	0	0	–		–		3	0
Simurq (loan)	2011–12	Azerbaijan Premier League	14	1	0	0	–		–		14	1
Simurq	2012–13	Azerbaijan Premier League	26	1	3	1	–		–		29	2
Simurq	2013–14	Azerbaijan Premier League	31	0	0	0	–		–		31	0
Simurq	Total		57	1	3	1	-	-	-	-	60	2
Sumgayit	2014–15	Azerbaijan Premier League	27	0	1	0	–		–		28	0
Zira	2015–16	Azerbaijan Premier League	2	0	2	0	–		–		4	0
Shamkir	2016–17	Azerbaijan First Division	23	0	1	0	–		–		24	0
Career total			263	7	8	1	0	0	-	-	271	8
