= Murad Sattarli =

Azerbaijani footballer (born 1992)

Personal information
- Full name: Murad Mutallim oglu Sattarli
- Date of birth: 9 May 1992 (age 34)
- Place of birth: Şəmkir, Azerbaijan
- Height: 1.75 m (5 ft 9 in)
- Position: Attacking midfielder

Youth career
- Dynamo Stavropol
- CSKA Moscow
- Mashuk-KMV

Senior career*
Years	Team	Apps	(Gls)
2010–2013	Qarabağ	1	(0)
2010–2011	→ MOIK Baku (loan)	2	(0)
2011–2012	→ Sumgayit (loan)	12	(1)
2012–2013	→ Simurq (loan)	30	(2)
2014	Simurq	18	(0)
2015–2016	AZAL	31	(4)
2016–2017	Zira	9	(0)
2018	Kapaz	4	(0)
2019–2022	Baku		
2022	Yessentuki	13	(0)

International career^{‡}
2010	Azerbaijan U19	3	(0)
2016–	Azerbaijan	1	(0)
- * Club domestic league appearances and goals as of 5 June 2022 ‡ National team caps and goals as of 27 May 2016

Murad Sattarli (Azerbaijani: Murad Səttarlı; born on 9 May 1992) is an Azerbaijani football offensive midfielder.

== Career ==
=== Club ===
In January 2014, Sattarli moved from Qarabağ to Simurq on a six-month contract. A year later, January 2015, Sattarli left Simurq by mutual consent.

On 17 June 2016, Sattarli signed a two-year contract with Zira.

On 25 December 2017, Sattarli signed one-year contract with Kapaz.

=== International ===
On 26 May 2016 Sattarli made his senior international debut for Azerbaijan friendly match against Andorra.

== Career statistics ==
=== Club ===
As of match played 10 April 2017

Appearances and goals by club, season and competition
Club	Season	League			National Cup		Continental		Total	
Club	Season	Division	Apps	Goals	Apps	Goals	Apps	Goals	Apps	Goals
Qarabağ	2010–11	Azerbaijan Premier League	1	0	0	0	0	0	1	0
Qarabağ	2011–12	Azerbaijan Premier League	0	0	0	0	0	0	0	0
Qarabağ	2012–13	Azerbaijan Premier League	0	0	0	0	0	0	0	0
Qarabağ	2013–14	Azerbaijan Premier League	0	0	0	0	4	0	4	0
Qarabağ	Total		1	0	0	0	4	0	5	0
MOIK Baku (loan)	2010–11	Azerbaijan Premier League	2	0	0	0	-		2	0
Sumgayit (loan)	2011–12	Azerbaijan Premier League	12	1	1	0	-		13	1
Simurq (loan)	2012–13	Azerbaijan Premier League	30	2	3	0	-		33	2
Simurq	2013–14	Azerbaijan Premier League	14	0	0	0	-		14	0
Simurq	2014–15	Azerbaijan Premier League	4	0	0	0	-		4	0
Simurq	Total		18	0	0	0	-	-	18	0
AZAL	2015–16	Azerbaijan Premier League	31	4	0	0	-		31	4
Zira	2016–17	Azerbaijan Premier League	9	0	1	0	-		10	0
Career total			103	7	5	0	4	0	112	7

=== International ===
Azerbaijan
Year	Apps	Goals
2016	1	0
Total	1	0

Statistics accurate as of match played 26 May 2016
