= Paulius Paknys =

Lithuanian footballer

Personal information
- Date of birth: 10 May 1984 (age 42)
- Place of birth: Vilnius, Lithuanian SSR
- Height: 1.85 m (6 ft 1 in)
- Position: Defender

Senior career*
Years	Team	Apps	(Gls)
2002–2003	Šviesa Vilnius	13	(0)
2003	Ekranas Panevėžys	2	(0)
2004	Šilutė	17	(0)
2005	Žalgiris Vilnius	17	(0)
2006–2007	Shakhtyor Soligorsk	1	(0)
2007–2008	Kmita Zabierzów	34	(0)
2009	Stal Stalowa Wola	11	(0)
2009	Korona Kielce	6	(0)
2010	Inter Baku	6	(0)
2010–2011	Simurq Zaqatala	10	(0)
2011	Rotalis Vilnius		
2011	Kolejarz Stróże	0	(0)
2012	Puszcza Niepołomice	0	(0)
- * Club domestic league appearances and goals

Paulius Paknys (born 10 May 1984) is a Lithuanian former professional footballer who played as a defender.

== Honours ==
Inter Baku

- Azerbaijan Premier League: 2009–10
