= Dilaver Zrnanović =

Bosnian footballer

Personal information
- Date of birth: 17 November 1984 (age 41)
- Place of birth: Sarajevo, SFR Yugoslavia
- Height: 1.89 m (6 ft 2 1/2 in)
- Position: Defender

Youth career
- 2002–2004: Budućnost Banovići

Senior career*
Years	Team	Apps	(Gls)
2004–2005	Budućnost Banovići	28	(0)
2006–2007	Moscow	0	(0)
2007	→ Daugava Daugavpils (loan)	9	(0)
2008–2010	MTZ-RIPO Minsk	37	(1)
2010–2011	Budućnost Banovići	20	(1)
2011–2012	Sarajevo	20	(0)
2012–2014	Simurq	48	(0)
2015	Sloboda Tuzla	11	(0)
- * Club domestic league appearances and goals as of 7 October 2015

Dilaver Zrnanović (born 17 November 1984) is a Bosnian retired football defender.

== Club career ==
Zrnanović signed with FC Moscow but only appeared in one 1/16th round Russian Cup match for the club. After a brief loan spell, he signed with MTZ-RIPO Minsk in 2008. He scored his first Belarusian Premier League goal for MTZ-RIPO in a 4–2 victory against FC Gomel on 19 September 2009.

In August 2011 Zrnanović agreed a one-year contract with FK Sarajevo. A year later, after his Sarajevo contract had expired, Zrnanović joined Azerbaijan Premier League side Simurq. Zrnanović made his debut for Simurq on 4 August 2012 in a 1–1 draw against Gabala. Zrnanović left Simurq at the end of the 2013–14 season after losing his place in the team to Idan Weitzman.

== Career statistics ==
As of 7 October 2015

Club performance			League		Cup		Continental		Total	
Season	Club	League	Apps	Goals	Apps	Goals	Apps	Goals	Apps	Goals
2010–11	Budućnost	BHT P. liga	21	1			0	0	21	1
2011–12	FK Sarajevo	BHT P. liga	17	0	3	0	0	0	20	0
2012-13	Simurq	Azerbaijan Premier League	28	0	3	0	0	0	31	0
2013-14	Simurq	Azerbaijan Premier League	20	0	1	0	0	0	21	0
2014–15	Sloboda Tuzla	BHT P. liga	11	0	0	0	0	0	11	0
Total	Bosnia and Herzegovina		49	1	3	0	0	0	52	1
Total	Azerbaijan		48	0	4	0	0	0	52	0
Career total			97	1	7	0	0	0	104	1

== Honours ==
- Russian Cup finalist: 2007 (played 1 game for the main squad of FC Moscow).
