= Elvin Yunuszade =

Azerbaijani footballer (born 1992)

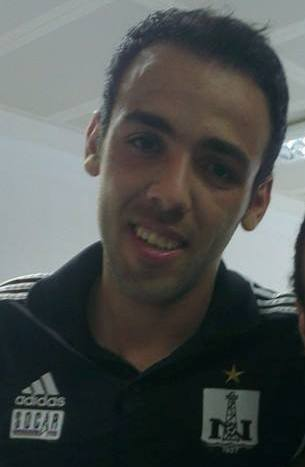
- Yunuszade in 2024

Personal information
- Full name: Elvin Garib oglu Yunuszade
- Date of birth: 22 August 1992 (age 34)
- Place of birth: Qazakh, Azerbaijan
- Height: 1.91 m (6 ft 3 in)
- Position: Defender

Team information
- Current team: Boluspor
- Number: 32

Senior career*
Years	Team	Apps	(Gls)
2010–2015	Neftchi Baku	75	(1)
2010–2011	→ Simurq (loan)	31	(2)
2015–2018	Qarabağ	52	(3)
2018–2019	Sabah	2	(0)
2019	Sabail	23	(2)
2020	Čelik Zenica	0	(0)
2020	Shkupi	2	(0)
2021	Keşla	0	(0)
2022–2023	Kapaz	5	(0)
2023	Iravan		(0)
2024–2025	Gabala	20	(0)
2025–2026	Karvan	19	(0)
2026–	Boluspor	2	(0)

International career
2012–2013	Azerbaijan U21	3	(0)
2014	Azerbaijan	3	(1)
- * Club domestic league appearances and goals as of 18 October 2026

Elvin Yunuszade (Azerbaijani: Elvin Yunuszadə; born 22 August 1992) is an Azerbaijani professional footballer who plays as a defender for Turkish TFF 1. Lig club Boluspor.

== Club career ==
Yunuszade was born in Qazax. On 24 May 2018, Qarabağ FK announced that Yunuszade had been released by the club following expiration of his contract.

On 9 January 2019, Sabail announced the singing of Yunuszade. On 21 December 2019, Yunuszade left Sabail by mutual consent.

On 9 February 2020, Yunuszade signed contract with NK Čelik Zenica until the end of the 2019–20 season.

On 10 August 2020, Yunuszade signed contract with KF Shkupi until the end of the 2020–21 season.

On 14 August 2024, Gabala announced the signing of free-agent Yunuszade to a one-year contract. On 27 June 2025, Gabala announced that Yunuszade's contract hadn't been renewed and that he had left the club after playing 22 games.

== International career ==
Yunuszade made his debut for the Azerbaijan national team on 5 March 2014, scoring the winning goal in the 1–0 victory over Philippines in a friendly match.

== Career statistics ==
=== Club ===
As of match played 1 December 2018

Appearances and goals by club, season and competition
Club	Season	League			National cup		Continental		Other		Total	
Club	Season	Division	Apps	Goals	Apps	Goals	Apps	Goals	Apps	Goals	Apps	Goals
Neftchi Baku	2010–11	Azerbaijan Premier League	0	0	0	0	–		–		0	0
Neftchi Baku	2011–12	Azerbaijan Premier League	10	0	3	0	0	0	–		13	0
Neftchi Baku	2012–13	Azerbaijan Premier League	24	0	5	2	9	0	–		38	2
Neftchi Baku	2013–14	Azerbaijan Premier League	20	1	6	0	1	0	0	0	27	1
Neftchi Baku	2014–15	Azerbaijan Premier League	21	0	4	0	6	0	–		31	0
Neftchi Baku	Total		75	1	18	2	16	0	0	0	109	3
Simurq (loan)	2010–11	Azerbaijan Premier League	31	2	1	0	–		–		32	2
Qarabağ	2015–16	Azerbaijan Premier League	19	0	4	0	2	0	–		25	0
Qarabağ	2016–17	Azerbaijan Premier League	13	1	4	0	4	0	–		21	1
Qarabağ	2017–18	Azerbaijan Premier League	20	2	3	0	5	0	–		28	2
Qarabağ	Total		52	3	11	0	11	0	-	-	74	3
Sabah	2018–19	Azerbaijan Premier League	2	0	0	0	–		–		2	0
Career total			160	6	30	2	27	0	0	0	217	8

=== International ===
Azerbaijan
Year	Apps	Goals
2014	3	1
Total	3	1

Statistics accurate as of match played 16 November 2014

Scores and results list Azerbaijan's goal tally first.

#	Date	Venue	Opponent	Score	Result	Competition
1.	5 March 2014	Maktoum Bin Rashid Al Maktoum Stadium, Dubai, United Arab Emirates	Philippines	1–0	1–0	Friendly match

== Honours ==
Neftchi Baku

- Azerbaijan Premier League: 2011–12, 2012–13
- Azerbaijan Cup: 2012–13

Qarabağ

- Azerbaijan Premier League: 2015–16, 2016–17, 2017–18
- Azerbaijan Cup: 2015-16
