= Marcin Burkhardt =

Polish footballer (born 1983)

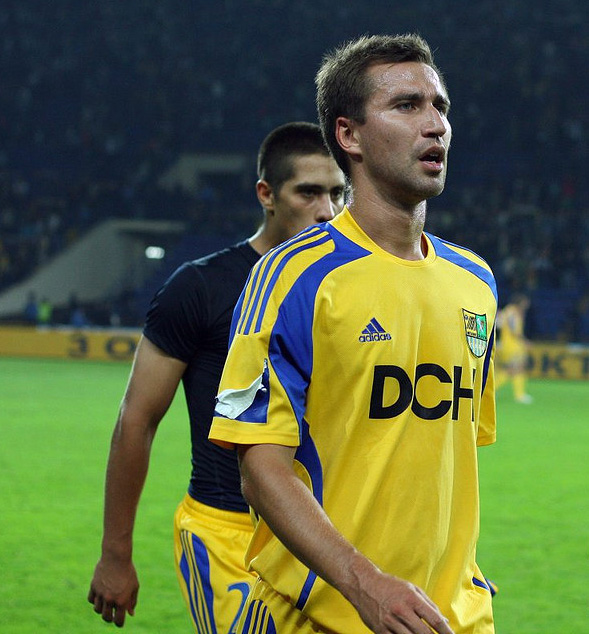
- Burkhardt with Metalist Kharkiv in 2009

Personal information
- Full name: Marcin Burkhardt
- Date of birth: 25 September 1983 (age 43)
- Place of birth: Elbląg, Poland
- Height: 1.88 m (6 ft 2 in)
- Position: Midfielder

Team information
- Current team: Błękitni Gąbin; Weszło Warsaw (assistant)
- Number: 18

Youth career
- Olimpia Poznań
- SKS 13 Poznań
- 1999–2000: Olimpia Poznań

Senior career*
Years	Team	Apps	(Gls)
2001–2006	Amica Wronki	83	(7)
2005–2006	→ Legia Warsaw (loan)	23	(4)
2006–2008	Legia Warsaw	22	(2)
2008–2009	IFK Norrköping	29	(5)
2009–2010	Metalist Kharkiv	7	(0)
2010	→ Jagiellonia Białystok (loan)	22	(3)
2011–2012	Jagiellonia Białystok	29	(2)
2012–2013	Simurq PFC	24	(5)
2013–2014	Miedź Legnica	12	(0)
2014–2015	Cherno More Varna	28	(3)
2016	Ullensaker/Kisa IL	6	(0)
2016–2017	Pogoń Siedlce	27	(2)
2017–2018	Motor Lublin	14	(2)
2018–2019	Legionovia Legionowo	29	(6)
2019–2020	Gryf Wejherowo	28	(1)
2020–2021	Pogoń Siedlce	3	(0)
2020–2022	Pogoń Siedlce II	21	(3)
2022–2024	Weszło Warsaw	37	(4)
2024–2025	KS Raszyn	11	(2)
2025–2026	Grom Warsaw	28	(6)
2026–	Błękitni Gąbin	10	(3)

International career
2003–2005	Poland	10	(1)

Managerial career
- 2020: Gryf Wejherowo (caretaker)
- 2024: Weszło Warsaw (player-interim manager)
- * Club domestic league appearances and goals as of 22:16, 30 June 2026 (UTC)

Marcin Burkhardt (Polish pronunciation: [ˈmart͡ɕin ˈburkxart]; born 25 September 1983) is a Polish professional footballer who plays as a midfielder for V liga Masovia club Błękitni Gąbin. He is also the assistant coach of Weszło Warsaw. From 2021 to 2022, he served as the sporting director of Pogoń Siedlce.

== Club career ==
Burkhardt made his debut in the Polish league on September 16, 2001 in Amica Wronki against Dyskobolia Grodzisk and has scored seven goals as of this campaign. For Legia he scored 4 goals – in matches Amica-Legia, Dyskobolia-Legia, Wisla Plock-Legia and Odra Wodzislaw-Legia. He played for Legia Warsaw until 30 March 2008. The day after he joined the IFK Norrköping squad for three years.

On 19 August 2009 Burkhardt left IFK Norrköping for Metalist Kharkiv for three years.

In February 2010, Burkhardt was loaned to Jagiellonia Białystok on a half year deal. He was sold to this club one year later.

During the summer of 2012 Burkhardt signed for Azerbaijan Premier League club Simurq. Burkhardt played 24 times for Simurq, scoring 5 times, during the 2012–13 season.

On 8 September 2014, Burkhardt signed for Bulgarian side Cherno More. He made his debut coming on as a substitute for Todor Palankov in a league game against CSKA Sofia on 13 September. On 20 March 2015, Burkhardt scored the only goal in Cherno More's 1–0 victory over Marek Dupnitsa. He ended his debut campaign at Cherno More with 4 goals in all competitions. In June 2015, Burkhardt signed a new contract with the club keeping him with the Sailors until the end of the 2015–16 season. However, he left the team in December 2015 due to injury issues.

On 15 December 2017, Burkhardt joined III liga team Motor Lublin.

== International career ==
Burkhardt has appeared 10 times and scored one goal for the Poland national team.

== Career statistics ==
=== International ===
Appearances and goals by national team and year
National team	Year	Apps	Goals
Poland
Poland	2003	6	1
Poland	2004	3	0
Poland	2005	1	0
Total		10	1

Scores and results list Poland's goal tally first, score column indicates score after each Burkhardt goal.

List of international goals scored by Marcin Burkhardt
No.	Date	Venue	Opponent	Score	Result	Competition
1	11 December 2003	Ta' Qali National Stadium, Ta' Qali, Malta	Malta	4–0	4–0	Friendly

== Personal life ==
He is the brother of Filip Burkhardt.

== Honours ==
Legia Warsaw

- Ekstraklasa: 2005–06
- Polish Cup: 2007–08

Jagiellonia Białystok

- Polish Cup: 2009–10
- Polish Super Cup: 2010

Cherno More

- Bulgarian Cup: 2014–15

Legionovia Legionowo

- III liga, group I: 2018–19

Weszło Warsaw

- V liga Masovia I: 2022–23
- Regional league Warsaw I: 2021–22
- Polish Cup (Warsaw regionals): 2022–23, 2023–24

Błękitni Gąbin

- Regional league Płock: 2025–26
