= Idan Weitzman =

Israeli footballer

Idan Weitzman עידן ויצמן
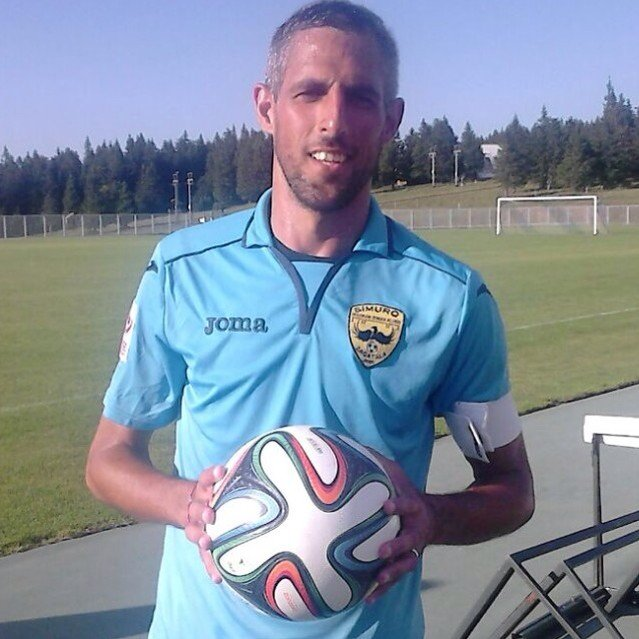

Personal information
- Full name: Idan Weitzman
- Date of birth: April 20, 1985 (age 41)
- Place of birth: Nesher, Israel
- Height: 1.86 m (6 ft 1 in)
- Positions: Defender; midfielder

Team information
- Current team: Shimshon Kafr Qasim

Youth career
- F.C. Neve Yosef

Senior career*
Years	Team	Apps	(Gls)
2004–2005	Ironi Kiryat Ata	?	(?)
2005–2007	Hapoel Acre	32	(3)
2007	Hapoel Nazareth Illit	13	(1)
2008–2009	Hakoah Amidar Ramat Gan	44	(5)
2009–2010	F.C. Ashdod	18	(1)
2010–2011	Hapoel Haifa	11	(0)
2011–2013	Bnei Sakhnin	79	(2)
2013–2015	Simurq	50	(4)
2015–2016	Hapoel Afula	31	(1)
2016–2018	Ironi Tiberias	63	(3)
2018–2019	Hapoel Robi Shapira Haifa	23	(3)
2019–2020	Hapoel Migdal HaEmek	22	(0)
2020–2021	Ironi Tiberias	21	(0)
2021–2022	Shimshon Kafr Qasim	29	(0)
2022–2023	Hapoel Tirat HaCarmel	2	(0)
2023	Beitar Tel Aviv Bat Yam	10	(1)
2023–	Shimshon Kafr Qasim	23	(0)

Managerial career
- 2021: Ironi Tiberias
- * Club domestic league appearances and goals as of 1 February 2024

Idan Weitzman (Hebrew: עידן ויצמן; born April 20, 1985) is an Israeli professional footballer.

== Simurq ==
In August 2013 Weitzman joined Azerbaijan Premier League side Simurq from Bnei Sakhnin. Weitzman became the first Israeli to appear in the Azerbaijan Premier League when he made his debut on 21 September 2013, coming on as a 52nd-minute substitute for Dilaver Zrnanović, in their 0–0 away draw against Qarabağ.

== Career statistics ==
As of 15 October 2015

Club performance			League		Cup		Continental		Total	
Season	Club	League	Apps	Goals	Apps	Goals	Apps	Goals	Apps	Goals
2009-10	Ashdod	Israeli Premier League	18	1			-		18	1
2010-11	Hapoel Haifa	Israeli Premier League	11	0			-		15	0
2010-11	Bnei Sakhnin	Israeli Premier League	15	0			-		15	0
2011-12	Bnei Sakhnin	Israeli Premier League	35	1			-		35	1
2012-13	Bnei Sakhnin	Israeli Premier League	29	1			-		29	1
2013-14	Simurq	Azerbaijan Premier League	24	1	1	0	-		25	1
2014-15	Simurq	Azerbaijan Premier League	26	2	5	0	-		31	2
Total	Israel		108	3			-		108	3
Total	Azerbaijan		50	2	6	0	-		56	2
Career total			158	5	6	0	-		164	5
