= Paweł Kapsa =

Polish footballer

Personal information
- Full name: Paweł Rafał Kapsa
- Date of birth: 24 July 1982 (age 44)
- Place of birth: Staszów, Poland
- Height: 1.86 m (6 ft 1 in)
- Position: Goalkeeper

Team information
- Current team: Alit Ożarów
- Number: 1

Senior career*
| Years | Team | Apps | (Gls) |
| 1998–2002 | KSZO Ostrowiec | 9 | (0) |
| 2002–2004 | Wisła Płock | 22 | (0) |
| 2004–2005 | Widzew Łódź | 2 | (0) |
| 2005–2007 | KSZO Ostrowiec | 65 | (0) |
| 2007–2011 | Lechia Gdańsk | 84 | (0) |
| 2011 | Lechia Gdańsk II | 1 | (0) |
| 2011–2012 | Alki Larnaca | 9 | (0) |
| 2012–2013 | Olympiakos Nicosia | 31 | (0) |
| 2013–2015 | Simurq | 58 | (0) |
| 2015 | Khazar Lankaran | 0 | (0) |
| 2016–2018 | Miedź Legnica | 58 | (0) |
| 2018 | Miedź Legnica II | 9 | (0) |
| 2018–2019 | Sandecja Nowy Sącz | 0 | (0) |
| 2019 | Bytovia Bytów | 12 | (0) |
| 2020–2023 | SK Bischofshofen | 70 | (0) |
| 2023– | Alit Ożarów | 18 | (0) |

International career
| 1998–1999 | Poland U16 | | |
| 1999–2000 | Poland U17 | 6 | (0) |
| 2000–2001 | Poland U18 | 7 | (0) |
| 2002–2003 | Poland U21 | 2 | (0) |
Medal record
Men's football
Representing Poland
UEFA European Under-18 Championship
| Winner | 2001 Finland |
UEFA European Under-16 Championship
| Runner-up | 1999 Czech Republic |
- * Club domestic league appearances and goals as of 22:43, 24 June 2025 (UTC)

Paweł Rafał Kapsa (born 24 July 1982) is a Polish professional footballer who plays as a goalkeeper for IV liga Świętokrzyskie Alit Ożarów, where he also serves as the goalkeeping coach.

== Career ==
In July 2013 Kapsa signed for Simurq of the Azerbaijan Premier League from Olympiakos Nicosia.

== Career statistics ==
As of match played 28 August 2024

Appearances and goals by club, season and competition
| Club | Season | League | | | National cup (Note: Includes Polish Cup, Cypriot Cup, Azerbaijan Cup) | | Europe | | Other | | Total | |
| Club | Season | Division | Apps | Goals | Apps | Goals | Apps | Goals | Apps | Goals | Apps | Goals |
|---|---|---|---|---|---|---|---|---|---|---|---|---|
| KSZO Ostrowiec | 1998–99 | II liga | | | | | — | | | | | |
| KSZO Ostrowiec | 1999–2000 | II liga | | | | | — | | | | | |
| KSZO Ostrowiec | 2000–01 | II liga | | | 0 | 0 | — | | 1 (Note: Appearance(s) in Polish League Cup) | 0 | 1 | 0 |
| KSZO Ostrowiec | 2001–02 | Ekstraklasa | 9 | 0 | 1 | 0 | — | | 3 | 0 | 13 | 0 |
| KSZO Ostrowiec | Total | | 9 | 0 | 1 | 0 | — | | 4 | 0 | 14 | 0 |
| Wisła Płock | 2002–03 | Ekstraklasa | 8 | 0 | 8 | 0 | — | | — | | 16 | 0 |
| Wisła Płock | 2003–04 | Ekstraklasa | 14 | 0 | 0 | 0 | 1 (Note: Appearance in UEFA Cup) | 0 | — | | 15 | 0 |
| Wisła Płock | Total | | 22 | 0 | 8 | 0 | 1 | 0 | — | | 31 | 0 |
| Widzew Łódź | 2004–05 | II liga | 2 | 0 | 1 | 0 | — | | — | | 3 | 0 |
| KSZO Ostrowiec | 2005–06 | II liga | 32 | 0 | 3 | 0 | — | | — | | 35 | 0 |
| KSZO Ostrowiec | 2006–07 | II liga | 33 | 0 | 1 | 0 | — | | — | | 34 | 0 |
| KSZO Ostrowiec | Total | | 65 | 0 | 4 | 0 | — | | — | | 69 | 0 |
| Lechia Gdańsk | 2007–08 | II liga | 24 | 0 | 4 | 0 | — | | — | | 28 | 0 |
| Lechia Gdańsk | 2008–09 | Ekstraklasa | 18 | 0 | 1 | 0 | — | | 4 (Note: Appearances in Ekstraklasa Cup) | 0 | 23 | 0 |
| Lechia Gdańsk | 2009–10 | Ekstraklasa | 23 | 0 | 5 | 0 | — | | — | | 28 | 0 |
| Lechia Gdańsk | 2010–11 | Ekstraklasa | 19 | 0 | 2 | 0 | — | | — | | 21 | 0 |
| Lechia Gdańsk | Total | | 84 | 0 | 12 | 0 | — | | 4 | 0 | 100 | 0 |
| Lechia Gdańsk II | 2010–11 | III liga, gr. D | 1 | 0 | — | | — | | — | | 1 | 0 |
| Alki Larnaca | 2011–12 | Cypriot First Division | 9 | 0 | 2 | 0 | — | | — | | 11 | 0 |
| Olympiakos Nicosia | 2012–13 | Cypriot First Division | 31 | 0 | 2 | 0 | — | | — | | 33 | 0 |
| Simurq | 2013–14 | Azerbaijan Premier League | 32 | 0 | 1 | 0 | — | | — | | 33 | 0 |
| Simurq | 2014–15 | Azerbaijan Premier League | 26 | 0 | 4 | 0 | — | | — | | 30 | 0 |
| Simurq | Total | | 58 | 0 | 5 | 0 | — | | — | | 63 | 0 |
| Khazar Lankaran | 2015–16 | Azerbaijan Premier League | 0 | 0 | 0 | 0 | — | | — | | 0 | 0 |
| Miedź Legnica | 2015–16 | I liga | 15 | 0 | — | | — | | — | | 15 | 0 |
| Miedź Legnica | 2016–17 | I liga | 31 | 0 | 1 | 0 | — | | — | | 32 | 0 |
| Miedź Legnica | 2017–18 | I liga | 12 | 0 | 1 | 0 | — | | — | | 13 | 0 |
| Miedź Legnica | Total | | 58 | 0 | 2 | 0 | — | | — | | 60 | 0 |
| Miedź Legnica II | 2017–18 | III liga, gr. III | 9 | 0 | — | | — | | — | | 9 | 0 |
| Sandecja Nowy Sącz | 2018–19 | I liga | 0 | 0 | 1 | 0 | — | | — | | 1 | 0 |
| Bytovia Bytów | 2019–20 | II liga | 12 | 0 | 2 | 0 | — | | — | | 14 | 0 |
| SK Bischofshofen | 2019–20 | Austrian Regionalliga | 0 | 0 | — | | — | | — | | 0 | 0 |
| SK Bischofshofen | 2020–21 | Austrian Regionalliga | 13 | 0 | — | | — | | — | | 13 | 0 |
| SK Bischofshofen | 2021–22 | Austrian Regionalliga | 28 | 0 | — | | — | | — | | 28 | 0 |
| SK Bischofshofen | 2022–23 | Austrian Regionalliga | 29 | 0 | — | | — | | — | | 29 | 0 |
| SK Bischofshofen | Total | | 70 | 0 | — | | — | | — | | 70 | 0 |
| Alit Ożarów | 2023–24 | IV liga Świętokrzyskie | 13 | 0 | — | | — | | — | | 13 | 0 |
| Alit Ożarów | 2024–25 | IV liga Świętokrzyskie | 5 | 0 | — | | — | | — | | 5 | 0 |
| Alit Ożarów | Total | | 18 | 0 | — | | — | | — | | 18 | 0 |
| Career total | | | 447 | 0 | 40 | 0 | 1 | 0 | 8 | 0 | 496 | 0 |

== Honours ==
Lechia Gdańsk

- II liga: 2007–08

Miedź Legnica

- I liga: 2017–18

Poland U16

- UEFA European Under-16 Championship runner-up: 1999

Poland U18

- UEFA European Under-18 Championship: 2001
