= Rashad Eyyubov =

Azerbaijani footballer (born 1992)

Personal information
- Full name: Rashad Elman oglu Eyyubov
- Date of birth: 3 December 1992 (age 33)
- Place of birth: Sumgayit, Azerbaijan
- Height: 1.75 m (5 ft 9 in)
- Positions: Attacking midfielder; forward

Youth career
- 2002–2008: Chornomorets Odesa
- 2008–2009: Metalurh Donetsk
- 2009–2011: Chornomorets Odesa

Senior career*
Years	Team	Apps	(Gls)
2011–2015	Simurq	79	(16)
2015	Khazar Lankaran	0	(0)
2015	Kapaz	13	(1)
2016–2017	Gabala	25	(3)
2017–2018	Sumgayit	23	(3)
2018	Neftçi	5	(0)
2019–2020	Sabah	24	(3)
2020	Zira	3	(0)

International career^{‡}
2008	Ukraine U17	1	(1)
2009	Azerbaijan U17	5	(1)
2013–2014	Azerbaijan U19	7	(2)
2013–2014	Azerbaijan U21	5	(0)
2015–2019	Azerbaijan	7	(0)

Managerial career
- 2025–: Azerbaijan U21
- * Club domestic league appearances and goals as of 8 January 2025 ‡ National team caps and goals as of 8 January 2025

Rashad Eyyubov (Azerbaijani: Rəşad Eyyubov; born on 3 December 1992 in Sumgayit) is an Azerbaijani football coach and former player. He is the coach of the Azerbaijan national under-21 football team.

== Career ==
=== Club ===
On 22 May 2017, Eyyubov signed a one-year contract with Sumgayit FK.

On 12 June 2018, Eyyubov signed a one-year contract with Neftçi PFK, but left by mutual consent on 20 December 2018.

On 18 July 2020, he signed a one-year contract with Zira FK.

=== International ===
On 17 November 2015 Eyyubov made his senior international debut for Azerbaijan game against Moldova.

=== After retirement ===
After ending his football career, he worked as the coach of the U19 team and the reserve team at Sabah. In February 2024, he was appointed as an assistant coach for the main team. On 7 January 2025 Eyyubov was appointed as a coach of the Azerbaijan national football team.

On 4 October 2025, Eyyubov was appointed as the head coach of the Azerbaijan national under-21 football team.

== Career statistics ==
=== Club ===
As of match played 29 April 2017

Appearances and goals by club, season and competition
Club	Season	League			National Cup		Continental		Other		Total	
Club	Season	Division	Apps	Goals	Apps	Goals	Apps	Goals	Apps	Goals	Apps	Goals
Simurq	2011–12	Azerbaijan Premier League	4	0	0	0	–		–		4	0
Simurq	2012–13	Azerbaijan Premier League	15	2	3	0	–		–		18	2
Simurq	2013–14	Azerbaijan Premier League	31	3	1	2	–		–		32	5
Simurq	2014–15	Azerbaijan Premier League	28	8	5	1	–		–		33	9
Simurq	Total		78	13	9	3	0	0	0	0	87	16
Kapaz	2015–16	Azerbaijan Premier League	13	1	1	0	–		–		14	1
Gabala	2015–16	Azerbaijan Premier League	17	1	4	1	–		–		21	2
Gabala	2016–17	Azerbaijan Premier League	8	2	4	1	8	0	–		20	3
Gabala	Total		25	3	8	2	8	0	0	0	41	5
Career total			116	17	18	5	8	0	0	0	142	22

=== International ===
Azerbaijan
Year	Apps	Goals
2015	1	0
2016	1	0
2017	0	0
2018	1	0
2018	1	0
2019	3	0
Total	7	0

Statistics accurate as of match played 11 June 2019
