= Nenad Kiso =

Bosnian-Herzegovinian footballer (born 1989)

Nenad Kiso Ненад Кисо
Personal information
- Date of birth: 30 April 1989 (age 37)
- Place of birth: Ljubljana, SFR Yugoslavia
- Height: 1.82 m (5 ft 11 1/2 in)
- Position: Midfielder

Team information
- Current team: Zemun

Youth career
- Partizan
- 2007–2008: Čukarički

Senior career*
Years	Team	Apps	(Gls)
2008–2010	Čukarički	63	(2)
2011	Olimpik Sarajevo	25	(1)
2012	Hapoel Be'er Sheva	16	(0)
2012	Debreceni VSC	0	(0)
2013	Simurq	28	(0)
2014–2015	Sloboda Tuzla	30	(1)
2016	Borac Banja Luka	26	(1)
2017	Olimpik Sarajevo	5	(0)
2017–2018	Zemun	30	(0)
2018–2019	Čukarički	7	(0)
2019	→ Zemun (loan)	14	(0)
2019–2021	Zemun	15	(0)
2020–2021	Žarkovo	33	(2)
2021–	Zemun		

International career
2008–2010	Bosnia and Herzegovina U21	13	(0)
- * Club domestic league appearances and goals as of 19 May 2021

Nenad Kiso (Serbian Cyrillic: Ненад Кисо; born 30 April 1989) is a Bosnian-Herzegovinian footballer who plays for Serbian club Zemun.

== Club career ==
Born in Ljubljana, SR Slovenia, back then still part of Yugoslavia, he started playing in the FK Partizan youth teams. He spent three seasons at the Serbian Superliga club Čukarički from the Serbian capital Belgrade. He usually plays as a central midfielder. He also previously played for Debreceni VSC.

During the 2013 Winter transfer window Kiso left Debreceni for Azerbaijan Premier League side Simurq. Kiso made his debut for Simurq on 22 February 2013 in a 0–0 home draw against Baku. Kiso left Simurq at the end of his contract in December 2013.

== International career ==
Despite being born in Ljubljana, capital city of Slovenia, since 2008 he is member of Bosnia and Herzegovina national under-21 football team.

== Career statistics ==
As of 15 May 2016

Club statistics
Season	Club	League	League		Cup		League Cup		Other		Total	
Season	Club	League	App	Goals	App	Goals	App	Goals	App	Goals	App	Goals
2010–11	Olimpik Sarajevo	Premijer Liga	12	1	2	0	—		—		14	1
2011–12	Olimpik Sarajevo	Premijer Liga	13	0	0	0	—		—		13	0
2011–12	Hapoel Be'er Sheva	Israeli Premier League	16	0	0	0	0	0	—		16	0
2012–13	Debreceni	Nemzeti Bajnokság I	0	0	2	0	2	0	—		4	0
2012–13	Simurq	Azerbaijan Premier League	11	0	2	0	—		—		13	0
2013–14	Simurq	Azerbaijan Premier League	17	0	1	0	—		—		18	0
2014–15	Sloboda Tuzla	Premijer Liga	20	1	0	0	—		—		20	1
2015–16	Sloboda Tuzla	Premijer Liga	10	0	3	0	—		—		13	0
2015–16	Borac Banja Luka	Premijer Liga	12	0	0	0	—		—		12	0
Total	Bosnia and Herzegovina		67	2	5	0	0	0	0	0	72	2
Total	Israel		16	0	0	0	0	0	0	0	16	0
Total	Hungary		0	0	2	0	2	0	0	0	4	0
Total	Azerbaijan		28	0	3	0	0	0	0	0	31	0
Total			111	2	10	0	2	0	0	0	123	2
