= Zdravko Popović =

Croatian footballer

Personal information
- Date of birth: 2 January 1983 (age 43)
- Place of birth: Zagreb, Croatia
- Height: 1.78 m (5 ft 10 in)
- Position: Striker

Youth career
- NK Zagreb

Senior career*
Years	Team	Apps	(Gls)
2000–2004	NK Zagreb	18	(1)
2001–2002	→ Samobor (loan)		
2005–2007	Croatia Sesvete	62	(51)
2007–2010	OFI	73	(22)
2009	→ Atromitos (loan)	5	(1)
2010–2012	Levadiakos	53	(8)
2012–2013	Simurq	27	(5)
2013–2014	AEK Athens	15	(4)
2015	Balmazújvárosi	12	(2)
2015–2016	OFI	0	(0)
2016–2017	Apollon Kalamarias	25	(23)
2017–2018	Ialysos	0	(0)
2018–2019	Marko	4	(0)
- * Club domestic league appearances and goals as of 6 July 2017

Zdravko Popović (born 2 January 1983) is a Croatian former football player who played as forward.

== Club career ==
Popović joined AEK Athens in the summer of 2013, signing a 2-year contract, after playing for Simurq PFC in Azerbaijan Premier League.

His former clubs include NK Zagreb, NK Croatia Sesvete, OFI and Levadiakos. He led Croatia Sesvete in goal-scoring in both of his seasons with the club, notching a total of 51 goals.

== Career statistics ==
As of 30 June 2014

Club performance			League		Cup		Continental		Total	
Season	Club	League	Apps	Goals	Apps	Goals	Apps	Goals	Apps	Goals
Azerbaijan			League		Azerbaijan Cup		Europe		Total	
2012-13	Simurq	Azerbaijan Premier League	28	6	3	0	0	0	31	6
Total	Azerbaijan		28	6	3	0	0	0	31	6
Greece			League		Gamma Ethniki Cup		Europe		Total	
2013-14	AEK Athens	Football League 2	15	4	2	1	0	0	17	5
Total	Greece		15	4	2	1	0	0	17	5
Career total			43	10	5	1	0	0	48	11

== Honours ==
AEK Athens

- Football League 2: 2013–14 (6th Group)
