= Anderson do Ó =

Brazilian footballer (born 1980)

Personal information
- Full name: Anderson Oliveira Almeid
- Date of birth: December 14, 1980 (age 45)
- Place of birth: Rio de Janeiro, Brazil
- Height: 1.90 m (6 ft 3 in)
- Position: Defender

Senior career*
Years	Team	Apps	(Gls)
2003	Madureira		
2004	Ceará		
2004	Blooming		
2005	Madureira		
2005	Vasco da Gama	4	(0)
2005–2008	Levadiakos	55	(1)
2008–2009	Vitória Setúbal	11	(1)
2009–2010	AEP Paphos	19	(1)
2010–2012	Vitória Setúbal	34	(3)
2012	Vaslui	14	(0)
2012–2014	Simurq	59	(1)
- * Club domestic league appearances and goals as of 2 February 2017

Anderson Oliveira Almeida (born December 14, 1980), commonly known as Anderson do Ó, is a retired Brazilian footballer.

== Simurq ==
In July 2013 signed a new 1-year contract with Simurq.

== Career statistics ==
As of 13 May 2014

Club performance			League		Cup		League Cup		Continental		Total	
Season	Club	League	Apps	Goals	Apps	Goals	Apps	Goals	Apps	Goals	Apps	Goals
2010-11	Vitória	Primeira Liga	18	1	0	0	1	0	0	0	19	1
2011-12	Vitória	Primeira Liga	16	1	0	0	4	0	0	0	20	1
2011-12	Vaslui	Liga I	14	0	3	0	-		0	0	17	0
2012-13	Simurq	Azerbaijan Premier League	27	0	3	0	-		-		30	0
2013-14	Simurq	Azerbaijan Premier League	32	1	1	0	-		-		33	1
Total	Portugal		34	2	0	0	5	0	0	0	39	2
Total	Romania		14	0	3	0	-		0	0	17	0
Total	Azerbaijan		59	1	4	0	-		0	0	62	1
Career total			107	3	7	0	5	0	0	0	119	3
