= Mario Božić =

Bosnian footballer (1983–2023)

Mario Božić Марио Божић
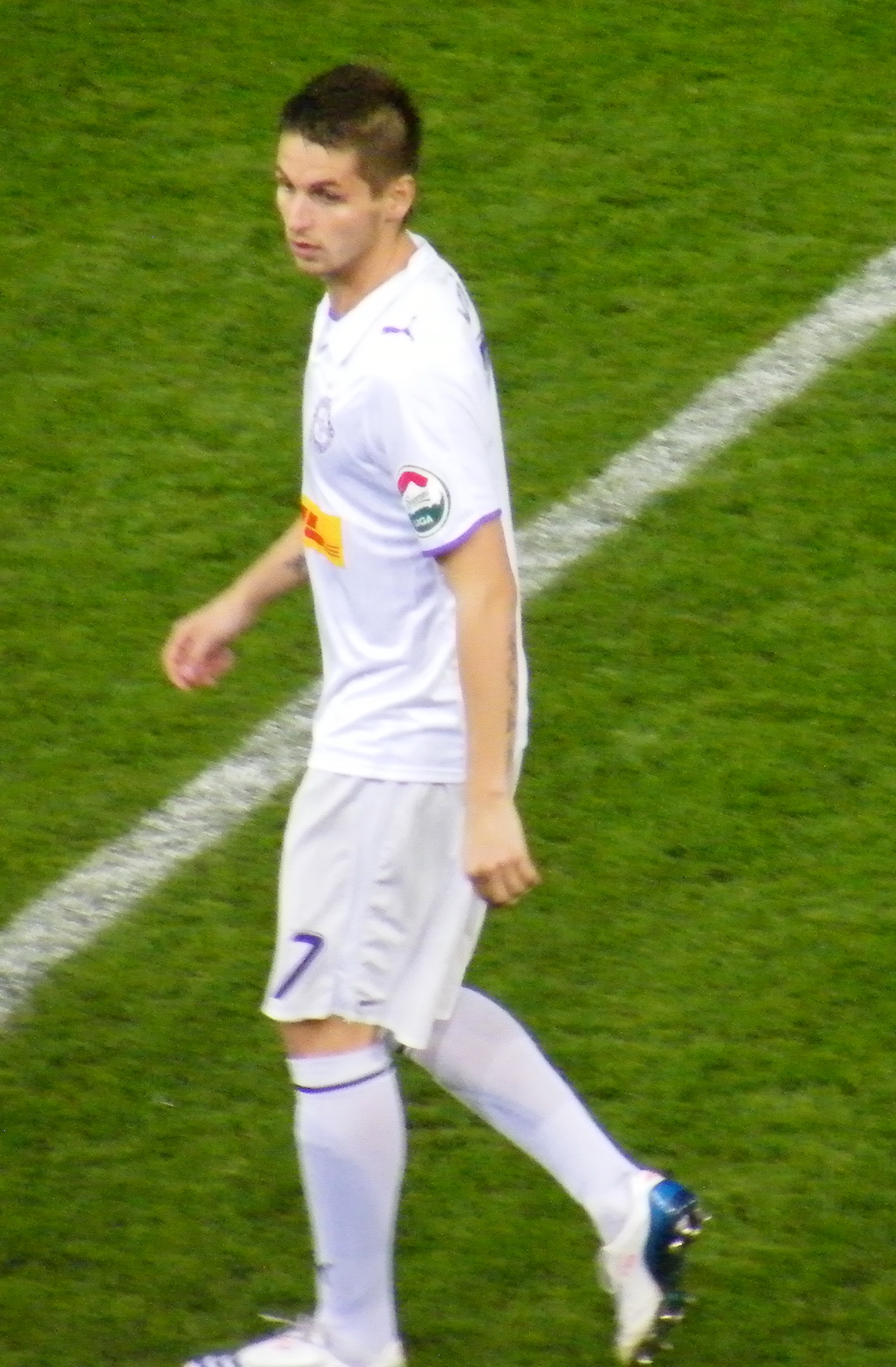
- Božić with Újpest in 2008

Personal information
- Date of birth: 25 May 1983
- Place of birth: Tuzla, SR Bosnia and Herzegovina, SFR Yugoslavia
- Date of death: 3 April 2023 (aged 39)
- Height: 1.80 m (5 ft 11 in)
- Position: Midfielder

Senior career*
Years	Team	Apps	(Gls)
2001–2002	Loznica	34	(3)
2003	Radnički Stobex	12	(2)
2003–2004	Beograd	27	(1)
2004–2007	Videoton Fehérvár	86	(11)
2008–2009	Újpest	40	(4)
2009–2011	Slovan Bratislava	50	(3)
2011	Ashdod	0	(0)
2012	Borac Čačak	0	(0)
2012	Shanghai Shenhua	13	(0)
2012–2013	Simurq	25	(6)
2013	Panachaiki	10	(3)
2014	Voždovac	11	(1)
2014–2015	Borac Čačak	15	(1)
2015–2016	Loznica	13	(0)

International career
2007–2008	Bosnia and Herzegovina	2	(0)
- * Club domestic league appearances and goals

Mario Božić (Serbian Cyrillic: Марио Божић, pronounced [mâːrio bǒːʒitɕ]; 25 May 1983 – 3 April 2023) was a Bosnian Serb professional footballer who played as a central midfielder.

At international level, Božić made two appearances for Bosnia and Herzegovina between 2007 and 2008.

== Club career ==
Born in Tuzla, Božić moved to Serbia at an early age and started his senior career with Loznica. He also played for Radnički Stobex and Beograd, before moving to Hungarian club Fehérvár in the summer of 2004. As a regular member of the first team, Božić helped them win the 2005–06 Magyar Kupa. He also made over 100 appearances for the club in all competitions. In the 2008 winter transfer window, Božić was transferred to Újpest. He spent a total of five years in the country, amassing 126 league appearances and scoring 15 goals.

In the summer of 2009, Božić moved to Slovakia and signed with Slovan Bratislava. He spent two seasons in the country and won four major trophies with the club.

In June 2011, Božić signed with Israeli club Ashdod, but failed to make any appearance for the club. He returned to Serbia in the 2012 winter transfer window and surprisingly signed with Borac Čačak. However, after only a few weeks, Božić left the club without making his debut and moved to Chinese side Shanghai Shenhua.

In August 2012, Božić joined Azerbaijani club Simurq, becoming the club's top scorer with six goals in the 2012–13 season.

Božić ended his career by playing with FK Loznica in Serbian second league.

== International career ==
In March 2007, Božić received his first call-up for the Bosnia and Herzegovina national team. He made his international debut on 8 September 2007, coming on as a substitute for Darko Maletić in a 1–0 loss to Hungary. His second and final international was an August 2008 friendly match against Bulgaria.

== Post-playing career ==
On 9 February 2017, Božić was appointed director of football at Loznica.

== Death ==
Božić died on 3 April 2023 from a brain tumor. He was 39 years old.

== Career statistics ==
Appearances and goals by club, season and competition
Club	Season	League			Cup (Note: Includes Magyar Kupa, Slovak Cup, FA Cup, Azerbaijan Cup)		Continental		Total	
Club	Season	Division	Apps	Goals	Apps	Goals	Apps	Goals	Apps	Goals
Fehérvár	2004–05	NB I	20	0			0	0	20	0
Fehérvár	2005–06	NB I	28	6			0	0	28	6
Fehérvár	2006–07	NB I	24	2			4	0	28	2
Fehérvár	2007–08	NB I	14	3			0	0	14	3
Fehérvár	Total		86	11			4	0	90	11
Újpest	2007–08	NB I	13	0			0	0	13	0
Újpest	2008–09	NB I	27	4			0	0	27	4
Újpest	Total		40	4			0	0	40	4
Slovan Bratislava	2009–10	Slovak Super Liga	26	0	5	1	5	0	36	1
Slovan Bratislava	2010–11	Slovak Super Liga	24	3	4	0	3	0	31	3
Slovan Bratislava	Total		50	3	9	1	8	0	67	4
Shanghai Shenhua	2012	Chinese Super League	13	0	1	0	0	0	14	0
Simurq	2012–13	Azerbaijan Premier League	25	6	3	0	0	0	28	6
Career total			214	24	13	1	12	0	239	25

== Honours ==
Fehérvár

- Magyar Kupa: 2005–06

Slovan Bratislava

- Slovak Super Liga: 2010–11
- Slovak Cup: 2009–10, 2010–11
- Slovak Super Cup: 2009
