= Giorgi Chikhradze =

Georgian footballer (born 1967)

Personal information
- Date of birth: 1 October 1967 (age 59)
- Place of birth: Gagra, Georgia, former Soviet Union
- Height: 1.85 m (6 ft 1 in)
- Position: Defender

Senior career*
Years	Team	Apps	(Gls)
1983–1984	Dinamo Gagra		
1984–1986	Dinamo Tbilisi	0	(0)
1986–1989	Dinamo Sokhumi	93	(3)
1990–1992	Tskhumi Sokhumi	93	(1)
1993	Spartak Anapa	8	(0)
1993–1995	Temp Shepetivka	56	(2)
1995–1997	Shakhtar Donetsk	37	(1)
1997	→ Shakhtar-2 Donetsk	1	(0)
1997–1998	Dinamo Tbilisi	12	(0)
1998	Qianwei Huandao	10	(0)
1999–2000	Lokomotivi Tbilisi	34	(1)
2000–2002	Hapoel Beit She'an	67	(0)
2003–2004	Ameri Tbilisi	16	(0)
Total		377	(8)

International career
1994–2000	Georgia	24	(0)

Managerial career
- 2005–2009: Ameri Tbilisi
- 2011–2015: Simurq
- 2015–2017: Ameri Tbilisi
- 2017–2018: Ethnikos Achna
- * Club domestic league appearances and goals

Giorgi Chikhradze (Georgian: გიორგი ჩიხრაძე; born 1 October 1967) is a Georgian football manager and former member of the Georgia national team.

Chikhradze played club football for Dinamo Sokhumi in the Soviet Second League and Spartak Anapa in the Russian First League.

Chikhradze made 24 appearances for the Georgia national team from 1994 to 2000.
