= Stjepan Poljak =

Croatian footballer (born 1983)

Personal information
- Date of birth: 17 November 1983 (age 42)
- Place of birth: Zabok, SFR Yugoslavia
- Height: 1.80 m (5 ft 11 in)
- Position: Midfielder

Team information
- Current team: Zagorec Krapina
- Number: 15

Youth career
- 1996: Inker Zaprešić
- 1997–2002: Dinamo Zagreb

Senior career*
Years	Team	Apps	(Gls)
2002–2006	Inter Zaprešić	63	(8)
2006–2008	Slaven Belupo	50	(10)
2008–2010	Eskişehirspor	29	(0)
2010–2012	Slaven Belupo	54	(2)
2012–2015	Simurq	88	(11)
2015	Inter Baku	14	(0)
2016	Zagorec Krapina		
2016–2017	Vinogradar		
2017–	Zagorec Krapina		

International career
1999	Croatia U17	3	(0)
- * Club domestic league appearances and goals

Stjepan Poljak (born 17 November 1983) is a Croatian professional footballer who plays as a midfielder for NK Zagorec Krapina.

== Career ==
Poljak was born in Zabok, Croatia, SFR Yugoslavia.

He signed a three-year contract with Süper Lig club Eskişehirspor in July 2008.

In July 2012 Poljak signed a two-year contract with Azerbaijan Premier League side Simurq. Poljak made his debut on 4 August 2012 in a 1–1 draw at home to Gabala, playing the full 90 minutes. His first goal for Simurq came in a 2–0 away victory over Khazar Lankaran on 20 September 2012, finishing the season with 4 goals in 29 league games. Poljak signed a new one-year contract, with the option of a second year, with Simurq during the summer of 2014.

== Career statistics ==
As of match played 20 December 2015

Appearances and goals by club, season and competition
Club	Season	League			National cup		Continental		Total	
Club	Season	Division	Apps	Goals	Apps	Goals	Apps	Goals	Apps	Goals
Inter Zaprešić	2003–04	1. HNL	9	0			–		9	0
Inter Zaprešić	2004–05	1. HNL	23	4			–		23	4
Inter Zaprešić	2005–06	1. HNL	24	1			2	0	26	1
Inter Zaprešić	Total		56	5			2	0	58	5
Slaven Belupo	2006–07	1. HNL	19	2			–		19	2
Slaven Belupo	2007–08	1. HNL	31	8			4	1	35	9
Slaven Belupo	2008–09	1. HNL	0	0	0	0	1	0	1	0
Slaven Belupo	Total		50	10			5	1	55	11
Eskişehirspor	2008–09	Süper Lig	29	0	3	0	–		32	0
Slaven Belupo	2010–11	1. HNL	28	0	1	0	–		29	0
Slaven Belupo	2011–12	1. HNL	26	2	4	0	–		30	2
Slaven Belupo	Total		54	2	5	0	0	0	59	2
Simurq	2012–13	Azerbaijan Premier League	29	4	2	0	–		31	4
Simurq	2013–14	Azerbaijan Premier League	35	7	1	0	–		36	7
Simurq	2014–15	Azerbaijan Premier League	24	0	5	1	–		29	1
Simurq	Total		88	11	8	1	0	0	96	12
Inter Baku	2015–16	Azerbaijan Premier League	14	0	1	0	3	0	18	0
Career total			283	28	13	1	10	1	306	30
