= Zaqatala City Stadium =

Zaqatala, Azerbaijan

Coordinates: 41°38′22″N 46°39′10″E

Zaqatala "Simurq" stadium
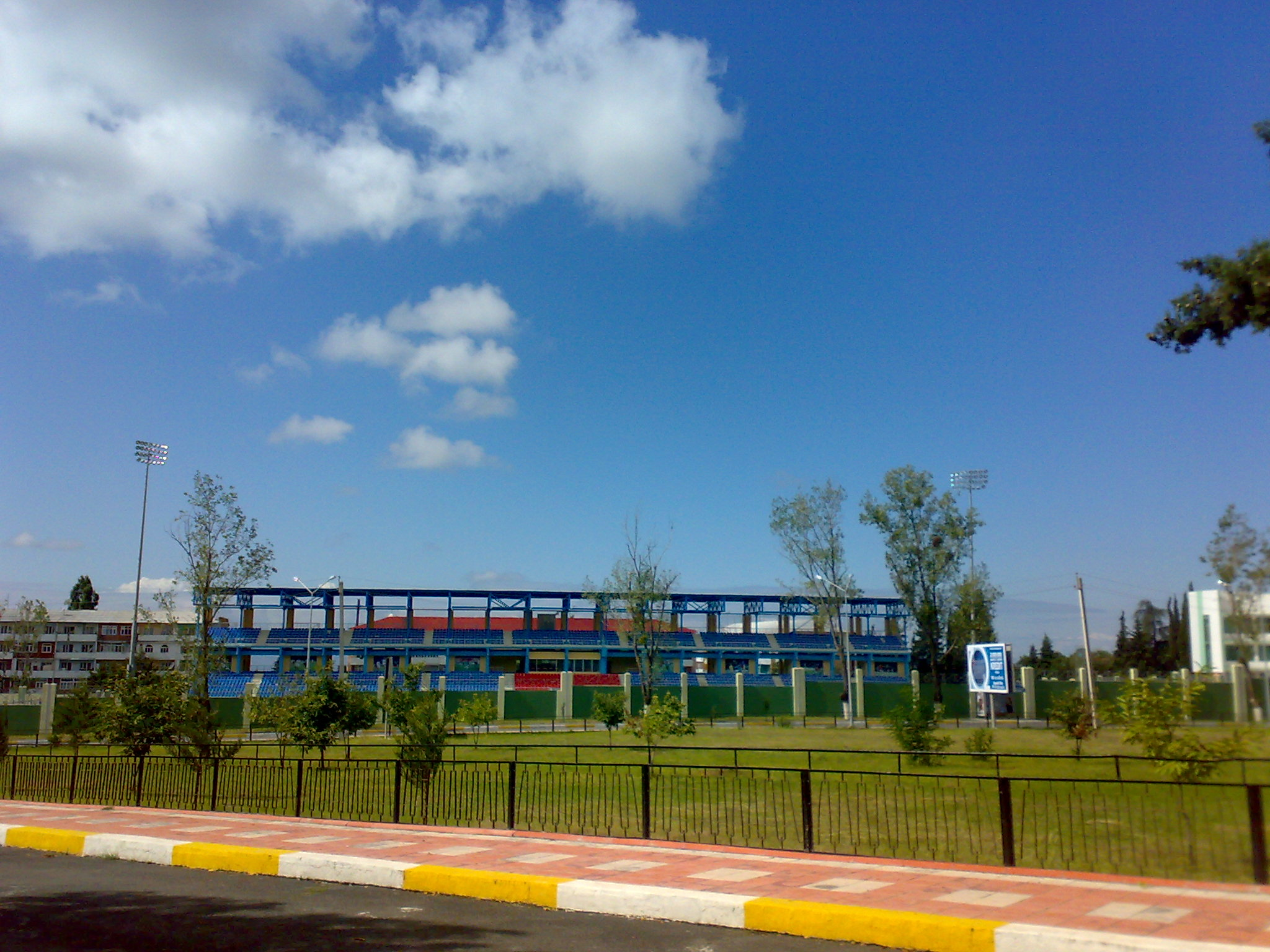
- Interactive map of Zaqatala "Simurq" stadium
- Full name: Zaqatala "Simurq" Stadium
- Location: Zaqatala, Azerbaijan
- Owner: FK Simurq Zaqatala
- Operator: (Bulgaria) Dynamic Sport
- Capacity: 3,500
- Surface: Artificial field
- Field size: 105x68

Construction
- Built: 2008
- Cost: US$12 million
- Architects: "Khazar" center of scientific and technical creativity of youth

Tenant
- FK Simurq Zaqatala

Zaqatala "Simurq" is a multi-use stadium in Zaqatala, Azerbaijan. It is primarily used for football matches and has been the home ground of FK Simurq Zaqatala since October 2008.

The stadium was built in the area of Galadyuzyu in place of the old arena. The total area is 2.3 hectares. The draft was prepared by the Bulgarian "Dynamic Resource", commissioned by the company "General Constructions". The work took place from 2006 to August 2008. At its construction has been spent around US$12 million. The stadium holds 3500 spectators, one-sided platform for VIP-guests, calculated at 181. The main field consists of 105×68 meters of artificial surface, several small training lawns, artificial lighting, drainage and a modern electronic street system, a running track, ticketing, accessible spaces for people with disabilities, a large heating system, and a water reservoir with a volume of 300 cubic meters.

The first floor of building is only for teams and judges. There are rooms for each team, doctors and massage rooms, a laboratory for doping tests, and the press center. On the second floor there are internet cafes, bars, VIP bar, and on the third floor there are seats for the press.
