= Simurq PIK =

Simurq
- Full name: Simurq Peşəkar İdman Klubu
- Nickname: Simurqlar (The Phoenixes)
- Founded: 2005; 21 years ago
- Dissolved: 2015; 11 years ago
- Ground: Zaqatala City Stadium, Zaqatala, Azerbaijan
- Capacity: 3,500
- League: Azerbaijan Premier League
- 2014–15: 5th
- Website: www.simurqpfk.az
Home colours	Away colours

Simurq Peşəkar İdman Klubu (lit. 'Simurg Professional Sports Club') was an Azerbaijani football club based in Zaqatala, that competed in the Azerbaijan Premier League. The club was known as Simurq Peşəkar Futbol Klubu (lit. 'Simurg Professional Football Club') until June 2013.

== History ==
=== Early years (2005–2009) ===
The club was founded in 2005 and participated in the Azerbaijan First Division. The club's first season was very successful, and in the 2006–07 season, the club was participating in the Azerbaijan Premier League. After its debut season in the Premier League, Simurq finished 9th out of 14 clubs.

The Azerbaijani magazine Football+ recognized Simurq as the “Surprise of the Year" of the 2006–07 season based on polling results. The club finished the 2007–08 season in 7th place. The club gained third place in Azerbaijan Premier League 2008-09 by making the best indicator of the team in its history.

=== Recent years (2009–2015) ===
In 2009, the club's debut in European competitions was not very successful, as they were eliminated in the 1st qualifying round of the UEFA Europa League by Bnei Yehuda. The 2009–10 season for the club was not successful, even though the team had a good start before the winter break. After the winter, the club began to fall in the standings and won only 8th place, while coach Roman Pokora dismissed after a string of poor results.

In June 2010, the club's executive director, former Azerbaijan national football team manager Gjoko Hadžievski became the club's new coach. However, due to financial problems Simurq could not sign big local and foreign players and coach staff was forced to take less experienced players and use from youth system. The 2010–11 season became the worst in club history as Simurq was relegated to the Azerbaijan First Division after finishing 11th place. However club is allowed participate in the next season to replace Mughan who had sponsorship problems.

On 18 July 2011, the club signed a contract with Sergey Yuran, former Ukrainian football player and association football coach. On 5 March 2012, after Sergey Yuran's resignation, Igor Getman became the first Azerbaijani manager to lead Simurq as caretaker until the end of the season. But after six days, the club announced Giorgi Chikhradze as their new coach. Simurq started 2012–13 season strongly, but after the start of the new year, team's form stumbled, hampering their European cup objective.

During the summer of 2015 the club folded due financial problems.

=== Domestic ===
As of 29 May 2015:

Season	League									Azerbaijan Cup	Top goalscorer	
Season	Div.	Pos.	Pl.	W	D	L	GS	GA	P	Azerbaijan Cup	Name	League
2005–06	2nd	3	30	19	8	3	67	14	65	1st Round		
2006–07	1st	9	24	6	7	11	27	33	25	1/8 Finals	(Azerbaijan) Ramin Nasibov	9
2007–08	1st	7	26	9	9	8	31	25	36	1/8 Finals	(Ukraine) Volodymyr Mazyar	10
2008–09	1st	3	26	16	5	5	39	20	53	Quarter-Finals	(Ukraine) Volodymyr Mazyar	12
2009–10	1st	8	20	8	7	5	21	21	31	Quarter-Finals	(Ukraine) Ruslan Hunchak (Azerbaijan) Elshan Mammadov	7
2010–11	1st	11	32	4	7	21	20	52	19	1/8 Finals	(Georgia (country)) Bachana Tskhadadze	5
2011–12	1st	9	32	8	10	14	27	41	34	First Round	(Lithuania) Robertas Poškus	8
2012–13	1st	4	32	12	12	8	32	26	48	Quarter finals	(Bosnia and Herzegovina) Mario Božić	6
2013–14	1st	7	36	11	13	12	35	28	46	Second round	(Serbia) Dragan Ćeran	13
2014–15	1st	5	32	11	6	15	41	39	39	Semifinal	(Serbia) Dragan Ćeran	14

=== European ===
Competition	Matches	W	D	L	GF	GA
UEFA Europa League	2	0	0	2	0	4
Total	2	0	0	2	0	4

Season	Competition	Round	Country	Club	Home	Away	Aggregate
2009–10	UEFA Europa League	1Q	(Israel)	Bnei Yehuda	0–1	0–3	0–4

== Stadium ==
Zaqatala City Stadium
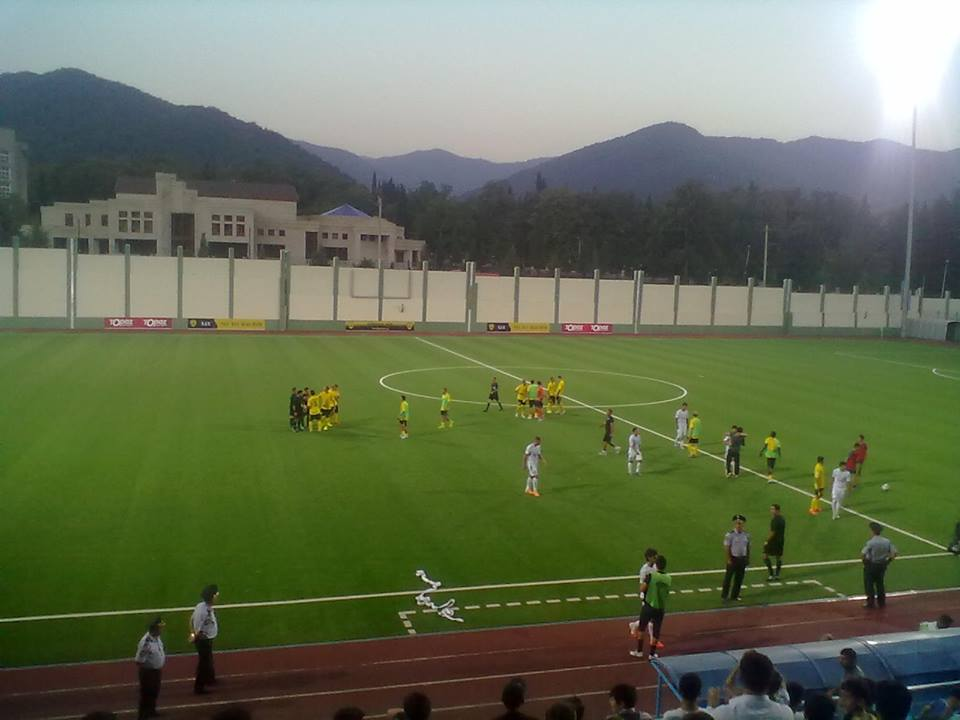
- Location: Zaqatala, Azerbaijan
- Owner: Simurq
- Operator: (Bulgaria) Dynamic Resource
- Capacity: 3,500 seated

Construction
- Groundbreaking: 2006
- Opened: August 2008
- Cost: $12 million
- Architects: "Khazar" center of scientific and technical creativity of youth

Tenant
- Simurq (2008–present)

Zaqatala City Stadium is a football stadium in Zagatala, Azerbaijan. It is currently used as club's home stadium and holds 3,500 people.

== Crest and colours ==
Since the club's foundation, Simurq have had only one crest. It was officially adopted for the start of the 2006–07 season and based on a mythical sacred Phoenix firebird with castle background. It stems from the club's name Simurq, which means Phoenix in Azerbaijani language. The new home and away kits were unveiled in June 2013 for the 2013–2014 season. The home kit is black and yellow stripes and the away kit is white, with Joma being the kit manufacturer.

In 2013, the club unveiled an official crest, designed by Azerbaijani graphic designer Elnur Sharifli from Poland.

== Supporters ==
Simurq has a large fanbase in relation to its comparative lack of success on the pitch. Simurq supporters have played a vital role in the club's long term stay at Zaqatala.

== Managers ==
As of Match played 28 February 2014

Name	Managerial Tenure	P	W	D	L	Win %
(Ukraine) Anatoliy Piskovets	2005–2006	0	0	0	0	0
(Ukraine) Viktor Pyshev	2006	0	0	0	0	0
(Ukraine) Roman Pokora	2006 – 18 June 2010	124	51	35	38	41.13
(North Macedonia) Gjoko Hadžievski	18 June 2010 – 19 July 2011	33	4	8	21	12.12
(Russia) Sergei Yuran	19 July 2011 – 5 March 2012	22	5	4	13	22.73
(Azerbaijan) Igor Getman (caretaker)	5 March 2012 – 11 March 2013	2	0	1	1	0
(Georgia (country)) Giorgi Chikhradze	11 March 2012 – June 2015	118	40	39	39	33.9
