= 2013–14 FK Khazar Lankaran season =

Khazar Lankaran
2013–14 season
- President: Mubariz Mansimov
- Manager: John Toshack until 22 November 2013; Giovanni Melchiorre Caretaker; 25 November - 3 December 2013; Mustafa Denizli; 3 December 2013 - 16 May 2014
- Stadium: Lankaran City Stadium
- Premier League: 6th
- Azerbaijan Cup: Semifinals vs Gabala
- Azerbaijan Supercup: Champions
- Europa League: 2nd Qualifying Round vs Maccabi Haifa
- Top goalscorer: League: Mbilla Etame (11); All: Mbilla Etame (15)
- Highest home attendance: 11,055 vs Sliema Wanderers; 2 July 2013
- Lowest home attendance: 2,000 vs Inter Baku; 28 February 2014
- Average home league attendance: 6,586; 3 April 2014
Home colours	Away colours

The Khazar Lankaran 2013-14 season is Khazar Lankaran's ninth Azerbaijan Premier League season. It is their first full season with John Toshack as manager. They started the season by competing in the 2013–14 UEFA Europa League, reaching the 2nd qualifying round, after defeating Sliema Wanderers, before losing 0-10 on aggregate to Maccabi Haifa. As runners up in the previous season Azerbaijan Cup, Khazar took part in the revamped Azerbaijan Supercup, emerging victorious against Neftchi Baku. They currently taking part in the 2013–14 Azerbaijan Cup and 2013–14 Azerbaijan Premier League.

After a poor start to the season, in which Khazar only picked up 14 points from 14 games, Toshack resigned from his post following their 3-0 defeat to Baku on 22 November 2013. Giovanni Melkiorrenin was placed in temporary charge with Mustafa Denizli taking over on 3 December 2013, on a 1.5 year contract. On 16 May 2014, Denizli had his contract with Khazar mutually terminated.

== Squad ==
As of 14 February 2014

Note: Flags indicate national team as defined under FIFA eligibility rules; some limited exceptions apply. Players may hold more than one non-FIFA nationality.

No.	Pos.	Nation	Player
1	GK	AZE	Orkhan Sadigli
2	DF	AZE	Slavik Alkhasov
3	DF	BRA	Vanderson
4	DF	PHI	Álvaro Silva
5	DF	BRA	Thiego
6	DF	AZE	Rasim Ramaldanov
7	MF	MLI	Sadio Tounkara
8	MF	MKD	Dejan Blaževski
10	MF	AZE	Elnur Abdullayev
11	MF	MAR	Zouhir Benouahi

No.	Pos.	Nation	Player
12	FW	BRA	Nildo
14	MF	AZE	Rahid Amirguliyev (captain)
16	MF	ROU	Adrian Piț
18	MF	AZE	Tural Jalilov
19	GK	CRO	Vjekoslav Tomić
20	FW	CMR	Mbilla Etame
22	MF	BRA	Deyvid Sacconi
23	MF	MKD	Nikola Gligorov
27	DF	ROU	Adrian Scarlatache
30	MF	BRA	Elias

=== Out on loan ===
Note: Flags indicate national team as defined under FIFA eligibility rules; some limited exceptions apply. Players may hold more than one non-FIFA nationality.

No. / Pos. / Nation / Player; 9 / MF / AZE / Ugur Pamuk (at Sumgayit)	No. / Pos. / Nation / Player

=== Reserve ===
Note: Flags indicate national team as defined under FIFA eligibility rules; some limited exceptions apply. Players may hold more than one non-FIFA nationality.

No.	Pos.	Nation	Player
9	FW	AZE	Orkhan Aliyev
17	MF	AZE	Kazim Kazimli
25	GK	AZE	Tarlan Qasımzade (loan from MOIK Baku)
42	MF	AZE	Kamran Abdullazade (loan from MOIK Baku)
55	FW	AZE	Aghabala Ramazanov
97	FW	AZE	Elnur Ceferov

No.	Pos.	Nation	Player

== Transfers ==
=== Summer ===
In: Note: Flags indicate national team as defined under FIFA eligibility rules; some limited exceptions apply. Players may hold more than one non-FIFA nationality.

No.	Pos.	Nation	Player
6	DF	AZE	Rasim Ramaldanov (from (Azerbaijan) Simurq)
8	MF	ESP	Eduard Oriol (from (Spain) Real Zaragoza)
11	MF	MAR	Zouhir Benouahi (from (Azerbaijan) AZAL)
12	FW	BRA	Nildo (from (Azerbaijan) AZAL)
18	MF	AZE	Tural Jalilov (from (Azerbaijan) Ravan Baku)
20	FW	CMR	Mbilla Etame (from (Turkey) Adanaspor)
22	MF	BRA	Deyvid Sacconi (from (Brazil) Bragantino)
23	MF	MKD	Nikola Gligorov (from (Cyprus) Alki Larnaca)
25	GK	AZE	Tarlan Qasımzade (loan from (Azerbaijan) MOIK Baku)
33	GK	BRA	Douglas (from (Brazil) Criciúma)
42	MF	AZE	Kamran Abdullazadeh (loan from (Azerbaijan) MOIK Baku)

Out: Note: Flags indicate national team as defined under FIFA eligibility rules; some limited exceptions apply. Players may hold more than one non-FIFA nationality.

No.	Pos.	Nation	Player
5	DF	AZE	Elnur Allahverdiyev (loan to (Azerbaijan) Gabala)
8	DF	BRA	Éder Bonfim
11	FW	GRE	Dimitris Sialmas (to (Greece) Platanias)
16	MF	ROU	Adrian Piț
24	FW	TUR	Gökhan Güleç (to (Turkey) İnegölspor)
30	GK	ESP	Toni Doblas
35	FW	ARG	Luciano Olguín (to (Argentina) Aldosivi)
99	MF	CRO	Marin Oršulić (to (Croatia) NK Zadar)

=== Winter ===
In: Note: Flags indicate national team as defined under FIFA eligibility rules; some limited exceptions apply. Players may hold more than one non-FIFA nationality.

No.	Pos.	Nation	Player
2	DF	AZE	Slavik Alkhasov (from (Azerbaijan) Neftchi Baku)
5	DF	BRA	Thiego (from (Brazil) Figueirense)
8	MF	MKD	Dejan Blaževski (from (North Macedonia) Turnovo)
9	FW	AZE	Orkhan Aliyev (from (Azerbaijan) Sumgayit)
16	MF	ROU	Adrian Piț (Resigned)
19	GK	CRO	Vjekoslav Tomić (from (Moldova) Sheriff Tiraspol)
30	MF	BRA	Elias (from (Brazil) Atlético Paranaense)

Out: Note: Flags indicate national team as defined under FIFA eligibility rules; some limited exceptions apply. Players may hold more than one non-FIFA nationality.

No.	Pos.	Nation	Player
5	MF	AZE	Elnur Allahverdiyev (to (Azerbaijan) Gabala)
8	MF	ESP	Eduard Oriol (to (Cyprus) AEL Limassol)
9	MF	AZE	Uğur Pamuk (on loan to (Azerbaijan) Sumgayit)
17	MF	AZE	Kazım Kazımlı (Reserve)
21	DF	BUL	Radomir Todorov (to (Bulgaria) Spartak Varna)
33	GK	BRA	Douglas (to (Brazil) Guarani)
97	FW	AZE	Elnur Cafarov (Reserve)

== Competitions ==
=== Friendlies ===
28 June 2013	Khazar Lankaran (Azerbaijan)	6 – 1	(Germany) Ingolstadt	Austria
21:00 AZST (UTC+5)	Nildo 10'; Scarlatache 32'; Benouahi 33', 52'; Pamuk 76'; E.Jafarov 78'	Summary	57'

14 January 2014	Khazar Lankaran (Azerbaijan)	0 – 0	(Turkey) Çaykur Rizespor	Antalya, Turkey
AZT (UTC+4)		Summary

18 January 2014	Khazar Lankaran (Azerbaijan)	0 – 2	(Turkey) Gençlerbirliği	Antalya, Turkey
13:00 AZT (UTC+4)		[ Summary]

=== Azerbaijan Supercup ===
23 October 2013	Khazar Lankaran	2 – 1	Neftchi Baku	Nakhchivan City
15:00 AZST (UTC+5)	Etame 27'; Tounkara (yellow card) 26' (yellow-red card) 64'; Ramaldanov 27'	Summary	Cardoso 68'	Stadium: Nakhchivan City Stadium; Attendance: 9,800; Referee: Rahim Hasanov

=== Azerbaijan Premier League ===
==== Results summary ====
Overall								Home						Away					
Pld	W	D	L	GF	GA	GD	Pts	W	D	L	GF	GA	GD	W	D	L	GF	GA	GD
36	11	13	12	42	49	−7	46	6	7	5	22	20	+2	5	6	7	20	29	−9

Last updated: 18 May 2014.
Source: Soccerway

==== Results by round ====
Round	1	2	3	4	5	6	7	8	9	10	11	12	13	14	15	16	17	18	19	20	21	22	23	24	25	26	27	28	29	30	31	32	33	34	35	36
Ground	A	H	A	H	A	H	A	H	A	A	H	A	H	A	H	A	H	H	A	H	A	H	A	H	A	A	H	A	H	A	H	A	H	H	A	H
Result	D	D	L	D	L	W	W	L	D	W	L	L	D	L	D	D	W	W	W	D	W	L	D	D	L	W	L	L	W	D	D	L	W	W	D	W
Position	5	6	7	9	9	7	7	7	8	6	8	8	8	8	8	8	8	8	8	6	6	6	6	6	7	7	7	7	7	7	7	7	7	6	6	6

Source: Soccerway
A = Away; H = Home; W = Win; D = Draw; L = Loss

==== Results ====
4 August 2013 1	Sumgayit	1 – 1	Khazar Lankaran	Sumgayit
18:30 AZST (UTC+5)	V.Asgarov 41'	Summary	Nildo 64'	Stadium: Mehdi Huseynzade Stadium; Attendance: 5,000; Referee: Rauf Jabbarov

11 August 2013 2	Khazar Lankaran	0 – 0	Simurq	Lankaran
20:00 AZST (UTC+5)		Summary		Stadium: Lankaran City Stadium; Attendance: 7,000; Referee: Fariz Yusifov

18 August 2013 3	Qarabağ	2 – 0	Khazar Lankaran	Baku
20:00 AZST (UTC+5)	Gelashvili 26'; Richard 61' (pen.)	Summary		Stadium: Bakcell Arena^{2} Attendance: 3,000; Referee: Rahim Häsänov

25 August 2013 4	Khazar Lankaran	0 – 0	Neftchi Baku	Lankaran
20:00 AZST (UTC+5)		Summary		Stadium: Lankaran City Stadium; Attendance: 10,000; Referee: Fariz Yusifov

31 August 2013 5	Gabala	2 – 0	Khazar Lankaran	Qabala
18:00 AZST (UTC+5)	Leonardo 39'; Ebecilio 61'	Summary		Stadium: Gabala City Stadium; Attendance: 1,200; Referee: Vusal Äliyev

14 September 2013 6	Khazar Lankaran	2 – 1	Baku	Lankaran
19:00 AZST (UTC+5)	Mbilla 30', 47'	Summary	Kalonas 7'	Stadium: Lankaran City Stadium; Attendance: 7,100; Referee: Ramil Diniyev

22 September 2013 7	AZAL	1 – 3	Khazar Lankaran	Baku
19:00 AZST (UTC+5)	Tagiyev 10'; Kļava (red card) 45+1'	Summary	Sacconi 3'; Nildo 68', 76'	Stadium: AZAL Arena; Attendance: 2,500; Referee: Vusal Äliyev

27 September 2013 8	Khazar Lankaran	0 – 1	Inter Baku	Lankaran
19:00 AZST (UTC+5)		Summary	Špičić 10'	Stadium: Lankaran City Stadium; Attendance: 6,500; Referee: Orkhan Mämmädov

4 October 2013 9	Ravan Baku	1 – 1	Khazar Lankaran	Baku
18:00 AZST (UTC+5)	Suvonkulov 18'	Summary	Nildo 75'	Stadium: Bayil Stadium; Attendance: 1,000; Referee: Elvin Äsgärov

19 October 2013 10	Simurq	1 – 2	Khazar Lankaran	Zaqatala
17:00 AZST (UTC+5)	Gurbanov 7'; Weitzman (yellow card) 54' (yellow-red card) 79'	Summary	A.Ramazanov 53'; Scarlatache 64'	Stadium: Zaqatala City Stadium; Attendance: 1,200; Referee: Rauf Jabbarov

27 October 2013 11	Khazar Lankaran	0 – 3	Qarabağ	Lankaran
19:00 AZT (UTC+4)		Summary	Reynaldo 22', 64'; Gelashvili 75'	Stadium: Lankaran City Stadium; Attendance: 7,500; Referee: Vusal Äliyev

2 November 2013 12	Neftchi Baku	4 – 1	Khazar Lankaran	Baku
19:00 AZT (UTC+4)	Nasimov 45'; Shukurov 65' (pen.); Nfor 90'; Flavinho 90+3'	Summary	Etame 90+1'	Stadium: Bakcell Arena; Attendance: 2,000; Referee: Orkhan Mämmädov

10 November 2013 13	Khazar Lankaran	0 – 0	Gabala	Lankaran
18:00 AZST (UTC+5)		Summary		Stadium: Lankaran City Stadium; Attendance: 4,000; Referee: Vusal Äliyev

22 November 2013 14	Baku	3 – 0	Khazar Lankaran	Baku
14:00 AZST (UTC+5)	Huseynov 66'; Ristović 70'; Kalonas 83'	Summary		Stadium: Tofik Bakhramov Stadium; Attendance: 300; Referee: Aliyar Ağayev

30 November 2013 15	Khazar Lankaran	1 – 1	AZAL	Lankaran
17:00 AZT (UTC+4)	Abdullayev 36'; A.Ramazanov (red card) 85'	Summary	Barlay 22'; Arsenijević (yellow card) 10' (yellow-red card) 55'	Stadium: Lankaran City Stadium; Attendance: 4,500; Referee: Rauf Jabbarov

8 December 2013 16	Inter Baku	0 – 0	Khazar Lankaran	Baku
17:00 AZT (UTC+4)		Summary		Stadium: Shafa Stadium; Attendance: 3,500; Referee: Aliyar Ağayev

15 December 2013 17	Khazar Lankaran	1 – 0	Ravan Baku	Lankaran
16:00 AZT (UTC+4)	Etame 27'	Summary		Stadium: Lankaran City Stadium; Attendance: 4,000; Referee: Rauf Jabbarov

20 December 2013 18	Khazar Lankaran	4 – 3	Sumgayit	Lankaran
15:00 AZT (UTC+4)	Tounkara 18'; Sacconi 26'; Etame 45+1', 51'	Summary	O.Aliyev 37'; Fardjad-Azad 80' (pen.); R.Nasirli 82'	Stadium: Lankaran City Stadium; Attendance: 3,000; Referee: Ramil Ähmädov

1 February 2014 19	Qarabağ	0 – 1	Khazar Lankaran	Baku
17:00 AZT (UTC+4)		Summary	Scarlatache 49'	Stadium: Bakcell Arena^{2} Attendance: 1,000; Referee: Ramil Diniyev

9 February 2014 20	Khazar Lankaran	2 – 2	Neftchi Baku	Lankaran
16:00 AZT (UTC+4)	Nildo 85'; Scarlatache 90+3'; A.Ramazanov (red card) 90+4'	Summary	Thiego 9' (o.g.); Abdullayev 52'; Guliyev (yellow card) 45+1' (yellow-red card) 89'; Cardoso (yellow card) 34' (red card) 90+4'; Bruno (red card) 90+4'	Stadium: Lankaran City Stadium; Attendance: 11,000; Referee: Rahim Häsänov

15 February 2014 21	Gabala	2 – 3	Khazar Lankaran	Qabala
15:00 AZT (UTC+4)	Subotić 26', 65'	Summary	Tounkara 51'; Etame 56', 84'	Stadium: Gabala City Stadium; Attendance: 2,800; Referee: Vusal Äliyev

19 February 2014 22	Khazar Lankaran	0 – 2	Baku	Lankaran
17:00 AZT (UTC+4)		Summary	Travner 70'; R.Aliyev 90+1'	Stadium: Lankaran City Stadium; Attendance: 9,500; Referee: Orkhan Mämmädov

23 February 2014 23	AZAL	2 – 2	Khazar Lankaran	Baku
17:00 AZT (UTC+4)	N.Turković 84'; Shemonayev (yellow card) 67' (yellow-red card) 90+1'; John 90+5' (pen.)	Summary	Nildo 22'; Abdullayev 48'	Stadium: AZAL Arena; Attendance: 2,000; Referee: Aliyar Ağayev

28 February 2014 24	Khazar Lankaran	1 – 1	Inter Baku	Lankaran
16:00 AZT (UTC+4)	Thiego 42'	Summary	Tskhadadze 32' (pen.)	Stadium: Lankaran City Stadium; Attendance: 2,000; Referee: Elvin Äsgärov

8 March 2014 25	Ravan Baku	2 – 1	Khazar Lankaran	Baku
15:00 AZT (UTC+4)	O.Lalayev 32'; Adamović 90+3'	Summary	Gligorov 12'	Stadium: Bayil Stadium; Attendance: 2,000; Referee: Omar Paşayev

16 March 2014 26	Sumgayit	0 – 1	Khazar Lankaran	Sumgayit
15:00 AZT (UTC+4)		Summary	Blaževski 65' (pen.)	Stadium: Mehdi Huseynzade Stadium; Attendance: 1,100; Referee: Alik Yunusov

23 March 2014 27	Khazar Lankaran	1 – 3	Simurq	Lankaran
16:00 AZT (UTC+4)	Nildo 78'	Summary	R.Eyyubov 15'; Poljak 21'; Anderson do Ó 85'	Stadium: Lankaran City Stadium; Attendance: 6,000; Referee: Aliyar Ağayev

29 March 2014 28	Neftchi Baku	1 – 0	Khazar Lankaran	Baku
17:00 AZT (UTC+4)	Nfor 78'	Summary		Stadium: Bakcell Arena; Attendance: 4,000; Referee: Orkhan Mämmädov

5 April 2014 29	Khazar Lankaran	1 – 0	Gabala	Lankaran
18:00 AZST (UTC+5)	Etame 71'	Summary		Stadium: Lankaran City Stadium; Attendance: 2,500; Referee: Rauf Jabbarov

12 April 2014 30	Baku	2 – 2	Khazar Lankaran	Baku
15:00 AZST (UTC+5)	Ismayilov 51' (pen.), 63' (pen.)	Summary	Nildo 2'; Elias 28'; Scarlatache (yellow card) 56' (yellow-red card) 62'	Stadium: Tofiq Bahramov Stadium; Attendance: 1,000; Referee: Ramil Diniyev

20 April 2014 31	Khazar Lankaran	1 – 1	AZAL	Lankaran
18:00 AZST (UTC+5)	Tounkara 9'	Summary	John 34'	Stadium: Lankaran City Stadium; Attendance: 1,200; Referee: Omar Paşayev

27 April 2014 32	Inter Baku	3 – 0	Khazar Lankaran	Baku
19:00 AZST (UTC+5)	Dashdemirov 5'; A.Abatsiyev 75'; D.Meza 84'	Summary		Stadium: Shafa Stadium; Attendance: 2,200; Referee: Aliyar Ağayev

2 May 2014 33	Khazar Lankaran	4 – 0	Ravan Baku	Lankaran
18:00 AZST (UTC+5)	Elias 19'; Blaževski 52'; E.Abdullayev 53'; Etame 61'	Summary		Stadium: Lankaran City Stadium; Attendance: 1,500; Referee: Elvin Äsgärov

7 May 2014 34	Khazar Lankaran	4 – 1	Sumgayit	Lankaran
18:00 AZST (UTC+5)	Tounkara 11', 45'; Etame 22'; Elias 56'	Summary	Kurbanov 3'	Stadium: Lankaran City Stadium; Attendance: 1,000; Referee: Vusal Äliyev

12 May 2014 35	Simurq	2 – 2	Khazar Lankaran	Zaqatala
18:00 AZST (UTC+5)	Ćeran 36', 89' (pen.)	Summary	Elias 3' (pen.); Z.Benouahi 8'	Stadium: Zaqatala City Stadium; Attendance: 2,000; Referee: Elvin Äsgärov

17 May 2014 36	Khazar Lankaran	2 – 1	Qarabağ	Lankaran
18:30 AZST (UTC+5)	Thiego 5'; E.Abdullayev 84'	Summary	Kapolongo 44'	Stadium: Lankaran City Stadium; Attendance: 1,200; Referee: Vusal Äliyev

==== League table ====
Pos	Team	Pld	W	D	L	GF	GA	GD	Pts	Qualification or relegation
4	Neftçi Baku	36	17	9	10	47	43	+4	60	Qualification for Europa League second qualifying round
5	Baku	36	16	9	11	53	43	+10	57	
6	Khazar Lankaran	36	12	13	11	44	49	−5	49	
7	Simurq	36	11	13	12	35	28	+7	46	
8	AZAL	36	6	13	17	29	49	−20	31	

Source: Azerbaijan Professional Football league
Rules for classification: 1) points; 2) goal difference; 3) number of goals scored.

=== Azerbaijan Cup ===
4 December 2013 Second Round	Khazar Lankaran	4 – 0	Neftçala	Lankaran
17:00 AZT (UTC+4)	Tounkara 9', 44'; Etame 20', 42'	Summary		Stadium: Lankaran City Stadium; Attendance: 3,500; Referee: Ramil Ähmädov

12 March 2014 Quarterfinals 1st leg	Araz	1 – 1	Khazar Lankaran	Nakhchivan
15:00 AZT (UTC+4)	Khalilov 90+4' (pen.)	Summary	Á. Silva 69'; Á. Silva (yellow card) 72' (yellow-red card) 90+3'	Stadium: Nakhchivan City Stadium; Attendance: 8,500; Referee: Elvin Äsgärov

19 March 2014 Quarterfinals 2nd leg	Khazar Lankaran	1 – 0 (2 – 1 agg.)	Araz	Lankaran
16:00 AZT (UTC+4)	Etame 25'	Summary		Stadium: Lankaran City Stadium; Attendance: 6,300; Referee: Orkhan Mämmädov

16 April 2014 Semifinals 1st leg	Gabala	3 – 0	Khazar Lankaran	Qabala
16:00 AZST (UTC+5)	Hajiyev 53', 71'; Mendy 59'	Summary		Stadium: Gabala City Stadium; Attendance: 2,000

24 April 2014 Semifinals 2nd leg	Khazar Lankaran	1 – 1 (1 – 4 agg.)	Gabala	Lankaran
19:00 AZST (UTC+5)	Nildo 54'	Summary	Mendy 23'	Stadium: Lankaran City Stadium; Attendance: 5,000; Referee: Rahim Häsänov

=== UEFA Europa League ===
==== Qualifying phase ====
2 July 2013 1st qualifying round 1st leg	Sliema Wanderers (Malta)	1 – 1	(Azerbaijan) Khazar Lankaran	Ta' Qali, Malta
20:45 AZST (UTC+5)	Ohawuchi 62'	Summary	Nildo 14'; Allahverdiyev (yellow card) 28' (yellow-red card) 83'	Stadium: Ta' Qali Stadium; Attendance: 394; Referee: Eiko Saar (Estonia)

11 July 2013 1st qualifying round 2nd leg	Khazar Lankaran (Azerbaijan)	1 – 0 (2 – 1 agg.)	(Malta) Sliema Wanderers	Lankaran, Azerbaijan
20:00 AZST (UTC+5)	Amirguliyev 29'; Abdullayev (red card) 84'	Report	C.Baldacchino (red card) 72'	Stadium: Lankaran City Stadium; Attendance: 11,055; Referee: Wim Smet (Belgium)

18 July 2013 2nd qualifying round 1st leg	Maccabi Haifa (Israel)	2 – 0	(Azerbaijan) Khazar Lankaran	Haifa, Israel
22:00 AZST (UTC+5)	Ezra 37'; Turgeman 55'	Report		Stadium: Kiryat Eliezer; Attendance: 9,520; Referee: Slavko Vinčić (Slovenia)

25 July 2013 2nd qualifying round 2nd leg	Khazar Lankaran (Azerbaijan)	0 – 8 (0 – 10 agg.)	(Israel) Maccabi Haifa	Lankaran, Azerbaijan
21:00 AZST (UTC+5)		Report	Turgeman 7'; Katan 10'; Rayo 13' (pen.), 62'; Abuhatzira 26', 44'; Ezra 41'; Golasa 76'	Stadium: Lankaran City Stadium; Attendance: 9,000; Referee: Danny Makkelie (Netherlands)

== Squad statistics ==
As of Match played 17 May 2014

=== Appearances and goals ===
No.	Pos	Nat	Player	Total		Premier League		Azerbaijan Cup		Europa League		Azerbaijan Supercup	
No.	Pos	Nat	Player	Apps	Goals	Apps	Goals	Apps	Goals	Apps	Goals	Apps	Goals
1	GK	(Azerbaijan) AZE	Orkhan Sadigli	31	0	26+0	0	4+0	0	0+1	0	0+0	0
2	DF	(Azerbaijan) AZE	Slavik Alkhasov	11	0	7+3	0	1+0	0	0+0	0	0+0	0
3	DF	(Brazil) BRA	Vanderson	37	0	28+2	0	4+0	0	1+1	0	1+0	0
4	DF	(Philippines) PHI	Álvaro Silva	36	1	28+2	0	2+0	1	1+2	0	1+0	0
5	DF	(Brazil) BRA	Thiego	18	2	14+0	2	4+0	0	0+0	0	0+0	0
6	DF	(Azerbaijan) AZE	Rasim Ramaldanov	29	1	20+0	0	3+1	0	3+1	0	1+0	1
7	MF	(Mali) MLI	Sadio Tounkara	44	7	24+11	5	4+1	2	3+0	0	1+0	0
8	MF	(North Macedonia) MKD	Dejan Blaževski	16	2	11+3	2	2+0	0	0+0	0	0+0	0
10	MF	(Azerbaijan) AZE	Elnur Abdullayev	42	4	33+2	4	4+0	0	1+1	0	1+0	0
11	MF	(Morocco) MAR	Zouhir Benouahi	34	1	20+5	1	2+2	0	4+0	0	1+0	0
12	FW	(Brazil) BRA	Nildo	38	10	22+8	8	2+2	1	4+0	1	0+0	0
14	MF	(Azerbaijan) AZE	Rahid Amirguliyev	40	0	29+2	0	5+0	0	3+0	0	1+0	0
16	MF	(Romania) ROU	Adrian Piț	11	0	4+1	0	1+1	0	1+3	0	0+0	0
17	MF	(Azerbaijan) AZE	Kazım Kazımlı	2	0	0+2	0	0+0	0	0+0	0	0+0	0
18	MF	(Azerbaijan) AZE	Tural Jalilov	25	0	19+2	0	3+1	0	0+0	0	0+0	0
19	GK	(Croatia) CRO	Vjekoslav Tomić	7	0	5+1	0	1+0	0	0+0	0	0+0	0
20	FW	(Cameroon) CMR	Mbilla Etame	38	15	26+6	11	5+0	3	0+0	0	1+0	1
22	MF	(Brazil) BRA	Deyvid Sacconi	15	2	9+4	2	1+0	0	0+0	0	0+1	0
23	MF	(North Macedonia) MKD	Nikola Gligorov	26	1	11+8	1	2+1	0	2+2	0	0+0	0
27	DF	(Romania) ROU	Adrian Scarlatache	38	3	29+0	3	4+0	0	4+0	0	1+0	0
30	MF	(Brazil) BRA	Elias	17	4	8+6	4	1+2	0	0+0	0	0+0	0
42	MF	(Azerbaijan) AZE	Kamran Abdullazadeh	3	0	0+1	0	0+1	0	0+0	0	0+1	0
55	FW	(Azerbaijan) AZE	Aghabala Ramazanov	22	1	8+13	1	0+0	0	0+0	0	1+0	0
97	FW	(Azerbaijan) AZE	Elnur Jafarov	1	0	0+1	0	0+0	0	0+0	0	0+0	0
Players away from the club on loan:
9	MF	(Azerbaijan) AZE	Uğur Pamuk	4	0	0+3	0	0+0	0	1+0	0	0+0	0
Players who appeared for Khazar Lankaran no longer at the club:
5	DF	(Azerbaijan) AZE	Elnur Allahverdiyev	8	0	5+0	0	0+0	0	2+1	0	0+0	0
8	MF	(Spain) ESP	Eduard Oriol	8	0	1+5	0	0+1	0	0+0	0	0+1	0
8	DF	(Brazil) BRA	Éder Bonfim	2	0	0+0	0	0+0	0	2+0	0	0+0	0
21	DF	(Bulgaria) BUL	Radomir Todorov	12	0	6+2	0	0+0	0	4+0	0	0+0	0
30	GK	(Spain) ESP	Toni Doblas	4	0	0+0	0	0+0	0	4+0	0	0+0	0
33	GK	(Brazil) BRA	Douglas	6	0	5+0	0	0+0	0	0+0	0	1+0	0
99	MF	(Croatia) CRO	Marin Oršulić	4	0	0+0	0	0+0	0	4+0	0	0+0	0

=== Goal scorers ===
Place	Position	Nation	Number	Name	Premier League	Azerbaijan Cup	Europa League	Azerbaijan Supercup	Total
1	FW	(Cameroon)	20	Mbilla Etame	11	3	0	1	15
2	FW	(Brazil)	12	Nildo	8	1	1	0	10
3	MF	(Mali)	7	Sadio Tounkara	5	2	0	0	7
4	MF	(Brazil)	30	Elias	4	0	0	0	4
4	MF	(Azerbaijan)	10	Elnur Abdullayev	4	0	0	0	4
6	DF	(Romania)	27	Adrian Scarlatache	3	0	0	0	3
7	MF	(Brazil)	22	Deyvid Sacconi	2	0	0	0	2
7	MF	(North Macedonia)	8	Dejan Blaževski	2	0	0	0	2
7	DF	(Brazil)	5	Thiego	2	0	0	0	2
10	MF	(Azerbaijan)	55	Aghabala Ramazanov	1	0	0	0	1
10	MF	(North Macedonia)	23	Nikola Gligorov	1	0	0	0	1
10	MF	(Morocco)	11	Zouhir Benouahi	1	0	0	0	1
10	DF	(Spain)	4	Álvaro Silva	0	1	0	0	1
10	MF	(Azerbaijan)	14	Rahid Amirguliyev	0	0	1	0	1
10	DF	(Azerbaijan)	6	Rasim Ramaldanov	0	0	0	1	1
				TOTALS	44	7	2	2	55

=== Disciplinary record ===
Number	Nation	Position	Name	Premier League		Azerbaijan Cup		Europa League		Azerbaijan Supercup		Total	
Number	Nation	Position	Name	Yellow card	Red card	Yellow card	Red card	Yellow card	Red card	Yellow card	Red card	Yellow card	Red card
1	(Azerbaijan)	GK	Orkhan Sadigli	2	0	0	0	0	0	0	0	2	0
2	(Azerbaijan)	MF	Slavik Alkhasov	1	0	1	0	0	0	0	0	2	0
3	(Brazil)	DF	Vanderson	1	0	0	0	0	0	0	0	1	0
4	(Philippines)	DF	Álvaro Silva	6	0	2	1	1	0	0	0	9	1
5	(Azerbaijan)	DF	Elnur Allahverdiyev	1	0	0	0	3	1	0	0	4	1
5	(Brazil)	DF	Thiego	4	0	1	0	0	0	0	0	5	0
6	(Azerbaijan)	DF	Rasim Ramaldanov	6	0	1	0	0	0	1	0	8	0
7	(Mali)	MF	Sadio Tounkara	3	0	0	0	0	0	2	1	5	1
8	(Brazil)	DF	Éder Bonfim	0	0	0	0	1	0	0	0	1	0
8	(North Macedonia)	MF	Dejan Blaževski	1	0	0	0	0	0	0	0	1	0
10	(Azerbaijan)	MF	Elnur Abdullayev	5	0	1	0	0	1	1	0	7	1
11	(Morocco)	MF	Zouhir Benouahi	3	0	1	0	0	0	1	0	5	0
12	(Brazil)	FW	Nildo	4	0	0	0	0	0	0	0	4	0
14	(Azerbaijan)	MF	Rahid Amirguliyev	7	0	1	0	1	0	1	0	10	0
16	(Romania)	MF	Adrian Piț	1	0	0	0	0	0	0	0	1	0
18	(Azerbaijan)	MF	Tural Jalilov	1	0	1	0	0	0	0	0	2	0
20	(Cameroon)	FW	Mbilla Etame	3	0	1	0	0	0	0	0	4	0
22	(Brazil)	MF	Deyvid Sacconi	1	0	0	0	0	0	0	0	1	0
23	(North Macedonia)	MF	Nikola Gligorov	3	0	0	0	1	0	0	0	4	0
27	(Romania)	DF	Adrian Scarlatache	7	1	0	0	0	0	0	0	7	1
30	(Spain)	GK	Toni Doblas	0	0	0	0	1	0	0	0	1	0
33	(Brazil)	GK	Douglas	1	0	0	0	0	0	1	0	2	0
55	(Azerbaijan)	FW	Aghabala Ramazanov	3	2	0	0	0	0	0	0	3	2
99	(Croatia)	MF	Marin Oršulić	0	0	0	0	3	0	0	0	3	0
			TOTALS	64	3	10	1	11	2	6	1	72	7

== Other information ==
Qarabağ have played their home games at the Tofiq Bahramov Stadium since 1993 due to the ongoing situation in Quzanlı. Qarabağ vs Khazar Lankaran was played at the Bakcell Arena due to the Tofiq Bahramov Stadium^{1} pitch being relaid.
