= 2014–15 FK Khazar Lankaran season =

Khazar Lankaran
2014–15 season
- President: Mubariz Mansimov
- Manager: Oğuz Çetin (until 22 December 2014); Elbrus Mammadov (from 22 December 2014)
- Stadium: Lankaran City Stadium
- Premier League: 7th
- Azerbaijan Cup: Quarterfinal vs Inter Baku
- Top goalscorer: League: Galin Ivanov (6); All: Galin Ivanov (6)
- Highest home attendance: 8,500 vs Sumgayit; 16 August 2014
- Lowest home attendance: 5,00 vs Gabala; 7 December 2014 vs Baku; 28 February 2015
- Average home league attendance: 2,612; 29 May 2015
Home colours	Away colours

The Khazar Lankaran 2014-15 season is Khazar Lankaran's tenth Azerbaijan Premier League season. They will participate in the Premier League and the Azerbaijan Cup.

Oğuz Çetin was appointed as the club's manager on 5 June 2014, following the mutual termination of Mustafa Denizli's contract at the end of the 2013–14 season. resigning as manager on 22 December, with Elbrus Mammadov taking over as manager.

== Squad ==
As of 1 February 2015

Note: Flags indicate national team as defined under FIFA eligibility rules; some limited exceptions apply. Players may hold more than one non-FIFA nationality.

No.	Pos.	Nation	Player
1	GK	AZE	Orkhan Sadigli
3	DF	AZE	Rasim Ramaldanov
4	DF	AZE	Ruslan Cafarov
6	DF	AZE	Ilgar Alakbarov
7	MF	MLI	Sadio Tounkara
8	MF	AZE	Elshan Rzazade
9	DF	AZE	Bähruz Teymurov
10	FW	AZE	Aghabala Ramazanov
11	FW	AZE	Nurxan Mänsimzadä
12	MF	AZE	Ilyas Säfärzadä
14	MF	AZE	Rahid Amirguliyev (captain)
17	MF	AZE	Kazım Kazımlı

No.	Pos.	Nation	Player
18	MF	AZE	Tural Jalilov
19	GK	CRO	Vjekoslav Tomić
25	GK	AZE	Tərlan Qasımzadə
27	DF	ROU	Adrian Scarlatache
34	DF	AZE	Elnur Ismailov
42	MF	AZE	Kamran Abdullazadeh
63	MF	SLE	Alfred Sankoh
66	MF	AZE	Bəhruz Teymurov
72	DF	AZE	Elvin Mirzəyev
96	MF	AZE	Anar Babazadä
97	FW	AZE	Elnur Jafarov
99	FW	AZE	Maqsum Qämbärli

=== Out on loan ===
Note: Flags indicate national team as defined under FIFA eligibility rules; some limited exceptions apply. Players may hold more than one non-FIFA nationality.

No.	Pos.	Nation	Player
—	FW	AZE	Orkhan Aliyev (at Sumgayit)

== Transfers ==
=== Summer ===
In: Note: Flags indicate national team as defined under FIFA eligibility rules; some limited exceptions apply. Players may hold more than one non-FIFA nationality.

No.	Pos.	Nation	Player
4	DF	AZE	Ruslan Cafarov (from (Azerbaijan) Inter Baku)
6	MF	AZE	Rashad Sadiqov (from (Azerbaijan) Neftchi Baku)
8	MF	BUL	Galin Ivanov (from (Bulgaria) Slavia Sofia)
9	MF	AZE	Uğur Pamuk (loan return from (Azerbaijan) Sumgayit)
11	FW	AZE	Rauf Aliyev (from (Azerbaijan) Baku)
12	GK	AZE	Jahangir Hasanzade (from (Azerbaijan) AZAL)
13	DF	AZE	Aleksandr Shemonayev (from (Azerbaijan) AZAL)
22	MF	AZE	Afran Ismayilov (from (Azerbaijan) Baku)
28	MF	BRA	Fernando Gabriel (from (Brazil) Paraná)
63	MF	SLE	Alfred Sankoh (from (Turkey) Şanlıurfaspor)

Out: Note: Flags indicate national team as defined under FIFA eligibility rules; some limited exceptions apply. Players may hold more than one non-FIFA nationality.

No.	Pos.	Nation	Player
2	DF	AZE	Slavik Alkhasov (to (Azerbaijan) Sumgayit)
4	DF	ESP	Álvaro Silva (to (Kuwait) Qadsia)
7	FW	CMR	Mbilla Etame (to (Turkey) Samsunspor)
9	FW	AZE	Orkhan Aliyev (loan to (Azerbaijan) Sumgayit)
11	MF	MAR	Zouhir Benouahi (to (Morocco) Olympic Safi)
12	FW	BRA	Nildo (to (Azerbaijan) Inter Baku)
16	MF	ROU	Adrian Piț (to (Romania) Viitorul Constanța)
22	MF	BRA	Deyvid Sacconi (to (Brazil) ABC)
23	MF	MKD	Nikola Gligorov (to (North Macedonia) FK Vardar)
30	MF	BRA	Elias

=== Winter ===
In: Note: Flags indicate national team as defined under FIFA eligibility rules; some limited exceptions apply. Players may hold more than one non-FIFA nationality.

No.	Pos.	Nation	Player
6	DF	AZE	Ilgar Alakbarov (from (Azerbaijan) Inter Baku)

Out: Note: Flags indicate national team as defined under FIFA eligibility rules; some limited exceptions apply. Players may hold more than one non-FIFA nationality.

No.	Pos.	Nation	Player
3	DF	BRA	Vanderson (to (Brazil) Paulista)
5	DF	BRA	Thiego (to (Brazil) Chapecoense)
6	MF	AZE	Rashad Sadiqov (to (Azerbaijan) Gabala)
8	MF	BUL	Galin Ivanov (to (Turkey) Samsunspor)
9	MF	AZE	Ugur Pamuk (to (Azerbaijan) Sumgayit)
10	MF	AZE	Elnur Abdullayev (to (Azerbaijan) Simurq)
11	FW	AZE	Rauf Aliyev (to (Azerbaijan) Neftchi Baku)
12	GK	AZE	Jahangir Hasanzade
13	DF	AZE	Aleksandr Shemonayev (to (Azerbaijan) AZAL)
22	MF	AZE	Afran Ismayilov (to (Azerbaijan) Inter Baku)
28	MF	BRA	Fernando Gabriel (to (Iran) Persepolis)
99	MF	MKD	Dejan Blaževski (to (North Macedonia) Vardar)

== Friendlies ==
27 July 2014	Arsenal Tula (Russia)	1 – 2	(Azerbaijan) Khazar Lankaran	Slovenia
AZST (UTC+5)	Goal	Summary	E.Abdullayev; Etame

10 January 2015	Tekirdağspor (Turkey)	2 – 2	(Azerbaijan) Khazar Lankaran	Antalya, Turkey
AZT (UTC+4)	A.Ramazanov 9'; Amirguliyev 89' (pen.)	[ Report]	Typhoon 59'; Volcan 65' (pen.)

14 January 2014	Chemnitzer FC (Germany)	2 – 0	(Azerbaijan) Khazar Lankaran	Antalya, Turkey
AZT (UTC+4)	Goal	Report

17 January 2014	Metalurh Zaporizhya (Ukraine)	2 – 1	(Azerbaijan) Khazar Lankaran	Antalya, Turkey
AZT (UTC+4)	Goal	Report	Goal

21 January 2014	Universitatea Craiova (Romania)	3 – 0	(Azerbaijan) Khazar Lankaran	Antalya, Turkey
AZT (UTC+4)		Report

== Competitions ==
=== Azerbaijan Premier League ===
==== Results summary ====
Overall								Home						Away					
Pld	W	D	L	GF	GA	GD	Pts	W	D	L	GF	GA	GD	W	D	L	GF	GA	GD
32	8	8	16	34	45	−11	32	7	5	4	24	16	+8	1	3	12	10	29	−19

Last updated: 29 May 2015.
Source: Soccerway

==== Results ====
9 August 2014 1	AZAL	1 – 1	Khazar Lankaran	Baku
20:00 AZST (UTC+5)	T.Khalilzade (yellow card) 29'; S.Rahimov (yellow card) 32' (yellow-red card) 59'; Kostadinov 74' (yellow card) 90+2'	Summary	Aliyev 35'; Sankoh (yellow card) 72'	Stadium: AZAL Arena; Attendance: 5,000; Referee: Rahim Häsänov

16 August 2014 2	Khazar Lankaran	0 – 1	Sumgayit	Lankaran
20:00 AZST (UTC+5)	Vanderson (yellow card) 30'; O.Sadigli (red card) 38'; Sadiqov (yellow card) 72'	Summary	O.Aliyev (yellow card) 17'; Kurbanov 38' (pen.); T.Novruzov (yellow card) 54'; Chertoganov (yellow card) 78'; T.Mammadov (yellow card) 81'; S.Mahammadaliyev (yellow card) 90+1'	Stadium: Lankaran City Stadium; Attendance: 8,500; Referee: Orkhan Mämmädov

24 August 2014 3	Simurq	2 – 0	Khazar Lankaran	Zaqatala
19:00 AZST (UTC+5)	Lambot (yellow card) 5'; S.Zargarov (yellow card) 33'; Ćeran 44' (red card) 90+2'; R.Eyyubov 61' (yellow card) 78'	Summary	Thiego (yellow card) 58'	Stadium: Zaqatala City Stadium; Attendance: 2,000; Referee: Elvin Äsgärov

29 August 2014 4	Khazar Lankaran	1 – 0	Inter Baku	Lankaran
20:00 AZST (UTC+5)	E.Abdullayev 5' (yellow card) 6'; Aliyev (yellow card) 34'; Ivanov (yellow card) 59'; Sadiqov (yellow card) 66'	Summary	D.Meza (yellow card) 16'	Stadium: Lankaran City Stadium; Attendance: 800; Referee: Aliyar Ağayev

13 September 2014 5	Neftchi Baku	1 – 0	Khazar Lankaran	Baku
17:30 AZST (UTC+5)	Flavinho 28' (yellow card) 38'; Stamenković (red card) 40'; Yunuszade (yellow card) 52'; Doroševs (yellow card) 74'; Bruno (yellow card) 87'	Summary	Amirguliyev (yellow card) 38'; Thiego (yellow card) 63' (yellow-red card) 90+3'	Stadium: Bakcell Arena; Attendance: 2,000; Referee: Aliyar Ağayev

20 September 2014 6	Khazar Lankaran	Annulled^{2}	Araz-Naxçıvan	Lankaran
19:00 AZST (UTC+5)	Ramaldanov (yellow card) 36'; Ivanov 74' (yellow card) 87'; A.Ramazanov 88'	Summary	Zubkov (yellow card) 45'; T.Hümbätov (yellow card) 50'; Yunisoğlu (yellow card) 50'	Stadium: Lankaran City Stadium; Attendance: 6,500; Referee: Ramil Diniyev

28 September 2014 7	Gabala	1 – 1	Khazar Lankaran	Qabala
19:00 AZST (UTC+5)	Huseynov (yellow card) 41' (goal) 47'; E.Jamalov (yellow card) 49'; Benga (yellow card) 58'; Abışov (yellow card) 70'	Summary	Ramaldanov (yellow card) 21'; Vanderson (yellow card) 80'; Blaževski 84'	Stadium: Gabala City Stadium; Attendance: 1,500; Referee: Omar Paşayev

19 October 2014 8	Khazar Lankaran	4 – 0	Baku	Lankaran
17:00 AZST (UTC+5)	Sankoh 35' (pen.) (yellow card) 41'; Ivanov 38'; E.Jafarov 43'; Aliyev 79' (pen.)	Summary	E.Manafov (yellow card) 26' (yellow-red card) 69'; Pelagias (yellow card) 34'; Ristović (yellow card) 36'; V.Baybalayev (yellow card) 78'; A.Mustafazadä (yellow card) 84'	Stadium: Lankaran City Stadium; Attendance: 5,000; Referee: Aliyar Ağayev

26 October 2014 9	Qarabağ	3 – 2	Khazar Lankaran	Baku
18:00 AZT (UTC+4)	Emeghara 19' (pen.), 29'; J.Taghiyev 33'; N.Alasgarov (yellow card) 42'; Quliyev (yellow card) 90+2'	Summary	Thiego (yellow card) 18'; Tounkara (yellow card) 43'; Ivanov 54'; Aliyev 56'	Stadium: Tofiq Bahramov Stadium^{1} Attendance: 1,200; Referee: Ramil Diniyev

29 October 2014 10	Sumgayit	1 – 2	Khazar Lankaran	Sumqayit
16:00 AZT (UTC+4)	Kurbanov 43'; T.Novruzov (yellow card) 48'	Summary	Fernando Gabriel 26'; E.Abdullayev (yellow card) 58'; Sankoh 65'; Amirguliyev (yellow card) 79'	Stadium: Kapital Bank Arena; Attendance: 1,500; Referee: Rahim Häsänov

2 November 2014 11	Khazar Lankaran	2 – 1	Simurq	Lankaran
17:00 AZT (UTC+4)	Ivanov (yellow card) 12' (goal) 40'; Lambot 60' (o.g.); Scarlatache (yellow card) 87'; Ramaldanov (yellow card) 90+4'	Summary	T.Akhundov (yellow card) 9'; R.Eyyubov (yellow card) 31'; V.Abdullayev (yellow card) 34'; Weitzman 38' (yellow card) 89'; Gökdemir (yellow card) 79'	Stadium: Lankaran City Stadium; Attendance: 5,000; Referee: Omar Paşayev

20 November 2014 12	Inter Baku	3 – 1	Khazar Lankaran	Baku
18:00 AZT (UTC+4)	Nildo 10'; Álvaro 20', 74'; Aghayev (yellow card) 55'; D.Meza (yellow card) 61'	Summary	Vanderson (yellow card) 32'; Amirguliyev (yellow card) 45+3'; Thiego (yellow card) 89'; Fernando Gabriel 90+3'	Stadium: Inter Arena; Attendance: 1,000; Referee: Rahim Häsänov

24 November 2014 13	Khazar Lankaran	2 – 2	Neftchi Baku	Baku
17:00 AZT (UTC+4)	Ivanov 5' (yellow card) 13'; Ismayilov 35' (red card) 74'; Tounkara (red card) 45+2'; Sadiqov (yellow card) 54'; Sankoh (yellow card) 90+2'	Summary	Qurbanov 10'; Allahverdiyev (yellow card) 11' (yellow-red card) 50'; E.Balayev (red card) 16'; Flavinho (yellow card) 30'; Nfor (yellow card) 39'; Seyidov (yellow card) 40' (goal) 90+4'; Cardoso (yellow card) 68'; N.Gurbanov (yellow card) 90+4'	Stadium: Dalga Arena; Attendance: 1,200; Referee: Elvin Äsgärov

28 November 2014 14	Araz-Naxçıvan	– ^{2}	Khazar Lankaran	Nakhchivan
AZT (UTC+4)		[ Summary]		Stadium: Nakhchivan City Stadium

7 December 2014 15	Khazar Lankaran	3 – 0	Gabala	Baku
17:00 AZT (UTC+4)	Ivanov 7'; Blaževski (yellow card) 28'; R.Tagizade 32' (o.g.); A.Ramazanov 50'; Amirguliyev (yellow card) 54'; Ramaldanov (yellow card) 79'	Summary	Abışov (yellow card) 26'; Huseynov (yellow card) 58'; Farkaš (yellow card) 82'; Ropotan (yellow card) 85'	Stadium: Bayil Stadium; Attendance: 500; Referee: Elvin Äsgärov

14 December 2014 16	Baku	0 – 0	Khazar Lankaran	Baku
14:00 AZT (UTC+4)	G.Aliyev (yellow card) 57'; Pelagias (yellow card) 63'; N.Gurbanov (yellow card) 76'; M.Madatov (yellow card) 85'	Summary	Sankoh (yellow card) 58'; Fernando Gabriel (yellow card) 84'	Stadium: Tofik Bakhramov Stadium; Attendance: 1,000; Referee: Vusal Äliyev

18 December 2014 17	Khazar Lankaran	2 – 3	Qarabağ	Lankaran
17:00 AZT (UTC+4)	Garayev 17' (o.g.); Tounkara 56' (yellow card) 71'; Thiego (yellow card) 58'; Ramaldanov (yellow card) 62'; Sadiqov (yellow card) 67'	Summary	Muarem 7', 63'; Richard (yellow card) 15'; Guseynov 80'; Garayev (yellow card) 85'	Stadium: Lankaran City Stadium; Attendance: 6,000; Referee: Orkhan Mämmädov

21 December 2014 18	Khazar Lankaran	1 – 1	AZAL	Lankaran
15:00 AZT (UTC+4)	Fernando Gabriel 60'; Ramaldanov (yellow card) 65'; Amirguliyev (yellow card) 80'	Summary	O.Lalayev (yellow card) 29'; Kļava (yellow card) 38'; Mombongo-Dues 43'; Eduardo (yellow card) 78'	Stadium: Lankaran City Stadium; Attendance: 1,000; Referee: Aliyar Ağayev

1 February 2015 19	Simurq	2 – 0	Khazar Lankaran	Zaqatala
17:00 AZT (UTC+4)	E.Abdullayev 51'; R.Eyyubov 60'; Stanojević (yellow card) 69'; Qirtimov (yellow card) 78'	Summary	I.Safarzade (yellow card) 11'; Sankoh (yellow card) 45+'; A.Ramazanov (yellow card) 53'	Stadium: Zaqatala City Stadium; Attendance: 1,000; Referee: Ramil Diniyev

7 February 2015 20	Khazar Lankaran	1 – 2	Inter Baku	Lankaran
17:00 AZT (UTC+4)	A.Babazadä (yellow card) 63'; Rzazade (yellow card) 80'; F.Bayramov 83' (o.g.)	Summary	Mirzabekov 18'; Benítez (yellow card) 21'; Mammadov (yellow card) 27'; Špičić 59'	Stadium: Lankaran City Stadium; Attendance: 2,500; Referee: Elvin Äsgärov

11 February 2015 21	Neftchi Baku	2 – 0	Khazar Lankaran	Baku
16:00 AZT (UTC+4)	Yunuszade (yellow card) 12'; Wobay 66'; S.Masimov 69'	Summary	Jalilov (yellow card) 32'; Amirguliyev (yellow card) 38'	Stadium: Bakcell Arena; Attendance: 2,000; Referee: Ramil Diniyev

14 February 2015 22	Khazar Lankaran	–	Araz-Naxçıvan	Lankaran
AZT (UTC+4)		[ Summary]		Stadium: Lankaran City Stadium

19 February 2015 23	Gabala	3 – 1	Khazar Lankaran	Qabala
17:00 AZT (UTC+4)	Ehiosun 48'; Abışov (yellow card) 49' (goal) 77'; U.Abbasov 90+3'	Summary	Tounkara 33'; Ramaldanov (yellow card) 47'	Stadium: Gabala City Stadium; Attendance: 1,000; Referee: Rahim Häsänov

28 February 2015 24	Khazar Lankaran	2 – 1	Baku	Lankaran
17:00 AZT (UTC+4)	A.Ramazanov 9', 79' (red card) 90+1'; I.Säfärzadä (yellow card) 44'	Summary	Pelagias (yellow card) 3' (yellow-red card) 90+3'; N.Gurbanov (yellow card) 26'; V.Baybalayev (yellow card) 37'; N.Novruzov 43'; G.Aliyev (yellow card) 59'	Stadium: Lankaran City Stadium; Attendance: 500; Referee: Omar Paşayev

8 March 2015 25	Qarabağ	1 – 0	Khazar Lankaran	Baku
17:00 AZT (UTC+4)	E.Mirzəyev 48' (o.g.)	Summary	E.Mirzəyev (yellow card) 50'; Sankoh (yellow card) 52'; Tounkara (yellow card) 57'; Rzazade (yellow card) 59'	Stadium: Tofiq Bahramov Stadium^{1} Attendance: 1,000; Referee: Ramil Diniyev

18 March 2015 26	AZAL	3 – 1	Khazar Lankaran	Baku
16:00 AZT (UTC+4)	Kutsenko 20'; Mombongo-Dues 42', 62'; S.Rahimov (yellow card) 59'; T.Khalilzade (yellow card) 64'; S.Asadov (yellow card) 72'	Summary	I.Alakbarov 14'; Sankoh (yellow card) 19'	Stadium: AZAL Arena; Attendance: 300; Referee: Elvin Äsgärov

1 April 2015 27	Khazar Lankaran	3 – 2	Sumgayit	Lankaran
17:00 AZST (UTC+5)	Ramaldanov 30'; Amirguliyev (yellow card) 45'; Poladov 63' (o.g.); Rzazade (yellow card) 74'; Sankoh (yellow card) 82'; Tounkara (yellow card) 85'; Scarlatache 87'	Summary	S.Alkhasov 10'; Agayev (yellow card) 26'; Mammadov (yellow card) 39'; Chertoganov 69'; B.Hasanalizade (yellow card) 86'	Stadium: Lankaran City Stadium; Attendance: 1,000; Referee: Elvin Äsgärov

5 April 2015 28	Inter Baku	2 – 0	Khazar Lankaran	Baku
18:00 AZST (UTC+5)	Mirzabekov (yellow card) 49'; D.Meza 53' (pen.); Stanković 76'	Summary	A.Ramazanov (yellow card) 52'; Scarlatache (yellow card) 60'	Stadium: Inter Arena; Attendance: 800; Referee: Omar Paşayev

9 April 2015 29	Khazar Lankaran	2 – 2	Neftchi Baku	Lankaran
17:00 AZST (UTC+5)	Sankoh (yellow card) 30' (yellow-red card) 33'; Amirguliyev 62' (yellow card) 90'; Scarlatache 74'; Tounkara (yellow card) 76'; Rzazade (yellow card) 78'	Summary	Wobay 13'; Ramos 26'; Flavinho (yellow card) 35'; Yunuszade (yellow card) 51'; E.Mehdiyev (yellow card) 56'	Stadium: Lankaran City Stadium; Attendance: 4,500; Referee: Aliyar Ağayev

16 April 2015 30	Araz-Naxçıvan	– ^{2}	Khazar Lankaran	Nakhchivan
AZST (UTC+5)		[ Summary]		Stadium: Nakhchivan City Stadium

25 April 2015 31	Khazar Lankaran	0 – 1	Gabala	Lankaran
17:00 AZST (UTC+5)	E.Mirzəyev (yellow card) 6' (yellow-red card) 45+1'; Ramaldanov (yellow card) 31'; Tounkara (yellow card) 37'; A.Ramazanov (yellow card) 85'; E.İsmailov (yellow card) 87'	Summary	Huseynov 48'; Abışov (yellow card) 78'; R.Tagizade (yellow card) 86'; E.Jamalov (yellow card) 88'	Stadium: Lankaran City Stadium; Attendance: 2,200; Referee: Rahim Häsänov

2 May 2015 32	Baku	2 – 1	Khazar Lankaran	Baku
17:00 AZST (UTC+5)	N.Novruzov 15' (pen.), 22'; N.Asgarov (yellow card) 46'; G.Aliyev (yellow card) 54' (yellow-red card) 60'; V.Baybalayev (yellow card) 89'	Summary	Sankoh (yellow card) 45+2'; Tounkara 55'; Scarlatache (yellow card) 89'	Stadium: Tofik Bakhramov Stadium; Attendance: 500; Referee: Omar Paşayev

8 May 2015 33	Khazar Lankaran	1 – 1	Qarabağ	Lankaran
18:00 AZST (UTC+5)	Sankoh (yellow card) 45'; A.Ramazanov 78'	Summary	Muarem (yellow card) 26'; George 80'; Sadygov (yellow card) 90+3'	Stadium: Lankaran City Stadium; Attendance: 2,000; Referee: Orkhan Mämmädov

16 May 2015 34	Khazar Lankaran	1 – 0	AZAL	Lankaran
18:00 AZST (UTC+5)	Jalilov (yellow card) 28'; Rzazade (yellow card) 76'; Amirguliyev 82'	Summary	E.Yagublu (yellow card) 59'	Stadium: Lankaran City Stadium; Attendance: 1,700; Referee: Ramil Diniyev

22 May 2015 35	Sumgayit	2 – 0	Khazar Lankaran	Sumqayit
18:00 AZST (UTC+5)	Kurbanov 13'; T.Mikayilov 28'; S.Alkhasov (yellow card) 32'; Mammadov (yellow card) 43'	Summary	Scarlatache (yellow card) 27' (yellow-red card) 89'	Stadium: Kapital Bank Arena; Attendance: 1,000; Referee: Orkhan Mämmädov

28 May 2015 36	Khazar Lankaran	0 – 0	Simurq	Lankaran
21:00 AZST (UTC+5)		Summary	R.İsmayilov (yellow card) 30'	Stadium: Lankaran City Stadium; Attendance: 1,000; Referee: Omar Paşayev

==== League table ====
Pos	Team	Pld	W	D	L	GF	GA	GD	Pts	Qualification
1	Qarabağ (C)	32	20	8	4	51	28	+23	68	Qualification for Champions League second qualifying round
2	Inter Baku	32	17	12	3	55	20	+35	63	Qualification for Europa League first qualifying round
3	Gabala	32	15	9	8	46	35	+11	54	Qualification for Europa League first qualifying round
4	Neftchi Baku	32	13	10	9	38	33	+5	49	Qualification for Europa League first qualifying round
5	Simurq	32	11	6	15	41	39	+2	39	
6	AZAL	32	10	9	13	37	42	−5	39	
7	Khazar Lankaran	32	8	8	16	35	46	−11	32	
8	Sumgayit	32	7	10	15	32	43	−11	31	
9	Baku	32	3	8	21	19	68	−49	17	Relegation to the Azerbaijan First Division
10	Araz-Naxçıvan (Note: Araz-Naxçıvan were officially withdrawn from the league on 17 November 2014)	0	0	0	0	0	0	0	0	Team withdrawn

Source: uefa.com
Rules for classification: 1) points; 2) head-to-head points; 3) head-to-head goal difference; 4) head-to-head goals scored; 5. head-to-head away goals (only if 2 teams are tied); 6) goal difference; 7) goals scored.
(C) Champions

=== Azerbaijan Cup ===
3 December 2014 Second Round	Khazar Lankaran	Walkover^{2}	Araz-Naxçıvan	Lankaran
18:00 AZT (UTC+4)		[ Summary]		Stadium: Lankaran City Stadium

4 March 2015 Quarterfinal 1st leg	Inter Baku	2 – 0	Khazar Lankaran	Baku
17:00 AZT (UTC+4)	D.Meza (yellow card) 38'; Álvaro 41'; Sankoh 69' (o.g.); Dashdemirov (yellow card) 73'; Salukvadze (yellow card) 77'	Summary	E.Mirzäyev (yellow card) 29'; Tounkara (yellow card) 72'	Stadium: Inter Arena; Attendance: 1,000; Referee: Orkhan Mämmädov

13 March 2015 Quarterfinal 2nd leg	Khazar Lankaran	0 – 3 (0 – 5 agg.)	Inter Baku	Lankaran
17:00 AZT (UTC+4)	Sankoh (yellow card) 14'	Summary	A.Mammadov 22'; J.Diniyev (yellow card) 32'; Aghayev (yellow card) 34'; Dashdemirov 74'; Nildo (yellow card) 87'; Ismayilov 90+1'	Stadium: Lankaran City Stadium; Attendance: 1,000; Referee: Rahim Häsänov

== Squad statistics ==
As of Match played 28 May 2015

=== Appearances and goals ===
No.	Pos	Nat	Player	Total		Premier League		Azerbaijan Cup	
No.	Pos	Nat	Player	Apps	Goals	Apps	Goals	Apps	Goals
1	GK	(Azerbaijan) AZE	Orkhan Sadigli	8	0	8	0	0	0
3	DF	(Azerbaijan) AZE	Rasim Ramaldanov	26	1	22+2	1	2	0
4	DF	(Azerbaijan) AZE	Ruslan Cafarov	7	0	1+6	0	0	0
6	DF	(Azerbaijan) AZE	Ilgar Alakbarov	4	1	1+2	1	0+1	0
7	MF	(Mali) MLI	Sadio Tounkara	26	3	22+2	3	2	0
8	MF	(Azerbaijan) AZE	Elshan Rzazade	16	0	11+4	0	1	0
9	DF	(Azerbaijan) AZE	Bahruz Teymurov	3	0	0+3	0	0	0
10	FW	(Azerbaijan) AZE	Aghabala Ramazanov	22	5	19+1	5	2	0
11	FW	(Azerbaijan) AZE	Nurxan Mänsimzadä	2	0	1	0	0+1	0
12	MF	(Azerbaijan) AZE	Ilyas Säfärzadä	14	0	11+1	0	2	0
14	MF	(Azerbaijan) AZE	Rahid Amirguliyev	33	2	31	2	2	0
17	MF	(Azerbaijan) AZE	Kazım Kazımlı	18	0	10+8	0	0	0
18	MF	(Azerbaijan) AZE	Tural Jalilov	26	0	22+2	0	2	0
19	GK	(Croatia) CRO	Vjekoslav Tomić	17	0	15	0	2	0
25	GK	(Azerbaijan) AZE	Tərlan Qasımzadə	5	0	4+1	0	0	0
27	DF	(Romania) ROU	Adrian Scarlatache	20	2	19	2	1	0
32	DF	(Azerbaijan) AZE	Zaman Mirzäzädä	1	0	0+1	0	0	0
34	DF	(Azerbaijan) AZE	Elnur Ismailov	7	0	2+5	0	0	0
42	MF	(Azerbaijan) AZE	Kamran Abdullazadeh	14	0	8+4	0	0+2	0
63	MF	(Sierra Leone) SLE	Alfred Sankoh	27	2	25	2	2	0
72	DF	(Azerbaijan) AZE	Elvin Mirzəyev	16	0	14	0	2	0
96	DF	(Azerbaijan) AZE	Anar Babazadä	6	0	1+4	0	0+1	0
97	FW	(Azerbaijan) AZE	Elnur Jafarov	27	1	17+8	1	2	0
99	FW	(Azerbaijan) AZE	Maqsum Qämbärli	8	0	1+6	0	0+1	0
Players who appeared for Khazar Lankaran no longer at the club:
3	DF	(Brazil) BRA	Vanderson	16	0	16	0	0	0
5	DF	(Brazil) BRA	Thiego	15	0	15	0	0	0
6	MF	(Azerbaijan) AZE	Rashad Sadiqov	15	0	14+1	0	0	0
7	FW	(Cameroon) CMR	Mbilla Etame	3	0	0+3	0	0	0
8	MF	(Bulgaria) BUL	Galin Ivanov	15	6	14+1	6	0	0
10	MF	(Azerbaijan) AZE	Elnur Abdullayev	14	1	10+4	1	0	0
11	FW	(Azerbaijan) AZE	Rauf Aliyev	13	3	13	3	0	0
12	FW	(Brazil) BRA	Nildo	1	0	0+1	0	0	0
12	GK	(Azerbaijan) AZE	Jahangir Hasanzade	6	0	6	0	0	0
13	DF	(Azerbaijan) AZE	Aleksandr Shemonayev	3	0	3	0	0	0
22	MF	(Azerbaijan) AZE	Afran Ismayilov	11	1	4+7	1	0	0
28	MF	(Brazil) BRA	Fernando Gabriel	12	3	1+11	3	0	0
99	MF	(North Macedonia) MKD	Dejan Blaževski	5	1	3+2	1	0	0

=== Goal scorers ===
Place	Position	Nation	Number	Name	Premier League	Azerbaijan Cup	Total
1	MF	(Bulgaria)	8	Galin Ivanov	6	0	6
2	FW	(Azerbaijan)	55	Aghabala Ramazanov	5	0	5
3	FW	(Azerbaijan)	11	Rauf Aliyev	3	0	3
3	MF	(Brazil)	28	Fernando Gabriel	3	0	3
3	MF	(Mali)	7	Sadio Tounkara	3	0	3
3				Own goal	3	0	3
7	MF	(Sierra Leone)	63	Alfred Sankoh	2	0	2
7	DF	(Romania)	27	Adrian Scarlatache	2	0	2
7	MF	(Azerbaijan)	14	Rahid Amirguliyev	2	0	2
10	MF	(Azerbaijan)	10	Elnur Abdullayev	1	0	1
10	MF	(North Macedonia)	99	Dejan Blaževski	1	0	1
10	FW	(Azerbaijan)	97	Elnur Jafarov	1	0	1
10	MF	(Azerbaijan)	22	Afran Ismayilov	1	0	1
10	DF	(Azerbaijan)	6	Ilgar Alakbarov	1	0	1
10	DF	(Azerbaijan)	3	Rasim Ramaldanov	1	0	1
				TOTALS	35	0	35

=== Disciplinary record ===
Number	Nation	Position	Name	Premier League		Azerbaijan Cup		Total	
Number	Nation	Position	Name	Yellow card	Red card	Yellow card	Red card	Yellow card	Red card
1	(Azerbaijan)	GK	Orkhan Sadigli	0	1	0	0	0	1
3	(Brazil)	DF	Vanderson	3	0	0	0	3	0
3	(Azerbaijan)	DF	Rasim Ramaldanov	7	0	0	0	7	0
5	(Brazil)	DF	Thiego	6	1	0	0	6	1
6	(Azerbaijan)	MF	Rashad Sadiqov	4	0	0	0	4	0
7	(Mali)	MF	Sadio Tounkara	6	1	1	0	7	1
8	(Bulgaria)	MF	Galin Ivanov	3	0	0	0	3	0
8	(Azerbaijan)	MF	Elshan Rzazade	5	0	0	0	5	0
10	(Azerbaijan)	MF	Elnur Abdullayev	2	0	0	0	2	0
10	(Azerbaijan)	FW	Aghabala Ramazanov	3	1	0	0	3	1
11	(Azerbaijan)	MF	Rauf Aliyev	1	0	0	0	1	0
12	(Azerbaijan)	MF	Ilyas Säfärzadä	2	0	0	0	2	0
14	(Azerbaijan)	MF	Rahid Amirguliyev	8	0	0	0	8	0
18	(Azerbaijan)	MF	Tural Jalilov	2	0	0	0	2	0
22	(Azerbaijan)	MF	Afran Ismayilov	0	1	0	0	0	1
27	(Romania)	DF	Adrian Scarlatache	5	1	0	0	5	1
28	(Brazil)	MF	Fernando Gabriel	1	0	0	0	1	0
34	(Azerbaijan)	DF	Elnur Ismailov	1	0	0	0	1	0
63	(Sierra Leone)	MF	Alfred Sankoh	12	1	1	0	13	1
72	(Azerbaijan)	DF	Elvin Mirzəyev	3	1	1	0	4	1
96	(Azerbaijan)	MF	Anar Babazadä	1	0	0	0	1	0
99	(North Macedonia)	MF	Dejan Blaževski	1	0	0	0	1	0
			TOTALS	76	8	3	0	79	8

== Notes ==
- Qarabağ have played their home games at the Tofiq Bahramov Stadium since 1993 due to the ongoing situation in Quzanlı.
- Araz-Naxçıvan were excluded from the Azerbaijan Premier League on 17 November 2014, with all their results being annulled.
