= 2013–14 Azerbaijan Cup =

Tournament details
- Country: Azerbaijan
- Teams: 20

Tournament statistics
- Matches played: 25
- Goals scored: 70 (2.8 per match)
- Top goal scorer(s): Mbilla Etame (3); Victor Mendy (3)

The Azerbaijan Cup 2013–14 is the 22nd season of the annual cup competition in Azerbaijan. The competition started on 23 October 2012 with three games in the first round, with the fourth being played a week later on 30 October due to Ağsu's ground being used for the 2013 Azerbaijan Supercup. The 10 Azerbaijan Premier League teams entering at the last 16 stage, joining the four First round winners. The competition is scheduled to end on 28 May 2014 with the final. Neftchi Baku are the defending champions. Twenty teams are scheduled to compete in this year's competition. The winner of the competition will qualify for the first qualifying round of the 2014–15 UEFA Europa League.

== First round ==
The games were played on the 23 and 30 October 2013.

23 October 2013 Match 1	Shusha	4 – 2	Shahdag	Baku
15:00 AZST (UTC+5)	Adisirinli 2', 21'; Xälilov 28'; Qarayev 64'	Summary	Zilpokarov 24'; Agamov 62' (pen.)	Stadium: Shafa Stadium (IV field); Attendance: 100; Referee: Omar Paşayev

23 October 2013 Match 2	MOIK Baku	1 – 3	Qaradağ	Baku
13:00 AZST (UTC+5)	Väliyev 25'; Äliyev (yellow card) 82' (yellow-red card) 90+2'	Summary	Alakbarov 45+1'; Aghakishiyev 68'; Allahverdiyev 84'	Stadium: Tofik Bakhramov Stadium Training Ground; Attendance: 100; Referee: Ramil Diniyev

23 October 2013 Match 3	Mil-Muğan	4 – 2	Lokomotiv-Bilajary	Imishli
15:00 AZST (UTC+5)	Färäcli 3'; Hacıyev 18'; Mehräliyev (red card) 42'; Elx.Mämmädov 69'; Babayev 75'; Färäcli (red card) 88'	Summary	Häsänzadä 37'; Äsgärov (red card) 79'; Jäfärov (red card) 88'; Gurbatov 90+2'	Stadium: Heydar Aliyev Stadium; Attendance: 500; Referee: Sabayel Gurbanova

30 October 2013 Match 4	Araz	1 – 0 (a.e.t.)	Ağsu	Nakhchivan
14:00 AZT (UTC+4)	Chobanov 107'	Summary		Stadium: Nakhchivan City Stadium; Attendance: 3,000; Referee: Anar Salmanov

== Second round ==
The four winners from the first round joined the remaining ten teams from the Azerbaijan Premier League. All the games were played on 4 December 2013.

4 December 2013 Match 5	Inter Baku	7 – 0	Shusha	Baku
15:00 AZT (UTC+4)	Iashvili 27', 61'; Špičić 33'; Amirjanov 37'; A.Mammadov 44', 57'; Abatsiyev 90+1'	Summary	Garayev (yellow card) 45+1' (yellow-red card) 84'	Stadium: Shafa Stadium; Attendance: 400; Referee: Anar Salmanov

4 December 2013 Match 6	Neftchi Baku	1 – 0	Kapaz	Baku
14:00 AZT (UTC+4)	Nfor 57'	Summary		Stadium: Bakcell Arena; Attendance: 450; Referee: Alik Yunusov

4 December 2013 Match 7	Qaradağ FK	2 – 5	Ravan Baku	Baku
12:00 AZT (UTC+4)	Mamedov 21'; Jafarov (red card) 36'; Hasanov 60' (pen.)	Summary	Pecha 19'; Garaev 27', 90+3'; Abdulov 40' (pen.); Abdullayev 64'	Stadium: Bayil Stadium; Attendance: 200; Referee: Omar Paşayev

4 December 2013 Match 8	Baku	2 – 1	Sumgayit	Baku
13:00 AZT (UTC+4)	Šolić 59' (pen.); Ristović 90+3'	Summary	Alxasov 85'	Stadium: Tofik Bakhramov Stadium Training Ground; Attendance: 300; Referee: Vusal Aliyev

4 December 2013 Match 9	Mil-Muğan	1 – 2	Gabala	Qabala
13:00 AZT (UTC+4)	Eln. Mämmädov 1'; Häsänov (red card) 11'	Summary	Leonardo 15' (pen.); Afolabi 18'	Stadium: Gabala City Stadium; Attendance: 500; Referee: Elvin Äsgärov

4 December 2013 Match 10	Qarabağ	1 – 0	AZAL	Baku
16:30 AZT (UTC+4)	Reynaldo 79'	Summary	Shemonayev (yellow card) 43' (yellow-red card) 64'	Stadium: Tofik Bakhramov Stadium; Attendance: 200; Referee: Ramil Diniyev

4 December 2013 Match 11	Araz	2 – 2 (a.e.t.) (4 – 2 p)	Simurq	Nakhchivan
14:00 AZT (UTC+4)	Janalidze 45' (pen.); Soltanov 88'	Summary	Eyyubov 14' (pen.), 80'; Akhundov (yellow card) 5' (yellow-red card) 90+3'	Stadium: Nakhchivan City Stadium; Attendance: 6,000; Referee: Orkhan Mämmädov

4 December 2013 Match 12	Khazar Lankaran	4 – 0	Neftçala	Lankaran
15:00 AZT (UTC+4)	Tounkara 9', 44'; Etame 20', 42'	Summary		Stadium: Lankaran City Stadium; Attendance: 3,500; Referee: Ramil Ähmädov

== Quarterfinals ==
The eight winners from the second round are drawn into four two-legged ties. The first legs were played on 12 March 2014 with the second legs taking place a week later on 19 March 2014.

12 March 2014 Match 13 First leg	Inter Baku	1 – 1	Neftchi Baku	Baku
19:00 AZT (UTC+4)	Javadov 83'	Summary	Nasimov 51'	Stadium: Shafa Stadium; Attendance: 2,000; Referee: Äliyar Ağayev

19 March 2014 Match 13 Second leg	Neftchi Baku	0 – 0 (a1 – 1 agg.)	Inter Baku	Baku
19:00 AZT (UTC+4)		Summary		Stadium: Bakcell Arena

12 March 2014 Match 14 First leg	Ravan Baku	0 – 1	Baku	Baku
15:00 AZT (UTC+4)		Summary	J. Hüseynov 28'	Stadium: Bayil Stadium; Attendance: 300; Referee: Orxan Mämmädov

19 March 2014 Match 14 Second leg	Baku	0 – 1 (a.e.t.) (1 – 1 agg.) (8 – 9 p)	Ravan Baku	Baku
14:00 AZT (UTC+4)		Summary	E.Hasanliyev 84' (pen.)	Stadium: Tofik Bakhramov Stadium; Attendance: 300; Referee: Elvin Äsgärov
	Penalties
	Penalty scored Penalty missed		Penalty scored

12 March 2014 Match 15 First leg	Gabala	0 – 0	Qarabağ	Qabala
14:30 AZT (UTC+4)		Summary		Stadium: Gabala City Stadium; Attendance: 1,200; Referee: Rähim Häsänov

19 March 2014 Match 15 Second leg	Qarabağ	1 – 2 (1 – 2 agg.)	Gabala	Baku
17:00 AZT (UTC+4)	Reynaldo 61'	Summary	Subotić 45+1'; Mendy 82'	Stadium: Tofiq Bahramov Stadium^{1}

12 March 2014 Match 16 First leg	Araz	1 – 1	Khazar Lankaran	Nakhchivan
15:00 AZT (UTC+4)	Khalilov 90+4' (pen.)	Summary	Á. Silva 69'; Á. Silva (yellow card) 72' (yellow-red card) 90+3'	Stadium: Nakhchivan City Stadium; Attendance: 8,500; Referee: Elvin Äsgärov

19 March 2014 Match 16 Second leg	Khazar Lankaran	1 – 0 (2 – 1 agg.)	Araz	Lankaran
16:00 AZT (UTC+4)	Etame 25'	Summary		Stadium: Lankaran City Stadium; Attendance: 6,300; Referee: Orkhan Mämmädov

== Semifinals ==
The four quarterfinal winners are drawn into two two-legged semifinal ties. The first legs are to be played on 16 April 2014. The second legs are scheduled for 24 April.

16 April 2014 Match 17 First leg	Neftchi Baku	1 – 1	Ravan Baku	Baku
19:00 AZST (UTC+5)	Abdullayev 52'	Summary	Miracema 90+3'	Stadium: Bakcell Arena; Attendance: 1,500; Referee: Rauf Jabbarov

24 April 2014 Match 17 Second leg	Ravan Baku	1 – 3 (2 – 4 agg.)	Neftchi Baku	Baku
17:00 AZST (UTC+5)	Varea 17'	Summary	Qurbanov 9'; Flavinho 18'; Bertucci 55'	Stadium: Bayil Stadium; Attendance: 500; Referee: Aliyar Ağayev

16 April 2014 Match 18 First leg	Gabala	3 – 0	Khazar Lankaran	Qabala
16:00 AZST (UTC+5)	Hajiyev 53', 71'; Mendy 59'	Summary		Stadium: Gabala City Stadium; Attendance: 2,000; Referee: Rahim Häsänov

24 April 2014 Match 18 Second leg	Khazar Lankaran	1 – 1 (1–4 agg.)	Gabala	Lankaran
19:00 AZST (UTC+5)	Nildo 56'	Summary	Mendy 21'	Stadium: Lankaran City Stadium; Attendance: 5,000; Referee: Rahim Häsänov

== Final ==
22 May 2014
20:00 AZST (UTC+5)

Neftchi Baku	1 – 1 (a.e.t.)	Gabala
Masimov 52'		Izmailov 71'
Penalties
Ramos (penalty scored); Flavinho (penalty scored); Denis (penalty missed); Bruno (penalty scored)	3 – 2	Izmailov (penalty missed); Santos (penalty missed); Assis (penalty scored); Hajiyev (penalty scored); Niasse (penalty missed)

Tofiq Bahramov Stadium, Baku
Attendance: 22,000
Referee: Aliyar Ağayev

== Scorers ==
3 goals:

- (Senegal) Victor Mendy, Gabala
- (Cameroon) Mbilla Etame, Khazar Lankaran

2 goals:

- (Azerbaijan) Nizami Hajiyev, Gabala
- (Azerbaijan) Asif Mammadov, Inter Baku
- (Georgia (country)) Alexander Iashvili, Inter Baku
- (Mali) Sadio Tounkara, Khazar Lankaran
- (Brazil) Reynaldo, Qarabağ
- (Azerbaijan) Vusal Garaev, Ravan Baku
- (Azerbaijan) Elvin Adısirinli, Shusha
- (Azerbaijan) Rashad Eyyubov, Simurq

1 goal:

- (Azerbaijan) Elmin Chobanov, Araz
- (Georgia (country)) David Janalidze, Araz
- (Azerbaijan) Tarlan Khalilov, Araz
- (Azerbaijan) Bakhtiyar Soltanov, Araz
- (Azerbaijan) Javid Huseynov, Baku
- (Croatia) Aleksandar Šolić, Baku
- (Serbia) Risto Ristović, Baku
- (Nigeria) Abdulwaheed Afolabi, Gabala
- (Brazil) Leonardo, Gabala
- (Russia) Marat Izmailov, Gabala
- (Switzerland) Danijel Subotić, Gabala
- (Azerbaijan) Abdulla Abatsiyev, Inter Baku
- (Azerbaijan) Ruslan Amirjanov, Inter Baku
- (Azerbaijan) Vagif Javadov, Inter Baku
- (Croatia) Matija Špičić, Inter Baku
- (Spain) Álvaro Silva, Khazar Lankaran
- (Brazil) Nildo, Khazar Lankaran
- (Azerbaijan) Kamran Häsänzadä, Lokomotiv-Bilajary
- (Azerbaijan) Tural Gurbatov, Lokomotiv-Bilajary
- (Azerbaijan) Samir Babayev, Mil-Muğan
- (Azerbaijan) Nicat Färäcli, Mil-Muğan
- (Azerbaijan) Elşän Hacıyev, Mil-Muğan
- (Azerbaijan) Elxan Mämmädov, Mil-Muğan
- (Azerbaijan) Elnur Mämmädov, Mil-Muğan
- (Azerbaijan) Arzuman Väliyev, MOIK Baku
- (Uzbekistan) Bahodir Nasimov, Neftchi Baku
- (Azerbaijan) Araz Abdullayev, Neftchi Baku
- (Brazil) Bruno, Neftchi Baku
- (Brazil) Flavinho, Neftchi Baku
- (Azerbaijan) Samir Masimov, Neftchi Baku
- (Cameroon) Ernest Nfor, Neftchi Baku
- (Azerbaijan) Ruslan Qurbanov, Neftchi Baku
- (Azerbaijan) Murad Aghakishiyev, Qaradağ
- (Azerbaijan) Novruz Alakbarov, Qaradağ
- (Azerbaijan) Ilham Allahverdiyev, Qaradağ
- (Azerbaijan) Anar Hasanov, Qaradağ
- (Azerbaijan) Rufat Mamedov, Qaradağ
- (Czech Republic) Ivan Pecha, Ravan Baku
- (Azerbaijan) Elnur Abdulov, Ravan Baku
- (Azerbaijan) Rashad Abdullayev, Ravan Baku
- (Brazil) Thiago Miracema, Ravan Baku
- (Azerbaijan) Elvin Hasanliyev, Ravan Baku
- (Argentina) Juan Varea, Ravan Baku
- (Azerbaijan) Mahiddin Agamov, Shahdag
- (Azerbaijan) Abdulla Zilpokarov, Shahdag
- (Azerbaijan) Israfil Qarayev, Shusha
- (Azerbaijan) Muhammad Halilov, Shusha
- (Azerbaijan) Slavik Alkhasov, Sumgayit

== Notes ==
- Qarabağ have played their home games at the Tofiq Bahramov Stadium since 1993 due to the ongoing situation in Quzanlı.
