= Rafael Lima =

Rafael Lima may refer to:

- Rafael Lima (boxer) (born 1983), Brazilian boxer
- Rafael Lima (footballer) (born 1986), Brazilian footballer
