= Douglas Leite =

Brazilian footballer (born 1980)

Personal information
- Full name: Douglas Gonzaga Leite
- Date of birth: 27 March 1980 (age 46)
- Place of birth: Itaporanga, Brazil
- Height: 1.89 m (6 ft 2 in)
- Position: Goalkeeper

Team information
- Current team: Santo André (head coach)

Youth career
- Corinthians
- São José-SP

Senior career*
Years	Team	Apps	(Gls)
2000–2002	São José-SP		
2003–2005	Coritiba	32	(0)
2006	Mineiros		
2006	Académica	0	(0)
2007	ADAP Galo Maringá		
2008	Icasa	22	(0)
2008	Avaí	1	(0)
2009–2010	Guarani	86	(0)
2011	Naútico	13	(0)
2011	Red Bull Brasil	0	(0)
2012	Linense	18	(0)
2012	Criciúma	20	(0)
2013	Audax Rio	1	(0)
2013	Khazar Lankaran	5	(0)
2014	Guarani	12	(0)

Managerial career
- 2018: União Luziense
- 2019: Castanhal
- 2019: Icasa
- 2020–2021: Taubaté U20
- 2021: Taubaté (assistant)
- 2021–2022: Taubaté
- 2023–2024: Ituano (assistant)
- 2023: Ituano (interim)
- 2024: Ituano (interim)
- 2025: Ponte Preta (assistant)
- 2025–2026: América Mineiro (assistant)
- 2026: América Mineiro (interim)
- 2027–: Santo André
- * Club domestic league appearances and goals

Douglas Gonzaga Leite (born 27 March 1980), sometimes known as just Douglas, is a Brazilian football coach and former player who played as a goalkeeper. He is the current head coach of Santo André.

== Career ==
Douglas Leite came to football at St. Joseph Sports Club. It went through several clubs in Brazil and abroad, and hit his engagement with the Avaí on 11 May 2008, when he was reserve goalkeeper Eduardo Martini's campaign team in the Campeonato Brasileiro Serie B 2008 culminating in the achievement of access the series A. Later, Douglas Leite was hired by Mirassol to compete in the Paulista championship in 2009, but did not even play for the club is moving straight to the Guarani to fight for the championship.

In July 2013 Leite signed for Azerbaijan Premier League side Khazar Lankaran. On 25 November 2013 it was announced that Douglas would leave Khazar Lankaran to re-sign with Guarani for the 2014 Série A2 season.

== Career statistics ==
(Correct as of 22 November 2013)

Club	Season	State League		Brazilian Série A/B		Copa do Brasil		Copa Libertadores		Copa Sudamericana		Total	
Club	Season	Apps	Goals	Apps	Goals	Apps	Goals	Apps	Goals	Apps	Goals	Apps	Goals
Guarani	2010	17	0	37	0	-	-	-	-	-	-	54	0
Guarani	2009	7	0	24	0	-	-	-	-	-	-	31	0
Total		24	0	61	0	-	-	-	-	-	-	85	0
Club	Season	League		Azerbaijan Supercup		Azerbaijan Cup		UEFA Champions League		UEFA Europa League		Total	
Club	Season	Apps	Goals	Apps	Goals	Apps	Goals	Apps	Goals	Apps	Goals	Apps	Goals
Khazar Lankaran	2013–14	5	0	1	0	0	0	-	-	0	0	6	0
Total		5	0	1	0	-	-	-	-	-	-	6	0
Total		28	0	62	0	-	-	-	-	-	-	91	0

== Honours ==
- Coritiba
  - Campeonato Paranaense: 2003, 2004
- Khazar Lankaran
  - Azerbaijan Supercup: 2013

== Contract ==
- Naútico
- Red Bull Brasil
