= Adrian Scarlatache =

Romanian footballer

Personal information
- Full name: Adrian Manuel Scarlatache
- Date of birth: 5 December 1986 (age 39)
- Place of birth: Turnu Măgurele, Romania
- Height: 1.84 m (6 ft 0 in)
- Position: Defender

Team information
- Current team: Concordia Chiajna (head coach)

Youth career
- 2000–2004: Dinamo București

Senior career*
Years	Team	Apps	(Gls)
2004–2010	Dinamo II București	20	(1)
2005–2012	Dinamo București	76	(2)
2005–2006	→ Pandurii Târgu Jiu (loan)	27	(0)
2006	→ Jiul Petroşani (loan)	12	(0)
2008	→ Dacia Mioveni (loan)	10	(0)
2008	→ Otopeni (loan)	16	(1)
2011	→ Khazar Lankaran (loan)	12	(1)
2012–2015	Khazar Lankaran	84	(10)
2016	Astra Giurgiu	1	(0)
2016–2018	Keşla	47	(5)
2018–2020	Zira	34	(1)
2020–2021	Hermannstadt	21	(1)
2021–2023	Mioveni	62	(5)
2023–2024	Argeș Pitești	4	(0)
2024	Concordia Chiajna	7	(0)
Total		433	(27)

International career
2003	Romania U17	5	(0)
2005–2006	Romania U19	3	(1)
2006–2007	Romania U21	3	(0)

Managerial career
- 2024–2025: Concordia Chiajna (team manager)
- 2025–2026: Concordia Chiajna (assistant)
- 2026–: Concordia Chiajna
- * Club domestic league appearances and goals

Adrian Manuel Scarlatache (born 5 December 1986) is a Romanian former professional footballer who played as a defender, currently in charge of Liga II club Concordia Chiajna.

== Club career ==
Scarlatache started his career for Dinamo București but was loaned out to different other clubs, amongst which Pandurii Târgu Jiu or Mioveni.

In 2011, he was loaned out to Khazar Lankaran, of the Azerbaijan Premier League, where he impressed but was not kept. He returned to Dinamo, where he became integral part of the first team, and scored the winning goal in the Romanian Cup final against Rapid București. After the final, he announced that he was leaving Dinamo, going back to Lankaran, where he signed a contract for two years with Khazar.

On 2016, Scarlatache signed with Astra Giurgiu.

On 4 September 2018, Scarlatache signed one-year contract with Zira FK. On 11 June 2019, Scarlatache signed a new one-year contract with Zira.

On 22 June 2023, Argeș Pitești announced the signing of Scarlatache.

== Career statistics ==
Appearances and goals by club, season and competition
Club	Season	League			National cup (Note: Includes Cupa României, Azerbaijan Cup)		Europe		Other		Total	
Club	Season	Division	Apps	Goals	Apps	Goals	Apps	Goals	Apps	Goals	Apps	Goals
Dinamo II București	2004–05	Divizia B	19	1	1	0	—		—		20	1
Dinamo II București	2009–10	Liga II	1	0	0	0	—		—		1	0
Dinamo II București	Total		20	1	1	0	—		—		21	1
Pandurii Târgu Jiu (loan)	2005–06	Divizia A	27	0	0	0	—		—		27	0
Jiul Petroşani (loan)	2006–07	Liga I	12	0	1	0	—		—		13	0
Dinamo București	2006–07	Liga I	6	0	—		0	0	—		6	0
Dinamo București	2007–08	Liga I	1	0	2	0	0	0	0	0	3	0
Dinamo București	2008–09	Liga I	12	0	2	0	—		—		14	0
Dinamo București	2009–10	Liga I	27	1	2	0	5 (Note: Appearances in UEFA Europa League)	0	—		34	1
Dinamo București	2010–11	Liga I	8	1	2	0	4	0	—		14	1
Dinamo București	2011–12	Liga I	22	0	5	1	4	0	—		31	1
Dinamo București	Total		76	2	13	1	13	0	0	0	102	3
Mioveni (loan)	2007–08	Liga I	10	0	1	0	—		—		11	0
Otopeni (loan)	2008–09	Liga I	16	1	2	0	—		—		18	1
Khazar Lankaran (loan)	2010–11	Azerbaijan Premier League	12	1	5	1	—		—		17	2
Khazar Lankaran	2012–13	Azerbaijan Premier League	27	5	6	0	4	1	—		37	6
Khazar Lankaran	2013–14	Azerbaijan Premier League	29	3	4	0	4	0	1 (Note: Appearance in the Azerbaijan Supercup)	0	38	3
Khazar Lankaran	2014–15	Azerbaijan Premier League	19	2	1	0	—		—		20	2
Khazar Lankaran	2015–16	Azerbaijan Premier League	9	0	0	0	—		—		9	0
Khazar Lankaran	Total		96	11	16	1	8	1	1	0	121	13
Astra Giurgiu	2015–16	Liga I	1	0	—		—		2 (Note: Appearances in the Cupa Ligii)	0	3	0
Keşla	2016–17	Azerbaijan Premier League	19	1	5	1	—		—		24	2
Keşla	2017–18	Azerbaijan Premier League	27	4	6	1	4	2	—		37	7
Keşla	2018–19	Azerbaijan Premier League	1	0	—		1	0	—		2	0
Keşla	Total		47	5	11	2	5	2	—		63	9
Zira	2018–19	Azerbaijan Premier League	19	0	4	0	—		—		23	0
Zira	2019–20	Azerbaijan Premier League	15	1	2	0	—		—		17	1
Zira	Total		34	1	6	0	—		—		40	1
Hermannstadt	2020–21	Liga I	21	1	0	0	—		2 (Note: Appearances in Liga I promotion/relegation play-offs)	0	23	1
Mioveni	2021–22	Liga I	34	2	1	0	—		—		35	2
Mioveni	2022–23	Liga I	28	3	2	0	—		—		30	3
Mioveni	Total		62	5	3	0	—		—		65	5
Argeș Pitești	2023–24	Liga II	4	0	2	0	—		—		6	0
Concordia Chiajna	2023–24	Liga II	7	0	—		—		—		7	0
Career total			433	27	56	4	26	3	5	0	520	34

== Honours ==
Dinamo București

- Liga I: 2006–07
- Cupa României: 2011–12
- Supercupa României runner-up: 2007

Khazar Lankaran

- Azerbaijan Cup : 2010–11
- Azerbaijan Supercup : 2013

Astra Giurgiu

- Liga I : 2015–16

Keşla

- Azerbaijan Cup : 2017–18
