= 2014 Azerbaijan Supercup =

- Event: Azerbaijan Supercup
Neftchi Baku	Qarabağ
- Date: 24 September 2014
- Venue: Gabala City Stadium, Qabala

2014 Azerbaijan Supercup (Azerbaijani: Futbol üzrə Azərbaycan Superkuboku 2014) was the 5th edition of the Azerbaijan Supercup since its establishment in 1992. The match was contested between the 2013–14 Azerbaijan Premier League champions Qarabağ and the 2013–14 Azerbaijan Cup champions Neftchi Baku.

== Match ==
=== Details ===
24 September 2014
AZST (UTC+5)

Neftchi Baku	2-2 (3-4)	Qarabağ
	[Report]

Gabala City Stadium, Qabala

Neftchi Baku	Qarabağ

== See also ==
- 2013–14 Azerbaijan Premier League
- 2013–14 Azerbaijan Cup
