= 2013 Azerbaijan Supercup =

- Event: Azerbaijan Supercup
| Neftchi Baku | Khazar |
| 1 | 2 |
- Date: 23 October 2013
- Venue: Nakhchivan City Stadium, Nakhchivan City
- Man of the Match: TBA
- Referee: Rahim Hasanov
- Weather: Fine

2013 Azerbaijan Supercup (Azerbaijani: 2013 Futbol üzrə Azərbaycan Superkuboku) was the 4th edition of the Azerbaijan Supercup since its establishment in 1992. The match was contested between the 2012–13 Azerbaijan Premier League champions Neftchi Baku and the 2012–13 Azerbaijan Cup finalists Khazar Lankaran.

== Match ==
=== Details ===
23 October 2013
15:00 AZST (UTC+5)

| Neftchi Baku | 1 – 2 | Khazar |
|---|---|---|
| Cardoso 68' | Report (in Russian) | Etame 28'; Tounkara (yellow card) 26' (yellow-red card) 64'; Ramaldanov 90' |

Nakhchivan City Stadium, Nakhchivan City
Attendance: 9,800
Referee: Rahim Hasanov

| Neftchi Baku | Khazar |

| GK | 30 | (Serbia) Saša Stamenković | (yellow card) 64' |
| DF | 2 | (Brazil) Carlos Cardoso | (substituted off) 78' |
| DF | 3 | (Brazil) Denis Silva |
| DF | 16 | (Brazil) Bruno Bertucci |
| DF | 22 | (Azerbaijan) Mahir Shukurov | (yellow card) 87' |
| MF | 6 | (Azerbaijan) Rashad Sadiqov (c) |
| MF | 15 | (Paraguay) Eric Ramos |
| MF | 7 | (Azerbaijan) Araz Abdullayev | (yellow card) 87' |
| MF | 9 | (Brazil) Flavinho | (yellow card) 26' |
| MF | 19 | (Azerbaijan) Mirhuseyn Seyidov | (substituted off) 56' |
| FW | 11 | (Uzbekistan) Bahodir Nasimov | (yellow card) 51' | (substituted off) 60' |
Substitutes:
| GK | 1 | (Latvia) Pāvels Doroševs |
| DF | 4 | (Azerbaijan) Tarlan Guliyev |
| DF | 5 | (North Macedonia) Igor Mitreski |
| MF | 10 | (Azerbaijan) Javid Imamverdiyev | (substituted on) 56' |
| FW | 11 | (Netherlands) Melvin Platje | (substituted on) 78' |
| DF | 32 | (Azerbaijan) Elvin Yunuszade |
| FW | 90 | (Cameroon) Ernest Nfor | (substituted on) 60' |
Manager:
(Azerbaijan) Tarlan Ahmadov

| GK | 33 | (Brazil) Douglas Leite | (yellow card) 86' |
| DF | 3 | (Brazil) Vanderson Scardovelli |
| DF | 4 | (Spain) Álvaro Silva |
| DF | 6 | (Azerbaijan) Rasim Ramaldanov | (yellow card) 36' |
| DF | 27 | (Romania) Adrian Scarlatache |
| MF | 7 | (Mali) Sadio Tounkara | (yellow card) 26' (yellow-red card) 64' |
| MF | 10 | (Azerbaijan) Elnur Abdullayev | (yellow card) 90+6' |
| MF | 14 | (Azerbaijan) Rahid Amirguliyev (c) | (yellow card) 51' |
| MF | 11 | (Morocco) Zouhir Benouahi | (yellow card) 87' | (substituted off) 80' |
| CF | 55 | (Azerbaijan) Ağabala Ramazanov | (substituted off) 71' |
| CF | 20 | (Cameroon) Mbilla Etame | (substituted off) 90+2' |
Substitutes:
| GK | 1 | (Azerbaijan) Orkhan Sadigli |
| MF | 8 | (Spain) Eduard Oriol | (substituted on) 80' |
| MF | 18 | (Azerbaijan) Tural Jalilov |
| DF | 21 | (Bulgaria) Radomir Todorov |
| MF | 22 | (Brazil) Deyvid Sacconi | (substituted on) 90+2' |
| MF | 23 | (North Macedonia) Nikola Gligorov |
| MF | 42 | (Azerbaijan) Kamran Abdullazadeh | (substituted on) 71' |
Manager:
(Wales) John Toshack

Match officials

- Assistant referees:
  - Yasher Abbasov
  - Vagif Musayev
- Fourth official: Rauf Jabbarov

Match rules

- 90 minutes
- 30 minutes of extra-time if necessary
- Penalty shoot-out if scores still level
- Seven named substitutes
- Maximum of three substitutions

== See also ==
- 2012–13 Azerbaijan Premier League
- 2012–13 Azerbaijan Cup
