= Edu Oriol =

Spanish footballer (born 1986)

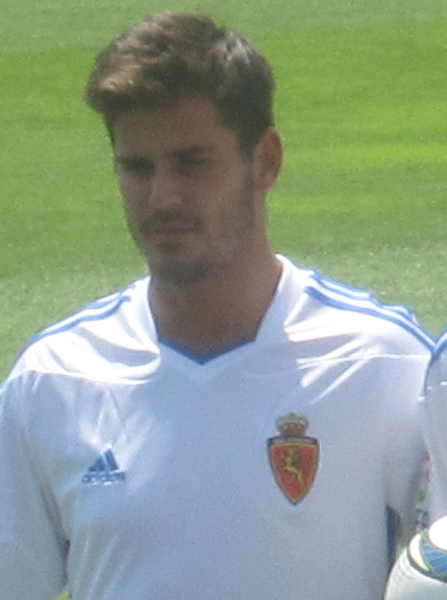
- Oriol being presented at Zaragoza

Personal information
- Full name: Eduard Oriol Gràcia
- Date of birth: 5 November 1986 (age 40)
- Place of birth: Cambrils, Spain
- Height: 1.76 m (5 ft 9 in)
- Position: Winger

Youth career
- 2004–2005: Cambrils

Senior career*
Years	Team	Apps	(Gls)
2005–2008	Pobla Mafumet		
2006–2007	→ Reus (loan)	25	(1)
2008–2009	Sant Andreu	34	(5)
2009–2011	Barcelona B	60	(9)
2011–2013	Zaragoza	39	(2)
2013–2014	Khazar	6	(0)
2014	AEL Limassol	18	(5)
2014–2015	Blackpool	10	(0)
2015	Rapid București	14	(2)
2016	Llagostera	13	(0)
2016–2017	Tenerife	5	(0)
2017–2018	Ibiza	7	(4)
2018–2022	Sanluqueño	97	(12)
2022–2023	Utrera	15	(0)
2023	UCAM Murcia	17	(1)
2023	Xerez Deportivo	3	(0)
Total		363	(41)
- * Club domestic league appearances and goals

Eduard "Edu" Oriol Gràcia (born 5 November 1986) is a Spanish former professional footballer who played as a winger.

== Club career ==
Born in Cambrils, Tarragona, Catalonia, Oriol started playing with amateurs CF Pobla de Mafumet, having a loan spell with CF Reus Deportiu whilst on contract with the former. In the 2008–09 season, still in his native region, he competed in the Segunda División B with UE Sant Andreu.

Oriol moved to FC Barcelona in the summer of 2009, helping the reserves to return to Segunda División by appearing in 29 games and scoring three goals. After once again featuring heavily for Barça B in the 2010–11 campaign, as the team finished in third position – being however ineligible for playoff promotion – he signed for La Liga club Real Zaragoza for three years.

Oriol made his debut in the top flight on 28 August 2011, coming on as a second-half substitute in a 0–6 home loss against Real Madrid. He scored the first of his two goals in the competition on 29 April 2012, opening the 2–0 win over Athletic Bilbao also at the La Romareda; the other came one week later, the only as the hosts defeated Levante UD.

Oriol joined Azerbaijan Premier League's Khazar Lankaran FK in late August 2013 on a two-year contract. following the Aragonese's relegation, He won his first piece of silverware on 23 October, helping his new team to defeat Neftçi PFK in that year's Azerbaijan Supercup.

On 13 January 2014, Oriol's contract with Khazar was cancelled by mutual consent, after he failed to settle in Azerbaijan. The following day, he penned a two-year deal with AEL Limassol in the Cypriot First Division.

On 18 August 2014, Oriol agreed to a one-year contract with the option of a further year with Football League Championship side Blackpool, linking up with his twin brother Joan. His contract was terminated by mutual consent on 12 January 2015, and he moved to the Romanian Liga I with FC Rapid București.

Oriol subsequently returned to his homeland and its second tier, featuring rarely for UE Llagostera and CD Tenerife. In late November 2017, the 31-year-old signed with amateurs UD Ibiza, leaving at the end of the season.

In August 2018, Oriol joined third-division club Atlético Sanluqueño CF; upon arriving, he labelled his former Blackpool manager Lee Clark a "racist". He equalled a career-best six goals in his debut campaign, and was eventually named captain.

== Personal life ==
Oriol's twin brother, Joan, was also a footballer. A defender, he shared teams with his sibling on several occasions.

== Career statistics ==
As of 4 February 2018

Appearances and goals by club, season and competition
Club	Season	League			Cup		Other		Total	
Club	Season	Division	Apps	Goals	Apps	Goals	Apps	Goals	Apps	Goals
Sant Andreu	2008–09	Segunda División B	34	5	2	0	1 (Note: Appearances in Segunda División B play-offs)	0	37	5
Barcelona B	2009–10	Segunda División B	29	3	—		6	0	35	3
Barcelona B	2010–11	Segunda División	31	6	—		—		31	6
Barcelona B	Total		60	9	—		6	0	66	9
Zaragoza	2011–12	La Liga	20	2	2	0	—		22	2
Zaragoza	2012–13	La Liga	19	0	4	0	—		23	0
Zaragoza	Total		39	2	6	0	—		45	2
Khazar	2013–14	Azerbaijan Premier League	6	0	2	0	—		8	0
AEL Limassol	2013–14	Cypriot First Division	18	5	1	0	—		19	5
Blackpool	2014–15	Championship	10	0	0	0	—		10	0
Rapid București	2014–15	Liga I	14	2	0	0	—		14	2
Llagostera	2015–16	Segunda División B	13	0	0	0	—		13	0
Tenerife	2016–17	Segunda División	5	0	0	0	—		5	0
Ibiza	2017–18	Tercera División	6	4	0	0	—		6	4
Career total			205	27	11	0	7	0	223	27

== Honours ==
Khazar

- Azerbaijan Supercup: 2013
