= Rasim Ramaldanov =

Azerbaijani footballer (born 1986)

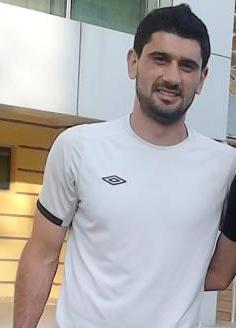

Personal information
- Full name: Rasim Ramaldanov
- Date of birth: 24 January 1986 (age 40)
- Place of birth: Baku, Azerbaijan SSR, Soviet Union
- Height: 1.91 m (6 ft 3 in)
- Position: Centre back

Youth career
- Inter Baku

Senior career*
Years	Team	Apps	(Gls)
2008–2013	Simurq	87	(2)
2013–2015	Khazar Lankaran	51	(1)
2016	Sumgayit	9	(0)
2016	Kolkheti Poti	12	(2)
2017–2021	Gabala	32	(1)

International career^{‡}
2012–2014	Azerbaijan	17	(0)
- * Club domestic league appearances and goals as of 17 July 2021 ‡ National team caps and goals as of 2 April 2015

Rasim Ramaldanov (born 24 January 1986) is an Azerbaijani former professional footballer who played as a defender and is now a coach for Gabala

== Club career ==
Rasim Ramaldanov signed his first professional contract in 2008 at the age of 22 with Simurq PFC. He renewed the contract and became the capitan of this team in 2010. Ramaldanov signed a new two-year contract with Khazar Lankaran in June 2015. In November 2015 Ramaldanov terminated his contract with Khazar Lankaran due to unpaid wages. On 26 January 2016, Ramaldanov signed with Sumgayit. In July 2016 Ramaldanov joined Kolkheti-1913 Poti

On 30 January 2017, Ramaldanov signed for Gabala until the end of the 2016–17 season.

In July 2021, Ramaldanov was appointed as a coach of Gabala.

== Career statistics ==
=== Club ===
As of match played 28 September 2019

Club	Season	League			National Cup		Continental		Other		Total	
Club	Season	Division	Apps	Goals	Apps	Goals	Apps	Goals	Apps	Goals	Apps	Goals
Simurq	2008–09	Azerbaijan Premier League	8	0			-		-		8	0
Simurq	2009–10	Azerbaijan Premier League	11	0	2	0	-		-		13	0
Simurq	2010–11	Azerbaijan Premier League	20	0	0	0	-		-		20	0
Simurq	2011–12	Azerbaijan Premier League	24	2	1	0	-		-		25	2
Simurq	2012–13	Azerbaijan Premier League	24	0	2	0	-		-		26	0
Simurq	Total		87	2	5	0	0	0	0	0	92	2
Khazar Lankaran	2013–14	Azerbaijan Premier League	20	0	4	0	4	0	1	1	29	1
Khazar Lankaran	2014–15	Azerbaijan Premier League	24	1	2	0	-		-		26	1
Khazar Lankaran	2015–16	Azerbaijan Premier League	7	0	0	0	-		-		7	0
Khazar Lankaran	Total		51	1	6	0	4	0	1	1	62	2
Sumgayit	2015–16	Azerbaijan Premier League	9	0	0	0	-		-		9	0
Kolkheti-1913 Poti	2016	Umaglesi Liga	12	2	2	1	-		-		14	3
Gabala	2016–17	Azerbaijan Premier League	6	0	1	0	-		-		7	0
Gabala	2017–18	Azerbaijan Premier League	9	0	2	0	0	0	-		11	0
Gabala	2018–19	Azerbaijan Premier League	12	1	1	0	1	0	-		14	1
Gabala	2019–20	Azerbaijan Premier League	5	0	0	0	2	0	-		7	0
Gabala	2020–21	Azerbaijan Premier League	0	0	0	0	-		-		0	0
Gabala	Total		32	1	4	0	3	0	-	-	39	1
Career total			191	6	17	1	3	0	0	0	216	7

=== National team ===
Azerbaijan national team
Year	Apps	Goals
2012	1	0
2013	10	0
2014	5	0
Total	16	0

As of match played 13 October 2014.

== Honours ==
Khazar Lankaran

- Azerbaijan Supercup: 2013

Gabala

- Azerbaijan Cup: 2018–19
