= Deyvid Sacconi =

Brazilian footballer (born 1987)

Personal information
- Full name: Deyvid Franck Silva Sacconi
- Date of birth: April 10, 1987 (age 39)
- Place of birth: Alfenas, Brazil
- Height: 1.74 m (5 ft 9 in)
- Position: Attacking midfielder

Youth career
- 2004–2005: Guarani

Senior career*
Years	Team	Apps	(Gls)
2006–2007	Guarani	65	(12)
2007–2012	Palmeiras	31	(5)
2010	→ Goiás (loan)	2	(2)
2010	→ Grêmio Barueri (loan)	9	(0)
2011	→ Naútico (loan)	11	(0)
2011	→ Bragantino (loan)	13	(3)
2012	Vegalta Sendai	1	(0)
2013	Bragantino	4	(0)
2013–2014	Khazar Lankaran	13	(2)
2014	ABC	14	(0)
2015	Atlético Sorocaba	21	(8)
2015	Luverdense	16	(4)
2016	Daegu	13	(0)
2016	Esteghlal Khuzestan	5	(0)
2017	São Caetano	2	(0)
2018	Brasil de Pelotas	1	(0)
2019–2020	Brasiliense		
- * Club domestic league appearances and goals as of 20:31, 17 November 2019 (UTC)

Deyvid Franck Silva Sacconi or simply Deyvid Sacconi (born April 10, 1987), is a Brazilian footballer who plays attacking midfield. Due to his Italian ancestry he holds an Italian passport.

== Career ==
In August 2013, Sacconi signed a one-year contract with Khazar Lankaran in the Azerbaijan Premier League.

In September 2014, Sacconi signed for ABC Futebol Clube in the Campeonato Brasileiro Série B.

== Club statistics ==
As of 11 June 2014

Club	Season	League	League		Cup^{1}		League Cup^{2}		Continental^{3}		Total	
Club	Season	League	Apps	Goals	Apps	Goals	Apps	Goals	Apps	Goals	Apps	Goals
Guarani	2006	Série B							-	-		
Guarani	2007	Série C							-	-		
Guarani	Total								-	-		
Palmeiras	2007	Série A	12	0					-	-		
Palmeiras	2008	Série A	0	0					-	-		
Palmeiras	2009	Série A	17	2					-	-		
Palmeiras	2010	Série A	0	0					-	-		
Palmeiras	Total		29	2								
Goiás	2010	Série A	2	0					-	-		
Goiás	Total		2	0					-	-		
Grêmio Barueri	2010	Série A	9	0					2	0		
Grêmio Barueri	Total		9	0					2	0		
Náutico	2011	Série B	1	0					-	-		
Náutico	Total		1	0					-	-		
Bragantino	2011	Série B	13	3					-	-		
Bragantino	Total		13	3					-	-		
Vegalta Sendai	2012	J1 League	1	0	0	0	0	0	-		1	0
Vegalta Sendai	Total		1	0	0	0	0	0	-		1	0
Bragantino	2013	Série B	4	0	1	0			-		5	0
Bragantino	Total		4	0	1	0			-		5	0
Khazar Lankaran	2013-14	Azerbaijan Premier League	13	2	1	0	1	0	0	0	15	2
Khazar Lankaran	Total		13	2	1	0	1	0	0	0	15	2
Career total												

^{1}Includes Emperor's Cup.

^{2}Includes J.League Cup and Azerbaijan Supercup.

^{3}Includes Copa Sudamericana.

== Honours ==
Palmeiras

- São Paulo State League (1) - 2008

Khazar Lankaran

- Azerbaijan Supercup (1) - 2013
