= Nildo (footballer, born 1993) =

Brazilian footballer

Personal information
- Full name: Brito da Silva Josenildo
- Date of birth: August 23, 1993 (age 33)
- Place of birth: Feira de Santana, Brazil
- Height: 1.80 m (5 ft 11 in)
- Position: Midfielder

Team information
- Current team: Kagoshima United FC
- Number: 39

Senior career*
Years	Team	Apps	(Gls)
2013–2016	Avaí FC		
2014	→ Tokyo Verdy (loan)	24	(2)
2015	→ Consadole Sapporo (loan)	13	(0)
2017	EC Taubaté		
2017–2018	Fukushima United FC	41	(10)
2019–	Kagoshima United FC		
- * Club domestic league appearances and goals as of 13 April 2019

Brito da Silva Josenildo (born August 23, 1993), known as Nildo, is a Brazilian footballer for Kagoshima United FC.

== Club statistics ==
Updated to 20 February 2018.

Club performance			League		Cup		Total	
Season	Club	League	Apps	Goals	Apps	Goals	Apps	Goals
Japan			League		Emperor's Cup		Total	
2014	Tokyo Verdy	J2 League	24	2	1	0	25	2
2015	Consadole Sapporo	J2 League	13	0	3	1	16	1
2017	Fukushima United FC	J3 League	12	4	–		12	4
Total			49	6	4	1	53	7
