= Thiego =

Brazilian footballer (1986–2016)

Personal information
- Full name: Willian Thiego de Jesus
- Date of birth: 22 July 1986
- Place of birth: Aracaju, Brazil
- Date of death: 28 November 2016 (aged 30)
- Place of death: La Unión, Colombia
- Height: 1.88 m (6 ft 2 in)
- Position: Centre back

Youth career
- 2004–2006: Sergipe
- 2006–2007: Grêmio

Senior career*
Years	Team	Apps	(Gls)
2006	Sergipe	0	(0)
2007–2012	Grêmio	50	(1)
2010	→ Kyoto Sanga (loan)	10	(0)
2011	→ Bahia (loan)	16	(0)
2012	Ceará	29	(1)
2013	Figueirense	18	(3)
2014	Khazar Lankaran	29	(2)
2015–2016	Chapecoense	68	(8)
Total		240	(15)
- * Club domestic league appearances and goals

Willian Thiego de Jesus (22 July 1986 – 28 November 2016), known as Willian Thiego or simply Thiego, was a Brazilian footballer who played as a centre back. He was one of the victims when LaMia Airlines Flight 2933 crashed on 28 November 2016.

== Club career ==
=== Grêmio ===
Born in Aracaju, Sergipe, Thiego started his career at Sergipe's youth setup, and impressed enough to secure a move to Grêmio in 2006.

Initially assigned to the under-20s, Thiego was promoted to the first team the following year; known as Willian Thiego, he only used the last name due to the presence of Willian Magrão in the squad. He made his Série A debut during the campaign, contributing with 11 appearances.

On 14 June 2008 Thiego scored his top tier goal, a powerful close-range shot in a 3–0 away win against Goiás. He would subsequently appear regularly for the club, also representing the side in 2009 Copa Libertadores.

Thiego was sent on a one-year loan to Kyoto Sanga FC in January 2010. Upon returning, he subsequently served another temporary deal at Bahia before leaving the club.

=== Ceará / Figueirense ===
On 5 March 2012, Thiego was sold to Ceará. He immediately became a regular starter at the club, but was still released on 31 October.

On 16 January 2013, Thiego signed a one-year deal with Figueirense.

=== Khazar Lankaran ===
Following the expiration of his Figueirense contract, Thiego signed an 18-month contract with Khazar Lankaran of the Azerbaijan Premier League on 27 January 2014. He left Khazar Lankaran in December 2014, after having his contract cancelled by the club.

=== Chapecoense ===
In January 2015, Willian Thiego signed for Chapecoense. A backup to Rafael Lima during his first season, he became a regular starter during his second.

On 15 June 2016, Thiego scored a brace in a 3–3 home draw against former club Grêmio.

== Death ==
On 28 November 2016, whilst at the service of Chapecoense, Thiego was among the fatalities of the LaMia Airlines Flight 2933 accident in the Colombian village of Cerro Gordo, La Unión, Antioquia.

== Career statistics ==
As of 27 November 2016

Club	Season	League			State League		Cup		Continental		Other		Total	
Club	Season	Division	Apps	Goals	Apps	Goals	Apps	Goals	Apps	Goals	Apps	Goals	Apps	Goals
Grêmio	2007	Série A	11	0	0	0	0	0	—		—		11	0
Grêmio	2008	Série A	13	1	0	0	0	0	1 (Note: Appearance(s) in Copa Sudamericana)	0	—		14	1
Grêmio	2009	Série A	21	0	5	0	0	0	5 (Note: Appearance(s) in Copa Libertadores)	0	—		31	0
Grêmio	Subtotal		45	1	5	0	0	0	6	0	—		56	1
Kyoto Sanga (loan)	2010	J.League	10	0	—		1	0	—		—		11	0
Bahia (loan)	2011	Série A	5	0	11	0	5	0	—		—		21	0
Ceará (loan)	2012	Série B	17	1	12	0	2	0	—		—		31	1
Figueirense (loan)	2013	Série B	21	3	17	0	5	1	—		—		43	4
Khazar Lankaran	2013–14	Azerbaijan Premier League	14	2	—		4	0	—		—		18	2
Khazar Lankaran	2014	Azerbaijan Premier League	15	0	—		0	0	—		—		15	0
Khazar Lankaran	Subtotal		29	0	—		4	0	—		—		33	2
Chapecoense	2015	Série A	13	1	5	0	0	0	4	0	—		22	1
Chapecoense	2016	Série A	33	5	17	2	5	0	7	1	—		62	8
Chapecoense	Subtotal		46	6	22	2	5	0	11	1	—		84	9
Career total			173	13	67	2	22	1	17	1	0	0	279	17

== Honours ==
Grêmio

- Campeonato Gaúcho: 2007

Chapecoense

- Copa Sudamericana: 2016 (posthumously)
