= Vanderson Scardovelli =

Brazilian footballer

Personal information
- Full name: Vanderson Scardovelli
- Date of birth: 27 September 1984 (age 42)
- Place of birth: Dracena, Brazil
- Height: 1.76 m (5 ft 9 in)
- Position: Left back

Senior career*
Years	Team	Apps	(Gls)
2004–2007	Corinthians	0	(0)
2005	→ Mauaense (loan)		
2006	→ Ituano (loan)	5	(1)
2007	→ São Bento (loan)	12	(1)
2007–2009	Campo Grande	0	(0)
2007	→ Siena (loan)	0	(0)
2008	→ Martina (loan)	11	(0)
2008–2009	→ Treviso (loan)	5	(0)
2009–2012	PAS Giannina	73	(2)
2012–2014	Khazar Lankaran	64	(0)
2015	Paulista	8	(1)
2015–2018	Platanias	75	(1)
2018–2020	Lamia	57	(0)
2020–2021	Panetolikos	18	(0)
2022	Panserraikos	11	(0)
- * Club domestic league appearances and goals as of 1 May 2022

Vanderson Scardovelli (born 27 September 1984) is a Brazilian professional footballer who plays as a left back.

== Club career ==
Vanderson started his career at Corinthians, he signed a three-year contract on 5 April 2004.

He was on loan to Ituano of Brazilian Série B, and São Bento of Campeonato Paulista.

On 10 July 2007, he signed a one-year contract with Campo Grande of Campeonato Carioca Terceira Divisão, which de facto associated with his agent Pedrinho VRP.

On 23 August 2007, he was on loan to Siena, and then spent other loan spells in Italy with Martina and Treviso.

In the summer of 2012 Vanderson signed for Azerbaijan Premier League side Khazar Lankaran on a one-year contract. Vanderson won his first piece of silverware with Khazar on 23 October 2013, after helping them to victory over Neftchi Baku in the 2013 Azerbaijan Supercup. Vanderson left Khazar Lankaran in December 2014, after having his contract cancelled by the club.

After being released by Khazar Lankaran, Vanderson signed a short-term contract with Brazilian side Paulista.

== Career statistics ==
As of 27 December 2014

Club statistics
Season	Club	League	League		Cup		Continental		Other (Note: Includes other competitive competitions, including the Azerbaijan Supercup)		Total	
Season	Club	League	App	Goals	App	Goals	App	Goals	App	Goals	App	Goals
2009–10	PAS Giannina	Super League Greece	22	0	2	0	-		-		24	0
2010–11	PAS Giannina	Football League	29	2	2	0	-		-		31	2
2011–12	PAS Giannina	Super League Greece	22	0	1	0	-		-		23	0
2012–13	Khazar Lankaran	Azerbaijan Premier League	18	0	6	0	0	0	-		24	0
2013–14	Khazar Lankaran	Azerbaijan Premier League	30	0	4	0	2	0	1	0	37	0
2014–15	Khazar Lankaran	Azerbaijan Premier League	15	0	0	0	-		-		15	0
Total	Greece		73	2	5	0	0	0	0	0	78	2
Total	Azerbaijan		63	0	10	0	2	0	1	0	76	0
Total			136	2	15	0	2	0	1	0	154	2

== Honours ==
- Khazar Lankaran
  - Azerbaijan Supercup: 2013
