= Mbilla Etame =

Cameroonian footballer (born 1988)

Personal information
- Full name: Serges Flavier Mbilla Etame
- Date of birth: 22 June 1988 (age 38)
- Place of birth: Abengue, Cameroon
- Height: 1.80 m (5 ft 11 in)
- Position: Forward

Senior career*
Years	Team	Apps	(Gls)
2006–2008	Union Douala		
2008–2013	Adanaspor	145	(62)
2013–2014	Khazar Lankaran	35	(11)
2014–2015	Samsunspor	35	(15)
2015–2017	Antalyaspor	49	(11)
2017–2019	Alanyaspor	19	(4)
2020	Adanaspor	11	(3)
2020–2021	Ankaraspor	5	(1)
- * Club domestic league appearances and goals as of 12 February 2021

Serges Flavier Mbilla Etame (22 June 1988), also known as Mbilla Etame, is a Cameroonian professional footballer who plays as a forward.

== Club career ==
Etame joined Antalyaspor on a two-year contract on 7 July 2015. He scored his first Süper Lig goal with a header shot, in second match-day game against Gençlerbirliği that ended 3–1 for Antalyaspor, on 23 August 2015. He scored his second goal in the final minutes of the twelfth match-day game against Galatasaray and helped his team to win one point in the 3–3 draw on 21 November 2015. On 12 December 2015, he scored the first equalizer for Antalyaspor while they were 1–0 down against Mersin İdman Yurdu, which was his third league goal of the season. The game ended 3–2 in favour of Antalyaspor.

== International career ==
Etame was named in Cameroon's squad for a friendly against France in May 2016.

== Career statistics ==
=== Club ===
As of match played 27 August 2018.

Appearances and goals by club, season and competition
Club	Season	League			National Cup		Continental		Other		Total	
Club	Season	Division	Apps	Goals	Apps	Goals	Apps	Goals	Apps	Goals	Apps	Goals
Adanaspor	2008-09	TFF First League	23	10	1	1	-		-		24	11
Adanaspor	2009-10	TFF First League	28	8	0	0	-		3 (Note: Appearances in the Süper Lig promotion playoffs)	0	31	8
Adanaspor	2010-11	TFF First League	30	17	1	0	-		-		31	17
Adanaspor	2011-12	TFF First League	30	12	2	0	-		3	3	35	15
Adanaspor	2012-13	TFF First League	28	12	0	0	-		-		28	12
Adanaspor	Total		145	62	4	1	-	-	6	3	149	63
Khazar Lankaran	2013–14	Azerbaijan Premier League	32	11	3	3	-		-		35	14
Khazar Lankaran	2014–15	Azerbaijan Premier League	3	0	0	0	-		-		3	0
Khazar Lankaran	Total		35	11	3	3	-	-	-	-	38	14
Samsunspor	2014–15	TFF First League	32	11	0	0	-		3	4	35	11
Antalyaspor	2015–16	Süper Lig	21	7	6	3	-		-		27	10
Antalyaspor	2016–17	Süper Lig	28	4	1	0	-		-		29	4
Antalyaspor	Total		49	11	7	3	-	-	-	-	56	14
Alanyaspor	2017–18	Süper Lig	18	4	1	0	-		-		19	4
Alanyaspor	2018–19	Süper Lig	1	0	0	0	-		-		1	0
Alanyaspor	Total		19	4	1	0	-	-	-	-	20	14
Career total			280	99	15	7	-	-	9	7	208	106

== Achievements ==
=== Individual ===
- TFF First League Top Scorer (1): 2010–11
