= Rafael Lima (footballer) =

Brazilian footballer

Personal information
- Full name: Rafael Ramos de Lima
- Date of birth: 8 March 1986 (age 40)
- Place of birth: Florianópolis, Brazil
- Height: 1.83 m (6 ft 0 in)
- Position: Centre back

Team information
- Current team: Hercílio Luz

Youth career
- 2001–2006: Figueirense

Senior career*
Years	Team	Apps	(Gls)
2006–2009	Figueirense	14	(0)
2006	→ Atlético Sorocaba (loan)		
2008	→ Ceará (loan)	0	(0)
2009–2010	Al Sharjah	40	(3)
2011	Internacional-SM	4	(0)
2011	Hercílio Luz	14	(1)
2012–2016	Chapecoense	109	(1)
2017–2018	América Mineiro	41	(4)
2019–2020	Coritiba	28	(3)
2021	Paraná	13	(0)
2021	Guarani-SC		
2021	Caxias	13	(0)
2022	Hercílio Luz		
2022	Atlético Catarinense		
2023–	Hercílio Luz	13	(3)
- * Club domestic league appearances and goals as of 6 August 2023

Rafael Ramos de Lima (born 8 March 1986), known as Rafael Lima, is a Brazilian footballer who plays for Hercílio Luz as a central defender.

== Club career ==
Rafael Lima was born in Florianópolis, Santa Catarina, and spent his youth career at Figueirense. Making his debut as a senior while on loan at Atlético Sorocaba in 2006, he made his Série A debut on 20 May 2007 by starting in a 1–2 away loss against Palmeiras.

Rafael Lima spent another temporary deal at Ceará in 2008 before being released by Figueira in June 2009. He subsequently moved abroad, joining UAE Arabian Gulf League club Al-Sharjah SCC.

Returning to Brazil in 2010, Rafael Lima spent nine months unemployed before joining Internacional de Santa Maria for 2011 Campeonato Gaúcho. In December 2011, after a short stint at Hercílio Luz, he signed for Chapecoense.

Rafael Lima was an undisputed starter during Chapecoense's consecutive promotions in 2012 and 2013, being a captain during the process. He scored his first goal in the main category of Brazilian football on 3 August 2014, netting the game's only in a home success over Flamengo.

Rafael Lima was not on board the ill-fated LaMia Airlines Flight 2933 that crashed on 28 November 2016, and killed 19 of his teammates. On 24 December, he was released by the club.

In 2017 He plays for América Mineiro

== Career statistics ==
As of 15 April 2018

Club	Season	League			State League		Cup		Continental		Other		Total	
Club	Season	Division	Apps	Goals	Apps	Goals	Apps	Goals	Apps	Goals	Apps	Goals	Apps	Goals
Figueirense	2007	Série A	9	0	6	0	—		0	0	—		14	0
Figueirense	2008	Série A	4	0	4	0	—		—		—		8	0
Figueirense	2009	Série B	1	0	1	0	—		—		—		2	0
Figueirense	Subtotal		14	0	10	0	0	0	0	0	—		24	0
Ceará (loan)	2008	Série B	0	0	8	0	0	0	—		—		8	0
Internacional-SM	2011	Gaúcho	—		4	0	—		—		—		4	0
Hercílio Luz	2011	Catarinense Série B	—		14	1	—		—		—		14	1
Chapecoense	2012	Série C	12	0	4	1	—		—		—		16	1
Chapecoense	2013	Série B	35	0	21	1	—		—		—		56	1
Chapecoense	2014	Série A	32	1	19	1	3	1	—		—		54	3
Chapecoense	2015	Série A	24	0	18	0	2	0	2 (Note: Appearance(s) in Copa Sudamericana)	0	—		46	0
Chapecoense	2016	Série A	6	0	7	0	6	1	1	0	—		20	1
Chapecoense	Subtotal		109	1	65	3	11	2	3	0	—		188	6
América Mineiro	2017	Série B	37	4	12	2	2	0	—		2 (Note: Appearance(s) in Primeira Liga)	0	53	6
América Mineiro	2018	Série A	1	0	14	0	0	0	—		—		15	0
América Mineiro	Subtotal		38	4	26	2	2	0	—		2	0	68	6
Career total			161	5	127	6	13	2	3	0	2	0	306	13
