= Vjekoslav Tomić =

Croatian footballer

Personal information
- Full name: Vjekoslav Tomić
- Date of birth: 19 July 1983 (age 43)
- Place of birth: Split, SFR Yugoslavia
- Height: 1.90 m (6 ft 3 in)
- Position: Goalkeeper

Youth career
- RNK Split

Senior career*
Years	Team	Apps	(Gls)
2002–2003	RNK Split		
2003–2007	Međimurje	58	(0)
2007–2010	Hajduk Split	13	(0)
2010–2013	Karabükspor	78	(0)
2013–2014	Sheriff Tiraspol	3	(0)
2014–2015	Khazar Lankaran	21	(0)
2016	Koper	12	(0)
2016–2017	Şanlıurfaspor	9	(0)
- * Club domestic league appearances and goals as of 24 April 2018

Vjekoslav Tomić (born 19 July 1983) is a Croatian football goalkeeper who most recently played for Turkish club Şanlıurfaspor.

== Career ==
On 13 January 2014 Tomić signed for Khazar Lankaran in the Azerbaijan Premier League on a one-year contract.

== Career statistics ==
As of 16 May 2015.

Club statistics
Season	Club	League	League		Cup		Other		Total	
Season	Club	League	App	Goals	App	Goals	App	Goals	App	Goals
2003–04	Međimurje	Druga HNL	16	0			—		16	0
2004–05	Međimurje	Prva HNL	11	0			—		11	0
2005–06	Međimurje	Prva HNL	5	0			—		5	0
2006–07	Međimurje	Prva HNL	26	0			—		26	0
2007–08	Hajduk Split	Prva HNL	10	0			1	0	11	0
2008–09	Hajduk Split	Prva HNL	2	0			1	0	3	0
2009–10	Hajduk Split	Prva HNL	1	0			0	0	1	0
2010–11	Karabükspor	Süper Lig	33	0	0	0	—		33	0
2011–12	Karabükspor	Süper Lig	22	0	1	0	—		23	0
2012–13	Karabükspor	Süper Lig	23	0	0	0	—		23	0
2013–14	Sheriff Tiraspol	Divizia Naţională	3	0	0	0	10	0	13	0
2013–14	Khazar Lankaran	Azerbaijan Premier League	6	0	1	0	0	0	7	0
2014–15	Khazar Lankaran	Azerbaijan Premier League	15	0	1	0	0	0	16	0
Total	Croatia		71	0			2	0	73	0
Total	Turkey		78	0	1	0	0	0	79	0
Total	Moldova		3	0	0	0	10	0	13	0
Total	Azerbaijan		21	0	2	0	0	0	23	0
Career total			173	0	3	0	12	0	188	0
