= Álvaro Silva (footballer) =

Filipino footballer (born 1984)

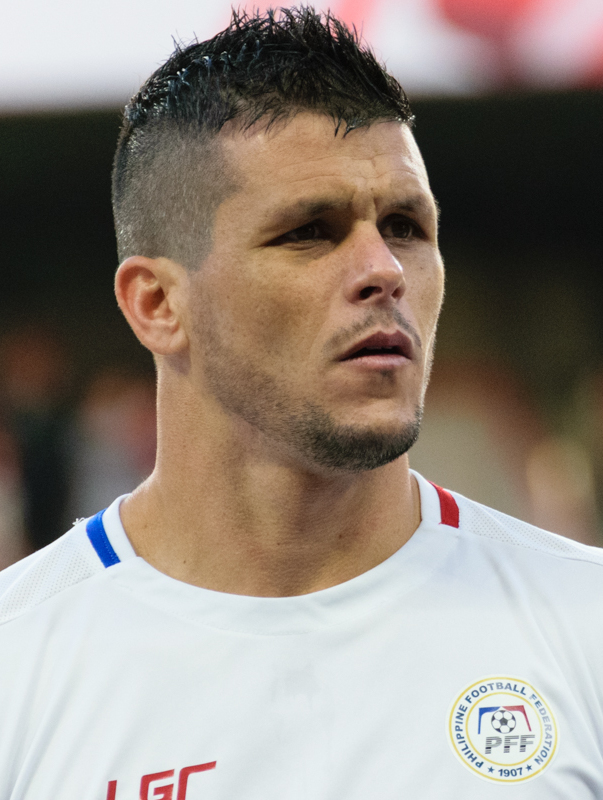
- Silva playing for Philippines at the 2019 Asian Cup

Personal information
- Full name: Alvaro Linares Silva
- Birth name: Álvaro Silva Linares
- Date of birth: March 30, 1984 (age 42)
- Place of birth: Andújar, Spain
- Height: 1.87 m (6 ft 2 in)
- Position: Centre-back

Youth career
- Marbella
- Vázquez Cultural
- Málaga

Senior career*
Years	Team	Apps	(Gls)
2000–2006	Málaga B	58	(0)
2003–2004	→ Marbella (loan)	34	(0)
2006–2009	Málaga	46	(1)
2008–2009	→ Xerez (loan)	19	(0)
2009–2011	Cádiz	60	(1)
2011–2013	Xerez	13	(1)
2012	→ Petrolul Ploiești (loan)	8	(0)
2013–2014	Khazar	41	(1)
2014–2015	Al-Qadsia	0	(0)
2015–2016	Daejeon Citizen	22	(0)
2017	Hanoi	14	(4)
2018	Kedah	13	(0)
2019	Ceres–Negros	0	(0)
2019–2021	BG Pathum United	0	(0)
2019	→ Suphanburi (loan)	13	(1)
2021–2022	Antequera	3	(0)

International career^{‡}
2014–2019	Philippines	17	(0)
- * Club domestic league appearances and goals as of 06:28, December 19, 2021 (UTC) ‡ National team caps and goals as of 16:11, November 19, 2019 (UTC)

Alvaro Linares Silva (born March 30, 1984) is a former professional footballer who played as a centre-back. Born in Spain, he represented the Philippines national team.

He played for clubs in Spain, Romania, Azerbaijan, Kuwait, South Korea, Vietnam, Malaysia, Philippines and Thailand during his senior career, notably amassing Segunda División totals of 165 matches and two goals at the service of Málaga B, Málaga, Xerez (two spells) and Cádiz.

== Club career ==
Silva was born in Andújar, Jaén. After one loan, he made his senior debut with Atlético Malagueño, appearing in two second division seasons and being relegated in the latter. His first contact with the first team came in 2006–07, also in the second level (33 games, one goal).

In 2008–09, Silva was loaned by Málaga for a second time, to another Andalusian side, Xerez CD, appearing relatively as they achieved a first-ever La Liga promotion. On 16 July 2009 he returned to Málaga, being immediately released and joining neighbors Cádiz CF in the second level for three years. A starter through most of the campaign, he suffered relegation this time.

Silva returned to division two and Xerez in the summer of 2011. After only one league appearance in the first half of the season, however, he moved abroad and penned a six-month contract with Liga I club FC Petrolul Ploiești.

In January 2013, Silva signed an 18-month deal with Khazar Lankaran FK of the Azerbaijan Premier League. He won his second piece of silverware on 23 October of that year, featuring against Neftchi Baku PFK in the Azerbaijan Supercup.

After his stint in Azerbaijan, Silva turned down offers from clubs in Israel, Qatar and Spain which included Marbella FC, in favor of Kuwaiti Premier League's Qadsia SC. On 30 August 2016, he left Daejeon Citizen FC and began training with Indonesian club Arema Cronus F.C. who was poised to sign him pending a successful medical, but eventually nothing came of it.

Silva joined V.League 1 side Hanoi FC on 21 December 2016, for one year.

== International career ==
In early 2014, Silva started work on getting his Filipino passport as his paternal grandmother was Filipino. so he would be eligible to play for the Philippines national team. By mid-June, he arrived in Manila to further process his documents.

Silva made his international debut on October 31, 2014, coming on as a substitute in a 3–0 friendly win against Nepal.

== Personal life ==
Silva was born to Spanish parents – his father being of Filipino descent– and traces his Filipino roots to Cavite and Iloilo. Silva belongs to a family of footballers, his younger brother Enrique, played for Malaga B, his cousin Kike Linares – who is also a Philippines international and Nacho Linares.

== Club statistics ==
As of 19 December 2021

Club	Season	League			Cup		Other		Total	
Club	Season	Division	Apps	Goals	Apps	Goals	Apps	Goals	Apps	Goals
Málaga B	2004–05	Segunda División B	36	0	—		—		36	0
Málaga B	2005–06	Segunda División B	22	0	—		—		22	0
Málaga B	Total		58	0	—		—		58	0
Marbella (loan)	2003–04	Segunda División B	34	0	—		—		34	0
Málaga	2004–05	La Liga	0	0	1	0	—		1	0
Málaga	2005–06	Segunda División	0	0	0	0	—		0	0
Málaga	2006–07	Segunda División	33	1	5	0	—		38	1
Málaga	2007–08	Segunda División	13	0	3	0	—		16	0
Málaga	Total		46	1	9	0	—		55	1
Xerez (loan)	2008–09	Segunda División	20	0	1	0	—		21	0
Cádiz	2009–10	Segunda División	28	0	0	0	—		28	0
Cádiz	2010–11	Segunda División B	32	1	1	0	2 (Note: Appearances in Promotion Play-offs)	0	35	1
Cádiz	Total		58	1	1	0	2	0	61	1
Xerez	2011–12	Segunda División	1	0	1	0	—		2	0
Xerez	2012–13	Segunda División	12	1	1	0	—		13	1
Xerez	Total		13	1	2	0	—		15	1
Petrolul Ploiești (loan)	2011–12	Liga I	8	0	0	0	—		8	0
Khazar	2012–13	Azerbaijan Premier League	11	1	4	0	—		15	1
Khazar	2013–14	Azerbaijan Premier League	30	0	3	1	3 (Note: Appearances in UEFA Europa League)	0	36	1
Khazar	Total		41	1	7	1	3	0	51	2
Al-Qadsia	2014–15	Kuwaiti Premier League					5 (Note: Appearances in AFC Cup)	0	5	0
Daejeon Citizen	2015	K League Classic	7	0	0	0	—		7	0
Daejeon Citizen	2016	K League Challenge	15	0	1	0	—		16	0
Daejeon Citizen	Total		22	0	1	0	—		23	0
Hanoi	2017	V.League 1	14	4	0	0	5 (Note: Appearances in AFC Cup and AFC Champions League)	0	19	4
Kedah	2018	Malaysia Super League	13	0	2	0	6 (Note: Appearances in Malaysia Cup)	0	21	0
BG Pathum United	2019	Thai League 1	0	0	0	0	—		0	0
BG Pathum United	2020	Thai League 1	0	0	0	0	—		0	0
BG Pathum United	Total		0	0	0	0	—		0	0
Suphanburi (loan)	2019	Thai League 1	13	1	0	0	—		13	1
Antequera	2021–22	Segunda División RFEF	3	0	0	0	—		3	0
Career total			346	9	23	1	21	0	390	10

== Honours ==
Xerez

- Segunda División: 2008–09

Khazar

- Azerbaijan Supercup: 2013
- Azerbaijan Cup runner-up: 2012–13

Al-Qadsia

- Kuwait Super Cup: 2014
- AFC Cup: 2014

BG Pathum United

- Thai League 1: 2020–21

Individual

- AFF Championship Best Eleven: 2018
