= Khazar Lankaran Central Stadium =

Stadium in Lankaran, Azerbaijan

Coordinates: 38.7472°N 48.8571°E

- Fırtınalar meydanı (Arena of Storms)
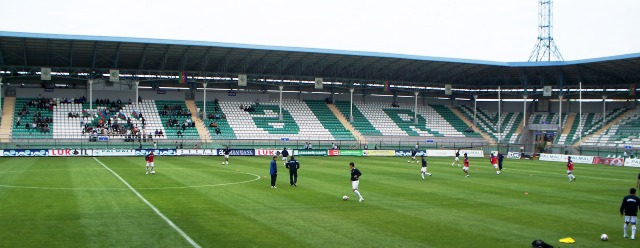
- Interactive map of Khazar Lankaran Central Stadium
- Location: Lankaran, Azerbaijan
- Owner: Mubariz Mansimov
- Operator: Khojat Hajiyev
- Capacity: 15,000
- Surface: Grass

Construction
- Built: August 11, 2006
- Cost: $150 million

Tenants
- Khazar Lankaran (formerly); Azerbaijan national team

Khazar Lankaran Central Stadium (Azerbaijani: Xəzər Lənkəran Mərkəzi Stadionu) is a multi-use stadium in Lankaran, Azerbaijan. It is currently used mostly for football matches. The stadium holds 15,000 people and opened in 2006. The stadium also known as Fırtınalar meydanı (Arena of Storms).

On 17 July 2009, UEFA approved the stadium for usage during international football matches. The stadium hosted its first senior international match on 5 September 2009, between Azerbaijan and Finland.

The stadium was one of the venues for the group stages of the 2012 FIFA U-17 Women's World Cup. Two Group matches were played there.

== Azerbaijan national football team matches ==
The following national team matches were held in the stadium.

Date	Time (CEST)	Team #1	Res.	Team #2	Round	Attendance
5 September 2009	20:00	Azerbaijan	1–2	Finland	2010 FIFA World Cup qualifying	12,000

== See also ==
- List of football stadiums in Azerbaijan
