= Mübariz Mansimov =

Azerbaijani businessperson (born 1968)

Mubariz Mansimov
- Born: March 22, 1968 (age 57); Masallı, Azerbaijan
- Citizenship: Azerbaijan Turkey
- Occupations: Businessman entrepreneur
- Known for: Palmali Group of Companies; Khazar Lankaran
- Spouse: Tamara Gurbanoglu (m. 2000–2014)
- Children: Mubariz Mansimov (Gurbanoğlu), Begim Mansimov (Gurbanoğlu), Nushabe Mansimov (Gurbanoğlu), Mecit Mansimov (Gurbanoğlu)
- Awards: Businessman of the year in Turkey
- Website: Palmali Group of Companies Website

Mubariz Mansimov (Azerbaijani: Mübariz Mənsimov, legally Mubariz Gurbanoghlu; born March 22, 1968) is an Azerbaijani businessperson who is the founder of Palmali Group of Companies, a shipping company, as well of the Azerbaijani football club Khazar Lankaran. He became a naturalized Turkish citizen in 2006. He has invested heavily in Turkey and once owned Yalikavak Marina, previously named Palmarina Yalikavak.

== Early life ==
Mansimov was born in Masallı, Azerbaijan in 1968, to a working-class family. He graduated from the Naval Academy in Baku. He was also a former sailor and he still owns some antique weapons consisting of more than 400 pieces, which are displayed in his offices in Istanbul.

== Business career ==
Mansimov's Palmali Group of Companies comprises television channel "Palhaber" and radio "PAL FM" & PAL STATION.

As of 2009 he owned the nationally successful Azerbaijani football club Khazar Lankaran, which made important contributions to the local region. Also he has a milk company named PALSUD.

Mansimov became a naturalized Turkish citizen in 2006. He has invested heavily in Turkey and once owned Yalikavak Marina, previously named Palmarina Yalikavak.

== Trivia ==
- He is also known to be a fan of Beşiktaş.
