= Nakhchivan City Stadium =

Azerbaijan sports stadium

Coordinates: 39.2089°N 45.4122°E

- Interactive map of Nakhchivan City Stadium
- Location: Nakhchivan City, Azerbaijan
- Capacity: 12,800
- Surface: Grass
- Field size: 104x67

Construction
- Built: 2013

Tenant
- Araz PFK

Nakhchivan City Stadium is a multi-purpose stadium in Nakhchivan City, Azerbaijan. It is currently used mostly for football matches and is the home stadium of Araz PFK. The stadium holds 12,800 people. For the stadium's first game, the announced attendance was 4,000.

== See also ==
- List of football stadiums in Azerbaijan
- Vugar Abbasov
