= Azerbaijan Supercup =

- Founded: 1993 (Inactive 1996–2012); 2013
- Region: Azerbaijan
- Teams: 2
- Current champions: Khazar Lankaran (1st title)
- Most championships: Neftchi Baku (2 titles)
- Broadcaster: Idman Azerbaijan TV

The Azerbaijan Supercup (Azerbaijani: Azərbaycan Milli Futbol Superkuboku) was a football competition, held at the beginning of each domestic season and disputed between the winners of the Azerbaijan Premier League and the winners of the Azerbaijan Cup. It was held in 1993–1995 period as "Sahar" Supercup. From 1996 the competition became inactive. The competition was reestablished in 2013, although it is not held since.

== History ==
Neftchi Baku holds the record for winning the Supercup the most times, winning it two times since the competition began in 1993. In 1994, Qarabağ were awarded automatically with the Supercup after the team won both the domestic title and the Azerbaijan Cup.

In 2013, the Professional Football League of Azerbaijan decided to restore the Azerbaijan Supercup.

Khazar Lankaran were the first winners of the restored Supercup.

== Winners ==
Year	Winner	Score	Finalist
1993	Neftchi Baku	4–1	İnşaatçı Baku
1994	Qarabağ	Qarabağ won the Double.	
1995	Neftchi Baku	1–1 (8–7 pen.)	Turan
~~1996~~	No Competition. Neftchi Baku (Premier League and Azerbaijan Cup)		
~~1998~~	No Competition. Kapaz (Premier League and Azerbaijan Cup)		
~~2004~~	No Competition. Neftchi Baku (Premier League and Azerbaijan Cup)		
~~2007~~	No Competition. Khazar Lankaran (Premier League and Azerbaijan Cup)		
2013	Khazar Lankaran	2–1	Neftchi Baku
~~2014~~	Not Played. Qarabağ (Premier League) and Neftchi Baku (Azerbaijan Cup)		

== Total Titles ==
Club	Titles	Runners-up
Neftchi Baku	2	1
Qarabağ	1	–
Khazar Lankaran	1	–
Turan	–	1
İnşaatçı Baku	–	1

== See also ==
- Azerbaijan Premier League
- Azerbaijan Cup
