= 2009–10 FK Khazar Lankaran season =

Khazar Lankaran
2009-10 season
- President: Mubariz Mansimov
- Manager: Agaselim Mirjavadov
- Stadium: Lankaran City Stadium
- Premier League: 4th
- Azerbaijan Cup: Runners-Up
- Top goalscorer: League: Two Players (9); All: Mario Sergio (13)
Home colours	Away colours

The Khazar Lankaran 2009–10 season is Khazar Lankaran's fifth Azerbaijan Premier League season. It was Khazar's first season under Agaselim Mirjavadov. Khazar finished the season in 4th place and where runners-up in the Azerbaijan Cup.

== Squad ==
Note: Flags indicate national team as defined under FIFA eligibility rules; some limited exceptions apply. Players may hold more than one non-FIFA nationality.

No.	Pos.	Nation	Player
1	GK	AZE	Dmitriy Kramarenko
3	DF	ALB	Elvin Beqiri
4	DF	EST	Tihhon Šišov
5	MF	BRA	Diego Souza
6	DF	CZE	Tomas Ineman
7	DF	AZE	Ruslan Poladov
8	MF	BRA	Juninho
9	FW	BUL	Ivan Tsvetkov
10	MF	AZE	Jeyhun Sultanov
12	FW	HON	Allan Lalín
14	MF	AZE	Rahid Amirguliev
15	FW	NGR	Emeka Opara

No.	Pos.	Nation	Player
17	MF	AZE	Ramazan Abbasov
18	MF	AZE	Alim Gurbanov
20	FW	MDA	Denis Calincov
21	MF	BUL	Radomir Todorov
23	MF	AZE	Nizami Hajiyev
25	GK	AZE	Kamran Agayev
28	MF	BRA	Cristian
30	MF	BRA	Mario Sergio
32	GK	AZE	Zabit Safarov
72	MF	TUR	Devran Ayhan
77	DF	SVK	Ivan Pecha

== Transfers ==
=== Summer ===
In: Note: Flags indicate national team as defined under FIFA eligibility rules; some limited exceptions apply. Players may hold more than one non-FIFA nationality.

No.	Pos.	Nation	Player
6	DF	CZE	Tomas Ineman (from (Czech Republic) Slovácko)
12	FW	HON	Allan Lalín (from (Honduras) Real España)
15	FW	NGR	Emeka Opara (from (Tunisia) Étoile du Sahel)
17	MF	AZE	Ramazan Abbasov (from (Azerbaijan) Baku)
20	FW	MDA	Denis Calincov (from (Moldova) Academia Chişinău)
23	MF	AZE	Nizami Hajiyev (from (Azerbaijan) Olimpik-Shuvalan)
32	GK	AZE	Zabit Safarov (from (Azerbaijan) Olimpik-Shuvalan)
77	DF	SVK	Ivan Pecha (from (Romania) Ceahlăul Piatra Neamţ)

Out: Note: Flags indicate national team as defined under FIFA eligibility rules; some limited exceptions apply. Players may hold more than one non-FIFA nationality.

No.	Pos.	Nation	Player
2	DF	TUR	Göksel Akinci (to (Turkey) Sarıyer)
5	MF	AZE	Emin Quliyev
6	DF	AZE	Fizuli Mammadov
11	FW	BRA	Rômulo (to (Brazil) Ceará)
12	GK	AZE	Ramiz Kerimov
19	DF	BUL	Kostadin Dzhambazov (to (Bulgaria) Neftochimic)
20	FW	ROU	Claudiu Răducanu (to (Spain) Unió Esportiva Poble Sec)
23	DF	LTU	Audrius Veikutis (to (Finland) Atlantis)
27	MF	AZE	Rashad Abdullayev (to (Azerbaijan) Neftchi Baku)
34	DF	TUR	Muammer Erdoğdu (to (Azerbaijan) Turan Tovuz)
50	FW	CIV	Yacouba Bamba (to (Azerbaijan) FK Karvan)
60	FW	TUR	Ahmet Dursun (to (Turkey) Adanaspor)
77	FW	POR	Renato Queirós (to (Portugal) Feirense)
—	FW	SWE	Nadir Benchenaa (to (Sweden) Dalkurd)

=== Winter ===
In: Note: Flags indicate national team as defined under FIFA eligibility rules; some limited exceptions apply. Players may hold more than one non-FIFA nationality.

No.	Pos.	Nation	Player
3	DF	ALB	Elvin Beqiri (from (Albania) Vllaznia Shkodër)
4	DF	EST	Tihhon Šišov (from (Estonia) Levadia Tallinn)
28	MF	BRA	Cristian (from (Brazil) Ituano)

Out: Note: Flags indicate national team as defined under FIFA eligibility rules; some limited exceptions apply. Players may hold more than one non-FIFA nationality.

No.	Pos.	Nation	Player
3	DF	BRA	Denis Silva (to (Brazil) Grêmio)
4	DF	TUR	Fatih Sonkaya (to (Turkey) Kayseri Erciyesspor)
19	DF	BUL	Kostadin Dzhambazov (to (Bulgaria) Neftochimic Burgas)

== Competitions ==
=== Azerbaijan Premier League ===
==== Results ====
16 September 2009 1	Khazar Lankaran	Postponed after 11mins	Baku	Lankaran City Stadium
17:00 AZST (UTC+5)		Summary

21 August 2009 2	Khazar Lankaran	1–0	Inter Baku	Lankaran City Stadium
19:00 AZST (UTC+5)	Calincov 85'; Dzhambazov (yellow card) 3' (yellow-red card) 86'	Summary		Attendance: 10,500; Referee: Vusal Aliyev

12 September 2009 4	Khazar Lankaran	1–1	Turan Tovuz	Lankaran City Stadium
18:00 AZST (UTC+5)	Calincov 75'	Summary	Erdoğdu 35'; Onila (red card) 45'	Attendance: 6,500; Referee: Aliyar Agayev

19 September 2009 5	Gabala	1–1	Khazar Lankaran	Gabala City Stadium
17:00 AZST (UTC+5)	Melnyk 88'	Summary	Mario Sergio 26'	Attendance: 4,000; Referee: Fariz Yusifov

26 September 2009 6	Khazar Lankaran	2–0	Mughan	Lankaran City Stadium
18:00 AZST (UTC+5)	Lalín 54', 88'	Summary		Attendance: 8,500; Referee: Vusal Aliyev

17 October 2009 7	Standard	1–2	Khazar Lankaran	Mehdi Huseynzade Stadium
16:00 AZST (UTC+5)	Seturidze 8'	Summary	Lalín 1', 44'	Attendance: 2,500; Referee: Afgan Hamzayev

21 October 2009 3	Olimpik-Shuvalan	1–0	Khazar Lankaran	AZAL Arena
16:00 AZST (UTC+5)	Doroş 29'	Summary		Attendance: 2,500; Referee: Elchin Mämmädov

24 October 2009 8	Khazar Lankaran	3–0	Simurq	Lankaran City Stadium
18:00 AZST (UTC+5)	Lalín 4'; Calincov 24'; Tsvetkov 48'	Summary		Attendance: 6,500; Referee: Azad Mutallimov

30 October 2009 9	Qarabağ	1–0	Khazar Lankaran	Baku^{2}
14:20 AZST (UTC+5)	Aliyev 86'	Summary		Stadium: Tofiq Bahramov Stadium; Attendance: 1,900; Referee: Anar Salmanov

8 November 2009 10	Khazar Lankaran	0–0	Neftchi Baku	Lankaran City Stadium
17:00 AZT (UTC+4)		Summary		Attendance: 12,000; Referee: Rovshan Ahmadov

25 November 2009 1	Khazar Lankaran	1–1	Baku	Lankaran City Stadium
17:00 AZT (UTC+4)	Mario Sergio 52'	Summary	Tijani 44'	Attendance: 8,000; Referee: Anar Salmanov

21 November 2009 11	Karvan	0–2	Khazar Lankaran	Yevlakh Stadium
14:00 AZT (UTC+4)		Summary	Mario Sergio 20'; Calincov 40'	Attendance: 1,500; Referee: Rovshan Ahmadov

29 November 2009 12	Baku	0–3	Khazar Lankaran	Tofig Bakhramov Stadium
14:15 AZT (UTC+4)		Summary	Tsvetkov 57' (pen.), 90+2'; Mario Sergio 90+1'	Attendance: 2,000; Referee: Afgan Hamzayev

6 December 2009 13	Inter Baku	1–1	Khazar Lankaran	Shafa Stadium
17:10 AZT (UTC+4)	Leo Rocha 50'	Summary	Mario Sergio 5'	Attendance: 5,000; Referee: Rovshan Ahmadov

10 December 2009 14	Khazar Lankaran	2–1	Olimpik-Shuvalan	Lankaran City Stadium
16:00 AZT (UTC+4)	Lalín 27'; Camara 63' (o.g.); Mario Sergio (red card) 87'	Summary	Igbekoi 29'	Attendance: 5,000; Referee: Afgan Hamzayev

13 December 2009 15	Turan Tovuz	1–2	Khazar Lankaran	Tovuz City Stadium
14:00 AZT (UTC+4)	Abbasov 63'	Summary	Juninho 54'; Tsvetkov 64'	Attendance: 1,000; Referee: Rasim Mammadov

19 December 2009 16	Khazar Lankaran	1–0	Gabala	Lankaran City Stadium
16:00 AZT (UTC+4)	Amirguliev 52'	Summary		Attendance: 7,000; Referee: Azad Mutallimov

24 December 2009 17	Mughan	1–2	Khazar Lankaran	Salyan Olympic Sport Complex Stadium
14:00 AZT (UTC+4)	Adilović 76'; Huseynov (red card) 84'	Summary	Mario Sergio 33'; Tsvetkov 57'	Attendance: 1,000; Referee: Emrah Ibrahimov

3 February 2010 18	Khazar Lankaran	0–0	Standard	Lankaran City Stadium
16:00 AZT (UTC+4)		Summary		Attendance: 6,000; Referee: Elnur Muradov

9 February 2010 19	Simurq	1–2	Khazar Lankaran	Zaqatala City Stadium
17:00 AZT (UTC+4)	Hunchak 81' (pen.)	Summary	Juninho; Cristian 67'	Attendance: 2,000; Referee: Afgan Hamzayev

13 February 2010 20	Khazar Lankaran	0–0	Qarabağ	Lankaran City Stadium
16:00 AZT (UTC+4)		Summary		Attendance: 5,000; Referee: Anar Salmanov

17 February 2010 21	Neftchi Baku	0–0	Khazar Lankaran	Tofik Bakhramov Stadium
14:00 AZT (UTC+4)		Summary		Attendance: 3,000; Referee: Fariz Yusifov

21 February 2010 22	Khazar Lankaran	3–0	Karvan	Lankaran City Stadium
14:00 AZT (UTC+4)	Qurbanov 12'; Opara 64'; Mario Sergio 71'	Summary		Attendance: 2,000; Referee: Rahim Hasanov

==== League table ====
Pos	Team	Pld	W	D	L	GF	GA	GD	Pts	Qualification
1	Inter Baku	22	15	4	3	36	18	+18	49	Qualification for championship group
2	Khazar Lankaran	22	12	8	2	29	11	+18	44	Qualification for championship group
3	Qarabağ	22	11	9	2	21	12	+9	42	Qualification for championship group
4	Baku	22	10	7	5	22	17	+5	37	Qualification for championship group
5	Gabala	22	10	6	6	24	21	+3	36	Qualification for championship group

Source: Soccerway.com
Rules for classification: 1) points; 2) goal difference; 3) number of goals scored.

=== Azerbaijan Premier League Championship Group ===
==== Results ====
12 March 2010 23	Khazar Lankaran	4–1	Gabala	Lankaran City Stadium
18:00 AZT (UTC+4)	Lalín 22', 59'; Opara 75'; Calincov 90'	Summary	Antić 81'	Attendance: 7,000; Referee: Elnur Muradov

21 March 2010 24	Inter Baku	1–0	Khazar Lankaran	Shafa Stadium
16:10 AZT (UTC+4)	Zlatinov 4' (pen.)	Summary		Attendance: 3,500; Referee: Fariz Yusifov

27 March 2010 25	Khazar Lankaran	0–0	Neftchi Baku	Lankaran City Stadium
18:00 AZT (UTC+4)		Summary		Attendance: 14,000; Referee: Afgan Hamzayev

3 April 2010 26	Khazar Lankaran	2–1	Qarabağ	Lankaran City Stadium
18:00 AZST (UTC+5)	Tsvetkov 45' (pen.); Mario Sergio 54'	Summary	Adamia 62'	Attendance: 12,440; Referee: Anar Salmanov

11 April 2010 27	Baku	1–0	Khazar Lankaran	Tofig Bakhramov Stadium
16:10 AZST (UTC+5)	Fábio 89'	Summary		Attendance: 3,000; Referee: Elchin Mämmädov

17 April 2010 28	Gabala	1–2	Khazar Lankaran	Gabala City Stadium
16:00 AZST (UTC+5)	Stolpa 37'	Summary	Lalín 9'; Opara 53'	Attendance: 3,000; Referee: Rovshan Ahmadov

23 April 2010 29	Khazar Lankaran	2–2	Inter Baku	Lankaran City Stadium
18:00 AZST (UTC+5)	Tsvetkov 44' (pen.); Opara 88'	Summary	Červenka 15'; Poškus 51'	Attendance: 12,000; Referee: Anar Salmanov

1 May 2010 30	Neftchi Baku	0–0	Khazar Lankaran	Tofik Bakhramov Stadium
17:00 AZST (UTC+5)		Summary		Attendance: 4,000; Referee: Vusal Aliyev

9 May 2010 31	Qarabağ	2–1	Khazar Lankaran	Baku^{2}
17:15 AZST (UTC+5)	Sadygov 23'; Aliyev 35'	Summary	Mario Sergio 65'	Stadium: Tofiq Bahramov Stadium; Attendance: 3,000; Referee: Elchin Mämmädov

15 May 2010 32	Khazar Lankaran	0–1	Baku	Lankaran City Stadium
17:15 AZST (UTC+5)		Summary	Šolić 28'	Attendance: 16,000; Referee: Vusal Aliyev

==== Table ====
Pos	Team	Pld	W	D	L	GF	GA	GD	Pts	Qualification
2	Baku	20	7	7	6	19	15	+4	28	Qualification for Europa League second qualifying round (Note: Baku were the winners of the 2009–10 Azerbaijan Cup competition and qualified for the second qualifying round of the UEFA Europa League.)
3	Qarabağ	20	6	9	5	16	18	−2	27 (Note: QAR: 7 pts, 4–3; KHA: 4 pts, 3–4)	Qualification for Europa League first qualifying round
4	Khazar Lankaran	20	6	9	5	19	14	+5	27	Qualification for Europa League first qualifying round
5	Neftçi Baku	20	4	11	5	11	12	−1	23	
6	Gabala	20	4	8	8	18	27	−9	20	

Source: Soccerway.com
Rules for classification: 1) points; 2) head-to-head points; 3) head-to-head goal difference; 4) head-to-head goals scored; 5) goal difference; 6) number of goals scored.

=== Azerbaijan Cup ===
4 November 2009 Last 16 1st Leg	Khazar Lankaran	3–1	Mughan	Lankaran
17:00 AZT (UTC+4)	Mario Sergio 35', 48', 75'	Summary; Summary	Yaméogo 53'	Stadium: Lankaran City Stadium; Referee: Elnur Muradov

11 November 2009 Last 16 2nd Leg	Mughan	0–1 (1–4 agg.)	Khazar Lankaran	Salyan
13:30 AZT (UTC+4)		Summary; Summary	Calincov 81'	Stadium: Salyan Olympic Sport Complex Stadium

7 March 2010 Quarter-Final 1st Leg	Qarabağ	2–1	Khazar Lankaran	Baku^{2}
14:15 AZT (UTC+4)	Sadygov 59'; Teli 90'	Summary	Opara 17'	Stadium: Tofiq Bahramov Stadium; Attendance: 2,000; Referee: Elchin Mämmädov

17 March 2010 Quarter-Final 2nd Leg	Khazar Lankaran	1–0 (2–2 agg.)	Qarabağ	Lankaran
18:00 AZT (UTC+4)	Cristian 17'	Summary	Allahverdiyev (yellow card) 45' (yellow-red card) 65'; Sadygov (red card) 87'	Stadium: Lankaran City Stadium; Attendance: 8,500; Referee: Vusal Aliyev

27 April 2010 Semi-Final 1st Leg	Olimpik-Shuvalan	1–1	Khazar Lankaran	Baku
16:00 AZST (UTC+5)	Gurbanov 73'	Summary	Calincov 23'	Stadium: Shafa Stadium; Attendance: 1,500; Referee: Fariz Yusifov

5 May 2010 Semi-Final 2nd Leg	Khazar Lankaran	2–1 (3–2 agg.)	Olimpik-Shuvalan	Lankaran
18:00 AZST (UTC+5)	Lalín 6'; Mario Sergio 81'	Summary	Bunjevčević 77'	Stadium: Lankaran City Stadium; Attendance: 10,000; Referee: Elnur Muradov

23 May 2010 Final	Baku	2–1 (a.e.t.)	Khazar Lankaran	Baku
20:00 AZST (UTC+5)	Skulić 100'; Šolić 104'	Summary	Beqiri 120'	Stadium: Tofig Bakhramov Stadium; Attendance: 26,000; Referee: Elchin Mämmädov

== Squad statistics ==
=== Appearances and goals ===
No.	Pos	Nat	Player	Total		Premier League		Azerbaijan Cup	
No.	Pos	Nat	Player	Apps	Goals	Apps	Goals	Apps	Goals
1	GK	(Azerbaijan) AZE	Dmitriy Kramarenko	2	0	2+0	0	0+0	0
3	DF	(Albania) ALB	Elvin Beqiri	18	1	14+0	0	4	1
4	DF	(Estonia) EST	Tihhon Šišov	12	0	9+0	0	3	0
5	MF	(Brazil) BRA	Diego Souza	15	0	9+6	0	0+0	0
6	DF	(Czech Republic) CZE	Tomas Ineman	13	0	6+2	0	5	0
8	MF	(Brazil) BRA	Juninho	21	2	14+7	2	0+0	0
7	DF	(Azerbaijan) AZE	Ruslan Poladov	15	0	15+0	0	0+0	0
9	FW	(Bulgaria) BUL	Ivan Tsvetkov	29	7	25+4	7	0	0
10	MF	(Azerbaijan) AZE	Jeyhun Sultanov	12	0	2+10	0	0+0	0
12	FW	(Honduras) HON	Allan Lalín	34	10	21+6	9	7	1
14	MF	(Azerbaijan) AZE	Rahid Amirguliyev	27	1	25+2	1	0+0	0
15	FW	(Nigeria) NGR	Emeka Opara	17	5	13+1	4	3	1
17	MF	(Azerbaijan) AZE	Ramazan Abbasov	13	0	3+6	0	4	0
18	MF	(Azerbaijan) AZE	Alim Gurbanov	10	1	2+8	1	0+0	0
20	FW	(Moldova) MDA	Denis Calincov	31	7	18+7	5	6	2
21	MF	(Bulgaria) BUL	Radomir Todorov	33	0	29+0	0	4	0
23	MF	(Azerbaijan) AZE	Nizami Hajiyev	23	0	10+9	0	4	0
25	GK	(Azerbaijan) AZE	Kamran Agayev	30	0	30+0	0	0+0	0
28	MF	(Brazil) BRA	Cristian	17	2	10+3	1	4	1
30	MF	(Brazil) BRA	Mario Sergio	28	9	22+6	9	0+0	0
72	MF	(Turkey) TUR	Devran Ayhan	28	0	20+5	0	3	0
77	DF	(Slovakia) SVK	Ivan Pecha	38	0	32+0	0	6	0
Players who appeared for Khazar Lankaran who left during the season:
2	DF	(Turkey) TUR	Fatih Sonkaya	3	0	3+0	0	0+0	0
3	DF	(Brazil) BRA	Denis Silva	16	0	15+1	0	0+0	0
19	DF	(Bulgaria) BUL	Kostadin Dzhambazov	4	0	3+1	0	0+0	0

=== Goal scorers ===
Place	Position	Nation	Number	Name	Premier League	Azerbaijan Cup	Total
1	MF	(Brazil)	30	Mario Sergio	9	4	13
2	FW	(Honduras)	12	Allan Lalín	9	1	10
3	FW	(Bulgaria)	9	Ivan Tsvetkov	7	0	7
3	FW	(Moldova)	20	Denis Calincov	5	2	7
5	FW	(Nigeria)	15	Emeka Opara	4	1	5
6	MF	(Brazil)	8	Juninho	2	0	2
6	MF	(Brazil)	28	Cristian	1	1	2
8	DF	(Azerbaijan)	14	Rahid Amirguliev	1	0	1
8	MF	(Azerbaijan)	18	Alim Gurbanov	1	0	1
8	DF	(Albania)	3	Elvin Beqiri	0	1	1
8				Own goal	1	0	1
				TOTALS	40	10	50

=== Disciplinary record ===
Number	Nation	Position	Name	Premier League		Azerbaijan Cup		Total	
Number	Nation	Position	Name	Yellow card	Red card	Yellow card	Red card	Yellow card	Red card
1	(Azerbaijan)	GK	Dmitriy Kramarenko	1	0	0	0	1	0
3	(Albania)	DF	Elvin Beqiri	3	0	0	0	3	0
3	(Brazil)	DF	Denis Silva	2	0	0	0	2	0
4	(Estonia)	DF	Tihhon Šišov	2	0	0	0	2	0
5	(Brazil)	MF	Diego Souza	2	0	0	0	2	0
6	(Czech Republic)	DF	Tomas Ineman	2	0	0	0	2	0
8	(Brazil)	MF	Juninho	2	0	0	0	2	0
9	(Bulgaria)	FW	Ivan Tsvetkov	4	0	0	0	4	0
10	(Azerbaijan)	MF	Jeyhun Sultanov	1	0	0	0	1	0
12	(Honduras)	FW	Allan Lalín	5	0	0	0	5	0
14	(Azerbaijan)	MF	Rahid Amirguliyev	5	0	0	0	5	0
15	(Nigeria)	FW	Emeka Opara	2	0	0	0	2	0
18	(Azerbaijan)	MF	Alim Gurbanov	2	0	0	0	2	0
19	(Bulgaria)	DF	Kostadin Dzhambazov	1	0	0	0	1	0
20	(Moldova)	FW	Denis Calincov	3	0	0	0	3	0
23	(Azerbaijan)	MF	Nizami Hajiyev	2	0	0	0	2	0
25	(Azerbaijan)	GK	Kamran Agayev	4	0	0	0	4	0
28	(Brazil)	MF	Cristian	2	0	0	0	2	0
30	(Brazil)	MF	Mario Sergio	2	1	0	0	2	1
72	(Turkey)	MF	Devran Ayhan	7	0	0	0	7	0
77	(Slovakia)	DF	Ivan Pecha	4	0	0	0	4	0
			TOTALS	58	1	0	0	58	1
