= 2008–09 FK Khazar Lankaran season =

Khazar Lankaran
2008-09 season
- President: Mubariz Mansimov
- Manager: Igor Ponomaryov
- Stadium: Lankaran City Stadium
- Premier League: 4th
- Azerbaijan Cup: Quarterfinals vs Baku
- UEFA Cup: 1st Qualifying Round vs Lech Poznań
- Top goalscorer: League: Ivan Cvetkov (15); All: Ivan Cvetkov (17)
Home colours	Away colours

The Khazar Lankaran 2008–09 season is Khazar Lankaran's fourth Azerbaijan Premier League season. Khazar started the season under the management of Rasim Kara, however he was replaced by Igor Ponomaryov during the season. Khazar finished the season in 4th place and were knocked out of the Azerbaijan Cup at the quarterfinal stage by Baku.

== Squad ==
Note: Flags indicate national team as defined under FIFA eligibility rules; some limited exceptions apply. Players may hold more than one non-FIFA nationality.

No.	Pos.	Nation	Player
1	GK	AZE	Dmitriy Kramarenko
2	DF	TUR	Göksel Akinci
3	DF	BRA	Denis Silva
4	DF	TUR	Fatih Sonkaya
5	DF	AZE	Emin Quliyev
6	DF	AZE	Fizuli Mammedov
7	DF	AZE	Ruslan Poladov
9	FW	BUL	Ivan Tsvetkov
10	MF	AZE	Jeyhun Sultanov
11	FW	BRA	Rômulo
12	GK	AZE	Ramiz Kerimov
13	FW	SWE	Nadir Benchenaa
14	MF	AZE	Rahid Amirguliev
18	MF	AZE	Alim Gurbanov

No.	Pos.	Nation	Player
19	DF	BUL	Kostadin Dzhambazov
20	FW	ROU	Claudiu Răducanu
21	MF	BUL	Radomir Todorov
23	DF	LTU	Audrius Veikutis
25	GK	AZE	Kamran Agayev
27	MF	AZE	Rashad Abdullayev
30	MF	BRA	Mario Sergio
33	MF	BRA	Diego Souza
34	DF	TUR	Muammer Erdoğdu
50	FW	CIV	Yacouba Bamba
55	MF	BRA	Juninho
60	FW	TUR	Ahmet Dursun
72	MF	TUR	Devran Ayhan
77	FW	POR	Renato Queirós

== Transfers ==
=== Summer ===
In: Note: Flags indicate national team as defined under FIFA eligibility rules; some limited exceptions apply. Players may hold more than one non-FIFA nationality.

No.	Pos.	Nation	Player
2	DF	TUR	Göksel Akinci (from (Turkey) Kasımpaşa)
9	FW	BUL	Ivan Tsvetkov (from (Turkey) Sivasspor)
11	FW	BRA	Rômulo (from (Brazil) Fortaleza)
20	FW	ROU	Claudiu Răducanu (from (Romania) Cluj)
21	DF	LTU	Andrius Veikutis (from (Lithuania) Žalgiris Vilnius)
34	DF	TUR	Muammer Erdoğdu (from (Turkey) Galatasaray)
77	FW	POR	Renato Queirós (from (Portugal) Paços de Ferreira)

Out: Note: Flags indicate national team as defined under FIFA eligibility rules; some limited exceptions apply. Players may hold more than one non-FIFA nationality.

No.	Pos.	Nation	Player
4	DF	AZE	Mahir Shukurov (to (Azerbaijan) Olimpik Baku)
8	MF	AZE	Elmar Bakhshiev (to (Azerbaijan) Neftchi Baku)
10	FW	AZE	Zaur Ramazanov (to (Azerbaijan) Qarabağ)
11	MF	AZE	Rashad Kerimov (to (Azerbaijan) Karvan)
—	FW	AZE	Nadir Nabiyev (to (Azerbaijan) Standard Baku)
—	FW	BRA	Roberto Santos (to (Brazil) Gama)

=== Winter ===
In: Note: Flags indicate national team as defined under FIFA eligibility rules; some limited exceptions apply. Players may hold more than one non-FIFA nationality.

No.	Pos.	Nation	Player
4	DF	TUR	Fatih Sonkaya (from (Portugal) Porto)
13	FW	SWE	Nadir Benchenaa (from (Belgium) Union Royale Namur)
60	FW	TUR	Ahmet Dursun (from (Turkey) Kocaelispor)
72	MF	TUR	Devran Ayhan (from (Turkey) Kocaelispor)

Out: Note: Flags indicate national team as defined under FIFA eligibility rules; some limited exceptions apply. Players may hold more than one non-FIFA nationality.

No.	Pos.	Nation	Player

== Competitions ==
=== Azerbaijan Premier League ===
==== Results ====
10 August 2008 1	Karvan	1–0	Khazar Lankaran	Yevlakh
18:00 AZST (UTC+5)	Camara 21' (pen.)	Summary		Stadium: Yevlakh City Stadium; Attendance: 3,000; Referee: Babek Guliyev

24 August 2008 2	Bakili Baku	1–3	Khazar Lankaran	Baku
18:00 AZST (UTC+5)	D.Kokiashvili 90+3'	Summary	Rômulo 30'; Amirguliev 57', 71'	Stadium: Shafa Stadium; Attendance: 500; Referee: Afgan Hamzayev

30 August 2008 3	Khazar Lankaran	2–1	NBC Salyan^{1}	Lankaran
20:00 AZST (UTC+5)	Rômulo 35'; Amirguliev 40'	Summary	Guliev 64'	Stadium: Lankaran City Stadium; Attendance: 7,000; Referee: Jeyhun Hashimov

13 September 2008 4	Khazar Lankaran	5–0	Turan Tovuz	Lankaran
18:00 AZST (UTC+5)	Mario Sergio 14' (pen.), 40'; Rômulo 52'; Tsvetkov 84', 87'	Summary		Stadium: Lankaran City Stadium; Attendance: 8,500; Referee: Elchin Mammadov

20 September 2008 5	Olimpik Baku	0–1	Khazar Lankaran	Baku
18:00 AZST (UTC+5)	Mogaadi (yellow card) 27' (yellow-red card) 65'	Summary	Tsvetkov 35'	Stadium: Shafa Stadium; Attendance: 3,000; Referee: Anar Niyazov

26 September 2008 6	MOIK Baku	0–4	Khazar Lankaran	Baku
17:00 AZST (UTC+5)		Summary	Tsvetkov 30', 34' (pen.), 63', 88'	Stadium: Shafa Stadium; Attendance: 2,500; Referee: Vusal Aliyev

4 October 2008 7	Standard Baku	0–1	Khazar Lankaran	Baku
18:00 AZST (UTC+5)		Summary	Tsvetkov 68'	Stadium: Shafa Stadium; Attendance: 3,000; Referee: Zohrab Gadiyev

19 October 2008 8	Khazar Lankaran	2–0	Neftchi Baku	Lankaran
18:00 AZST (UTC+5)	Tsvetkov 29'; Abdullayev 43'	Summary		Stadium: Lankaran City Stadium; Attendance: 15,000; Referee: Babek Guliyev

26 October 2008 9	Baku	0–0	Khazar Lankaran	Baku
18:00 AZST (UTC+5)		Summary		Stadium: Tofik Bakhramov Stadium; Attendance: 2,000; Referee: Anar Niyazov

9 November 2008 10	Khazar Lankaran	2–4	Inter Baku	Lankaran
18:00 AZT (UTC+4)	Denis 47'; Rômulo 81'	Summary	Rubins 7'; Andaveris 49'; Zlatinov 62'; Abbasov 88'	Stadium: Lankaran City Stadium; Attendance: 6,000; Referee: Anar Niyazov

15 November 2008 11	Gabala	0–1	Khazar Lankaran	Qabala
14:00 AZT (UTC+4)		Summary	Abdullayev 48'	Stadium: Gabala City Stadium; Attendance: 1,000; Referee: Zohrab Gadiyev

23 November 2008 12	Khazar Lankaran	1–3	Qarabağ	Lankaran
18:00 AZT (UTC+4)	Mario Sergio 90+4'	Summary	Javadov 55'; Ramazanov 69'; Şahin 82'	Stadium: Lankaran City Stadium; Attendance: 11,000; Referee: Fariz Yusifov

29 November 2008 13	Simurq	2–2	Khazar Lankaran	Zaqatala
18:00 AZT (UTC+4)	Bolkvadze 32'; Artiukh 61'	Summary	Tsvetkov 43'; Quliyev 90+1'	Stadium: Zaqatala City Stadium; Attendance: 3,000; Referee: Zohrab Gadiyev

15 February 2009 14	Khazar Lankaran	0–0	Karvan	Lankaran
16:00 AZT (UTC+4)		Summary		Stadium: Lankaran City Stadium; Attendance: 10,000; Referee: Vusal Aliyev

21 February 2009 15	Turan Tovuz	0–1	Khazar Lankaran	Tovuz
14:00 AZT (UTC+4)		Summary	Dzhambazov 20'	Stadium: Tovuz City Stadium; Attendance: 6,000; Referee: Rovshan Ahmadov

1 March 2009 16	Khazar Lankaran	5–0	Bakili Baku	Lankaran
14:00 AZT (UTC+4)	Denis 29'; Rômulo 52', 90'; Tsvetkov 67'; Dursun 78'	Summary		Stadium: Lankaran City Stadium; Attendance: 5,000; Referee: Jeyhun Hashimov

8 March 2009 17	Mughan^{1}	1–3	Khazar Lankaran	Salyan
15:00 AZT (UTC+4)	Taranu 73'	Summary	Dzhambazov 15'; Răducanu 47'; Ayhan 53'	Stadium: Salyan Olympic Sport Complex Stadium

14 March 2009 18	Khazar Lankaran	0–0	Olimpik Baku	Lankaran
16:00 AZT (UTC+4)		Summary	Shukurov (yellow card) 15' (yellow-red card) 69'	Stadium: Lankaran City Stadium; Attendance: 6,000; Referee: Vusal Aliyev

21 March 2009 19	Khazar Lankaran	2–0	MOIK Baku	Lankaran
16:00 AZT (UTC+4)	Denis 11'; Tsvetkov 51'	Summary		Stadium: Lankaran City Stadium; Attendance: 8,000; Referee: Rasim Mammadov

5 April 2009 20	Khazar Lankaran	4–0	Standard Baku	Lankaran
15:00 AZST (UTC+5)	Juninho 13'; Tsvetkov 54'; Amirguliev 77'; Mario Sergio 89'	Summary		Stadium: Lankaran City Stadium; Attendance: 7,800; Referee: İmankhan Sultani

12 April 2009 21	Neftchi Baku	2–1	Khazar Lankaran	Baku
19:00 AZST (UTC+5)	Tagizade 10'; A.Cansun 90'	Summary	Dursun 50'	Stadium: Tofig Bakhramov Stadium

18 April 2009 22	Khazar Lankaran	3–0	Baku	Lankaran
18:00 AZST (UTC+5)	Dursun 34', 74'; Mario Sergio 90+3'	Summary		Stadium: Lankaran City Stadium; Attendance: 10,000; Referee: Vusal Aliyev

25 April 2009 23	Inter Baku	2–2	Khazar Lankaran	Baku
16:00 AZST (UTC+5)	Levin 33'; Koļesņičenko 45+1'	Summary	Dzhambazov 74'; Dursun 77'	Stadium: Shafa Stadium; Attendance: 5,000; Referee: Anar Salmanov

3 May 2009 24	Khazar Lankaran	1–2	Gabala	Lankaran
18:00 AZST (UTC+5)	Tsvetkov 25'	Summary	Aptsiauri 76'; Ostap 79' (pen.)	Stadium: Lankaran City Stadium; Attendance: 6,000; Referee: RovshanAhmadov

9 May 2009 25	Qarabağ	1–0	Khazar Lankaran	Baku^{2}
AZST (UTC+5)	Sakiri 86'	Summary		Stadium: Tofiq Bahramov Stadium

16 May 2009 26	Khazar Lankaran	3–1	Simurq	Lankaran
18:00 AZST (UTC+5)	Tsvetkov 23' (pen.); Rômulo 25', 65'	Summary	Maziar 85'	Stadium: Lankaran City Stadium; Attendance: 4,500; Referee: Anar Salmanov

==== Table ====
Pos	Team	Pld	W	D	L	GF	GA	GD	Pts	Qualification or relegation
2	Inter Baku	26	18	7	1	54	16	+38	61	Qualification for Europa League first qualifying round
3	Simurq	26	16	5	5	39	20	+19	53	Qualification for Europa League first qualifying round
4	Khazar Lankaran	26	15	5	6	49	21	+28	50	
5	Qarabağ	26	14	7	5	35	22	+13	49	Qualification for Europa League second qualifying round (Note: Karabakh won the 2008–09 Azerbaijan Cup and therefore qualified for the second qualifying round of the UEFA Europa League.)
6	Olimpik Baku	26	12	8	6	32	18	+14	44	

Source: Soccerway.com
Rules for classification: 1) points; 2) goal difference; 3) number of goals scored.

=== Azerbaijan Cup ===
30 October 2008 Round of 16 1st Leg	Khazar Lankaran	3–0	NBC Salyan^{1}	Lankaran
15:00 AZT (UTC+4)	Răducanu 20', 38'; Renato 60'	Summary		Stadium: Lankaran City Stadium

6 November 2008 Round of 16 2nd Leg	FK Mughan^{1}	0–3 (0–6 agg.)	Khazar Lankaran	Salyan
14:00 AZT (UTC+4)		Summary	Juninho 25'; Răducanu 45', 60'	Stadium: Salyan Olympic Sport Complex Stadium

25 February 2009 Quarterfinals 1st Leg	Khazar Lankaran	0–1	Baku	Lankaran
18:00 AZT (UTC+4)		Summary	Tijani 49'; Tomas (red card) 90'	Stadium: Lankaran City Stadium

11 March 2009 Quarterfinals 2nd Leg	Baku	2–2 (3–2 agg.)	Khazar Lankaran	Baku
14:00 AZT (UTC+4)	Adamia 68'; Yunisoğlu 90'	Summary	Cvetkov 28', 67'	Stadium: Tofik Bakhramov Stadium

=== UEFA Cup ===
==== Qualifying Phase ====
17 July 2008 1st qualifying round 1st leg	Khazar Lankaran (Azerbaijan)	0–1	(Poland) Lech Poznań	Baku, Azerbaijan
21:00 AZST (UTC+5)		Report; Summary	Lewandowski 75'	Stadium: Tofik Bakhramov Stadium; Referee: Calum Murray (Scotland)

31 July 2008 1st qualifying round 2nd leg	Lech Poznań (Poland)	4–1 (5–1 agg.)	(Azerbaijan) Khazar Lankaran	Poznań, Poland
23:45 AZST (UTC+5)	Štilić 35'; Murawski 52'; Injac 64'; Reiss 82'	Report; Summary	Ramazanov 45'; Bakhshiev (yellow card) 39' (yellow-red card) 61'	Stadium: Stadion Miejski; Referee: Meir Levi (Israel)

== Squad statistics ==
=== Appearances and goals ===
No.	Pos	Nat	Player	Total		Premier League		Azerbaijan Cup		UEFA Cup	
No.	Pos	Nat	Player	Apps	Goals	Apps	Goals	Apps	Goals	Apps	Goals
1	GK	(Azerbaijan) AZE	Dmitriy Kramarenko	22	0	20	0	0	0	2	0
2	DF	(Turkey) TUR	Göksel Akinci	12	0	12	0	0	0	0	0
3	DF	(Brazil) BRA	Denis Silva	17	3	15	3	0	0	2	0
4	DF	(Turkey) TUR	Fatih Sonkaya	8	0	8	0	0	0	0	0
5	DF	(Azerbaijan) AZE	Emin Quliyev	12	1	12	1	0	0	0	0
6	DF	(Azerbaijan) AZE	Fizuli Mammedov	2	0	2	0	0	0	0	0
7	DF	(Azerbaijan) AZE	Ruslan Poladov	9	0	9	0	0	0	0	0
9	FW	(Bulgaria) BUL	Ivan Tsvetkov	21	15	21	15	0	0	0	0
10	MF	(Azerbaijan) AZE	Jeyhun Sultanov	15	0	14	0	0	0	0+1	0
11	FW	(Brazil) BRA	Rômulo	22	8	22	8	0	0	0	0
12	GK	(Azerbaijan) AZE	Ramiz Kerimov	1	0	1	0	0	0	0	0
13	FW	(Sweden) SWE	Nadir Benchenaa	4	0	4	0	0	0	0	0
14	MF	(Azerbaijan) AZE	Rahid Amirguliev	26	4	24	4	0	0	2	0
18	MF	(Azerbaijan) AZE	Alim Gurbanov	6	0	4	0	0	0	0+2	0
19	DF	(Bulgaria) BUL	Kostadin Dzhambazov	23	3	23	3	0	0	0	0
20	FW	(Romania) ROU	Claudiu Răducanu	10	1	10	1	0	0	0	0
21	MF	(Bulgaria) BUL	Radomir Todorov	26	0	24	0	0	0	2	0
23	DF	(Lithuania) LTU	Audrius Veikutis	12	0	10	0	0	0	2	0
25	GK	(Azerbaijan) AZE	Kamran Agayev	7	0	7	0	0	0	0	0
27	MF	(Azerbaijan) AZE	Rashad Abdullayev	20	2	18	2	0	0	2	0
30	MF	(Brazil) BRA	Mario Sergio	20	5	20	5	0	0	0	0
33	MF	(Brazil) BRA	Diego Souza	22	0	20	0	0	0	2	0
34	DF	(Turkey) TUR	Muammer Erdoğdu	3	0	3	0	0	0	0	0
50	FW	(Ivory Coast) CIV	Yacouba Bamba	4	0	2	0	0	0	2	0
55	MF	(Brazil) BRA	Juninho	22	1	21	1	0	0	0+1	0
60	FW	(Turkey) TUR	Ahmet Dursun	10	5	10	5	0	0	0	0
72	MF	(Turkey) TUR	Devran Ayhan	20	1	20	1	0	0	0	0
77	FW	(Portugal) POR	Renato Queirós	3	0	3	0	0	0	0	0
Players who appeared for Khazar Lankaran who left during the season:
4	DF	(Azerbaijan) AZE	Mahir Shukurov	2	0	0+0	0	0	0	2	0
8	MF	(Azerbaijan) AZE	Elmar Bakhshiev	2	0	0+0	0	0	0	2	0
10	FW	(Azerbaijan) AZE	Zaur Ramazanov	2	1	0+0	0	0	0	2	1

=== Goal scorers ===
Place	Position	Nation	Number	Name	Premier League	Azerbaijan Cup	UEFA Cup	Total
1	FW	(Bulgaria)	9	Ivan Tsvetkov	15	2	0	17
2	FW	(Brazil)	11	Rômulo	8	0	0	8
3	MF	(Brazil)	30	Mario Sergio	5	0	0	5
3	FW	(Turkey)	60	Ahmet Dursun	5	0	0	5
3	FW	(Romania)	20	Claudiu Răducanu	1	4	0	5
6	MF	(Azerbaijan)	14	Rahid Amirguliev	4	0	0	4
7	DF	(Bulgaria)	19	Kostadin Dzhambazov	3	0	0	3
7	DF	(Brazil)	3	Denis Silva	3	0	0	3
8	MF	(Azerbaijan)	27	Rashad Abdullayev	2	0	0	2
8	MF	(Brazil)	55	Juninho	1	1	0	2
11	FW	(Portugal)	77	Renato Queirós	0	1	0	1
11	MF	(Azerbaijan)	5	Emin Quliyev	1	0	0	1
11	MF	(Turkey)	72	Devran Ayhan	1	0	0	1
11	FW	(Azerbaijan)	10	Zaur Ramazanov	0	0	1	1
				TOTALS	49	8	1	58

=== Disciplinary record ===
Number	Nation	Position	Name	Premier League		Azerbaijan Cup		UEFA Cup		Total	
Number	Nation	Position	Name	Yellow card	Red card	Yellow card	Red card	Yellow card	Red card	Yellow card	Red card
1	(Azerbaijan)	GK	Dmitriy Kramarenko	0	0	0	0	1	0	1	0
8	(Azerbaijan)	MF	Elmar Bakhshiev	0	0	0	0	2	1	2	1
14	(Azerbaijan)	MF	Rahid Amirguliev	0	0	0	0	1	0	1	0
37	(Azerbaijan)	MF	Rashad Abdullayev	0	0	0	0	1	0	1	0
			TOTALS	0	0	0	0	5	1	5	1

== Notes ==
- On 31 October 2008, FK NBC Salyan changed their name to FK Mughan.
- Qarabağ have played their home games at the Tofiq Bahramov Stadium since 1993 due to the ongoing situation in Quzanlı.
