= Turks in Azerbaijan =

Ethnic group in Azerbaijan

Total population
- 38,000 (2009 census) 19,000 Ottoman Turkish descendants (not including the Meskhetian Turks or Turkish citizens) 100,000 Meskhetian Turks (1999 United Nations High Commissioner for Refugees estimate) 90,000 to 110,000 Meskhetian Turks (other estimates) plus 17,577 Turkish citizens

Regions with significant populations
- Baku; Beylagan; Khachmaz; Saatli; Sabirabad

Languages
- Turkish; Azerbaijani

Religion
- Sunni Muslim (Hanafi); Shiite Muslim

Turks in Azerbaijan, or Turkish Azerbaijanis, (Turkish: Azerbaycan'daki Türkler) refers to ethnic Turkish people who live in the Republic of Azerbaijan. The community is largely made of Ottoman Turkish descendants who have lived in Azerbaijan for centuries, as well as the Turkish Meskhetian community which arrived in large numbers during Soviet rule. More recently, there has been Turkish migration from the Republic of Turkey, as well as from other post-Ottoman modern nation-states (e.g. from the Balkans, Cyprus and the Levant) and from the Turkish diaspora (e.g. Germany and the Netherlands).

== History ==
=== Ottoman migration ===
Ottoman Turks began to settle in Azerbaijan when the region came under the rule of the Ottoman Empire between 1578 and 1603 and then again in the second Ottoman conquest of 1724 until the end of World War I in 1918. The First All-Union Census of the Soviet Union in 1926 recorded 8,570 Ottoman Turks living in the Soviet Union. The Ottoman Turks are no longer listed separately in the census; it is presumed that those who were living in Azerbaijan have either been assimilated into Azerbaijani society or have left the country. Approximately 19,000 descendants of the Ottoman Turks (not including the Meskhetian Turks) are estimated to be living in Azerbaijan.

=== Meskhetian Turks migration ===
The Meskhetian Turks first arrived in Azerbaijan at the end of the nineteenth century, and more followed in 1918-1920. However, migration to Azerbaijan increased dramatically after World War II when the Soviet Union was preparing to launch a pressure campaign against Turkey. Vyacheslav Molotov, then Minister of Foreign Affairs, demanded to the surrender of three Anatolian provinces (Kars, Ardahan and Artvin); thus, war against Turkey seemed possible, and Joseph Stalin wanted to clear the strategic Turkish population situated in Meskheti, located near the Turkish-Georgian border which were likely to be hostile to Soviet intentions. Thus, in 1944, the Meskhetian Turks were forcefully deported from the Meskheti region in Georgia and accused of smuggling, banditry and espionage in collaboration with their kin across the Turkish border. Nationalistic policies at the time encouraged the slogan: "Georgia for Georgians" and that the Meskhetian Turks should be sent to Turkey "where they belong". Joseph Stalin deported the Meskhetian Turks to Central Asia (especially to Uzbekistan), thousands dying en route in cattle-trucks, and were not permitted by the Georgian government of Zviad Gamsakhurdia to return to their homeland.

Between the late 1950s and 1970s, about 25,000 to 30,000 Meskhetian Turks settled in Azerbaijan; furthermore, approximately 50,000 Meskhetian Turkish refugees came to Azerbaijan due to continued discrimination when the Meskhetian Turks living in Uzbekistan became the victims of riots by the ethnic Uzbeks in the Ferghana valley which led to over a hundred deaths. Most of the first wave of Meskhetian Turkish refugees from the Ferghana Valley settled in the Saatli and Sabirabad region and the regions of Khachmaz, Beylagan and Baku. Some 5,000 Meskhetian Turks have also arrived to Azerbaijan from Russia during the 1990s, and a few hundred arrived from Nagorno-Karabakh to Azerbaijan proper during the 1991-1994 war.

=== Mainland Turkish migration ===
Azerbaijan has witnessed increasing numbers of immigrants from Turkey. By 2009, 17,577 Turkish citizens were living in Azerbaijan.

=== Migration from the Turkish diaspora ===
In recent years, there has been migration to Azerbaijan from the Turkish diaspora communities. This has been particularly noticeable with the number of Turkish Germans which have acquired Azerbaijani citizenship to play from the Azerbaijani national football team (e.g. Ufuk Budak, Tuğrul Erat, Ali Gökdemir, Taşkın İlter, Cihan Özkara, Uğur Pamuk, Timur Temeltaş, and Fatih Şanlı).

== Demographics ==
Turks in Azerbaijan according to the Azerbaijani census
Azerbaijani census	Turks	%
1959	200	0%
1970	8,500	0.2%
1979	7,900	0.2%
1989	17,700	0.2%
1999	43,400	0.5%
2009	38,000	0.4%

The Meskhetian Turks are settled mostly in rural areas and in the cities of Baku, Beylagan, Khachmaz, Saatli, and Sabirabad. Those living in urban areas tend to be better off than those in agricultural areas.

=== Population ===
According to the 2009 Azerbaijani population census there were 38,000 Turks living in Azerbaijan. However, official data regarding the Turkish community in Azerbaijan is unlikely to provide a true indication of the population as much of the community is officially registered as "Azerbaijani". Furthermore, no distinction is made in the census between Meskhetian Turks and Turks from Turkey who have become Azerbaijani citizens, both groups are classified in the official census as "Turks" or "Azerbaijani".

Approximately 19,000 descendants of Ottoman Turkish migrants are still living in Azerbaijan and practice Sunni Islam. However, since the twentieth century a new wave of Turkish migrants arrived from Georgia (Meskhetia) and Turkey. In the late 1950s and 1970s approximately 25,000 to 30,000 Meskhetian Turks settled in Azerbaijan and a further 50,000 Meskhetian Turkish refugees arrived from Uzbekistan in 1989. According to the United Nations High Commissioner for Refugees 100,000 Meskhetian Turks were living in Azerbaijan in 1999 Academic estimates have suggested that the Meskhetian Turkish community of Azerbaijan numbers 90,000 to 110,000. In addition, as of 2009, there were 17,577 Turkish citizens living in Azerbaijan.

== Notable people ==
This list includes notable ethnic Turkish people with Azerbaijani citizenship. Many Turkish Azerbaijanis come from the Turkish Meskhetian community or from Turkey. In addition, there are notable individuals from the Turkish diaspora who have obtained Azeri citizenship, especially from the Turkish German and Turkish Dutch communities.

- Sima Ağayeva, artist (Turkish Meskhetian origin)
- Shafiga Afandizadeh, journalist (Turkish Meskhetian origin)
- Devran Ayhan, football player
- Isgender Aznaurov, National Hero of Azerbaijan who fought in the First Nagorno-Karabakh War (Turkish Meskhetian origin)
- Ufuk Budak, football player (Turkish German origin)
- Hülya Cin, football player (Turkish German origin)
- Mert Çelik, football player
- Adil Efendiyev, literary critic (Turkish Meskhetian origin)
- Baris Ekincier, football player (Turkish German origin)
- Tuğrul Erat, football player (Turkish German origin)
- Cabbar Faiqov, military doctor (Turkish Meskhetian origin)
- Cem Felek, football player (Turkish German origin)
- Aşıq Feydayi, ashik (Turkish Meskhetian origin)
- Ali Gökdemir, football player (Turkish German origin)
- Abdurrahman Gulahmadov, scientist (Turkish Meskhetian origin)
- Khalis Gulahmadov, scientist (Turkish Meskhetian origin)
- Asif Hacılı, literary critic (Turkish Meskhetian origin)
- Ozan Kökçü, football player (Turkish Dutch origin)
- Muslim Magomayev, opera and pop singer (maternal Turkish grandfather)
- Sergey Markelov, football player (Turkish father and Russian mother)
- Movlud Miraliyev, Olympic judoka (Turkish Meskhetian origin)
- Omar Faig Nemanzadeh, journalist (Turkish Meskhetian origin)
- Emin Nouri, football player (Turkish Bulgarian origin and naturalised Swedish and Azerbaijani citizen)
- Cihan Özkara, football player (Turkish German origin)
- Ahmad bey Pepinov, politician (Turkish Meskhetian origin)
- Mehmet Akif Pirim, Olympic sports wrestler
- Amel Senan, actress (Turkish Iraqi father)
- Şefika Şeyhzade-Efendizade, one of the first female journalists, educators, writers and philanthropists in Azerbaijan (Turkish Meskhetian origin)
- Ilter Tashkin, football player (Turkish German origin)
- Timur Temeltaş, football player (Turkish German origin)
- Deniz Yılmaz, football player (Turkish German origin)

== See also ==
- Azerbaijan–Turkey relations
- Azerbaijanis in Turkey
- Battle of Baku
- Turks in the former Soviet Union

== Bibliography ==
- Akiner, Shirin (1983), Islamic Peoples of the Soviet Union, Taylor & Francis, ISBN 0-7103-0025-5.
- Aydıngün, Ayşegül; Harding, Çigğdem Balım; Hoover, Matthew; Kuznetsov, Igor; Swerdlow, Steve (2006), Meskhetian Turks: An Introduction to their History, Culture, and Resettelment Experiences (PDF), Center for Applied Linguistics, archived from the original (PDF) on 2007-07-14
- Bennigsen, Alexandre; Broxup, Marie (1983), The Islamic threat to the Soviet state, Taylor & Francis, ISBN 0-7099-0619-6.
- Burford, Tim (2011), Georgia, Bradt Travel Guides, ISBN 978-1-84162-357-3.
- Coene, Frederik (2009), The Caucasus: An Introduction, Taylor & Francis, ISBN 978-0-415-48660-6.
- Cornell, Svante E. (2001), Small nations and great powers: a study of ethnopolitical conflict in the Caucasus, Routledge, ISBN 0-7007-1162-7.
- Kurbanov, Rafik Osman-Ogly; Kurbanov, Erjan Rafik-Ogly (1995), "Religion and Politics in the Caucasus", in Bourdeaux, Michael (ed.), The Politics of Religion in Russia and the New States of Eurasia, M.E. Sharpe, ISBN 1-56324-357-1.
- Pentikäinen, Oskari; Trier, Tom (2004), Between Integration and Resettlement: The Meskhetian Turks, European Centre For Minority Issues
- Ryazantsev, Sergey V. (2009), "Turkish Communities in the Russian Federation" (PDF), International Journal on Multicultural Societies, 11 (2): 155–173
- Tomlinson, Kathryn (2005), "Living Yesterday in Today and Tomorrow: Meskhetian Turks in Southern Russia", in Crossley, James G.; Karner, Christian (eds.), Writing History, Constructing Religion, Ashgate Publishing, ISBN 0-7546-5183-5.
- UNHCR (1999), Background Paper on Refugees and Asylum Seekers from Azerbaijan (PDF), United Nations High Commissioner for Refugees
- United Nations High Commissioner for Refugees (2003), International Protection Considerations Regarding Azerbaijani Asylum-Seekers and Refugees (PDF), United Nations High Commissioner for Refugees
