= 2014–15 Simurq PFC season =

Simurq
2014–15 season
- President: Anar Bakirov
- Manager: Giorgi Chikhradze until 16 July 2014
- Stadium: Zaqatala City Stadium
- Premier League: 5th
- Azerbaijan Cup: Semifinal vs Qarabağ
- Top goalscorer: League: Dragan Ćeran (14); All: Dragan Ćeran (18)
- Highest home attendance: 3,500 vs Neftchi Baku; 20 November 2014 vs Qarabağ; 17 April 2015
- Lowest home attendance: 300 vs Baku; 22 May 2015
- Average home league attendance: 1,858; 29 May 2015
Home colours	Away colours

The Simurq 2014–15 season is Simurq's ninth Azerbaijan Premier League season. They will compete in the 2014–15 Azerbaijan Premier League and the 2014–15 Azerbaijan Cup. Giorgi Chikhradze left his position as manager on 16 July 2014.

== Squad ==
As of 30 January 2015

Note: Flags indicate national team as defined under FIFA eligibility rules; some limited exceptions apply. Players may hold more than one non-FIFA nationality.

No.	Pos.	Nation	Player
1	GK	POL	Paweł Kapsa
2	DF	AZE	Ilkin Qirtimov
3	DF	POL	Adam Banaś
4	DF	ESP	Melli
5	FW	AZE	Vadim Abdullayev
6	MF	AZE	Samir Zargarov
7	MF	AZE	Elnur Abdullayev
8	MF	KEN	Patrick Osiako
9	MF	AZE	Mirzaga Huseynpur (on loan from Inter Baku)
10	FW	AZE	Rashad Eyyubov
11	FW	SRB	Dragan Ćeran
13	DF	AZE	Ali Gökdemir
14	FW	AZE	Vugar Mustafayev

No.	Pos.	Nation	Player
15	MF	CRO	Stjepan Poljak
16	DF	AZE	Maharram Huseynov
17	DF	AZE	Rustam Mammadov
18	DF	AZE	Tural Akhundov
20	MF	ISR	Idan Weitzman
22	FW	AZE	Cihan Özkara (on loan from Sivasspor)
25	FW	AZE	Oruj Balashli
26	MF	BEL	Benjamin Lambot
33	DF	AZE	Kanan Muslimov
35	GK	AZE	Amil Agajanov
76	MF	AZE	Vusal Isgandarli
88	MF	SRB	Marko Stanojević (on loan from Sheriff Tiraspol)
94	GK	AZE	Rashad Azizli (on loan from Neftchi Baku)

== Transfers ==
=== Summer ===
In: Note: Flags indicate national team as defined under FIFA eligibility rules; some limited exceptions apply. Players may hold more than one non-FIFA nationality.

No.	Pos.	Nation	Player
3	DF	POL	Adam Banaś (from (Poland) Zagłębie Lubin)
5	FW	AZE	Vadim Abdullayev (from (Azerbaijan) Baku)
6	MF	AZE	Samir Zargarov (from (Azerbaijan) Inter Baku)
9	FW	CZE	Lukáš Třešňák (from (Czech Republic) Baumit Jablonec)
13	DF	AZE	Ali Gökdemir (from (Germany) Hannover 96)
14	FW	AZE	Vugar Mustafayev (from (Azerbaijan) Baku)
76	MF	AZE	Vusal Isgandarli (from (Azerbaijan) Ravan Baku)
88	MF	SRB	Marko Stanojević (loan from (Moldova) Sheriff Tiraspol)

Out: Note: Flags indicate national team as defined under FIFA eligibility rules; some limited exceptions apply. Players may hold more than one non-FIFA nationality.

No.	Pos.	Nation	Player
3	DF	AZE	Nduka Usim
4	DF	BIH	Dilaver Zrnanović
5	DF	BRA	Anderson do Ó
6	MF	AZE	Tagim Novruzov (to (Azerbaijan) Sumgayit)
7	DF	AZE	Ruslan Poladov (to (Azerbaijan) Sumgayit)
9	MF	LTU	Mindaugas Kalonas (loan return to (Azerbaijan) Baku)
22	FW	MLI	Salif Ballo (to (Algeria) MO Béjaïa)
30	MF	ROU	Raul Costin (to (Romania) Universitatea Cluj)
77	FW	AZE	Nijat Gurbanov (loan return to (Azerbaijan) Neftchi Baku)

=== Winter ===
In: Note: Flags indicate national team as defined under FIFA eligibility rules; some limited exceptions apply. Players may hold more than one non-FIFA nationality.

No.	Pos.	Nation	Player
4	DF	ESP	Melli (from (Greece) Ergotelis)
7	MF	AZE	Elnur Abdullayev (from (Azerbaijan) Khazar Lankaran)
9	MF	AZE	Mirzaga Huseynpur (loan from (Azerbaijan) Inter Baku)
22	FW	AZE	Cihan Özkara (loan from (Turkey) Sivasspor)

Out: Note: Flags indicate national team as defined under FIFA eligibility rules; some limited exceptions apply. Players may hold more than one non-FIFA nationality.

No.	Pos.	Nation	Player
9	FW	CZE	Lukáš Třešňák
21	MF	AZE	Murad Sattarli

== Friendlies ==
6 July 2014	Simurq (Azerbaijan)	0 – 1	(Slovenia) Aluminij
AZST (UTC+5)		[ Report]

9 July 2014	Simurq (Azerbaijan)	2 – 2	(North Macedonia) Vardar
AZST (UTC+5)		[ Report]

20 July 2014	Simurq (Azerbaijan)	0 – 2	(Israel) Maccabi Haifa	Austria
AZST (UTC+5)		[ Report]

26 July 2014	Simurq (Azerbaijan)	1 – 4	(Russia) Amkar Perm	Austria
AZST (UTC+5)	Goal	Report	36'; Phibel 38'; Peev 45+1' (pen.); Picușceac 82'

30 July 2014	Simurq (Azerbaijan)	Cancelled	(England) Fulham	Jenbach, Austria
AZST (UTC+5)		Report		Stadium: Jenbach Stadium

1 August 2014	Simurq (Azerbaijan)	2 – 3	(Qatar) Al Sadd	Austria
21:00 AZST (UTC+5)		[ Report]

13 January 2015	Shakhter Karagandy (Kazakhstan)	1 – 3	(Azerbaijan) Simurq	Antalya, Turkey
AZT (UTC+4)	Finonchenko 87'	Report	E.Abdullayev 25'; Stanojević 27'; Ćeran 37'

15 January 2014	MSV Duisburg (Germany)	4 – 1	(Azerbaijan) Simurq	Antalya, Turkey
AZT (UTC+4)	Gardawski 29' de Wit 62' (pen.); Klotz 64'; Dapkus 86'	Report	S.Zargarov 23'

18 January 2014	Irtysh Pavlodar (Kazakhstan)	3 – 0	(Azerbaijan) Simurq	Antalya, Turkey
AZT (UTC+4)	Goal	Report

21 January 2014	Astra Giurgiu (Romania)	0 – 0	(Azerbaijan) Simurq	Antalya, Turkey
AZT (UTC+4)		Report

24 January 2014	Volyn Lutsk (Ukraine)	0 – 2	(Azerbaijan) Simurq	Antalya, Turkey
AZT (UTC+4)		[ Report]	Eyyubov; N.Mukhtarova

== Competitions ==
=== Azerbaijan Premier League ===
==== Results summary ====
Overall								Home						Away					
Pld	W	D	L	GF	GA	GD	Pts	W	D	L	GF	GA	GD	W	D	L	GF	GA	GD
32	11	6	15	39	39	0	39	9	2	5	27	17	+10	2	4	10	12	22	−10

Last updated: 28 May 2015.
Source: Soccerway

==== Results ====
9 August 2014 1	Baku	Postponed	Simurq	Baku
18:00 AZST (UTC+5)		Summary		Stadium: Tofiq Bahramov Stadium; Referee: Orkhan Mämmädov

17 August 2014 2	Simurq	2 – 0	AZAL	Zaqatala
19:00 AZST (UTC+5)	Eyyubov 4'; T.Narimanov 15' (o.g.); Ćeran (yellow card) 66'	Summary		Stadium: Zaqatala City Stadium; Attendance: 2,000; Referee: Aliyar Ağayev

24 August 2014 3	Simurq	2 – 0	Khazar Lankaran	Zaqatala
19:00 AZST (UTC+5)	Lambot (yellow card) 5'; S.Zargarov (yellow card) 33'; Ćeran 44' (red card) 90+2'; Eyyubov 61' (yellow card) 78'	Summary	Thiego (yellow card) 58'	Stadium: Zaqatala City Stadium; Attendance: 2,000; Referee: Elvin Äsgärov

31 August 2014 4	Neftchi Baku	2 – 1	Simurq	Baku
18:00 AZST (UTC+5)	Abdullayev 2'; E.Mehdiyev (yellow card) 19'; Wobay 47'; Ramos (yellow card) 75'; Stamenković (yellow card) 90+4'	Summary	Cardoso 54' (o.g.); Qirtimov (yellow card) 63'; Třešňák (yellow card) 89'	Stadium: Bakcell Arena; Attendance: 1,150; Referee: Orkhan Mämmädov

13 September 2014 5	Simurq	1 – 2	Gabala	Zaqatala
19:00 AZST (UTC+5)	Eyyubov 7' (pen.) (yellow card) 44'; V.Abdullayev (yellow card) 8'; Osiako (yellow card) 13'; Banaś (yellow card) 54'; T.Akhundov (yellow card) 54'	Summary	Benga (yellow card) 5' (yellow-red card) 86'; Ropotan (yellow card) 65'; Dodô 68', 80'; Huseynov (yellow card) 90+1'; E.Jamalov (yellow card) 90+4'	Stadium: Zaqatala City Stadium; Attendance: 2,500; Referee: Omar Paşayev

21 September 2014 6	Qarabağ	1 – 0	Simurq	Baku
20:00 AZST (UTC+5)	Nadirov 64'	Summary	Lambot (yellow card) 71'; V.Abdullayev (yellow card) 89'	Stadium: Tofiq Bahramov Stadium^{1} Attendance: 200; Referee: Aliyar Ağayev

28 September 2014 7	Simurq	3 – 2	Sumgayit	Zaqatala
18:00 AZST (UTC+5)	Eyyubov (yellow card) 22'; Agajanov (yellow card) 35'; S.Zargarov (yellow card) 43'; Banaś 61'; Qirtimov 74'; Stanojević 76'	Summary	Kurbanov 36' (pen.); Abbasov (yellow card) 45'; O.Aliyev (yellow card) 47' (goal) 58'	Stadium: Zaqatala City Stadium; Attendance: 2,000; Referee: Ramil Diniyev

2 October 2014 1	Baku	1 – 0	Simurq	Baku
16:00 AZST (UTC+5)	N.Novruzov 34' (yellow card) 76'; Pelagias (yellow card) 38'; V.Baybalayev (yellow card) 51'; Travner (yellow card) 88'	Summary	Qirtimov (yellow card) 15'; Weitzman (yellow card) 87'	Stadium: Tofiq Bahramov Stadium; Attendance: 200; Referee: Fariz Yusifov

18 October 2014 8	Inter Baku	0 – 0	Simurq	Baku
18:00 AZST (UTC+5)	Hajiyev (yellow card) 90+3'	Summary	Poljak (yellow card) 78'; Lambot (yellow card) 90+3'	Stadium: Inter Arena; Attendance: 600; Referee: Ingilab Mämmädov

25 October 2014 9	Simurq	Annulled^{2}	Araz-Naxçıvan	Zaqatala
18:00 AZST (UTC+5)	Ćeran (yellow card) 8'; Stanojević 34'; Eyyubov 47', 56', 90+3'; Lambot (yellow card) 59'	Summary	T.Hümbätov (yellow card) 4'; K.Hüseynov (yellow card) 44'	Stadium: Zaqatala City Stadium; Attendance: 1,500; Referee: Aliyar Ağayev

29 October 2014 10	AZAL	2 – 2	Simurq	Baku
17:00 AZT (UTC+4)	Kļava (yellow card) 48'; Abdullayev 56' (pen.); S.Rahimov (yellow card) 73'; Eduardo 79'	Summary	S.Zargarov 15'; R.Mammadov (yellow card) 56'; T.Akhundov (yellow card) 76'; Gökdemir 90+1'	Stadium: AZAL Arena; Attendance: 250; Referee: Fariz Yusifov

2 November 2014 11	Khazar Lankaran	2 – 1	Simurq	Lankaran
17:00 AZT (UTC+4)	Ivanov (yellow card) 12' (goal) 40'; Lambot 60' (o.g.); Scarlatache (yellow card) 87'; Ramaldanov (yellow card) 90+4'	Summary	T.Akhundov (yellow card) 9'; Eyyubov (yellow card) 31'; V.Abdullayev (yellow card) 34'; Weitzman 38' (yellow card) 89'; Gökdemir (yellow card) 79'	Stadium: Lankaran City Stadium; Attendance: 5,000; Referee: Omar Paşayev

20 November 2014 12	Simurq	1 – 0	Neftchi Baku	Zaqatala
15:00 AZT (UTC+4)	Stanojević (yellow card) 14'; Ćeran 18' (pen.); Qirtimov (yellow card) 63'; Kapsa (yellow card) 90+3'	Summary	E.Balayev (yellow card) 18'; Cardoso (yellow card) 19'; M.Isayev (yellow card) 29'	Stadium: Zaqatala City Stadium; Attendance: 3,500; Referee: Fariz Yusifov

23 November 2014 13	Gabala	2 – 3	Simurq	Qabala
17:15 AZT (UTC+4)	R.Tagizade (yellow card) 22'; Ehiosun 40'; Ropotan (yellow card) 53'; B.Soltanov 90+2'	Summary	Stanojević 7'; Ćeran (yellow card) 57' (goal) 79', 83'; Qirtimov (yellow card) 65'	Stadium: Gabala City Stadium; Attendance: 1,000; Referee: Vusal Äliyev

30 November 2014 14	Simurq	2 – 3	Qarabağ	Zaqatala
17:00 AZT (UTC+4)	Ćeran 14'; T.Akhundov (yellow card) 64'; S.Zargarov (yellow card) 69'; Stanojević 80'	Summary	Gurbanov 23'; George 55', 74'	Stadium: Zaqatala City Stadium; Attendance: 3,000; Referee: Rahim Häsänov

7 December 2014 15	Sumgayit	2 – 1	Simurq	Sumqayit
16:00 AZT (UTC+4)	T.Mikayilov 38'; Kurbanov 80'; Mammadov (yellow card) 90+1'	Summary	Eyyubov 5'; Osiako (yellow card) 13'; Qirtimov (yellow card) 21'; Gökdemir (yellow card) 64'	Stadium: Kapital Bank Arena; Attendance: 1,000; Referee: Ingilab Mämmädov

13 December 2014 16	Simurq	1 – 1	Inter Baku	Zaqatala
17:00 AZT (UTC+4)	Ćeran 43'; Stanojević (yellow card) 71'	Summary	Tskhadadze (yellow card) 26'; Nildo 90+2'	Stadium: Zaqatala City Stadium; Attendance: 1,500; Referee: Orkhan Mämmädov

17 December 2014 17	Araz-Naxçıvan	– ^{2}	Simurq	Nakhchivan
AZT (UTC+4)		[ Summary]		Stadium: Nakhchivan City Stadium

22 December 2014 18	Simurq	5 – 2	Baku	Zaqatala
12:00 AZT (UTC+4)	Eyyubov 16', 42' (yellow card) 38'; Ćeran 33' (pen.); Poljak (yellow card) 45'; Weitzman 45+1'; S.Zargarov 47'	Summary	N.Novruzov 14', 70' (pen.); G.Aliyev (yellow card) 17'; E.Huseynov (yellow card) 32'; A.Guliyev (yellow card) 45'	Stadium: Zaqatala City Stadium; Attendance: 700; Referee: Omar Paşayev

1 February 2015 19	Simurq	2 – 0	Khazar Lankaran	Zaqatala
17:00 AZT (UTC+4)	E.Abdullayev 51'; Eyyubov 60'; Stanojević (yellow card) 69'; Qirtimov (yellow card) 78'	Summary	I.Safarzade (yellow card) 11'; Sankoh (yellow card) 45+'; A.Ramazanov (yellow card) 53'	Stadium: Zaqatala City Stadium; Attendance: 1,000; Referee: Ramil Diniyev

6 February 2015 20	Neftchi Baku	0 – 0	Simurq	Baku
16:00 AZT (UTC+4)	Yunuszade (yellow card) 51'; Cardoso (yellow card) 71'; Ramos (yellow card) 80'; Denis (yellow card) 90+2'	Summary	Eyyubov (yellow card) 84'	Stadium: Bakcell Arena; Attendance: 1,000; Referee: Aliyar Ağayev

10 February 2015 21	Simurq	2 – 0	Gabala	Zaqatala
17:00 AZT (UTC+4)	Weitzman (yellow card) 14'; Ćeran 25', 45+3'; T.Akhundov (yellow card) 42'; Qirtimov (yellow card) 65'; Mustafayev (yellow card) 84'	Summary	Mendy (yellow card) 14'; Bezotosnyi (red card) 45+1'; Santos (yellow card) 55'	Stadium: Zaqatala City Stadium; Attendance: 2,000; Referee: Ingilab Mämmädov

15 February 2015 22	Qarabağ	1 – 0	Simurq	Baku
18:00 AZT (UTC+4)	Muarem (yellow card) 20'; Reynaldo 21'	Summary	Stanojević (yellow card) 63'; Lambot (yellow card) 71'	Stadium: Tofiq Bahramov Stadium^{1} Attendance: 800; Referee: Ramil Diniyev

19 February 2015 23	Simurq	1 – 1	Sumgayit	Zaqatala
17:00 AZT (UTC+4)	Ćeran 45+1'; Melli (yellow card) 46'	Summary	B.Hasanalizade (yellow card) 31'; Kurbanov 38'; T.Mikayilov (yellow card) 90+2'	Stadium: Zaqatala City Stadium; Attendance: 800; Referee: Orkhan Mämmädov

28 February 2015 24	Inter Baku	2 – 1	Simurq	Baku
15:00 AZT (UTC+4)	Tskhadadze 18'; Mammadov 79'; Salukvadze (yellow card) 86'; D.Meza (yellow card) 88'; F.Bayramov (yellow card) 88'	Summary	Lambot (yellow card) 37'; Mustafayev (yellow card) 56'; Stanojević 87' (yellow card) 74' (yellow-red card) 88'	Stadium: Inter Arena; Attendance: 700; Referee: Aliyar Ağayev

7 March 2015 25	Simurq	– ^{2}	Araz-Naxçıvan	Zaqatala
AZT (UTC+4)		[ Summary]		Stadium: Zaqatala City Stadium

18 March 2015 26	Baku	0 – 3	Simurq	Baku
15:00 AZT (UTC+4)	E.Huseynov (yellow card) 15'; G.Aliyev (yellow card) 30'; Abbasov (yellow card) 35'; E.Ahmadov (yellow card) 38'; V.Baybalayev (yellow card) 56'; N.Novruzov (yellow card) 81'	Summary	S.Zargarov 3', 74'; Ćeran 40'; Özkara (yellow card) 49'; E.Abdullayev (yellow card) 77'	Stadium: Tofiq Bahramov Stadium; Attendance: 200; Referee: Omar Paşayev

1 April 2015 27	Simurq	1 – 0	AZAL	Zaqatala
15:00 AZST (UTC+5)	Ćeran 37' (pen.) (yellow card) 47'; T.Akhundov (yellow card) 41'; S.Zargarov (yellow card) 43'	Summary	O.Lalayev (yellow card) 16'; A.Shemonayev (yellow card) 37'; Mombongo-Dues (yellow card) 41'	Stadium: Zaqatala City Stadium; Attendance: 1,500; Referee: Orkhan Mämmädov

5 April 2015 28	Simurq	0 – 1	Neftchi Baku	Zaqatala
17:00 AZST (UTC+5)	Mustafayev (yellow card) 64'; A.Agajanov (yellow card) 73'	Summary	Ramos (yellow card) 21'; Seyidov (yellow card) 52'; Cardoso (yellow card) 65' (red card) 74'; A.Guliyev (yellow card) 72'; Canales 76' (yellow card) 77'; Mammadov (yellow card) 90+4'	Stadium: Zaqatala City Stadium; Attendance: 2,500; Referee: Ingilab Mämmädov

9 April 2015 29	Gabala	1 – 0	Simurq	Qabala
19:00 AZST (UTC+5)	Abışov 60'; Ehiosun (yellow card) 62'; Fomin (yellow card) 70'; B.Soltanov (yellow card) 71'; Huseynov (yellow card) 86'	Summary	Mustafayev (yellow card) 34'; S.Zargarov (yellow card) 79'	Stadium: Gabala City Stadium; Attendance: 3,000; Referee: Elvin Äsgärov

17 April 2015 30	Simurq	0 – 2	Qarabağ	Zaqatala
18:00 AZST (UTC+5)	Qirtimov (yellow card) 55'; S.Zargarov (yellow card) 63'; T.Akhundov (yellow card) 90+1'	Summary	Muarem 19', 81'; Agolli (yellow card) 51'; Richard (yellow card) 58'; Medvedev (yellow card) 60'	Stadium: Zaqatala City Stadium; Attendance: 3,500; Referee: Rahim Häsänov

25 April 2015 31	Sumgayit	1 – 0	Simurq	Sumqayit
17:00 AZST (UTC+5)	Fardjad-Azad 49' (yellow card) 77'; S.Mahammadaliyev (yellow card) 89'	Summary	E.Abdullayev (yellow card) 31'; T.Akhundov (yellow card) 90+3'; Eyyubov (yellow card) 90+4'	Stadium: Kapital Bank Arena; Attendance: 1,100; Referee: Omar Paşayev

1 May 2015 32	Simurq	2 – 3	Inter Baku	Zaqatala
17:00 AZST (UTC+5)	S.Zargarov 8'; V.Abdullayev 22'; Gökdemir (yellow card) 45+1'; Qirtimov (yellow card) 90+3'	Summary	Dashdemirov 2'; Álvaro 37'; D.Meza (yellow card) 41'; C.Meza 43' (yellow card) 56'	Stadium: Zaqatala City Stadium; Attendance: 1,000; Referee: Fariz Yusifov

8 May 2015 33	Araz-Naxçıvan	– ^{2}	Simurq	Nakhchivan
AZST (UTC+5)		[ Summary]		Stadium: Nakhchivan City Stadium

15 May 2015 34	Simurq	4 – 0	Baku	Zaqatala
17:00 AZST (UTC+5)	Melli (yellow card) 12'; Ćeran 28', 80'; Qirtimov (yellow card) 30'; Weitzman 37' (yellow card) 37'; Eyyubov 84'	Summary		Stadium: Zaqatala City Stadium; Attendance: 300; Referee: Vusal Äliyev

22 May 2015 35	AZAL	5 – 0	Simurq	Baku
19:00 AZST (UTC+5)	Mombongo-Dues 17', 39', 43', 80'; Abdullayev 54'	Summary	T.Akhundov (yellow card) 18'; A.Agajanov (red card) 21'	Stadium: AZAL Arena; Attendance: 200; Referee: Fariz Yusifov

28 May 2015 36	Khazar Lankaran	0 – 0	Simurq	Lankaran
21:00 AZST (UTC+5)		Summary	R.İsmayilov (yellow card) 30'	Stadium: Lankaran City Stadium; Attendance: 1,000; Referee: Omar Paşayev

==== League table ====
Pos	Team	Pld	W	D	L	GF	GA	GD	Pts	Qualification
1	Qarabağ (C)	32	20	8	4	51	28	+23	68	Qualification for Champions League second qualifying round
2	Inter Baku	32	17	12	3	55	20	+35	63	Qualification for Europa League first qualifying round
3	Gabala	32	15	9	8	46	35	+11	54	Qualification for Europa League first qualifying round
4	Neftchi Baku	32	13	10	9	38	33	+5	49	Qualification for Europa League first qualifying round
5	Simurq	32	11	6	15	41	39	+2	39	
6	AZAL	32	10	9	13	37	42	−5	39	
7	Khazar Lankaran	32	8	8	16	35	46	−11	32	
8	Sumgayit	32	7	10	15	32	43	−11	31	
9	Baku	32	3	8	21	19	68	−49	17	Relegation to the Azerbaijan First Division
10	Araz-Naxçıvan (Note: Araz-Naxçıvan were officially withdrawn from the league on 17 November 2014)	0	0	0	0	0	0	0	0	Team withdrawn

Source: uefa.com
Rules for classification: 1) points; 2) head-to-head points; 3) head-to-head goal difference; 4) head-to-head goals scored; 5. head-to-head away goals (only if 2 teams are tied); 6) goal difference; 7) goals scored.
(C) Champions

=== Azerbaijan Cup ===
3 December 2014 Second Round	Simurq	6 – 0	Ravan Baku	Zaqatala
17:00 AZT (UTC+4)	Ćeran 9', 57'; S.Zargarov (yellow card) 24'; Stanojević 59'; Gökdemir 60'; Eyyubov (yellow card) 67' (goal) 75'; Poljak 82'; Weitzman (yellow card) 84'	Summary	O.Hasanov (yellow card) 29' (yellow-red card) 55'	Stadium: Zaqatala City Stadium; Attendance: 500; Referee: Elvin Äsgärov

4 March 2015 Quarterfinals 1st leg	Gabala	0 – 3	Simurq	Qabala
19:00 AZT (UTC+4)	U.Abbasov (yellow card) 41'; Dodô (yellow card) 61'	Summary	Ćeran 17', 55'; S.Zargarov (yellow card) 20'; Melli (yellow card) 30'; Lambot 57'; T.Akhundov (yellow card) 81'	Stadium: Gabala City Stadium; Attendance: 400; Referee: Aliyar Ağayev

13 March 2015 Quarterfinals 2nd leg	Simurq	0 – 0 (3 – 0 agg.)	Gabala	Zaqatala
17:00 AZT (UTC+4)	Mustafayev (yellow card) 4'; Qirtimov (yellow card) 59'	Summary	B.Soltanov (yellow card) 32'; Mendy (yellow card) 57'; Huseynov (yellow card) 75'; Santos (yellow card) 84'	Stadium: Zaqatala City Stadium; Attendance: 2,000; Referee: Ramil Diniyev

13 April 2015 Semifinal 1st leg	Qarabağ	1 – 0	Simurq	Baku
18:00 AZST (UTC+5)	J.Taghiyev 15'; Medvedev (yellow card) 27'	Summary	Qirtimov (yellow card) 66'	Stadium: Tofiq Bahramov Stadium^{1} Attendance: 1,400; Referee: Aliyar Ağayev

21 April 2015 Semifinal 2nd leg	Simurq	0 – 0 (0 – 1 agg.)	Qarabağ	Zaqatala
18:00 AZST (UTC+5)	E.Abdullayev (yellow card) 85'; Kapsa (yellow card) 90+3'	Summary	George (yellow card) 40'	Stadium: Zaqatala City Stadium; Attendance: 3,000; Referee: Orkhan Mämmädov

== Squad statistics ==
As of Match played 28 May 2015

=== Appearances and goals ===
No.	Pos	Nat	Player	Total		Premier League		Azerbaijan Cup	
No.	Pos	Nat	Player	Apps	Goals	Apps	Goals	Apps	Goals
1	GK	(Poland) POL	Paweł Kapsa	29	0	25	0	4	0
2	DF	(Azerbaijan) AZE	Ilkin Qirtimov	33	1	29	1	4	0
3	DF	(Poland) POL	Adam Banaś	14	1	11+2	1	1	0
4	DF	(Spain) ESP	Melli	18	0	14	0	4	0
5	FW	(Azerbaijan) AZE	Vadim Abdullayev	20	1	16+3	1	1	0
6	MF	(Azerbaijan) AZE	Samir Zargarov	32	5	25+3	5	4	0
7	MF	(Azerbaijan) AZE	Elnur Abdullayev	15	1	7+6	1	1+1	0
8	MF	(Kenya) KEN	Patrick Osiako	15	0	10+4	0	0+1	0
9	MF	(Azerbaijan) AZE	Mirzaga Huseynpur	6	0	3+3	0	0	0
10	FW	(Azerbaijan) AZE	Rashad Eyyubov	33	9	27+1	8	4+1	1
11	FW	(Serbia) SRB	Dragan Ćeran	30	18	24+1	14	5	4
13	DF	(Azerbaijan) AZE	Ali Gökdemir	22	2	7+12	1	2+1	1
14	FW	(Azerbaijan) AZE	Vugar Mustafayev	16	0	11+1	0	4	0
15	MF	(Croatia) CRO	Stjepan Poljak	27	1	14+9	0	1+3	1
16	DF	(Azerbaijan) AZE	Maharram Huseynov	4	0	1+2	0	1	0
17	DF	(Azerbaijan) AZE	Rustam Mammadov	4	0	4	0	0	0
18	DF	(Azerbaijan) AZE	Tural Akhundov	24	0	20	0	4	0
20	MF	(Israel) ISR	Idan Weitzman	30	3	25	3	5	0
22	FW	(Azerbaijan) AZE	Cihan Özkara	15	0	4+8	0	0+3	0
25	FW	(Azerbaijan) AZE	Oruj Balashli	11	0	1+9	0	0+1	0
26	MF	(Belgium) BEL	Benjamin Lambot	30	1	25	0	4+1	1
32	GK	(Azerbaijan) AZE	Ülvi Quliyev	2	0	1+1	0	0	0
33	DF	(Azerbaijan) AZE	Kanan Muslimov	5	0	2+3	0	0	0
35	GK	(Azerbaijan) AZE	Amil Agajanov	7	0	6	0	1	0
42	DF	(Azerbaijan) AZE	Araz Äsädullazadä	1	0	0+1	0	0	0
67	FW	(Azerbaijan) AZE	Särxan Abdullayev	1	0	0+1	0	0	0
70	MF	(Azerbaijan) AZE	Cavad Kazımov	3	0	1+2	0	0	0
76	MF	(Azerbaijan) AZE	Vusal Isgandarli	1	0	1	0	0	0
78	MF	(Azerbaijan) AZE	İlqar Hüseynov	2	0	1+1	0	0	0
80	MF	(Azerbaijan) AZE	Roini İsmayilov	1	0	1	0	0	0
81	MF	(Azerbaijan) AZE	Nicat Muxtarov	5	0	2+3	0	0	0
83	DF	(Azerbaijan) AZE	Elmir Sulxayev	1	0	0+1	0	0	0
88	MF	(Serbia) SRB	Marko Stanojević	31	6	23+3	5	5	1
Players who away from the club on loan:
Players who appeared for Simurq no longer at the club:
9	FW	(Czech Republic) CZE	Lukáš Třešňák	8	0	1+7	0	0	0
21	MF	(Azerbaijan) AZE	Murad Sattarli	4	0	0+4	0	0	0

=== Goal scorers ===
Place	Position	Nation	Number	Name	Premier League	Azerbaijan Cup	Total
1	FW	(Serbia)	11	Dragan Ćeran	14	4	18
2	FW	(Azerbaijan)	10	Rashad Eyyubov	8	1	9
3	MF	(Serbia)	88	Marko Stanojević	5	1	6
4	MF	(Azerbaijan)	6	Samir Zargarov	5	0	5
5	MF	(Israel)	20	Idan Weitzman	3	0	3
6	DF	(Azerbaijan)	13	Ali Gökdemir	1	1	2
6				Own goal	2	0	2
8	DF	(Poland)	3	Adam Banaś	1	0	1
8	DF	(Azerbaijan)	2	Ilkin Qirtimov	1	0	1
8	MF	(Azerbaijan)	7	Elnur Abdullayev	1	0	1
8	FW	(Azerbaijan)	5	Vadim Abdullayev	1	0	1
8	MF	(Croatia)	15	Stjepan Poljak	0	1	1
8	MF	(Belgium)	26	Benjamin Lambot	0	1	1
				TOTALS	40	9	49

=== Disciplinary record ===
Number	Nation	Position	Name	Premier League		Azerbaijan Cup		Total	
Number	Nation	Position	Name	Yellow card	Red card	Yellow card	Red card	Yellow card	Red card
1	(Poland)	GK	Paweł Kapsa	1	0	1	0	2	0
2	(Azerbaijan)	DF	Ilkin Qirtimov	10	0	2	0	12	0
3	(Poland)	DF	Adam Banaś	1	0	0	0	1	0
4	(Spain)	DF	Melli	2	0	1	0	3	0
5	(Azerbaijan)	FW	Vadim Abdullayev	3	0	0	0	3	0
6	(Azerbaijan)	MF	Samir Zargarov	6	0	2	0	8	0
7	(Azerbaijan)	MF	Elnur Abdullayev	2	0	1	0	3	0
8	(Kenya)	MF	Patrick Osiako	2	0	0	0	2	0
9	(Czech Republic)	FW	Lukáš Třešňák	1	0	0	0	1	0
10	(Azerbaijan)	FW	Rashad Eyyubov	7	0	1	0	8	0
11	(Serbia)	FW	Dragan Ćeran	3	1	0	0	3	1
13	(Azerbaijan)	DF	Ali Gökdemir	3	0	0	0	3	0
14	(Azerbaijan)	FW	Vugar Mustafayev	4	0	1	0	5	0
15	(Croatia)	MF	Stjepan Poljak	2	0	0	0	2	0
17	(Azerbaijan)	DF	Rustam Mammadov	1	0	0	0	1	0
18	(Azerbaijan)	DF	Tural Akhundov	9	0	1	0	10	0
20	(Israel)	MF	Idan Weitzman	4	0	1	0	5	0
22	(Azerbaijan)	FW	Cihan Özkara	1	0	0	0	1	0
26	(Belgium)	MF	Benjamin Lambot	5	0	0	0	5	0
35	(Azerbaijan)	GK	Amil Agajanov	2	1	0	0	2	1
80	(Azerbaijan)	MF	Roini İsmayilov	1	0	0	0	1	0
88	(Serbia)	MF	Marko Stanojević	6	1	0	0	6	1
			TOTALS	76	3	11	0	87	3

== Notes ==
- Qarabağ have played their home games at the Tofiq Bahramov Stadium since 1993 due to the ongoing situation in Quzanlı.
- Araz-Naxçıvan were excluded from the Azerbaijan Premier League on 17 November 2014, with all their results being annulled.
