= List of Azerbaijan football transfers winter 2014–15 =

This is a list of Azerbaijan football transfers in the summer transfer window 2014 by club. Only clubs of the 2014–15 Azerbaijan Premier League are included.

== Azerbaijan Premier League 2014-15 ==
=== Araz-Naxçıvan ===
In: Note: Flags indicate national team as defined under FIFA eligibility rules; some limited exceptions apply. Players may hold more than one non-FIFA nationality.

No.	Pos.	Nation	Player

Out: Note: Flags indicate national team as defined under FIFA eligibility rules; some limited exceptions apply. Players may hold more than one non-FIFA nationality.

No.	Pos.	Nation	Player
1	GK	AZE	Elchin Sadigov (to (Azerbaijan) Neftchi Baku)
2	DF	AZE	Tural Hümbätov (to (Azerbaijan) Inter Baku)
3	MF	AZE	Alimirza Dashzarini
4	DF	AZE	Emin Jafarguliyev
5	MF	AZE	Javid Hasanov
6	MF	AZE	Budaq Nəsirov
7	MF	AZE	Ramal Huseynov
8	MF	AZE	Elmin Chobanov
9	MF	AZE	Garib Ibrahimov
10	MF	AZE	Eshgin Guliyev
11	MF	UKR	Sergei Silyuk
13	DF	AZE	Agil Nabiyev (to (Azerbaijan) AZAL)
14	DF	AZE	Elhad Naziri
15	FW	AZE	Ruslan Nasirli (to (Azerbaijan) AZAL)
16	MF	AZE	Kamil Hüseynov
17	FW	AZE	Bakhtiyar Soltanov (to (Azerbaijan) Gabala)
18	MF	AZE	Elgiz Kärämli
19	MF	AZE	Tarlan Khalilov
20	DF	UKR	Ruslan Zubkov
21	MF	GEO	David Janalidze
24	MF	AZE	Azer Mammadov (to (Azerbaijan) AZAL)
25	DF	UKR	Aleksandr Krutskevich
44	DF	AZE	Saşa Yunisoğlu
85	GK	AZE	Kamal Bayramov
91	MF	AZE	Kamil Nurähmädov
—	MF	AZE	Akif Taghiyev
—	MF	AZE	Əziz Hüseynov
—	MF	UKR	Ruslan Zeynalov

=== AZAL ===
In: Note: Flags indicate national team as defined under FIFA eligibility rules; some limited exceptions apply. Players may hold more than one non-FIFA nationality.

No.	Pos.	Nation	Player
10	MF	AZE	Nijat Gurbanov (loan from (Azerbaijan) Neftchi Baku)
23	DF	AZE	Aleksandr Shemonayev (from (Azerbaijan) Khazar Lankaran)
25	MF	UKR	Valeriy Kutsenko (from (Latvia) Daugava Daugavpils)
—	DF	AZE	Agil Nabiyev (from (Azerbaijan) Araz-Naxçıvan)
—	MF	AZE	Azer Mammadov (from (Azerbaijan) Araz-Naxçıvan)
—	FW	AZE	Ruslan Nasirli (from (Azerbaijan) Araz-Naxçıvan)

Out: Note: Flags indicate national team as defined under FIFA eligibility rules; some limited exceptions apply. Players may hold more than one non-FIFA nationality.

No.	Pos.	Nation	Player
7	MF	AZE	Tamkin Khalilzade (loan return to (Azerbaijan) Qarabağ)
10	MF	BUL	Tomi Kostadinov (to (Bulgaria) Minyor Pernik)
11	FW	COL	John Córdoba
14	MF	AZE	Asif Mirili
23	DF	AZE	Tural Narimanov
25	DF	AZE	Adil Nagiyev (loan to (Azerbaijan) Zira)

=== Baku ===
In: Note: Flags indicate national team as defined under FIFA eligibility rules; some limited exceptions apply. Players may hold more than one non-FIFA nationality.

No.	Pos.	Nation	Player
—	GK	AZE	Elchin Sadigov (loan from (Azerbaijan) Neftchi Baku)
—	MF	AZE	Ramazan Abbasov (from (Azerbaijan) Sumgayit)

Out: Note: Flags indicate national team as defined under FIFA eligibility rules; some limited exceptions apply. Players may hold more than one non-FIFA nationality.

No.	Pos.	Nation	Player
1	GK	AZE	Agil Mammadov (to (Azerbaijan) Neftchi Baku)
3	DF	SVN	Jure Travner (to (England) Reading)
8	MF	SVN	Lucas Horvat (to (Slovenia) Domžale)
18	DF	AZE	Aziz Guliyev (to (Azerbaijan) Neftchi Baku)
22	MF	SRB	Risto Ristović (to (Greece) AEL)
30	MF	AZE	Jamshid Maharramov (to (Turkey) Adanaspor)
37	MF	AZE	Mikayil Rahimov (to (Azerbaijan) Sumgayit)
—	MF	AZE	Rahman Hajiyev (to (Azerbaijan) Neftchi Baku, previously on loan to (Turkey) Gaziantep BB)

=== Gabala ===
In: Note: Flags indicate national team as defined under FIFA eligibility rules; some limited exceptions apply. Players may hold more than one non-FIFA nationality.

No.	Pos.	Nation	Player
6	MF	AZE	Rashad Sadiqov (from (Azerbaijan) Khazar Lankaran)
15	DF	AZE	Ruslan Abışov (from (Russia) Rubin Kazan)
18	FW	UKR	Ruslan Fomin (from (Ukraine) Chornomorets Odesa)
19	MF	UKR	Oleksiy Gai (from (Ukraine) Chornomorets Odesa)
22	GK	UKR	Dmytro Bezotosnyi (from (Ukraine) Chornomorets Odesa)
32	MF	BLR	Mikhail Sivakow (from (Ukraine) Chornomorets Odesa)
—	DF	BRA	Ricardinho (from (Sweden) Malmö)

Out: Note: Flags indicate national team as defined under FIFA eligibility rules; some limited exceptions apply. Players may hold more than one non-FIFA nationality.

No.	Pos.	Nation	Player
1	GK	AZE	Kamran Aghayev (to (Turkey) Kayserispor)
6	DF	AZE	Volodimir Levin
8	MF	BRA	Marquinhos
11	FW	ROU	Andrei Cristea (to (Italy) Salernitana)
21	FW	POR	Yazalde (loan return to (Portugal) S.C. Braga)

=== Inter Baku ===
In: Note: Flags indicate national team as defined under FIFA eligibility rules; some limited exceptions apply. Players may hold more than one non-FIFA nationality.

No.	Pos.	Nation	Player
22	MF	AZE	Afran Ismayilov (from (Azerbaijan) Khazar Lankaran)
23	DF	SRB	Vojislav Stanković (from (Serbia) Partizan)
82	MF	NED	Ruben Schaken (from (Netherlands) Feyenoord)
—	DF	AZE	Tural Hümbätov (from (Azerbaijan) Araz-Naxçıvan)

Out: Note: Flags indicate national team as defined under FIFA eligibility rules; some limited exceptions apply. Players may hold more than one non-FIFA nationality.

No.	Pos.	Nation	Player
9	MF	AZE	Mirzaga Huseynpur (loan to (Azerbaijan) Simurq)
14	DF	AZE	Ilgar Alakbarov (to (Azerbaijan) Khazar Lankaran)

=== Khazar Lankaran ===
In: Note: Flags indicate national team as defined under FIFA eligibility rules; some limited exceptions apply. Players may hold more than one non-FIFA nationality.

No.	Pos.	Nation	Player
6	DF	AZE	Ilgar Alakbarov (from (Azerbaijan) Inter Baku)

Out: Note: Flags indicate national team as defined under FIFA eligibility rules; some limited exceptions apply. Players may hold more than one non-FIFA nationality.

No.	Pos.	Nation	Player
3	DF	BRA	Vanderson (to (Brazil) Paulista)
5	DF	BRA	Thiego (to (Brazil) Chapecoense)
6	MF	AZE	Rashad Sadiqov (to (Azerbaijan) Gabala)
8	MF	BUL	Galin Ivanov (to (Turkey) Samsunspor)
9	MF	AZE	Ugur Pamuk (to (Azerbaijan) Sumgayit)
10	MF	AZE	Elnur Abdullayev (to (Azerbaijan) Simurq)
11	FW	AZE	Rauf Aliyev (to (Azerbaijan) Neftchi Baku)
12	GK	AZE	Jahangir Hasanzade
13	DF	AZE	Aleksandr Shemonayev (to (Azerbaijan) AZAL)
22	MF	AZE	Afran Ismayilov (to (Azerbaijan) Inter Baku)
28	MF	BRA	Fernando Gabriel (to (Iran) Persepolis)
99	MF	MKD	Dejan Blaževski (to (North Macedonia) Vardar)

=== Neftchi Baku ===
In: Note: Flags indicate national team as defined under FIFA eligibility rules; some limited exceptions apply. Players may hold more than one non-FIFA nationality.

No.	Pos.	Nation	Player
1	GK	AZE	Agil Mammadov (from (Azerbaijan) Baku)
22	FW	AZE	Rauf Aliyev (from (Azerbaijan) Khazar Lankaran)
16	DF	AZE	Aziz Guliyev (from (Azerbaijan) Baku)
17	MF	AZE	Rahman Hajiyev (from (Azerbaijan) Baku, previously on loan to (Turkey) Gaziantep BB)
—	GK	AZE	Elchin Sadigov (loan return from (Azerbaijan) Araz-Naxçıvan)

Out: Note: Flags indicate national team as defined under FIFA eligibility rules; some limited exceptions apply. Players may hold more than one non-FIFA nationality.

No.	Pos.	Nation	Player
14	DF	AZE	Elnur Allahverdiyev
16	DF	BRA	Bruno Bertucci (to (Brazil) Portuguesa)
17	MF	AZE	Nijat Gurbanov (loan to (Azerbaijan) AZAL)
23	FW	AZE	Ruslan Qurbanov (loan to (Croatia) Hajduk Split)
—	GK	AZE	Elchin Sadigov (loan to (Azerbaijan) Baku)

=== Qarabağ ===
In: Note: Flags indicate national team as defined under FIFA eligibility rules; some limited exceptions apply. Players may hold more than one non-FIFA nationality.

No.	Pos.	Nation	Player
--	MF	ESP	Dani Quintana (from (Saudi Arabia) Al-Ahli)

Out: Note: Flags indicate national team as defined under FIFA eligibility rules; some limited exceptions apply. Players may hold more than one non-FIFA nationality.

No.	Pos.	Nation	Player
8	FW	SUI	Innocent Emeghara (to (United States) San Jose Earthquakes)

=== Simurq ===
In: Note: Flags indicate national team as defined under FIFA eligibility rules; some limited exceptions apply. Players may hold more than one non-FIFA nationality.

No.	Pos.	Nation	Player
4	DF	ESP	Melli (from (Greece) Ergotelis)
7	MF	AZE	Elnur Abdullayev (from (Azerbaijan) Khazar Lankaran)
9	MF	AZE	Mirzaga Huseynpur (on loan from (Azerbaijan) Inter Baku)
22	FW	AZE	Cihan Özkara (loan from (Turkey) Sivasspor)

Out: Note: Flags indicate national team as defined under FIFA eligibility rules; some limited exceptions apply. Players may hold more than one non-FIFA nationality.

No.	Pos.	Nation	Player
9	FW	CZE	Lukáš Třešňák

=== Sumgayit ===
In: Note: Flags indicate national team as defined under FIFA eligibility rules; some limited exceptions apply. Players may hold more than one non-FIFA nationality.

No.	Pos.	Nation	Player
6	MF	AZE	Mikayil Rahimov (from (Azerbaijan) Baku)
17	FW	AZE	Pardis Fardjad-Azad
76	MF	AZE	Ugur Pamuk (from (Azerbaijan) Khazar Lankaran)

Out: Note: Flags indicate national team as defined under FIFA eligibility rules; some limited exceptions apply. Players may hold more than one non-FIFA nationality.

No.	Pos.	Nation	Player
11	FW	GER	Kiyan Soltanpour (to (Germany) Viktoria 1889)
17	MF	AZE	Ramazan Abbasov (to (Azerbaijan) Baku)
30	GK	AZE	Tarlan Ahmadli (loan to (Azerbaijan) Zira)
