= Benjamin Lambot =

Belgian footballer (born 1987)

Personal information
- Full name: Benjamin Edouard Lambot
- Date of birth: 2 May 1987 (age 39)
- Place of birth: Florennes, Belgium
- Height: 1.89 m (6 ft 2 1/2 in)
- Positions: Centre back; defensive midfielder

Team information
- Current team: Schaerbeek
- Number: 6

Youth career
- White Star Bruxelles
- –2001: RWD Molenbeek

Senior career*
Years	Team	Apps	(Gls)
2001–2009	Tubize	79	(9)
2009	→ Virton (loan)	12	(0)
2009–2012	Royal Antwerp	79	(7)
2012–2014	Lierse	40	(0)
2014–2015	Simurq	41	(0)
2015–2019	Cercle Brugge	90	(2)
2019–2020	Nea Salamina	23	(2)
2020–2021	NorthEast United	21	(2)
2021–2025	RFC Liège	113	(11)
2025–	Schaerbeek	18	(0)
- * Club domestic league appearances and goals as of 28 June 2026

Benjamin Edouard Lambot (born 2 May 1987) is a Belgian professional footballer who plays as a defender for Belgian Division 1 club Schaerbeek.

== Career ==
In January 2012, Lambot announced that he would be joining Lierse from Royal Antwerp during the summer transfer window on a free transfer. In January 2014 Lambot signed a one-year contract with the option of a second with Simurq. In December 2014, Lambot extended his Simurq contract until the end of the 2014–15 season.

In 2020, NorthEast United signed Lambot for the 2020–21 Indian Super League season on a one-year deal. He scored 2 goals in 21 appearances for the Highlander.

== Career statistics ==
As of 9 March 2021

Appearances and goals by club, season and competition
Club	Season	League	League		Cup		Continental		Total	
Club	Season	League	Apps	Goals	Apps	Goals	Apps	Goals	Apps	Goals
Antwerp	2009–10	Belgian Second Division	20	2	2	0	-		22	2
Antwerp	2010–11	Belgian Second Division	26	1	2	0	-		28	1
Antwerp	2011–12	Belgian Second Division	33	4	2	0	-		35	2
Lierse	2012–13	Jupiler Pro League	27	0	1	0	-		28	0
Lierse	2013–14	Jupiler Pro League	13	0	1	0	-		14	0
Simurq	2013–14	Azerbaijan Premier League	15	0	0	0	-		15	0
Simurq	2014–15	Azerbaijan Premier League	20	0	2	1	-		22	1
NorthEast United	2020–21	Indian Super League	21	2	0	0	-		21	2
Career total			175	9	10	1	0	0	185	10
