= Mário Sérgio (footballer, born 1977) =

Brazilian footballer

Personal information
- Full name: Mário Sérgio Aumarante Santana
- Date of birth: 30 January 1977 (age 49)
- Place of birth: Adustina, Brazil
- Height: 1.72 m (5 ft 8 in)
- Position: Midfielder

Senior career*
Years	Team	Apps	(Gls)
2001–2002	Lokomotiv Sofia		
2003–2005	Coritiba		
2004	→ Ulsan Hyundai (loan)	21	(1)
2006	Adap Galo		
2006–2007	Dubai CSC		
2007	Portuguesa		
2008–2010	Khazar Lankaran	58	(18)
2010	Inter Baku	10	(3)
2011	Simurq	3	(1)
- * Club domestic league appearances and goals as of 31 October 2013 ‡ National team caps and goals as of 31 October 2013

Mário Sérgio Aumarante Santana (born 30 January 1977 in Adustina, Brazil), known as just Mário Sérgio, Brazilian footballer who plays as a midfielder, his last known club was Simurq of the Azerbaijan Premier League.

== Career ==
Mário Sérgio joined Khazar Lankaran on 10 January 2008 from Brazilian side Portuguesa, and was the club's top goal scorer during the 2009–10 season with 13 in 28 games.

== Career statistics ==
Club performance			League		Cup		Continental		Other		Total	
Season	Club	League	Apps	Goals	Apps	Goals	Apps	Goals	Apps	Goals	Apps	Goals
Azerbaijan			League		Azerbaijan Cup		Europe		CIS Cup		Total	
2007-08	Khazar Lankaran	Azerbaijan Premier League	10	4	17	1	—		6	3	16	8
2008-09	Khazar Lankaran	Azerbaijan Premier League	20	5	17	0	0	0	—		20	5
2009-10	Khazar Lankaran	Azerbaijan Premier League	28	9	17	4	—		—		28	13
2010-11	Khazar Lankaran	Azerbaijan Premier League	0	0	0	0	2	0	—		2	0
2010-11	Inter Baku	Azerbaijan Premier League	10	3	0	0	-		—		10	3
2010-11	Simurq	Azerbaijan Premier League	3	1	0	0	-		—		3	1
Total	Azerbaijan		71	22	17	5	2	0	6	3	96	33
Career total			71	22	17	5	2	0	6	3	96	33

== Honours ==
- Coritiba
  - Campeonato Paranaense (1) - 2003
- Khazar Lankaran
  - Azerbaijan Cup (1) - 2007–08
