= Denis Calincov =

Moldovan football striker

Personal information
- Full name: Denis Calincov
- Date of birth: 15 September 1985 (age 41)
- Place of birth: Chișinău, Moldavian SSR
- Height: 1.76 m (5 ft 9 in)
- Position: Striker

Youth career
- Zimbru Chişinău

Senior career*
Years	Team	Apps	(Gls)
2001–2002	Zimbru Chişinău	5	(1)
2002–2005	Anderlecht	0	(0)
2004	→ Heerenveen (loan)	2	(0)
2005–2006	Heracles Almelo	14	(2)
2006–2009	Cambuur	24	(0)
2009	Academia Chişinău	7	(0)
2009–2010	Khazar Lankaran	25	(5)
2010–2011	CSKA Chişinău	9	(3)
2012	Dacia Chișinău	4	(0)
2013	Rapid Ghidighici	16	(2)
2014	Academia Chișinău	12	(8)
2014	Veris Chişinău	13	(4)
2015	Tiraspol	7	(1)
2016	Speranța Nisporeni	1	(0)
2017	Spicul Chișcăreni	0	(0)
Total		139	(26)

International career
2003–2011	Moldova	20	(2)

Managerial career
- 2016–2018: Spicul Chișcăreni
- 2020: Codru Lozova
- * Club domestic league appearances and goals

Denis Calincov (born 15 September 1985) is a Moldovan football manager and former professional footballer who played as a striker. He has played international matches for Moldova.

== Club career ==
Calincov joined Anderlecht on a three-year deal at the age of 16 from CSF Zimbru Chisinau in his homeland. A combination of injuries and form frustrated his attempts to make a first-team appearance at Anderlecht. In 2004 the left winger joined Dutch UEFA Cup entrants SC Heerenveen making only two appearances for the club. He was then signed for the 2005 campaign by Heracles Almelo. He was injured for almost a year, after tearing a muscle in his abdomen.

Later followed a two-year stay by SC Cambuur without any success. He returned to his home country, Moldova to play for Academia UTM Chişinău.

In Summer 2009, he signed for Azerbaijani club, Khazar Lankaran.

== International career ==
Calincov attracted the attention of several major clubs across Europe at the 2002 UEFA European Under-17 Championship in Denmark. Moldova lost all three games in the tournament, but Calincov scored five goals. He has also been capped at U19, U21 and senior level.

== Managerial career ==
Calincov started managing Spicul Chișcăreni, before being appointed head coach of Codru Lozova in 2020.

== International goals ==
Scores and results list Moldova's goal tally first.

No	Date	Venue	Opponent	Score	Result	Competition
1.	10 June 2009	Haradski Stadium, Barysaw, Belarus	Belarus	1–2	2–2	Friendly match
2.	10 October 2009	Ramat Gan Stadium, Ramat Gan, Israel	Israel	1–3	1–3	2010 World Cup qualifier
