= Adam Banaś =

Polish footballer (born 1982)

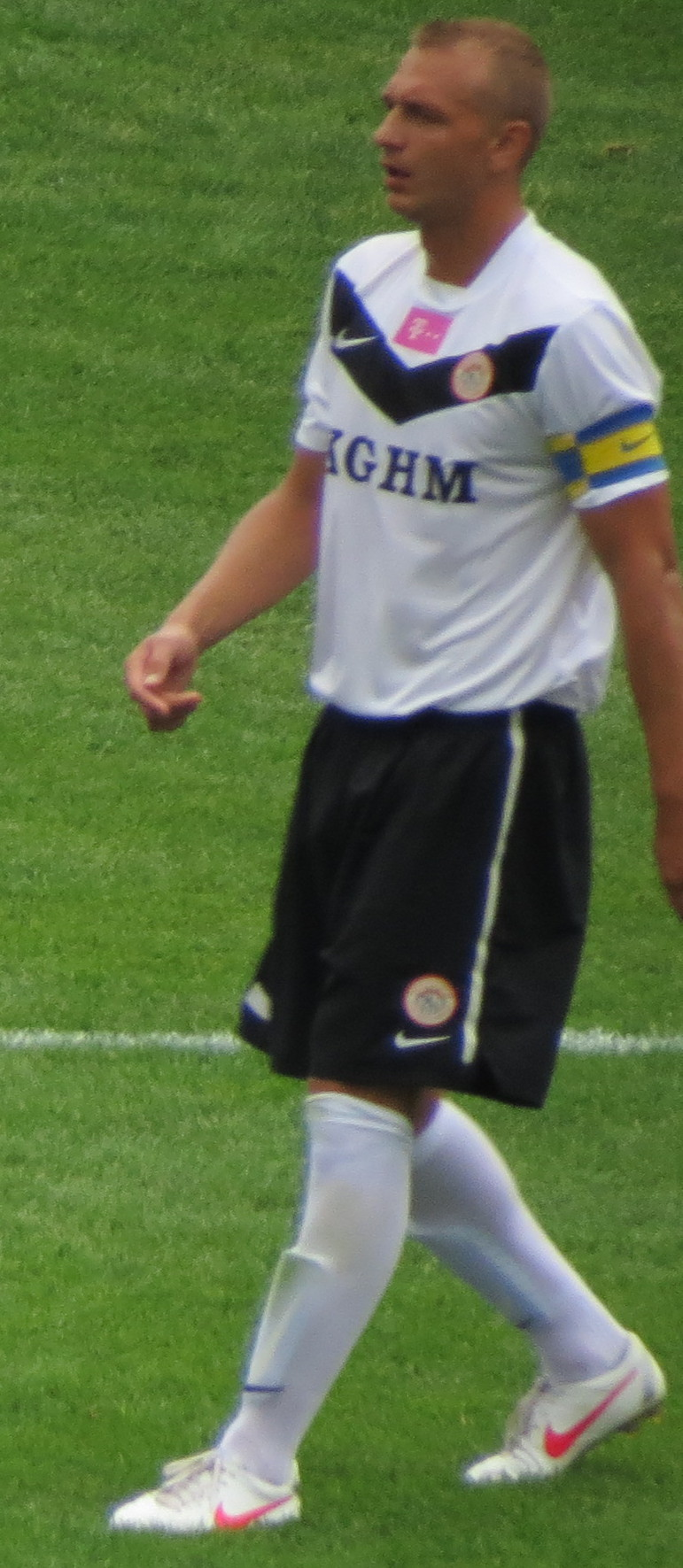
- Banaś during a friendly match against Roma in 2012

Personal information
- Full name: Adam Banaś
- Date of birth: 25 December 1982 (age 43)
- Place of birth: Bytom, Poland
- Height: 1.85 m (6 ft 1 in)
- Position: Centre back

Youth career
- Ruch Radzionków

Senior career*
Years	Team	Apps	(Gls)
2000–2005	Ruch Radzionków		
2005–2008	Piast Gliwice	95	(3)
2009–2011	Górnik Zabrze	61	(6)
2012–2014	Zagłębie Lubin	57	(4)
2014–2015	Simurq	13	(1)
- * Club domestic league appearances and goals

Adam Banaś (born 25 December 1982 in Bytom) is a Polish former professional footballer who played as a defender.

== Career ==
=== Club ===
In January 2009, Banaś signed a contract with Górnik Zabrze.

In the summer of 2014, Banaś signed a one-year contract with Simurq in the Azerbaijan Premier League.

== Honours ==
Individual

- Ekstraklasa Player of the Month: April 2012
