= Giorgi Seturidze =

Georgian footballer

George Seturidze
Personal information
- Date of birth: 8 April 1985 (age 41)
- Place of birth: Tbilisi, Soviet Union
- Height: 1.79 m (5 ft 10 in)
- Position: Midfielder

Team information
- Current team: FC Einheit Rudolstadt
- Number: 11

Senior career*
Years	Team	Apps	(Gls)
2003–2004	FC Mtskheta-Urioni-2 Mtskheta	21	(0)
2004–2006	FC Lokomotivi Tbilisi	30	(0)
2006	FC Dinamo Batumi	13	(0)
2006–2007	FC Olimpi Rustavi	24	(1)
2007–2008	FC Carl Zeiss Jena	1	(0)
2008–2009	FC Olimpi Rustavi	30	(2)
2009–2010	FK Standard Sumgayit	26	(2)
2010–2011	FK Ganja	18	(0)
2011	FC Torpedo Kutaisi	20	(0)
2011–2012	FC Metalurgi Rustavi	27	(1)
2012–2014	FC Dinamo Tbilisi	39	(0)
2014	FC Metalurgi Rustavi	13	(0)
2014–2015	FC Dila Gori	27	(1)
2015–	FC Einheit Rudolstadt	147	(3)

International career
2006–2009	Georgia	5	(0)
- * Club domestic league appearances and goals as of 12 November 2022

Giorgi Seturidze (Georgian: გიორგი სეთურიძე; born 8 April 1985) is a Georgian footballer who plays in Germany for fifth-tier club FC Einheit Rudolstadt.
