= Ufuk Budak =

Azerbaijani footballer (born 1990)

Personal information
- Date of birth: 26 May 1990 (age 36)
- Place of birth: Heidenheim, West Germany
- Height: 1.82 m (6 ft 0 in)
- Position: Left back

Youth career
- SSV Ulm

Senior career*
Years	Team	Apps	(Gls)
2009–2010	SSV Ulm	8	(0)
2010–2012	SC Freiburg II	43	(0)
2012–2014	Eskişehirspor	0	(0)
2014–2016	Gaziantep BB	64	(1)
2016–2017	Kayserispor	12	(1)
2017	Manisaspor	13	(1)
2017–2018	Samsunspor	20	(0)
2018–2019	Boluspor	24	(0)
2019–2021	Altınordu	52	(0)
2021	Bursaspor	1	(0)
2021–2024	Erzurumspor	41	(0)

International career^{‡}
2010–2011	Azerbaijan U21	1	(0)
2011–	Azerbaijan	17	(0)
- * Club domestic league appearances and goals as of 11 May 2024 ‡ National team caps and goals as of 3 June 2016

Ufuk Budak (born 26 May 1990) is an Azerbaijani professional footballer who plays as a left-back.

== Personal life ==
Budak is of ethnic Turkish descent.
