= Tihhon Šišov =

Estonian footballer

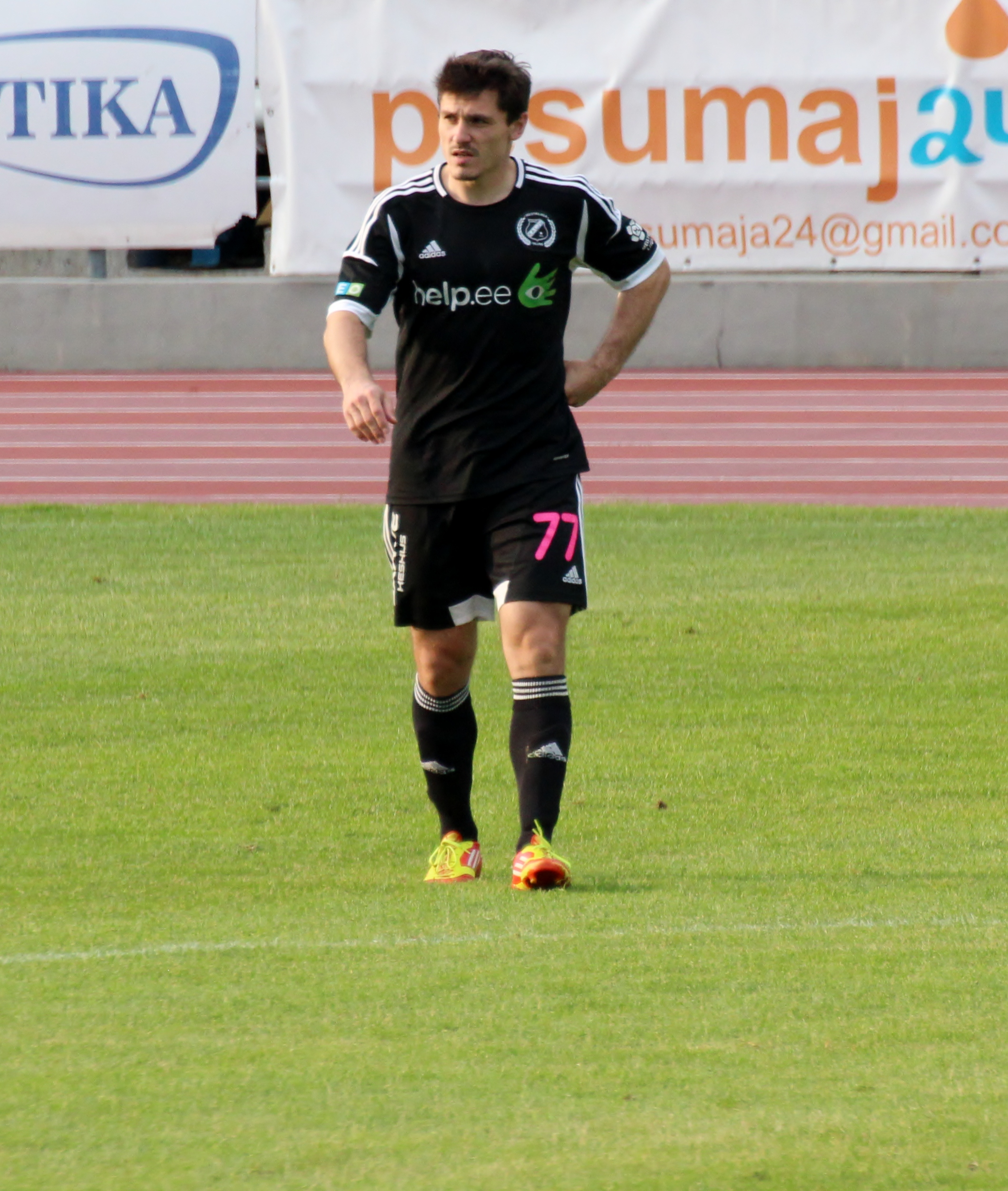

Personal information
- Full name: Tihhon Šišov
- Date of birth: 11 February 1983 (age 43)
- Place of birth: Tallinn, then part of Estonian SSR, Soviet Union
- Height: 1.73 m (5 ft 8 in)
- Position: Defender

Team information
- Current team: FC Tallinn
- Number: 36

Youth career
- 1991–2000: FC Puuma Tallinn

Senior career*
| Years | Team | Apps | (Gls) |
| 1999–2000 | Puuma | 29 | (0) |
| 2000–2008 | Levadia | 193 | (2) |
| 2001 | → Pärnu Levadia | 7 | (1) |
| 2009 | Győri ETO | 0 | (0) |
| 2009 | Levadia | 29 | (1) |
| 2010–2011 | Khazar Lankaran | 9 | (0) |
| 2012–2014 | Nõmme Kalju | 72 | (2) |
| 2014–2015 | Sillamäe Kalev | 32 | (0) |
| 2017–2018 | Maardu Linnameeskond | 33 | (1) |
| 2018- | FC Tallinn | 93 | (16) |

International career^{‡}
| | Estonia U17 | 6 | (0) |
| | Estonia U19 | 2 | (0) |
| | Estonia U21 | 13 | (0) |
| 2004–2014 | Estonia | 42 | (0) |
- * Club domestic league appearances and goals as of 22 November 2023 ‡ National team caps and goals as of 31 December 2016

Tihhon Šišov (born 11 February 1983, in Tallinn) is an Estonian footballer, who plays for FC Tallinn in Estonian Esiliiga.

== Position ==
He plays the position of defender and is 1.73 m tall and weighs 77 kg.

== Club career ==
=== To Hungary and back ===
In December 2008 he went on a trial to Nemzeti Bajnokság I side Győri ETO FC and later signed a 3,5-year deal with the club, alongside teammate Tarmo Kink. Only a week later the club wanted to drop the player. Šišov opted against appealing to FIFA as he and the clubs involved found a solution. The contract was mutually terminated and the player returned to Levadia. At the end of the 2009 Meistriliiga season, he declined new contract offers from Levadia as he wanted to test himself outside Estonia.

=== Feud with Khazar Lankaran ===
In January 2010, he signed a two-year contract with Azerbaijan Premier League club FK Khazar Lankaran. After half a year and 9 appearances in the league, the club decided to send the player home. Khazar transfer listed the player for around $50,000. This time Šišov asked FIFA for help as the team did not pay the wages nor release the needed papers to join another club, but with no success.

=== Back to Estonia ===
The player trained at his old club, FC Levadia Tallinn, until the end of 2010. After that with another Estonian club JK Nõmme Kalju, although still unable to play competitive club football. He eventually signed a one-year contract with the club on 6 February 2012, after almost 400 days of "trial". He made the league debut for the club on 10 March 2012, in a goalless draw against city rivals FC Levadia Tallinn.

== International career ==
Šišov has played 40 international games for the Estonia national football team. Despite the fact that he didn't play club football for almost two years due to contract issues in Azerbaijan, he regularly featured in Tarmo Rüütli's team during that time.

== Career statistics ==
=== Club ===
| Season | Club | Country | Level | Apps | Goals |
|---|---|---|---|---|---|
| 2018 | Maardu Linnameeskond | Estonia | II | 14 | 1 |
| 2017 | Maardu Linnameeskond | Estonia | II | 19 | 0 |
| 2015 | JK Sillamäe Kalev | Estonia | I | 19 | 0 |
| 2014 | JK Nõmme Kalju | Estonia | I | 20 | 0 |
| 2013 | JK Nõmme Kalju | Estonia | I | 18 | 0 |
| 2012 | JK Nõmme Kalju | Estonia | I | 34 | 2 |
| 2011–12 | FK Khazar Lankaran | Azerbaijan | I | 0 | 0 |
| 2010–11 | FK Khazar Lankaran | Azerbaijan | I | 0 | 0 |
| 2009–10 | FK Khazar Lankaran | Azerbaijan | I | 9 | 0 |
| 2009 | FC Levadia Tallinn | Estonia | I | 29 | 1 |
| 2009 | Győri ETO FC | Hungary | I | 0 | 0 |
| 2008 | FC Levadia Tallinn | Estonia | I | 34 | 0 |
| 2007 | FC Levadia Tallinn | Estonia | I | 23 | 1 |
| 2006 | FC Levadia Tallinn | Estonia | I | 28 | 0 |
| 2005 | FC Levadia Tallinn | Estonia | I | 34 | 0 |
| 2004 | FC Levadia Tallinn | Estonia | I | 27 | 0 |
| 2003 | FC Levadia Maardu | Estonia | I | 9 | 0 |
| 2002 | FC Levadia Tallinn | Estonia | I | 24 | 1 |
| 2001 | FC Levadia Maardu | Estonia | I | 12 | 0 |
| 2001 | FC Levadia Pärnu | Estonia | II | 7 | 1 |
| 2000 | FC Levadia Maardu | Estonia | I | 2 | 0 |
| 2000 | FC Puuma Tallinn | Estonia | III | 14 | 0 |
| 1999 | FC Puuma Tallinn | Estonia | IV | 15 | 0 |

== Honours ==
=== Club ===
- FC Levadia Tallinn
  - Estonian Top Division: 2000, 2004, 2006, 2007, 2008, 2009
    - runners up: 2005
  - Estonian Cup: 2000, 2002, 2004, 2005, 2007
  - Estonian SuperCup
    - runners up: 2004, 2005, 2007
- Maardu Linnameeskond
  - Estonian Second Division: 2017, 2018
