= Cihan Özkara =

Azerbaijani footballer (born 1991)

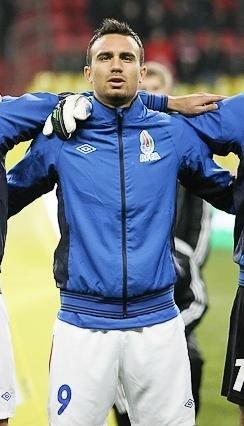
- Özkara with Azerbaijan in 2012

Personal information
- Date of birth: 14 July 1991 (age 35)
- Place of birth: Hamm, Germany
- Height: 1.89 m (6 ft 2 in)
- Position: Forward

Youth career
- 1999–2007: LR Ahlen
- 2007–2008: Arminia Bielefeld
- 2008–2009: Rot Weiss Ahlen

Senior career*
Years	Team	Apps	(Gls)
2009–2011	Rot Weiss Ahlen	32	(1)
2011–2015	Sivasspor	36	(3)
2012	→ Kayseri Erciyesspor (loan)	4	(0)
2015	→ Simurq (loan)	12	(0)
2015–2017	Preußen Münster	28	(1)
2017–2018	SC Verl	19	(6)
2018–2020	Rot-Weiß Oberhausen	45	(16)
2020	İstanbulspor	0	(0)
2020–2022	Afjet Afyonspor	49	(15)
2022	Sarıyer	15	(3)
2022–2024	Rot Weiss Ahlen	44	(5)

International career^{‡}
2011	Azerbaijan U21	6	(3)
2012–	Azerbaijan	18	(1)
- * Club domestic league appearances and goals as of 16:28, 4 July 2024 (UTC) ‡ National team caps and goals as of 9 February 2014

Cihan Özkara (born 14 July 1991) is a German-born Azerbaijani professional footballer who most recently played as a forward for German club Rot Weiss Ahlen.

== Career ==
Özkara was born in Hamm. He began his career with LR Ahlen and played eight years before joining Arminia Bielefeld in summer 2007. After one year with Arminia Bielefeld, he returned to Rot Weiss Ahlen where he made his senior debut on 22 September 2009 against Greuther Fürth in the DFB-Pokal. He signed on 6 October 2009 his first professional contract until 30 June 2012.

On 30 January 2015, Özkara signed for Simurq PIK on loan till the end of the 2014–15 season.

On 4 September 2020, Özkara a three-year contract with İstanbulspor.

== Career statistics ==
Appearances and goals by national team and year
National team	Year	Apps	Goals
Azerbaijan	2012	7	1
Azerbaijan	2013	6	0
Azerbaijan	2014	5	0
Total		18	1

Score and result list Azerbaijan's goal tally first, score column indicates score after each Özkara goal.

International goal scored by Cihan Özkara
No.	Date	Venue	Opponent	Score	Result	Competition
1	15 August 2012	Baku, Azerbaijan	Bahrain	2–0	3–0	Friendly
