= Lukáš Třešňák =

Czech footballer

Personal information
- Date of birth: 3 May 1988 (age 38)
- Place of birth: Czechoslovakia
- Height: 1.78 m (5 ft 10 in)
- Position: Forward

Senior career*
Years	Team	Apps	(Gls)
2010–2011	Sparta Prague	7	(1)
2011	→ Jablonec (loan)	12	(3)
2011–2014	Jablonec	73	(4)
2014	Simurq	8	(0)
- * Club domestic league appearances and goals as of 10 December 2014

Lukáš Třešňák (born 3 May 1988) is a professional Czech football player who most recently played for Simurq.

== Career ==
In August 2014, Třešňák signed for Azerbaijan Premier League side Simurq, but was released by Sumurq in December of the same year after only eight appearances.
