= Nadir Benchenaa =

Swedish footballer of Algerian origin

Personal information
- Full name: Nadir Mohamed Benchenaa
- Date of birth: February 2, 1984 (age 42)
- Place of birth: Stockholm, Sweden
- Height: 1.84 m (6 ft 1/2 in)
- Position: Midfielder

Youth career
- 1999–2000: Hammarby IF
- 2000–2003: Stade Rennais

Senior career*
Years	Team	Apps	(Gls)
2003–2004	Hammarby IF	18	(0)
2005	→ Örgryte IS (loan)	10	(0)
2006	Assyriska FF	22	(0)
2007	Gröndals IK	?	(3)
2008	SV Babelsberg 03	5	(0)
2008	U.R. Namur	3	(0)
2009	FK Khazar Lankaran	4	(0)
2009–2010	Dalkurd FF		
2010–2011	WA Tlemcen	0	(0)

International career^{‡}
2004	Sweden U21	2	(0)
- * Club domestic league appearances and goals as of 00:00, 10 March 2011 (UTC) ‡ National team caps and goals as of 00:00, 10 March 2011 (UTC)

Nadir Mohamed Benchenaa (born February 2, 1984, in Stockholm) is a Swedish footballer of Algerian origin. He is retired.

== Career ==
Benchenaa started his career at Hammarby IF before joining Stade Rennais in June 2000 for 2.8million SEK. Benchenaa stayed in France for three years, won the Gambardella Cup in 2003, and had a trial with Aston Villa during the 2000–01 season, before returning to Hammarby in the summer of 2003 and joining Örgryte IS on loan for the 2005 season. After his loan deal Benchenaa was sold to Assyriska on a two-year contract, of which he only stayed for one before leaving for Gröndals in February 2007. In January 2008 he moved to Germany with SV Babelsberg 03 for six months, before heading to Union Royale Namur in Belgium for another six months before signing for Khazar Lankaran in January 2009. Benchenaa returned to Sweden in the summer of 2009, joining Dalkurd with whom he spent a year before once again moving abroad, this time with Algerian Ligue 1 side WA Tlemcen.

Benchenaa has also represented Sweden internationally at U-21 level.

== Career statistics ==
Club statistics
Club performance			League		Cup		Continental		Total	
Season	Club	League	Apps	Goals	Apps	Goals	Apps	Goals	Apps	Goals
2003	Hammarby	Allsvenskan	7	0			—		7	0
2004	Hammarby	Allsvenskan	11	0			2	0	13	0
2005	Örgryte (loan)	Allsvenskan	10	0			—		10	0
2006	Assyriska	Superettan	22	0			—		22	0
2007	Gröndal	Division 1					—			
2007–08	SV Babelsberg 03	Regionalliga	5	0			—			
2008-09	Union Royale Namur	Belgacom League	3	0			—		3	0
2008–09	Khazar Lanakran	Azerbaijan Premier League	4	0	0	0	—		4	0
2009	Dalkurd	Division 2					—			
2010	Dalkurd	Division 1					—			
2010–11	WA Tlemcen	Ligue 1					—			
Total	Sweden		50	0			2	0	52	0
Total	Germany		5				-		5	
Total	Belgium		3				-		3	
Total	Azerbaijan		4	0	0	0	-		4	0
Total	Algeria						-			
Career total			62	0	0	0	2	0	64	0
