= Ali Gökdemir =

Azerbaijani footballer (born 1991)

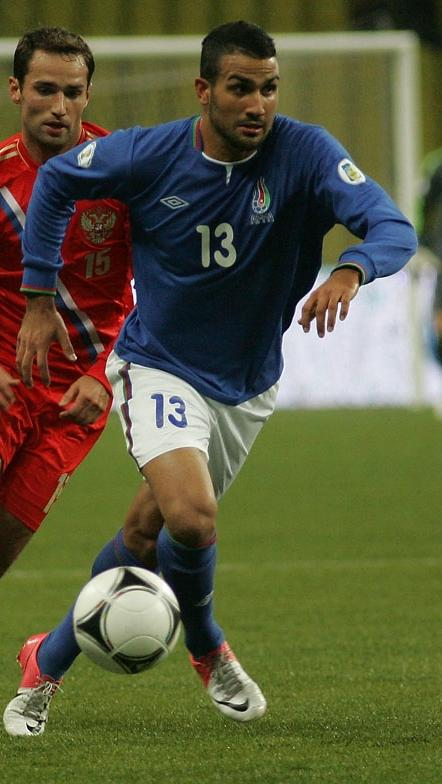
- Gökdemir with Azerbaijan in 2012

Personal information
- Full name: Ali Gutda Gökdemir
- Date of birth: 17 September 1991 (age 35)
- Place of birth: Schwäbisch Hall, Germany
- Position: Defender

Youth career
- Sportfreunde Schwäbisch Hall
- TSV Ilshofen
- –2009: VfB Stuttgart
- 2009–2010: Hannover 96

Senior career*
Years	Team	Apps	(Gls)
2010–2014	Hannover 96 II	64	(5)
2013–2014	Hannover 96	0	(0)
2014	→ Elazığspor (loan)	1	(0)
2014–2015	Simurq	20	(1)
Total		85	(6)

International career
- Azerbaijan U21
2012–2013	Azerbaijan	10	(0)
- * Club domestic league appearances and goals

Ali Gutda Gökdemir (born 17 September 1991) is a former professional footballer who played as a defender. Born in Germany, he represented Azerbaijan at international level.

== Club career ==
Gökdemir played club football in Germany for Hannover 96 II. For the second half of the 2013–14 season he was on loan to Süper Lig side Elazığspor.

In July 2014, Gökdemir moved to Azerbaijan Premier League side Simurq. Despite having had a contract with Hannover until 2015, he was released without a transfer fee.

== International career ==
Gökdemir made his international debut for Azerbaijan in 2012, and appeared in FIFA World Cup qualifying matches. He also played for Azerbaijan U21.

== Personal life ==
Gökdemir is of Turkish descent. Gökdemir retired from football in December 2015 due family reasons.

== Career statistics ==
=== Club ===
Appearances and goals by club, season and competition
Club	Season	League			Cup		Continental		Total	
Club	Season	Division	Apps	Goals	Apps	Goals	Apps	Goals	Apps	Goals
Hannover 96 II	2010–11	Regionalliga Nord	14	0	–		–		14	0
Hannover 96 II	2011–12	Regionalliga Nord	19	1	–		–		19	1
Hannover 96 II	2012–13	Regionalliga Nord	16	2	–		–		16	2
Hannover 96 II	2013–14	Regionalliga Nord	15	2	–		–		15	2
Hannover 96 II	Total		64	5	0	0	–		64	5
Elazığspor (loan)	2013–14	Süper Lig	1	0	2	0	–		3	0
Simurq	2014–15	Azerbaijan Premier League	20	1	4	1	–		24	2
Career total			85	6	6	1	–		91	7

=== International ===
Appearances and goals by national team and year
National team	Year	Apps	Goals
Azerbaijan	2012	7	0
Azerbaijan	2013	3	0
Azerbaijan	2014	0	0
Total		10	0
