= Rômulo (footballer, born 1976) =

Brazilian footballer

Rômulo úpide Nor
Personal information
- Full name: Rômulo Silvano da Silva
- Date of birth: 26 August 1976 (age 50)
- Place of birth: Brazil
- Height: 1.77 m (5 ft 9 1/2 in)
- Position: Forward

Team information
- Current team: Ferroviário

Senior career*
Years	Team	Apps	(Gls)
1999	Ceará		
2000	Ferroviário		
2001	Sport Recife		
2002	Náutico		
2002–2004	Nacional		
2004–2005	Estrela		
2005–2006	Al-Wakrah		
2006–2007	Atlético Goianiense		
2007–2008	Fortaleza		
2008–2009	Khazar Lankaran	22	(8)
2009–2010	Ceará pai degua		
2011–	Ferroviário		
- * Club domestic league appearances and goals

Rômulo Silvano da Silva, commonly known as Rômulo (born 26 August 1976) is a Brazilian football forward who plays for Ferroviário.

== Playing career ==
In the summer of 2008, Rômulo signed with Azerbaijan Premier League side Khazar Lankaran. Following a year in Azerbaijan he returned to Brazil for family reasons, and signed for Ceará.

Following his release from Khazar, Rômulo claim that he had not been paid in full for his time with Khazar, a matter that was taken to FIFA. In April 2012 FIFA recognised that the debt to Rômulo had been paid by Khazar on 30 March 2012 and that the 6 points stripped from Khazar was a mistake and they would be given back to them.

== Club statistics Azerbaijan ==
Club performance			League		Cup		Continental		Total	
Season	Club	League	Apps	Goals	Apps	Goals	Apps	Goals	Apps	Goals
Azerbaijan			League		Azerbaijan Cup		Europe		Total	
2008–09	Khazar Lankaran	Azerbaijan Premier League	22	8	3	0	-		25	8
Total	Azerbaijan		22	8	3	0	—		25	8
Career total			22	8	3	0	—		25	8

== Honours ==
- Fortaleza
  - Campeonato Cearense 2008
- Ceará
  - Campeonato Cearense 1999
