= Kostadin Dzhambazov =

Bulgarian footballer

Personal information
- Date of birth: 6 July 1980 (age 46)
- Place of birth: Burgas, Bulgaria
- Height: 1.87 m (6 ft 2 in)
- Position: Defender

Senior career*
Years	Team	Apps	(Gls)
1997–2003	Chernomorets Burgas	101	(12)
2003–2005	Litex Lovech	16	(0)
2005–2006	Naftex Burgas	21	(2)
2006–2007	Slavia Sofia	28	(0)
2007–2009	FK Khazar Lenkoran	45	(3)
2010–2011	Neftochimic 1986	?	(?)
2011	Nesebar	9	(1)
Total		220	(18)

Managerial career
- 2011–2012: Neftochimic 1986 (sport director)
- 2013–2015: Neftochimic 1986 (youth academy director)
- * Club domestic league appearances and goals as of 14 September 2015

Kostadin Dzhambazov (Bulgarian Cyrillic: Костадин Джамбазов; born 6 July 1980 in Burgas) is a former Bulgarian footballer, who played as a defender.
