= Renato Queirós =

Portuguese footballer

Personal information
- Full name: Renato Moreira Nunes de Queirós
- Date of birth: 20 July 1977 (age 49)
- Place of birth: Amarante, Portugal
- Height: 1.74 m (5 ft 9 in)
- Position: Forward

Youth career
- 1987–1995: Amarante

Senior career*
Years	Team	Apps	(Gls)
1995–1997	Amarante		
1997–1998	Felgueiras	7	(0)
1998–1999	Lixa	28	(10)
1999	Felgueiras	3	(0)
2000	Lixa	17	(2)
2000–2002	Sanjoanense	65	(30)
2002–2004	Paços Ferreira	49	(9)
2004–2005	União Leiria	7	(0)
2005–2008	Paços Ferreira	35	(4)
2008–2009	Khazar	3	(0)
2009–2010	Feirense	17	(1)
2010–2012	Boavista	26	(4)
Total		257	(60)
- * Club domestic league appearances and goals

Renato Moreira Nunes de Queirós (born 20 July 1977) is a Portuguese retired footballer who played as a forward.

== Club career ==
Born in Amarante, Porto District, Queirós started playing football with hometown club Amarante FC. He would go on to represent modest Portuguese sides: F.C. Felgueiras, F.C. Lixa and A.D. Sanjoanense (with whom, in 2001–02 season, he scored four goals in as many games in the Portuguese Cup).

Subsequently, Queirós made his debut in the Primeira Liga, with F.C. Paços de Ferreira, where he netted 11 times in 54 official appearances, moving to U.D. Leiria for 2004–05. He rejoined the former for three further campaigns but, having been rarely used, signed for Khazar Lankaran FK of the Azerbaijan Premier League in July 2008.

Unsettled, Queirós returned home after only one year, joining second division team C.D. Feirense. In the summer of 2010 the 33-year-old moved to Boavista FC, retiring in January 2012 due to injury problems.
