= Devran Ayhan =

Turkish football player

Personal information
- Full name: Devran Ayhan
- Date of birth: March 25, 1978 (age 48)
- Place of birth: Batman, Turkey
- Height: 1.72 m (5 ft 7 1/2 in)
- Position: Defensive midfielder

Senior career*
Years	Team	Apps	(Gls)
1995–1997	Gebzespor	17	(0)
1997–1998	Batman Petrolspor	32	(5)
1998–2002	Çaykur Rizespor	105	(8)
2002–2005	Gaziantepspor	70	(3)
2005–2006	Kayseri Erciyesspor	33	(1)
2006–2007	Ankaraspor	14	(2)
2007–2008	Ankaragücü	15	(0)
2008–2009	Kocaelispor	0	(0)
2009–2010	Khazar Lankaran	45	(1)
2010–2011	Qarabağ	14	(0)
- * Club domestic league appearances and goals as of 9 August 2013

Devran Ayhan (born March 25, 1978, in Batman, Turkey) is a Turkish football player. He most recently played for FK Qarabağ in Azerbaijan.

Devran played in 45 Azerbaijan Premier League games for Khazar Lankaran before mutually agreeing to terminate his contract in the summer of 2010, after playing in Khazar Lankaran's two UEFA Europa League games against Olimpia of Moldova.

He had previously played for Gebzespor, B. Petrolspor, Çaykur Rizespor, Gaziantepspor, Kayseri Erciyesspor, Ankaraspor and Ankaragücü in Turkey

== Career statistics ==
As of 9 August 2013

Club performance			League		Cup		Continental		Total	
Season	Club	League	Apps	Goals	Apps	Goals	Apps	Goals	Apps	Goals
Azerbaijan			League		Azerbaijan Cup		Europe		Total	
2008–09	Khazar Lankaran	Azerbaijan Premier League	20	1	3	0	—		23	1
2009–10	Khazar Lankaran	Azerbaijan Premier League	25	0	1	0	—		26	0
2010–11	Khazar Lankaran	Azerbaijan Premier League	0	0	0	0	2	0	2	0
2010–11	Qarabağ	Azerbaijan Premier League	14	0	3	0	—		17	0
Total	Azerbaijan		59	1	7	0	2	0	68	1
Career total			59	1	7	0	2	0	68	1
