= 2010–11 FK Khazar Lankaran season =

Khazar Lankaran
2010–11 season
- President: Mubariz Mansimov
- Manager: Mircea Rednic
- Stadium: Lankaran City Stadium
- Premier League: 2nd
- Azerbaijan Cup: Winners
- Europa League: 1st Qualifying Round
- Top goalscorer: League: Winston Parks (8); All: Winston Parks (12)
- Highest home attendance: 13,500 vs Inter Baku; 12 September 2010
- Lowest home attendance: 1,000 vs MOIK Baku; 21 August 2010
- Average home league attendance: 10,188
Home colours	Away colours

The Khazar Lankaran 2010–11 season is Khazar Lankaran's sixth Azerbaijan Premier League season. It was Khazar's first season under Mircea Rednic. Khazar finished the season in 2nd place and also competed in and won the Azerbaijan Cup. Due to their 3rd-placed finish the previous season, Khazar entered the Europa League at the first qualifying round stage where they were knocked out by FC Olimpia of Moldova.

== Squad ==
Note: Flags indicate national team as defined under FIFA eligibility rules; some limited exceptions apply. Players may hold more than one non-FIFA nationality.

No.	Pos.	Nation	Player
1	GK	AZE	Kamran Agayev
2	DF	AZE	Elnur Allahverdiyev
3	DF	ALB	Elvin Beqiri
5	MF	BRA	Diego Souza
6	DF	POR	Bruno Simão
7	DF	AZE	Ruslan Poladov
8	DF	ROU	Nicolae Muşat (Loan from Dinamo București)
9	FW	ROU	Alexandru Piţurcă
10	MF	AZE	Elnur Abdullayev
11	MF	ROU	Andrei Mureşan
12	GK	UKR	Yevhen Kopyl
14	DF	AZE	Rahid Amirguliev
15	FW	NGR	Emeka Opara
16	MF	ROU	Adrian Piţ

No.	Pos.	Nation	Player
17	MF	ROU	Hristu Chiacu (Loan from Dinamo București)
18	MF	AZE	Alim Gurbanov
19	MF	GUI	Ibrahima Bangoura
23	DF	AZE	Shahriyar Khalilov
26	GK	AZE	Orkhan Sadigli
27	DF	ROU	Adrian Scarlatache (Loan from Dinamo București)
28	DF	ROU	Cosmin Frăsinescu (Loan from Gloria Bistriţa)
30	MF	ROU	Cătălin Doman
36	FW	CRC	Winston Parks (Loan from Politehnica Timișoara)
55	MF	AZE	Tural Jalilov
77	DF	ROU	Stelian Stancu
84	MF	SLE	Julius Wobay
—	DF	EST	Tihhon Šišov

== Transfers ==
=== Summer ===
In: Note: Flags indicate national team as defined under FIFA eligibility rules; some limited exceptions apply. Players may hold more than one non-FIFA nationality.

No.	Pos.	Nation	Player
2	DF	AZE	Elnur Allahverdiyev (from (Azerbaijan) Qarabağ)
8	MF	ROU	Constantin Arbănaș (from (Moldova) Sheriff Tiraspol)
9	FW	ARG	Diego Ruíz (from (Romania) CFR Cluj)
10	FW	AZE	Khagani Mammadov (from (Azerbaijan) FK Karvan)
11	FW	AZE	Asif Mammadov (from (Azerbaijan) Inter Baku)
21	DF	ROU	Adrian Iordache (to (Romania) Rapid București)
30	MF	ROU	Cătălin Doman (to (Romania) Argeș Pitești)
31	GK	LAT	Deniss Romanovs (to (Czech Republic) Slavia Prague)
55	MF	AZE	Tural Jalilov (from (Azerbaijan) Simurq)
77	MF	ROU	Stelian Stancu (to (Romania) Braşov)

Out: Note: Flags indicate national team as defined under FIFA eligibility rules; some limited exceptions apply. Players may hold more than one non-FIFA nationality.

No.	Pos.	Nation	Player
1	GK	AZE	Dmitriy Kramarenko (to (Azerbaijan) Inter Baku)
6	DF	CZE	Tomas Ineman
9	FW	BUL	Ivan Tsvetkov (to (Bulgaria) Pirin Blagoevgrad)
9	FW	AZE	Zaur Ramazanov
10	MF	AZE	Jeyhun Sultanov (to (Azerbaijan) Ganja)
20	FW	MDA	Denis Calincov (to (Moldova) CSCA–Rapid Chişinău)
23	MF	AZE	Nizami Hajiyev (to (Azerbaijan) Inter Baku)
30	MF	BRA	Mario Sergio (to (Azerbaijan) Inter Baku)
72	MF	TUR	Devran Ayhan (to (Azerbaijan) Qarabağ)
77	DF	SVK	Ivan Pecha (to (Belarus) Neman Grodno)

=== Winter ===
In: Note: Flags indicate national team as defined under FIFA eligibility rules; some limited exceptions apply. Players may hold more than one non-FIFA nationality.

No.	Pos.	Nation	Player
6	DF	POR	Bruno Simão (from (Romania) Astra Ploieşti)
8	DF	ROU	Nicolae Muşat (Loan from (Romania) Dinamo București)
9	FW	ROU	Alexandru Piţurcă (from (Romania) Universitatea Craiova)
10	MF	AZE	Elnur Abdullayev (from (Azerbaijan) FK Mughan)
11	MF	ROU	Andrei Mureșan (from (Romania) Gloria Bistriţa)
12	GK	UKR	Yevhen Kopyl (from (Ukraine) Zorya Luhansk)
16	MF	ROU	Adrian Piţ (from (Romania) Universitatea Cluj)
17	MF	ROU	Hristu Chiacu (Loan from (Romania) Dinamo București)
19	MF	GUI	Ibrahima Bangoura (from (Turkey) Konyaspor)
23	DF	AZE	Shahriyar Khalilov (from (Azerbaijan) Turan Tovuz)
27	DF	ROU	Adrian Scarlatache (from (Romania) Dinamo București)
28	DF	ROU	Cosmin Frăsinescu (from (Romania) Gloria Bistriţa)
84	MF	SLE	Julius Wobay (from (Romania) Universitatea Craiova)

Out: Note: Flags indicate national team as defined under FIFA eligibility rules; some limited exceptions apply. Players may hold more than one non-FIFA nationality.

No.	Pos.	Nation	Player
8	MF	ROU	Constantin Arbănaş (to (Moldova) Sfîntul Gheorghe)
9	FW	ARG	Diego Ruíz (to (Romania) FCM Târgu Mureş)
10	FW	AZE	Khagani Mammadov (to (Azerbaijan) MOIK Baku)
11	FW	AZE	Asif Mammadov (to (Azerbaijan) Inter Baku)
12	FW	HON	Allan Lalín (to (Honduras) Real España)
17	MF	AZE	Ramazan Abbasov (to (Azerbaijan) Kapaz)
20	FW	AZE	Amid Huseynov (to (Azerbaijan) Ravan Baku)
21	DF	BUL	Radomir Todorov (to (Azerbaijan) Baku)
21	DF	ROU	Adrian Iordache (to (Romania) Mioveni)
22	DF	GEO	Davit Imedashvili
28	MF	BRA	Cristian (to (Brazil) Bragantino)
31	GK	LAT	Deniss Romanovs (to (Indonesia) Cenderawasih FC)

== Competitions ==
=== Azerbaijan Premier League ===
==== First round ====
===== Results =====
7 August 2010 1	Khazar Lankaran	1–0	Gabala	Lankaran City Stadium
20:00 AZST (UTC+5)	Beqiri 75'	Summary		Attendance: 9,000; Referee: Vusal Aliyev

15 August 2010 2	Simurq	0–2	Khazar Lankaran	Zaqatala City Stadium
18:00 AZST (UTC+5)		Summary	Allahverdiyev 6' Ruíz 48'	Attendance: 400; Referee: Rahim Hasanov

21 August 2010 3	Khazar Lankaran	0–0	Inter Baku	Lankaran City Stadium
20:00 AZST (UTC+5)		Summary		Attendance: 13,500; Referee: Fariz Yusifov

29 August 2010 4	AZAL	0–1	Khazar Lankaran	AZAL Stadium
20:00 AZST (UTC+5)		Summary	Beqiri 90+2'	Attendance: 2,500; Referee: Rovshan Ahmadov

12 September 2010 5	Khazar Lankaran	3–0	MOIK Baku	Lankaran City Stadium
17:00 AZST (UTC+5)	Diego Souza 10'; Parks 19', 25'	Summary	Häşimzadä (red card) 72'	Attendance: 1,000; Referee: Elvin Askerov

18 September 2010 6	FK Mughan	0–0	Khazar Lankaran	Salyany Olympic Stadium
17:00 AZST (UTC+5)		Summary		Attendance: 1,000; Referee: Anar Salmanov

25 September 2010 7	Khazar Lankaran	1–0	Neftchi Baku	Lankaran City Stadium
19:00 AZST (UTC+5)	Ruíz 89'	Summary		Attendance: 11,000; Referee: Vusal Aliyev

2 October 2010 8	Khazar Lankaran	1–1	Baku	Lankaran City Stadium
18:00 AZST (UTC+5)	Parks 23'	Summary	Jabá (red card) 74'; Javadov 85'	Attendance: 12,000; Referee: Fariz Yusifov

17 October 2010 9	Ganja	4–1	Khazar Lankaran	Ganja City Stadium
15:00 AZST (UTC+5)	Junivan 6'; Zargarov 38'; Allahquliyev 40', 90+2'	Summary	Doman 4'	Attendance: 17,500; Referee: Vusal Aliyev

23 October 2010 10	Khazar Lankaran	2–0	Turan Tovuz	Lankaran City Stadium
16:00 AZST (UTC+5)	Parks 7'; Doman 14'	Summary		Attendance: 5,000; Referee: Rauf Jabbarov

30 October 2010 11	Qarabağ	0–1	Khazar Lankaran	Guzanli Olympic Stadium
AZT (UTC+4)		Summary	Arbănaş 66'	Attendance: 2,000; Referee: Rovshan Ahmadov

6 November 2010 12	Gabala	1–0	Khazar Lankaran	Gabala City Stadium
14:00 AZT (UTC+4)	Baranin 35'	Report; Summary		Attendance: 2,500; Referee: Fariz Yusifov

13 November 2010 13	Khazar Lankaran	1–0	Simurq	Lankaran City Stadium
16:00 AZT (UTC+4)	Gurbanov 72'	Summary		Attendance: 7,500; Referee: Ramil Diniyev

21 November 2010 14	Khazar Lankaran	2–0	FK Mughan	Lankaran City Stadium
16:00 AZT (UTC+4)	Gurbanov 30', 67'	Summary		Attendance: 9,500; Referee: Rovshan Ahmadov

27 November 2010 15	Baku	1–1	Khazar Lankaran	Tofig Bahramov Stadium
16:10 AZT (UTC+4)	Jafarguliyev 56'	Summary	Parks 17'	Attendance: 2,000; Referee: Vusal Aliyev

4 December 2010 16	Turan Tovuz	1–2	Khazar Lankaran	Tovuz City Stadium
16:00 AZT (UTC+4)	Erdoğdu 39'	Summary	Lalín 37'; Stancu 70'	Attendance: 3,000; Referee: Fariz Yusifov

11 December 2010 17	Khazar Lankaran	1–0	Ganja	Lankaran City Stadium
16:00 AZT (UTC+4)	Lalín 75'	Summary		Attendance: 12,000; Referee: Elnur Muradov

18 December 2010 18	MOIK Baku	0–2	Khazar Lankaran	MOIK Stadium
17:00 AZT (UTC+4)		Summary	Beqiri 26', 39'	Attendance: 2,100; Referee: Rauf Jabbarov

23 December 2010 19	Khazar Lankaran	1–2	Qarabağ	Lankaran City Stadium
17:00 AZT (UTC+4)	Gurbanov 15'	Summary	Aliyev 4', 75'	Attendance: 11,000; Referee: Rovshan Ahmadov

13 February 2011 20	Neftchi Baku	0–0	Khazar Lankaran	Tofik Bakhramov Stadium
18:00 AZT (UTC+4)		Summary		Attendance: 10,000; Referee: Vusal Aliyev

20 February 2011 21	Khazar Lankaran	2–1	AZAL	Lankaran City Stadium
17:30 AZT (UTC+4)	Abdullayev 45'; Chiacu 78'	Summary	Nduka 57'	Attendance: 12,000; Referee: Fariz Yusifov

27 February 2011 22	Inter Baku	1–3	Khazar Lankaran	Shafa Stadium
AZT (UTC+4)	Karlsons 60' (pen.)	Summary	Chiacu 9'; Piţ 19'; Parks 49'	Attendance: 3,000; Referee: Rovshan Ahmadov

===== Table =====
Pos	Team	Pld	W	D	L	GF	GA	GD	Pts	Qualification
1	Neftçi Baku	22	14	6	2	40	9	+31	48	Qualification for championship group
2	Khazar Lankaran	22	14	5	3	28	12	+16	47	Qualification for championship group
3	Qarabağ	22	13	3	6	30	14	+16	42	Qualification for championship group
4	Inter Baku	22	12	4	6	24	16	+8	40	Qualification for championship group
5	AZAL	22	9	9	4	27	16	+11	36	Qualification for championship group

Source: Soccerway.com
Rules for classification: 1) points; 2) goal difference; 3) number of goals scored.

==== Championship group ====
===== Results =====
13 March 2011 23	AZAL	1–0	Khazar Lankaran	AZAL Stadium
14:00 AZT (UTC+4)	Krastovchev 76'	Summary		Attendance: 4,000; Referee: Rovshan Ahmadov

18 March 2011 24	Khazar Lankaran	1–1	Neftchi Baku	Lankaran City Stadium
18:00 AZT (UTC+4)	Wobay 89' (pen.)	Summary	Rodriguinho 23'	Attendance: 15,000; Referee: Fariz Yusifov

2 April 2011 25	Baku	0–0	Khazar Lankaran	Tofig Bahramov Stadium
18:00 AZST (UTC+5)		Summary		Attendance: 2,000; Referee: Ramil Diniyev

10 April 2011 26	Qarabağ	0–0	Khazar Lankaran	Guzanli Olympic Stadium
16:00 AZST (UTC+5)		Summary	Diego Souza (yellow card) 67' (yellow-red card) 90'	Attendance: 2,800; Referee: Fariz Yusifov

16 April 2011 27	Khazar Lankaran	1–1	Inter Baku	Lankaran City Stadium
19:00 AZST (UTC+5)	Parks 18'	Summary	Odikadze 28'	Attendance: 11,000; Referee: Rovshan Ahmadov

23 April 2011 28	Khazar Lankaran	3–0	AZAL	Lankaran City Stadium
18:30 AZST (UTC+5)	Opara 58'; Parks 76'; Abdullayev 79'	Summary		Attendance: 10,500; Referee: Vusal Aliyev

30 April 2011 29	Inter Baku	1–1	Khazar Lankaran	Shafa Stadium
18:00 AZST (UTC+5)	Dashdemirov 26'	Summary	Chiacu 62'	Attendance: 5,000; Referee: Ramil Diniyev

7 May 2011 30	Khazar Lankaran	1–1	Qarabağ	Lankaran City Stadium
20:00 AZST (UTC+5)	Opara 16'	Summary	Gurbanov 90+1'	Attendance: 11,000; Referee: Fariz Yusifov

13 May 2011 31	Khazar Lankaran	2–0	Baku	Lankaran City Stadium
18:30 AZST (UTC+5)	Scarlatache 67'; Opara 83'	Summary		Attendance: 12,000; Referee: Vusal Aliyev

18 May 2011 32	Neftchi Baku	1–1	Khazar Lankaran	Tofik Bakhramov Stadium
20:00 AZST (UTC+5)	Imamverdiyev 46'; Abdullayev (yellow card) 32' (yellow-red card) 53'	Summary	Wobay 47'	Attendance: 7,500; Referee: Ramil Diniyev

===== Table =====
Pos	Team	Pld	W	D	L	GF	GA	GD	Pts	Qualification
1	Neftçi Baku (C)	32	19	10	3	53	17	+36	67	Qualification for Champions League second qualifying round
2	Khazar Lankaran	32	16	12	4	38	18	+20	60	Qualification for Europa League second qualifying round (Note: Khazar Lankaran won the 2010–11 Azerbaijan Cup and therefore qualified for the second qualifying round of the 2011–12 UEFA Europa League.)
3	Qarabağ	32	17	7	8	41	22	+19	58	Qualification for Europa League first qualifying round
4	AZAL	32	13	10	9	36	28	+8	49	Qualification for Europa League first qualifying round
5	Inter Baku	32	13	10	9	29	24	+5	49	
6	Baku	32	10	10	12	33	32	+1	40	

Source: Soccerway.com
Rules for classification: 1) points; 2) goal difference; 3) number of goals scored.
(C) Champions

=== Azerbaijan Cup ===
8 December 2010 Last 16	Khazar Lankaran	3–1	MKT Araz	Lankaran City Stadium
AZT (UTC+4)	Lalín 10'; Huseynov 11'; Abbasov 42'	Summary	Aliyev 22'	Attendance: 5,000; Referee: Orkhan Mammadov

3 March 2011 Quarter Final 1st Leg	Neftchi Baku	3–4	Khazar Lankaran	Tofik Bakhramov Stadium
AZT (UTC+4)	Flavinho 32' (pen.), 63'; Georgievski 70'	Summary	Parks 12'; Scarlatache 36'; Wobay 45+2'; Mureşan 61'	Attendance: 5,000; Referee: Anar Salmanov

8 March 2011 Quarter Final 2nd Leg	Khazar Lankaran	1–1 (5–4 agg.)	Neftchi Baku	Lankaran City Stadium
18:00 AZT (UTC+4)	Parks 22'	Summary	Flavinho 9'	Attendance: 15,000; Referee: Vusal Aliyev

27 April 2011 Semi Final 1st Leg	Khazar Lankaran	1–0	Baku	Lankaran City Stadium
18:30 AZST (UTC+5)	Parks 23'	Summary		Attendance: 14,000; Referee: Fariz Yusifov

4 May 2011 Semi Final 2nd Leg	Baku	2–1(a) (2–2 agg.)	Khazar Lankaran	Tofik Bakhramov Stadium
18:00 AZST (UTC+5)	Leo Rocha 49'; Fábio 85' (pen.)	Summary	Amirguliev 57'	Attendance: 4,000; Referee: Rovshan Ahmadov

24 May 2011 Final	Inter Baku	1–1 (a.e.t.) (2–4 p)	Khazar Lankaran	Tofiq Bahramov Stadium, Baku
20:00 AZST (UTC+5)	Karlsons 100'	Summary	Parks 91'	Attendance: 10,000; Referee: Fariz Yusifov

=== UEFA Europa League ===
==== Qualifying rounds ====
1 July 2010 First qualifying round 1st leg	Olimpia (Moldova)	0–0	(Azerbaijan) Khazar Lankaran	Chișinău, Moldova^{6}
21:00 AZST (UTC+5)		Report		Stadium: Zimbru Stadium; Attendance: 5,800; Referee: Vadims Direktorenko (Latvia)

8 July 2010 First qualifying round 2nd Leg	Khazar Lankaran (Azerbaijan)	1–1 (a) (1–1 agg.)	(Moldova) Olimpia	Lankaran, Azerbaijan
21:00 AZST (UTC+5)	Lalín 78'	Report	Robens 14'	Stadium: Lankaran City Stadium; Attendance: 11,250; Referee: Vitaly Sevostyanik (Belarus)

Notes

- Note 6: Played in Chișinău at Zimbru Stadium as Olimpia's Olimpia Bălţi Stadium did not meet UEFA criteria.

== Squad statistics ==
=== Appearances and goals ===
No.	Pos	Nat	Player	Total		Premier League		Azerbaijan Cup		Europa League	
No.	Pos	Nat	Player	Apps	Goals	Apps	Goals	Apps	Goals	Apps	Goals
1	GK	(Azerbaijan) AZE	Kamran Agayev	36	0	29+0	0	5+0	0	2+0	0
2	DF	(Azerbaijan) AZE	Elnur Allahverdiyev	33	1	26+2	1	3+0	0	2+0	0
3	DF	(Albania) ALB	Elvin Beqiri	27	4	22+2	4	0+1	0	2+0	0
5	MF	(Brazil) BRA	Diego Souza	13	1	9+2	1	2+0	0	0+0	0
6	DF	(Portugal) POR	Bruno Simão	10	0	8+0	0	1+1	0	0+0	0
7	DF	(Azerbaijan) AZE	Ruslan Poladov	17	0	12+4	0	1+0	0	0+0	0
8	DF	(Romania) ROU	Nicolae Muşat	10	0	5+1	0	4+0	0	0+0	0
9	FW	(Romania) ROU	Alexandru Piţurcă	5	0	1+3	0	0+1	0	0+0	0
10	FW	(Azerbaijan) AZE	Elnur Abdullayev	15	2	9+2	2	3+1	0	0+0	0
11	MF	(Romania) ROU	Andrei Mureşan	17	1	10+2	0	5+0	1	0+0	0
12	GK	(Ukraine) UKR	Yevhen Kopyl	1	0	1+0	0	0+0	0	0+0	0
14	DF	(Azerbaijan) AZE	Rahid Amirguliev	38	1	28+2	0	5+1	1	2+0	0
15	FW	(Nigeria) NGR	Emeka Opara	22	3	10+6	3	2+2	0	2+0	0
16	MF	(Romania) ROU	Adrian Piţ	16	0	12+0	0	4+0	0	0+0	0
17	MF	(Romania) ROU	Hristu Chiacu	15	3	5+7	3	2+1	0	0+0	0
18	MF	(Azerbaijan) AZE	Alim Gurbanov	22	4	9+9	4	0+2	0	1+1	0
19	MF	(Guinea) GUI	Ibrahima Bangoura	5	0	3+2	0	0+0	0	0+0	0
23	DF	(Azerbaijan) AZE	Shahriyar Khalilov	1	0	0+1	0	0+0	0	0+0	0
27	DF	(Romania) ROU	Adrian Scarlatache	17	2	12+0	1	5+0	1	0+0	0
28	DF	(Romania) ROU	Cosmin Frăsinescu	6	0	4+0	0	2+0	0	0+0	0
30	MF	(Romania) ROU	Cătălin Doman	24	2	13+7	2	1+3	0	0+0	0
36	FW	(Costa Rica) CRC	Winston Parks	30	12	23+2	8	5+0	4	0+0	0
55	MF	(Azerbaijan) AZE	Tural Jalilov	4	0	0+3	0	0+1	0	0+0	0
77	DF	(Romania) ROU	Stelian Stancu	26	1	21+2	1	2+1	0	0+0	0
84	FW	(Sierra Leone) SLE	Julius Wobay	16	3	11+0	2	5+0	1	0+0	0
	MF	(Azerbaijan) AZE	Kazım Kazımlı	1	0	0+0	0	0+1	0	0+0	0
	FW	(Azerbaijan) AZE	Fikrat Ulduzlu	1	0	0+0	0	0+1	0	0+0	0
Players who appeared for Khazar Lankaran who left during the season:
8	MF	(Romania) ROU	Constantin Arbănaş	13	1	9+3	1	1+0	0	0+0	0
9	FW	(Azerbaijan) AZE	Zaur Ramazanov	2	0	0+0	0	0+0	0	1+1	0
9	FW	(Argentina) ARG	Diego Ruíz	8	2	5+3	2	0+0	0	0+0	0
10	FW	(Azerbaijan) AZE	Khagani Mammadov	9	0	4+3	0	0+0	0	0+2	0
11	FW	(Azerbaijan) AZE	Asif Mammadov	9	0	1+7	0	1+0	0	0+0	0
12	FW	(Honduras) HON	Allan Lalín	19	4	11+5	2	1+0	1	2+0	1
17	MF	(Azerbaijan) AZE	Ramazan Abbasov	6	1	0+5	0	1+0	1	0+0	0
20	FW	(Azerbaijan) AZE	Amid Huseynov	7	1	1+3	0	1+0	1	0+2	0
21	DF	(Bulgaria) BUL	Radomir Todorov	21	0	18+0	0	1+0	0	2+0	0
21	DF	(Romania) ROU	Adrian Iordache	16	0	15+0	0	1+0	0	0+0	0
22	DF	(Georgia (country)) GEO	Davit Imedashvili	4	0	1+0	0	1+0	0	2+0	0
28	MF	(Brazil) BRA	Cristian	8	0	2+6	0	0+0	0	0+0	0
30	MF	(Brazil) BRA	Mario Sergio	2	0	0+0	0	0+0	0	2+0	0
31	GK	(Latvia) LAT	Deniss Romanovs	5	0	3+1	0	1+0	0	0+0	0
72	MF	(Turkey) TUR	Devran Ayhan	2	0	0+0	0	0+0	0	2+0	0

=== Goal scorers ===
Place	Position	Nation	Number	Name	Premier League	Azerbaijan Cup	Europa League	Total
1	FW	(Costa Rica)	36	Winston Parks	8	4	0	12
2	MF	(Azerbaijan)	18	Alim Gurbanov	4	0	0	4
2	DF	(Albania)	3	Elvin Beqiri	4	0	0	4
2	FW	(Honduras)	12	Allan Lalín	2	1	1	4
5	MF	(Romania)	17	Hristu Chiacu	3	0	0	3
5	FW	(Nigeria)	15	Emeka Opara	3	0	0	3
5	FW	(Sierra Leone)	84	Julius Wobay	2	1	0	3
8	MF	(Azerbaijan)	10	Elnur Abdullayev	2	0	0	2
8	MF	(Romania)	30	Cătălin Doman	2	0	0	2
8	FW	(Argentina)	9	Diego Ruíz	2	0	0	2
8	DF	(Romania)	27	Adrian Scarlatache	1	1	0	2
12	DF	(Romania)	77	Stelian Stancu	1	0	0	1
12	MF	(Romania)	16	Adrian Piţ	1	0	0	1
12	MF	(Brazil)	5	Diego Souza	1	0	0	1
12	DF	(Azerbaijan)	2	Elnur Allahverdiyev	1	0	0	1
12	MF	(Romania)	8	Constantin Arbănaş	1	0	0	1
12	DF	(Azerbaijan)	14	Rahid Amirguliev	0	1	0	1
12	MF	(Romania)	11	Andrei Mureşan	0	1	0	1
12	MF	(Azerbaijan)	17	Ramazan Abbasov	0	1	0	1
12	FW	(Azerbaijan)	20	Amid Huseynov	0	1	0	1
				TOTALS	38	11	1	50

=== Disciplinary record ===
Number	Nation	Position	Name	Premier League		Azerbaijan Cup		Europa League		Total	
Number	Nation	Position	Name	Yellow card	Red card	Yellow card	Red card	Yellow card	Red card	Yellow card	Red card
1	(Azerbaijan)	GK	Kamran Agayev	2	0	1	0	0	0	3	0
2	(Azerbaijan)	DF	Elnur Allahverdiyev	3	0	1	0	1	0	5	0
3	(Albania)	DF	Elvin Beqiri	2	0	0	0	0	0	2	0
5	(Brazil)	MF	Diego Souza	3	1	0	0	0	0	3	1
8	(Romania)	DF	Nicolae Muşat	0	0	1	0	0	0	1	0
8	(Romania)	MF	Constantin Arbănaş	1	0	0	0	0	0	1	0
9	(Argentina)	FW	Diego Ruíz	2	0	0	0	0	0	2	0
9	(Romania)	FW	Alexandru Piţurcă	1	0	0	0	0	0	1	0
10	(Azerbaijan)	FW	Elnur Abdullayev	4	0	2	0	0	0	6	0
11	(Romania)	MF	Andrei Mureşan	2	0	1	0	0	0	3	0
12	(Honduras)	FW	Allan Lalín	2	0	0	0	0	0	2	0
14	(Azerbaijan)	DF	Rahid Amirguliev	4	0	0	0	1	0	5	0
15	(Nigeria)	FW	Emeka Opara	0	0	1	0	0	0	1	0
16	(Romania)	MF	Adrian Piţ	2	0	2	0	0	0	4	0
17	(Romania)	MF	Hristu Chiacu	3	0	0	0	0	0	3	0
18	(Azerbaijan)	MF	Alim Gurbanov	4	0	0	0	1	0	5	0
20	(Azerbaijan)	FW	Amid Huseynov	0	0	0	0	1	0	1	0
21	(Bulgaria)	DF	Radomir Todorov	3	0	1	0	0	0	4	0
21	(Romania)	DF	Adrian Iordache	1	0	0	0	0	0	1	0
22	(Georgia (country))	DF	Davit Imedashvili	0	0	0	0	2	0	2	0
27	(Romania)	DF	Cosmin Frăsinescu	2	0	2	0	0	0	4	0
28	(Brazil)	MF	Cristian	2	0	0	0	0	0	2	0
30	(Romania)	MF	Cătălin Doman	2	0	0	0	0	0	2	0
36	(Costa Rica)	FW	Winston Parks	6	0	1	0	0	0	7	0
77	(Azerbaijan)	DF	Stelian Stancu	5	0	1	0	0	0	6	0
84	(Sierra Leone)	FW	Julius Wobay	1	0	1	0	0	0	2	0
			TOTALS	57	1	15	0	6	0	78	1
