= 2011–12 FK Khazar Lankaran season =

Khazar Lankaran
2011-12 season
- President: (Azerbaijan) Mubariz Mansimov
- Manager: (Romania) Mircea Rednic until 4 December 2011 (Turkey) Cüneyt Biçer; 5 December 2011 – 15 March 2012 (Azerbaijan) Yunis Huseinov from 15 March 2012
- Stadium: Lankaran City Stadium
- Premier League: 2nd
- Azerbaijan Cup: Quarterfinals vs Inter Baku
- Europa League: Second Qualifying Roundvs vs Maccabi Tel Aviv
- Top goalscorer: League: Branimir Subašić (6); All: Branimir Subašić (7)
Home colours	Away colours

The Khazar Lankaran 2011–12 season was Khazar Lankaran's seventh Azerbaijan Premier League season. They finished second in the 2011–12 Azerbaijan Premier League, qualifying for the 2012–13 UEFA Europa League again. In the 2011–12 UEFA Europa League they entered, and were knocked out, at the Second Qualifying Round by Maccabi Tel Aviv of Israel. They also took part in the 2011–12 Azerbaijan Cup getting knocked out at the Quarterfinal stage by Inter Baku.

Khazar started the season under Mircea Rednic, but he was sacked and replaced the next day by Cüneyt Biçer. Biçer was then sacked on 15 March 2012 and replaced by Yunis Hüseynov.

== Squad ==
As of 10 February 2012

Note: Flags indicate national team as defined under FIFA eligibility rules; some limited exceptions apply. Players may hold more than one non-FIFA nationality.

No.	Pos.	Nation	Player
1	GK	AZE	Kamran Agayev
2	DF	AZE	Elnur Allahverdiyev
3	DF	ALB	Elvin Beqiri
4	MF	AZE	Akif Tagiyev
6	MF	CRO	Robert Alviž
7	MF	ROU	Cătălin Doman
8	MF	BRA	Éder Bonfim
9	FW	AZE	Branimir Subašić
10	MF	AZE	Elnur Abdullayev
11	MF	ROU	Andrei Mureşan
12	MF	MLI	Salif Ballo
14	DF	AZE	Rahid Amirguliev (captain)
15	MF	MLI	Sadio Tounkara

No.	Pos.	Nation	Player
16	MF	ROU	Adrian Piţ
17	DF	AZE	Zahid Guliyev
18	MF	AZE	Alim Gurbanov
21	DF	BUL	Radomir Todorov
22	MF	POR	António Semedo
23	DF	AZE	Shahriyar Khalilov
26	GK	AZE	Orkhan Sadigli
30	FW	CRC	Randall Brenes
33	DF	SRB	Stevan Bates (on loan from FK Rad)
38	MF	AZE	Gafar Aliyev
81	MF	BRA	Ricardo Vilana
85	GK	AZE	Kamal Bayramov

== Transfers ==
=== Summer ===
In: Note: Flags indicate national team as defined under FIFA eligibility rules; some limited exceptions apply. Players may hold more than one non-FIFA nationality.

No.	Pos.	Nation	Player
1	GK	AZE	Kamal Bayramov (from (Azerbaijan) Turan Tovuz)
8	DF	BRA	Éder Bonfim (from (Romania) Steaua)
9	FW	ROU	Csaba Borbély (from (Romania) Oțelul Galați)
9	FW	AZE	Branimir Subašić (from (Azerbaijan) FC Gabala)
17	DF	AZE	Zahid Guliyev (from (Azerbaijan) Absheron)
22	FW	POR	António Semedo (from (Cyprus) Alki Larnaca)
27	MF	AZE	Habil Nurəhmədov (from (Azerbaijan) Absheron)
32	MF	ESP	Mario Rosas (from (Spain) Salamanca)
33	FW	SLO	Dejan Rusič (from (Saudi Arabia) Al Taawon)
77	MF	ROU	Marius Onofraş (from (Romania) Steaua)
80	FW	POR	João Paulo Pinto Ribeiro (from (Cyprus) Olympiakos Nicosia)
81	MF	BRA	Ricardo Vilana (from (Romania) Steaua)

Out: Note: Flags indicate national team as defined under FIFA eligibility rules; some limited exceptions apply. Players may hold more than one non-FIFA nationality.

No.	Pos.	Nation	Player
5	MF	BRA	Diego Souza (to (Azerbaijan) Inter Baku)
6	DF	POR	Bruno Simão (to (Portugal) Portimonense)
7	DF	AZE	Ruslan Poladov (to (Azerbaijan) Inter Baku)
8	DF	ROU	Nicolae Muşat (loan return to (Romania) Dinamo București)
9	FW	ROU	Alexandru Piţurcă
9	FW	ROU	Csaba Borbély (to (Romania) CF Brăila)
12	GK	UKR	Yevhen Kopyl
17	MF	ROU	Hristu Chiacu (loan return to (Romania) Dinamo București)
19	MF	GUI	Ibrahima Bangoura (to (Mali) Djoliba AC)
27	DF	ROU	Adrian Scarlatache (loan return to (Romania) Dinamo București)
28	DF	ROU	Cosmin Frăsinescu (loan return to (Romania) Gloria Bistriţa)
36	FW	CRC	Winston Parks (loan return to (Romania) Politehnica Timișoara)
55	MF	AZE	Tural Jalilov (on loan to (Azerbaijan) Ravan Baku)
77	DF	ROU	Stelian Stancu (to (Romania) Sportul Studențesc București)
77	MF	ROU	Marius Onofraş (fto (Romania) CSMS Iaşi)
80	FW	POR	João Paulo Pinto Ribeiro (to (Cyprus) Apollon Limassol FC)
—	DF	BIH	Veldin Muharemović (to (Bosnia and Herzegovina) FK Sarajevo)
—	MF	AZE	Asif Mammadov (to (Azerbaijan) Inter Baku)
—	FW	AZE	Amid Huseynov (on loan to (Azerbaijan) Ravan Baku)
—	FW	HON	Allan Lalín (to (Honduras) Real España)

=== Winter ===
In: Note: Flags indicate national team as defined under FIFA eligibility rules; some limited exceptions apply. Players may hold more than one non-FIFA nationality.

No.	Pos.	Nation	Player
4	MF	AZE	Akif Taghiyev (from (Azerbaijan) Turan)
6	MF	CRO	Robert Alviž (from (Cyprus) Anagennisi Dherynia)
12	FW	MLI	Salif Ballo (from (Mali) AS Real Bamako)
15	MF	MLI	Sadio Tounkara (from (Mali) Jeanne d'Arc FC)
21	DF	BUL	Radomir Todorov (from (Bulgaria) Spartak Varna)
30	FW	CRC	Randall Brenes (from (Costa Rica) Cartaginés)
33	DF	SRB	Stevan Bates (on loan from (Serbia) FK Rad)
38	MF	AZE	Gafar Aliyev (from (Azerbaijan) Ravan Baku)
—	FW	MLI	Siriman Magassouba (from (Mali) AS Real Bamako)

Out: Note: Flags indicate national team as defined under FIFA eligibility rules; some limited exceptions apply. Players may hold more than one non-FIFA nationality.

No.	Pos.	Nation	Player
15	FW	NGR	Emeka Opara (to (Kuwait) Al Naser)
20	MF	AZE	Eldar Ismayilov
27	MF	AZE	Habil Nurəhmədov (to (Azerbaijan) AZAL)
32	MF	ESP	Mario Rosas (to (Spain) SD Huesca)
33	FW	SLO	Dejan Rusič (to (Saudi Arabia) Al-Taawon)
84	MF	SLE	Julius Wobay (to (Egypt) Al-Masry)
—	DF	EST	Tihhon Šišov (to (Estonia) JK Nõmme Kalju)

== Competitions ==
=== Azerbaijan Premier League ===
==== Results summary ====
Overall								Home						Away					
Pld	W	D	L	GF	GA	GD	Pts	W	D	L	GF	GA	GD	W	D	L	GF	GA	GD
22	13	5	4	33	19	+14	44	8	2	1	15	5	+10	5	3	3	18	14	+4

Last updated: 21 December 2011.
Source: Soccerway

==== Results by round ====
Round	1	2	3	4	5	6	7	8	9	10	11	12	13	14	15	16	17	18	19	20	21	22
Ground	H	A	H	A	H	A	H	A	H	A	H	A	H	A	H	H	A	H	H	A	A	A
Result	W	W	W	D	W	W	W	L	W	D	W	L	D	D	L	D	W	W	W	L	W	W
Position																				3	3	3

Source: Soccerway
A = Away; H = Home; W = Win; D = Draw; L = Loss

==== Results ====
6 August 2011 1	Khazar Lankaran	2 – 1	Sumgayit	Lankaran
20:00 AZST (UTC+5)	Opara 33'; Wobay 42'	Summary	Guliyev 84'	Stadium: Lankaran City Stadium; Attendance: 8,000; Referee: Rahim Häsänov

14 August 2011 2	AZAL	0 – 3	Khazar Lankaran	Baku
20:00 AZST (UTC+5)		Summary	Piţ 13'; Opara 61', 75'	Stadium: AZAL Stadium; Attendance: 2,800; Referee: Fariz Yusifov

20 August 2011 3	Khazar Lankaran	3 – 1	Turan	Lankaran
19:30 AZST (UTC+5)	Subašić 33', 58'; Ricardo 59'	Summary	Nabiyev 86'	Stadium: Lankaran City Stadium; Attendance: 8,000; Referee: Elchin Mämmädov

27 August 2011 4	Ravan Baku	1 – 1	Khazar Lankaran	Baku
20:00 AZST (UTC+5)	Igor Souza 35'	Summary	Doman 54'	Stadium: Dalga Arena; Attendance: 1,200; Referee: Rauf Jabbarov

10 September 2011 5	Khazar Lankaran	1 – 0	Neftchi Baku	Lankaran
20:00 AZST (UTC+5)	Abishov 41' (og.)	Summary		Stadium: Lankaran City Stadium; Attendance: 14,000; Referee: Ramil Diniyev

17 September 2011 6	Qarabağ	0 – 1	Khazar Lankaran	Quzanlı
16:00 AZST (UTC+5)		Summary	Piţ 12'; Allahverdiyev (yellow card) 44' (yellow-red card) 63'	Stadium: Guzanli Olympic Stadium; Attendance: 2,000; Referee: Fariz Yusifov

23 September 2011 7	Khazar Lankaran	2 – 1	Gabala	Lankaran
18:30 AZST (UTC+5)	Semedo 40'; Abdullayev 64'	Summary	Baranin 68'	Stadium: Lankaran City Stadium; Attendance: 11,000; Referee: Ramil Diniyev

30 September 2011 8	Inter	1 – 0	Khazar Lankaran	Baku
19:00 AZST (UTC+5)	Hajiyev 72'	Summary		Stadium: Shafa Stadium; Attendance: 5,200; Referee: Aliyar Ağayev

16 October 2011 9	Khazar Lankaran	1 – 0	Simurq	Lankaran
17:30 AZST (UTC+5)	Semedo 27'	Summary		Stadium: Lankaran City Stadium; Attendance: 5,000; Referee: Rauf Jabbarov

21 October 2011 10	Baku	2 – 2	Khazar Lankaran	Baku
15:00 AZST (UTC+5)	Parks 62', 69'; Maharramov (yellow card) 40' (yellow-red card) 73'	Summary	Bonfim 25'; Rusic 77'; Gurbanov (yellow card) 86' (yellow-red card) 90+3'	Stadium: Tofig Bahramov Stadium; Attendance: 1,000; Referee: Fariz Yusifov

28 October 2011 11	Khazar Lankaran	1 – 0	Kəpəz	Lankaran
18:00 AZST (UTC+5)	Rusic 34'	Summary		Stadium: Lankaran City Stadium; Attendance: 4,500; Referee: Rahim Häsänov

6 November 2011 12	Neftchi Baku	5 – 0	Khazar Lankaran	Baku
18:00 AZT (UTC+4)	Flavinho 19', 33'; Nasimov 68', 80'; Guliev 90'	Summary		Stadium: Ismat Gayibov Stadium; Attendance: 2,500; Referee: Elnur Muradov

19 November 2011 13	Khazar Lankaran	1 – 1	Ravan Baku	Lankaran
16:30 AZT (UTC+4)	Amirguliev 88'	Summary	Torres 90'	Stadium: Lankaran City Stadium; Attendance: 6,000; Referee: Rahim Häsänov

25 November 2011 14	Simurq	2 – 2	Khazar Lankaran	Zaqatala
16:30 AZT (UTC+4)	Poškus 66'; Ramaldanov 82'	Summary	Doman 21'; Semedo 42'; Doman (yellow card) 39' (yellow-red card) 80'	Stadium: Zaqatala City Stadium; Attendance: 1,000; Referee: Fariz Yusifov

4 December 2011 15	Khazar Lankaran	0 – 1	Inter	Lankaran
16:00 AZT (UTC+4)		Summary	Tskhadadze 78'	Stadium: Lankaran City Stadium; Attendance: 7,500; Referee: Vusal Äliyev

10 December 2011 16	Khazar Lankaran	0 – 0	Qarabağ	Lankaran
16:00 AZT (UTC+4)		Summary		Stadium: Lankaran City Stadium; Attendance: 0 Referee: Elchin Mämmädov

16 December 2011 17	Kəpəz	1 – 4	Khazar Lankaran	Ganja
14:00 AZT (UTC+4)	Parkhachev 7'; Antic (red card) 42'	Summary	Rusic 1'; Subašić 43'; Wobay 65'; Guliyev 90+1'	Stadium: Ganja City Stadium; Attendance: 8,000; Referee: Aliyar Ağayev

21 December 2011 18	Khazar Lankaran	3 – 0	Baku	Lankaran
16:00 AZT (UTC+4)	Subašić 29' (pen.); Wobay 45+1'; Amirguliev 54'	Summary		Stadium: Lankaran City Stadium; Attendance: 0 Referee: Fariz Yusifov

15 February 2012 19	Khazar Lankaran	1 – 0	AZAL	Lankaran
16:00 AZT (UTC+4)	Amirguliev 74'	Summary		Stadium: Lankaran City Stadium; Attendance: 6,500; Referee: Fariz Yusifov

20 February 2012 20	Gabala	2 – 1	Khazar Lankaran	Qabala
14:00 AZT (UTC+4)	Chertoganov 41'; Burton 90+2'	Summary	Amirguliev 26'	Stadium: Gabala City Stadium; Attendance: 1,000; Referee: Elchin Mämmädov

2 March 2012 21	Sumgayit	0 – 3	Khazar Lankaran	Sumgayit
14:00 AZT (UTC+4)		Summary	Bonfim 27'; Mureşan 40'; Doman 69'	Stadium: Mehdi Huseynzade Stadium; Attendance: 1,000; Referee: Aliyar Ağayev

7 March 2012 22	Turan	0 – 1	Khazar Lankaran	Tovuz
14:00 AZT (UTC+4)		Summary	Abbasov 3' (o.g.)	Stadium: Tovuz City Stadium; Attendance: 4,500; Referee: Anar Salmanov

==== Table ====
Pos	Team	Pld	W	D	L	GF	GA	GD	Pts	Qualification
1	Neftçi Baku	22	16	1	5	45	17	+28	49	Qualification for championship group
2	Inter Baku	22	13	6	3	21	10	+11	45	Qualification for championship group
3	Khazar Lankaran	22	13	5	4	33	19	+14	44	Qualification for championship group
4	Qarabağ	22	12	5	5	27	14	+13	41	Qualification for championship group
5	Baku	22	10	5	7	27	22	+5	35	Qualification for championship group

Source: Soccerway: Azerbaijan Premier League Table
Rules for classification: 1) points; 2) goal difference; 3) number of goals scored.

=== Azerbaijan Premier League Championship Group ===
==== Results ====
11 March 2012 23	Qarabağ	1 – 0	Khazar Lankaran	Quzanlı
15:00 AZT (UTC+4)	Adamia 69'	Summary		Stadium: Guzanli Olympic Stadium; Attendance: 3,000; Referee: Elchin Mämmädov

19 March 2012 24	Khazar Lankaran	0 – 1	Baku	Lankaran
17:00 AZT (UTC+4)		Summary	Česnauskis 39'	Stadium: Lankaran City Stadium; Attendance: 9,000; Referee: Anar Salmanov

24 March 2012 25	Neftchi	1 – 1	Khazar Lankaran	Baku
15:00 AZT (UTC+4)	Abishov 26'	Summary	Amirguliev 55'	Stadium: Ismat Gayibov Stadium; Attendance: 4,500; Referee: Aliyar Ağayev

1 April 2012 26	Khazar Lankaran	2 – 0	Inter Baku	Lankaran
18:00 AZST (UTC+5)	Doman 42'; Bates (yellow card) 24' (yellow-red card) 74'; Bonfim 90+2'	Summary	Guliyev (yellow card) 11' (yellow-red card) 41'; Abramidze (yellow card) 28' (red card) 85'	Stadium: Lankaran City Stadium; Attendance: 10,000; Referee: Elchin Mämmädov

6 April 2012 27	Gabala	0 – 1	Khazar Lankaran	Qabala
16:00 AZST (UTC+5)		Summary	Subašić 3'	Stadium: Gabala City Stadium; Attendance: 2,500; Referee: Anar Salmanov

14 April 2012 28	Baku	4 – 1	Khazar Lankaran	Baku
15:00 AZST (UTC+5)	Česnauskis 34', 41', 57'; Šolić 69'	Summary	Subašić 63'; Doman (red card) 77'	Stadium: Tofig Bakhramov Stadium; Attendance: 500; Referee: Vusal Äliyev

22 April 2012 29	Khazar Lankaran	1 – 0	Neftchi	Lankaran
18:00 AZST (UTC+5)	Ricardo 52'	Summary		Stadium: Lankaran City Stadium; Attendance: 1,200; Referee: Elchin Mämmädov

29 April 2012 30	Inter Baku	0 – 0	Khazar Lankaran	Baku
19:00 AZST (UTC+5)		Summary		Stadium: Shafa Stadium; Attendance: 3,000; Referee: Aliyar Ağayev

5 May 2012 31	Khazar Lankaran	1 – 1	Gabala	Lankaran
17:30 AZST (UTC+5)	Piţ 59'	Summary	Mendy 87'	Stadium: Lankaran City Stadium; Attendance: 8,000; Referee: Rahim Häsänov

11 May 2012 32	Khazar Lankaran	4 – 1	Qarabağ	Lankaran
17:30 AZST (UTC+5)	Tounkara 11'; Brenes 22'; Bonfim 32', 66'; Beqiri (yellow card) 36' (yellow-red card) 67'	Summary	Aliyev 67' (pen.)	Stadium: Lankaran City Stadium; Attendance: 13,500; Referee: Elchin Mämmädov

==== Table ====
Pos	Team	Pld	W	D	L	GF	GA	GD	Pts	Qualification or relegation
1	Neftçi Baku (C)	32	20	3	9	55	30	+25	63	Qualification for Champions League second qualifying round
2	Khazar Lankaran	32	17	8	7	44	28	+16	59	Qualification for Europa League first qualifying round (Note: Baku qualified for the first qualifiying round of the 2012–13 UEFA Europa League as winner of the 2011–12 Azerbaijan Cup.)
3	Inter Baku	32	16	8	8	29	21	+8	56	Qualification for Europa League first qualifying round
4	Qarabağ	32	15	8	9	37	28	+9	53	
5	Gabala	32	15	7	10	43	32	+11	52	
6	Baku	32	15	5	12	42	37	+5	50	Qualification for Europa League first qualifying round

Source: Soccerway.com
Rules for classification: 1) points; 2) goal difference; 3) number of goals scored.
(C) Champions

=== Azerbaijan Cup ===
30 November 2011 Last 16	Khazar Lankaran	3 – 0	Qaradağ	Lankaran
13:00 AZT (UTC+4)	Doman 25', 90'; Subašić 31'	Summary		Stadium: Lankaran City Stadium; Attendance: 200; Referee: Elvin Askerov

14 March 2012 Quarterfinals 1st Leg	Inter Baku	3 – 2	Khazar Lankaran	Baku
16:00 AZT (UTC+4)	Hajiyev 41'; Krastovchev 78'; Karlsons 87' (pen.)	Summary	Abdullayev 46'; Brenes 57'	Stadium: Shafa Stadium; Attendance: 2,000; Referee: Aliyar Ağayev

28 March 2012 Quarterfinals 2nd Leg	Khazar Lankaran	1 – 1 (2 – 3 agg.)	Inter Baku	Lankaran
18:00 AZT (UTC+4)	Brenes 76'	Summary	Tskhadadze 30'	Stadium: Lankaran City Stadium; Attendance: 8,000; Referee: Fariz Yusifov

=== UEFA Europa League ===
==== Qualifying phase ====
14 July 2011 2nd qualifying round 1st leg	Maccabi Tel Aviv (Israel)	3 – 1	(Azerbaijan) Khazar Lankaran	Tel Aviv
21:30 AZT (UTC+4)	Konaté 22'; Atar 39'; Israilevich 44'	Report	Mureşan 45+1'	Stadium: Bloomfield Stadium; Attendance: 8,352; Referee: Ilias Spathas (Greece)

21 July 2011 2nd qualifying round 2nd leg	Khazar Lankaran (Azerbaijan)	0 – 0 (1 – 3 agg.)	(Israel) Maccabi Tel Aviv	Lankaran
19:30 AZT (UTC+4)		Report		Stadium: Lankaran City Stadium; Attendance: 15,000; Referee: Andriy Shandor (Ukraine)

== Squad statistics ==
=== Appearances and goals ===
As of 14 May 2012

No.	Pos	Nat	Player	Total		Premier League		Azerbaijan Cup		Europa League	
No.	Pos	Nat	Player	Apps	Goals	Apps	Goals	Apps	Goals	Apps	Goals
1	GK	(Azerbaijan) AZE	Kamran Agayev	30	0	26+0	0	2+0	0	2+0	0
2	DF	(Azerbaijan) AZE	Elnur Allahverdiyev	27	1	24+0	1	2+0	0	1+0	0
3	DF	(Albania) ALB	Elvin Beqiri	24	0	21+1	0	1+0	0	1+0	0
6	MF	(Croatia) CRO	Robert Alviž	15	0	12+1	0	1+1	0	0+0	0
7	MF	(Romania) ROU	Cătălin Doman	29	6	21+3	4	1+2	2	1+1	0
8	MF	(Brazil) BRA	Éder Bonfim	36	5	31+0	5	2+1	0	2+0	0
9	FW	(Azerbaijan) AZE	Branimir Subašić	30	7	23+4	6	2+1	1	0+0	0
10	MF	(Azerbaijan) AZE	Elnur Abdullayev	28	1	18+8	0	1+1	1	0+0	0
11	MF	(Romania) ROU	Andrei Mureşan	34	2	26+3	1	3+0	0	2+0	1
12	MF	(Mali) MLI	Salif Ballo	1	0	0+1	0	0+0	0	0+0	0
14	DF	(Azerbaijan) AZE	Rahid Amirguliev	36	5	31+0	5	2+1	0	2+0	0
15	MF	(Mali) MLI	Sadio Tounkara	12	1	7+4	1	1+0	0	0+0	0
16	MF	(Romania) ROU	Adrian Piţ	35	2	30+0	2	3+0	0	2+0	0
17	DF	(Azerbaijan) AZE	Zahid Guliyev	5	1	2+2	1	1+0	0	0+0	0
18	MF	(Azerbaijan) AZE	Alim Qurbanov	10	0	0+9	0	0+1	0	0+0	0
21	DF	(Bulgaria) BUL	Radomir Todorov	12	0	11+0	0	1+0	0	0+0	0
22	MF	(Portugal) POR	António Semedo	10	3	1+7	3	2+0	0	0+0	0
23	DF	(Azerbaijan) AZE	Shahriyar Khalilov	15	0	6+8	0	1+0	0	0+0	0
26	GK	(Azerbaijan) AZE	Orkhan Sadigli	1	0	0+1	0	0+0	0	0+0	0
30	FW	(Costa Rica) CRC	Randall Brenes	13	3	5+6	1	2+0	2	0+0	0
33	DF	(Serbia) SRB	Stevan Bates	6	0	3+2	0	1+0	0	0+0	0
81	MF	(Brazil) BRA	Ricardo Vilana	19	1	12+3	1	2+0	0	2+0	0
85	GK	(Azerbaijan) AZE	Kamal Bayramov	7	0	6+0	0	1+0	0	0+0	0
--	FW	(Azerbaijan) AZE	Fikrat Ulduzlu	2	0	1+1	0	0+0	0	0+0	0
Players who appeared for Khazar no longer at the club:
5	MF	(Brazil) BRA	Diego Souza	1	0	0+0	0	0+0	0	0+1	0
9	FW	(Romania) ROU	Csaba Borbély	2	0	0+0	0	0+0	0	2+0	0
15	FW	(Nigeria) NGR	Emeka Opara	14	3	8+4	3	0+0	0	1+1	0
20	MF	(Azerbaijan) AZE	Eldar Ismayilov	1	3	1+0	3	0+0	0	0+0	0
27	MF	(Azerbaijan) AZE	Habil Nurəhmədov	2	0	0+1	0	0+1	0	0+0	0
32	MF	(Spain) ESP	Mario Rosas	11	0	6+4	0	1+0	0	0+0	0
33	FW	(Slovenia) SLO	Dejan Rusič	15	3	7+8	3	0+0	0	0+0	0
77	MF	(Romania) ROU	Marius Onofraş	2	0	0+0	0	0+0	0	2+0	0
80	MF	(Portugal) POR	João Paulo Pinto Ribeiro	1	0	0+0	0	0+0	0	1+0	0
84	MF	(Sierra Leone) SLE	Julius Wobay	10	3	7+1	3	0+0	0	1+1	0

=== Goal scorers ===
Place	Position	Nation	Number	Name	Premier League	Azerbaijan Cup	Europa League	Total
1	FW	(Azerbaijan)	9	Branimir Subašić	6	1	0	7
2	MF	(Romania)	30	Cătălin Doman	4	2	0	6
3	DF	(Azerbaijan)	14	Rahid Amirguliev	5	0	0	5
3	MF	(Brazil)	8	Éder Bonfim	5	0	0	5
5	FW	(Nigeria)	15	Emeka Opara	3	0	0	3
5	MF	(Sierra Leone)	84	Julius Wobay	3	0	0	3
5	MF	(Portugal)	22	António Semedo	3	0	0	3
5	FW	(Slovenia)	33	Dejan Rusic	3	0	0	3
5	MF	(Romania)	16	Adrian Piţ	3	0	0	3
5	FW	(Costa Rica)	30	Randall Brenes	1	2	0	3
11				Own goal	2	0	0	2
11	MF	(Brazil)	81	Ricardo Vilana	2	0	0	2
11	MF	(Romania)	11	Andrei Mureşan	1	0	1	2
14	DF	(Azerbaijan)	17	Zahid Guliyev	1	0	0	1
14	MF	(Mali)	15	Sadio Tounkara	1	0	0	1
14	DF	(Azerbaijan)	2	Elnur Allahverdiyev	1	0	0	1
14	MF	(Azerbaijan)	10	Elnur Abdullayev	0	1	0	1
				TOTALS	44	6	1	51

=== Disciplinary record ===
Number	Nation	Position	Name	Premier League		Azerbaijan Cup		Europa League		Total	
Number	Nation	Position	Name	Yellow card	Red card	Yellow card	Red card	Yellow card	Red card	Yellow card	Red card
1	(Azerbaijan)	GK	Kamal Bayramov	0	0	0	0	1	0	1	0
2	(Azerbaijan)	DF	Elnur Allahverdiyev	12	1	0	0	0	0	12	1
3	(Albania)	DF	Elvin Beqiri	2	1	0	0	0	0	2	1
6	(Croatia)	MF	Robert Alviž	3	0	1	0	0	0	4	0
7	(Romania)	MF	Cătălin Doman	8	2	1	0	1	0	10	2
8	(Brazil)	MF	Éder Bonfim	6	0	1	0	1	0	8	0
10	(Azerbaijan)	MF	Elnur Abdullayev	2	0	0	0	0	0	2	0
11	(Romania)	MF	Andrei Mureşan	7	0	0	0	0	0	7	0
14	(Azerbaijan)	DF	Rahid Amirguliev	4	0	0	0	0	0	4	0
15	(Nigeria)	FW	Emeka Opara	1	0	0	0	0	0	1	0
16	(Romania)	MF	Adrian Piţ	10	0	0	0	0	0	10	0
17	(Azerbaijan)	DF	Zahid Guliyev	1	0	1	0	0	0	2	0
18	(Azerbaijan)	MF	Alim Gurbanov	3	1	0	0	0	0	3	1
22	(Portugal)	MF	António Semedo	2	0	0	0	0	0	2	0
27	(Azerbaijan)	MF	Habil Nurəhmədov	0	0	1	0	0	0	1	0
30	(Costa Rica)	FW	Randall Brenes	2	0	0	0	0	0	2	0
32	(Spain)	MF	Mario Rosas	1	0	1	0	0	0	2	0
33	(Serbia)	DF	Stevan Bates	4	1	0	0	0	0	4	1
81	(Brazil)	MF	Ricardo Vilana	6	0	0	0	1	0	7	0
84	(Sierra Leone)	MF	Julius Wobay	0	0	0	0	1	0	1	0
85	(Azerbaijan)	GK	Kamal Bayramov	2	0	0	0	0	0	2	0
			TOTALS	69	5	5	0	5	0	79	5

=== Monthly awards ===
Month	Azerbaijan Professional Football League Awards	
Month	Player	Award
May	(Brazil) Eder Bonfim	Won

=== Annual awards ===
Award	PFL Seasonal Awards	
Award	Player	Award
Best Goalkeeper	(Azerbaijan) Kamran Agayev	Won
Best Defender	(Azerbaijan) Ruslan Abishov	Won
Best Midfielder	(Romania) Adrian Piț	Won

== Team kit ==
These are the 2011–12 Khazar Lankaran kits.

Supplier: Puma
Sponsor(s): Palmali

Home	Away
