= List of Azerbaijan football transfers winter 2011 =

This is a list of Azerbaijan football transfers in the winter transfer window 2011 by club. Only clubs of the 2010–11 Azerbaijan Premier League are included.

== Azerbaijan Premier League 2010-11 ==
=== AZAL Baku ===
In: Note: Flags indicate national team as defined under FIFA eligibility rules; some limited exceptions apply. Players may hold more than one non-FIFA nationality.

No.	Pos.	Nation	Player
16	MF	KOS	Mensur Limani (from (Albania) Vllaznia Shkodër)
20	FW	BLR	Gennadi Bliznyuk (from (Belarus) Belshina Bobruisk)
24	FW	BUL	Enyo Krastovchev (from (Bulgaria) Levski Sofia)

Out: Note: Flags indicate national team as defined under FIFA eligibility rules; some limited exceptions apply. Players may hold more than one non-FIFA nationality.

No.	Pos.	Nation	Player
6	DF	NGR	Abiodun Lawal (released)
16	FW	AZE	Samir Abdulov (to (Azerbaijan) FK Ganja)
17	MF	AZE	Huseyn Akhundov (loan to (Azerbaijan) FK Mughan)
20	DF	LTU	Marius Kazlauskas (to (Lithuania) Banga Gargždai)

=== Baku ===
In: Note: Flags indicate national team as defined under FIFA eligibility rules; some limited exceptions apply. Players may hold more than one non-FIFA nationality.

No.	Pos.	Nation	Player
3	DF	AZE	Rafael Amirbekov (from (Azerbaijan) FK Ganja)
18	DF	BUL	Radomir Todorov (From (Azerbaijan) Khazar Lankaran)
33	DF	SRB	Stevan Bates (from (Norway) Tromsø IL)
39	MF	UKR	Ruslan Levyha (From (Kazakhstan) FC Tobol)

Out: Note: Flags indicate national team as defined under FIFA eligibility rules; some limited exceptions apply. Players may hold more than one non-FIFA nationality.

No.	Pos.	Nation	Player
2	FW	BIH	Saša Kajkut (to (Bosnia and Herzegovina) Borac Banja Luka)
6	DF	TOG	Daré Nibombé (to (Germany) Arminia Bielefeld)
10	FW	CMR	Joël Epalle (to (Greece) Iraklis)
25	MF	COL	Jefferson Angulo (to (Colombia) Millonarios)

=== Gabala ===
In: Note: Flags indicate national team as defined under FIFA eligibility rules; some limited exceptions apply. Players may hold more than one non-FIFA nationality.

No.	Pos.	Nation	Player
11	FW	NED	Collins John (From (United States) Chicago Fire)
21	MF	SLE	Al Bangura (From (Turkey) Mersin İdmanyurdu)
25	MF	AZE	Nuran Gurbanov (From (Azerbaijan) MOIK Baku)

Out: Note: Flags indicate national team as defined under FIFA eligibility rules; some limited exceptions apply. Players may hold more than one non-FIFA nationality.

No.	Pos.	Nation	Player
22	MF	AZE	Parvin Pashayev (to (Azerbaijan) Mughan)
25	FW	AZE	Rahman Musayev (to (Azerbaijan) Qaradağ)

=== Ganja ===
In: Note: Flags indicate national team as defined under FIFA eligibility rules; some limited exceptions apply. Players may hold more than one non-FIFA nationality.

No.	Pos.	Nation	Player
—	MF	AZE	Ramazan Abbasov (From (Azerbaijan) Khazar Lankaran)
—	FW	AZE	Samir Abdulov (from (Azerbaijan) AZAL)

Out: Note: Flags indicate national team as defined under FIFA eligibility rules; some limited exceptions apply. Players may hold more than one non-FIFA nationality.

No.	Pos.	Nation	Player
—	DF	AZE	Rafael Amirbekov (to (Azerbaijan) Baku)

=== Inter Baku ===
In: Note: Flags indicate national team as defined under FIFA eligibility rules; some limited exceptions apply. Players may hold more than one non-FIFA nationality.

No.	Pos.	Nation	Player
11	FW	AZE	Asif Mammadov (From (Azerbaijan) Khazar Lankaran)
28	FW	GEO	Bachana Tskhadadze (From (Georgia (country)) Spartaki-Tskhinvali Tbilisi)

Out: Note: Flags indicate national team as defined under FIFA eligibility rules; some limited exceptions apply. Players may hold more than one non-FIFA nationality.

No.	Pos.	Nation	Player
10	MF	AZE	Jamal Mammadov (to (Azerbaijan) Simurq)
35	MF	BRA	Mario Sergio (to (Azerbaijan) Simurq)
84	DF	BRA	Filipe Machado (to (United Arab Emirates) Al Dhafra Club)

=== Khazar Lankaran ===
In: Note: Flags indicate national team as defined under FIFA eligibility rules; some limited exceptions apply. Players may hold more than one non-FIFA nationality.

No.	Pos.	Nation	Player
6	DF	POR	Bruno Simão (from (Romania) Astra Ploieşti)
8	DF	ROU	Nicolae Muşat (Loan from (Romania) Dinamo București)
9	FW	ROU	Alexandru Piţurcă (from (Romania) Universitatea Craiova)
10	MF	AZE	Elnur Abdullayev (from (Azerbaijan) FK Mughan)
11	MF	ROU	Andrei Mureșan (from (Romania) Gloria Bistriţa)
12	GK	UKR	Yevhen Kopyl (from (Ukraine) Zorya Luhansk)
16	MF	ROU	Adrian Piţ (from (Romania) Universitatea Cluj)
17	MF	ROU	Hristu Chiacu (Loan from (Romania) Dinamo București)
19	MF	GUI	Ibrahima Bangoura (from (Turkey) Konyaspor)
23	DF	AZE	Shahriyar Khalilov (from (Azerbaijan) Turan Tovuz)
27	DF	ROU	Adrian Scarlatache (from (Romania) Dinamo București)
28	DF	ROU	Cosmin Frăsinescu (from (Romania) Gloria Bistriţa)
84	MF	SLE	Julius Wobay (from (Romania) Universitatea Craiova)

Out: Note: Flags indicate national team as defined under FIFA eligibility rules; some limited exceptions apply. Players may hold more than one non-FIFA nationality.

No.	Pos.	Nation	Player
8	MF	ROU	Constantin Arbănaş (to (Moldova) Sfîntul Gheorghe)
9	FW	ARG	Diego Ruíz (to (Romania) FCM Târgu Mureş)
10	FW	AZE	Khagani Mammadov (to (Azerbaijan) MOIK Baku)
11	FW	AZE	Asif Mammadov (to (Azerbaijan) Inter Baku)
12	FW	HON	Allan Lalín (to (Honduras) Real España)
17	MF	AZE	Ramazan Abbasov (to (Azerbaijan) Kapaz)
20	FW	AZE	Amid Huseynov (to (Azerbaijan) Ravan Baku)
21	DF	BUL	Radomir Todorov (to (Azerbaijan) Baku)
21	DF	ROU	Adrian Iordache (to (Romania) Mioveni)
22	DF	GEO	Davit Imedashvili
28	MF	BRA	Cristian (to (Brazil) Bragantino)
31	GK	LAT	Deniss Romanovs (to (Indonesia) Cenderawasih FC)

=== FK Mughan ===
In: Note: Flags indicate national team as defined under FIFA eligibility rules; some limited exceptions apply. Players may hold more than one non-FIFA nationality.

No.	Pos.	Nation	Player
—	MF	AZE	Huseyn Akhundov (loan from (Azerbaijan) AZAL)

Out: Note: Flags indicate national team as defined under FIFA eligibility rules; some limited exceptions apply. Players may hold more than one non-FIFA nationality.

No.	Pos.	Nation	Player

=== MOIK Baku ===
In: Note: Flags indicate national team as defined under FIFA eligibility rules; some limited exceptions apply. Players may hold more than one non-FIFA nationality.

No.	Pos.	Nation	Player
—	FW	AZE	Khagani Mammadov (from (Azerbaijan) Khazar Lankaran)

Out: Note: Flags indicate national team as defined under FIFA eligibility rules; some limited exceptions apply. Players may hold more than one non-FIFA nationality.

No.	Pos.	Nation	Player

=== Neftchi Baku ===
In: Note: Flags indicate national team as defined under FIFA eligibility rules; some limited exceptions apply. Players may hold more than one non-FIFA nationality.

No.	Pos.	Nation	Player
4	MF	ALG	Yacine Hima (from (Belgium) Eupen)
7	MF	BRA	Rodriguinho (from (Brazil) Santos)

Out: Note: Flags indicate national team as defined under FIFA eligibility rules; some limited exceptions apply. Players may hold more than one non-FIFA nationality.

No.	Pos.	Nation	Player
7	MF	AZE	Farid Guliev (loan to (Azerbaijan) Simurq)
24	GK	LTU	Paulius Grybauskas (from (Poland) Wigry Suwałki)
30	MF	GEO	Vladimir Burduli
—	MF	ROU	Leonard Naidin (to (Romania) Mioveni)

=== Qarabağ ===
In: Note: Flags indicate national team as defined under FIFA eligibility rules; some limited exceptions apply. Players may hold more than one non-FIFA nationality.

No.	Pos.	Nation	Player
14	DF	AZE	Rashad Sadygov (from (Turkey) Eskişehirspor).
18	MF	AZE	Ilgar Gurbanov (from (Turkey) Mersin İdmanyurdu)
20	MF	MKD	Nderim Nexhipi (from (Belgium) Lierse S.K.)
99	MF	SRB	Bojan Pavlović (from (Serbia) Red Star Belgrade)

Out: Note: Flags indicate national team as defined under FIFA eligibility rules; some limited exceptions apply. Players may hold more than one non-FIFA nationality.

No.	Pos.	Nation	Player

=== Simurq ===
In: Note: Flags indicate national team as defined under FIFA eligibility rules; some limited exceptions apply. Players may hold more than one non-FIFA nationality.

No.	Pos.	Nation	Player
—	MF	AZE	Jamal Mammadov (From (Azerbaijan) Inter Baku)
—	MF	BRA	Mario Sergio (From (Azerbaijan) Inter Baku)
—	MF	AZE	Farid Guliev (loan from (Azerbaijan) Neftchi Baku)

Out: Note: Flags indicate national team as defined under FIFA eligibility rules; some limited exceptions apply. Players may hold more than one non-FIFA nationality.

No.	Pos.	Nation	Player

=== Turan ===
In: Note: Flags indicate national team as defined under FIFA eligibility rules; some limited exceptions apply. Players may hold more than one non-FIFA nationality.

No.	Pos.	Nation	Player

Out: Note: Flags indicate national team as defined under FIFA eligibility rules; some limited exceptions apply. Players may hold more than one non-FIFA nationality.

No.	Pos.	Nation	Player
