= Winston Park =

Winston Park may refer to:

- Winston Park, KwaZulu-Natal, a residential area in South Africa
- Winston Park, New Jersey, United States, an unincorporated community
- Winston Parks, a footballer from Costa Rica
