= Qurbanov =

Qurbanov is a surname. Notable people with the surname include:

- Alim Qurbanov (born 1977), Azerbaijani footballer
- Mahmud Qurbanov (born 1973), Azerbaijani footballer
