= Emeka Opara =

Nigerian footballer (born 1984)

Personal information
- Date of birth: 2 December 1984 (age 41)
- Place of birth: Imo State, Nigeria
- Height: 1.86 m (6 ft 1 in)
- Position: Striker

Senior career*
Years	Team	Apps	(Gls)
2001–2003	Enugu Rangers		
2004–2006	Étoile Sportive du Sahel	40	(21)
2007–2008	1. FC Kaiserslautern	33	(4)
2008–2009	Étoile Sportive du Sahel	21	(11)
2009–2011	Khazar Lankaran	42	(10)
2012	Al Naser	19	(11)
2013	Qarabağ	10	(1)
2014–2015	Kano Pillars	15	(8)
- * Club domestic league appearances and goals as of 19 July 2015

Emeka Opara // (born 2 December 1984) is a Nigerian football striker. He is a classic centre-forward with pace and very strong in the air.

== Career ==
In 2006, he had an impressive run of form in the CAF Confederation Cup while playing for Tunisian club Étoile Sportive du Sahel, taking them to the final of the competition, whilst netting eight goals.

In January 2012, Opara left FK Khazar Lankaran, and signed a six-month contract with Al Naser of the Kuwaiti Premier League. In March 2013, Opara returned to the Azerbaijan Premier League, signing for FK Qarabağ.

== Career statistics ==
As of match played 19 May 2013

Appearances and goals by club, season and competition
Club	Season	League			National Cup		Continental		Total	
Club	Season	Division	Apps	Goals	Apps	Goals	Apps	Goals	Apps	Goals
Khazar Lankaran	2009–10	Azerbaijan Premier League	14	4	4	1	0	0	18	5
Khazar Lankaran	2010–11	Azerbaijan Premier League	15	3	4	0	2	0	21	3
Khazar Lankaran	2011–12	Azerbaijan Premier League	12	3	0	0	2	0	14	3
Khazar Lankaran	Total		41	10	8	1	4	0	53	11
Qarabağ	2012–13	Azerbaijan Premier League	10	1	2	1	–		12	2
Career total			51	11	10	2	4	0	65	13
