= Adrian Iordache =

Romanian footballer

Personal information
- Full name: Adrian Gheorghe Iordache
- Date of birth: 12 September 1980 (age 46)
- Place of birth: Pitești, Romania
- Height: 1.89 m (6 ft 2 in)
- Position: Centre-back

Youth career
- Sporting Pitești
- –1999: Dinamo București

Senior career*
Years	Team	Apps	(Gls)
2000–2005	Dinamo București	41	(3)
2000–2005	Dinamo II București	17	(3)
2000–2002	→ Poiana Câmpina (loan)	50	(3)
2002–2003	→ Oțelul Galați (loan)	26	(3)
2006	Shinnik Yaroslavl	11	(0)
2007	Argeș Pitești	11	(0)
2007–2008	Alki Larnaca	18	(0)
2008–2009	AEL Limassol	13	(0)
2009–2010	Rapid București	14	(1)
2010–2011	Khazar Lankaran	15	(0)
2011–2012	Mioveni	19	(1)
2013	Gloria Bistrița	11	(0)
Total		246	(14)

Managerial career
- 2015–2016: Al-Faisaly (assistant)
- 2017–2018: Al-Tai (assistant)
- 2018–2019: Botoșani (assistant)
- 2019–2020: Lebanon (assistant)
- 2021: Hermannstadt (assistant)
- 2021–2023: Voluntari (assistant)
- 2023: Sepsi OSK (assistant)
- 2024–2025: Botoșani (assistant)
- 2025: Petrolul Ploiești (assistant)
- * Club domestic league appearances and goals

Adrian Gheorghe Iordache (born 12 September 1980) is a Romanian former professional footballer who played as a centre-back.

== Honours ==
Dinamo București

- Divizia A : 1999–00, 2003–2004
- Cupa României : 2003–04, 2004–05

AEL Limassol

- Cypriot Cup runner-up : 2008–09

Khazar Lankaran

- Azerbaijan Cup : 2010–11
