= Stelian Stancu =

Romanian footballer

Personal information
- Date of birth: 22 September 1981 (age 45)
- Place of birth: Tecuci, Romania
- Height: 1.79 m (5 ft 10 1/2 in)
- Positions: Right back; right midfielder

Senior career*
Years	Team	Apps	(Gls)
2000–2002	Astra Ploiești	8	(0)
2002	→ Metalul Plopeni (loan)	3	(0)
2002–2006	Sportul Studențesc	103	(3)
2006–2007	Steaua București	17	(1)
2007–2010	FC Timișoara	89	(6)
2010	FC Brașov	8	(0)
2010–2011	Khazar Lankaran	19	(1)
2011–2012	Sportul Studențesc	6	(1)
2012–2013	Târgu Mureș	11	(0)
2013–2015	Academica Argeș	45	(4)
2015	Balotești	9	(0)
2016	Burriana		
2016–2017	Voința Crevedia		
2018	Carmen București		
2019	Burriana		
Total		318	(16)

Managerial career
- 2015: Balotești (assistant)
- 2016–2017: Voința Crevedia (assistant)
- * Club domestic league appearances and goals as of 24 April 2020

Stelian Stancu (born 22 September 1981) is a Romanian former footballer who played as a right back or right midfielder for teams such as Sportul Studențesc, Steaua București, FC Timișoara, Khazar Lankaran or Academica Clinceni, among others.

== Club career ==
Stancu made his debut playing for Astra Ploiești in 2000, before being loaned to Metalul Plopeni and joining the squad of Sportul Studențesc of Bucharest in 2002. After Sportul was relegated, he joined Steaua București on 31 August 2006, where he appeared in 17 league matches. He transferred to FC Timișoara in the summer break of 2007 for a reported fee of €200,000. The first goal for FC Timișoara was against FC Argeș on 28 February 2009.

== Honours ==
Sportul Studențesc

- Liga II: Winner (1) 2003–04

Khazar Lankaran

- Azerbaijan Cup: Winner (1) 2010–11
