= Dejan Rusič =

Slovenian footballer

Personal information
- Date of birth: 5 December 1982 (age 43)
- Place of birth: Brežice, SFR Yugoslavia
- Height: 1.88 m (6 ft 2 in)
- Position: Striker

Senior career*
Years	Team	Apps	(Gls)
2002–2004	Krško	60	(16)
2004–2007	Celje	54	(16)
2007–2010	Timişoara	42	(9)
2010	Spartak Nalchik	7	(1)
2011	Al-Taawoun	10	(5)
2011–2012	Khazar Lankaran	15	(3)
2012–2013	Al-Taawoun	15	(2)
2016	Krško	1	(0)
Total		204	(52)

International career
2006–2008	Slovenia	4	(0)
- * Club domestic league appearances and goals

Dejan Rusič (born 5 December 1982) is a Slovenian retired footballer who played as a striker.

He was capped four times for the Slovenia national team between 2006 in 2008.

== Career statistics ==
=== International ===
Slovenia national team
Year	Apps	Goals
2006	2	0
2007	1	0
2008	1	0
Total	4	0

Statistics accurate as of match played 6 February 2008
