= Cătălin Doman =

Romanian footballer (born 1988)

Personal information
- Full name: Cătălin Petre Doman
- Date of birth: 30 January 1988 (age 38)
- Place of birth: Drobeta-Turnu Severin, Romania
- Height: 1.78 m (5 ft 10 in)
- Position: Midfielder

Team information
- Current team: SCM Râmnicu Vâlcea
- Number: 29

Youth career
- 2001–2006: Argeș Pitești

Senior career*
| Years | Team | Apps | (Gls) |
| 2006–2013 | Argeș Pitești | 78 | (7) |
| 2007 | → Dacia Mioveni (loan) | 14 | (1) |
| 2010–2012 | → Khazar Lankaran (loan) | 44 | (6) |
| 2013–2014 | Rapid București | 15 | (1) |
| 2015–2018 | ACS Poli Timișoara | 53 | (6) |
| 2018 | → Dunărea Călărași (loan) | 6 | (0) |
| 2019 | Vedița Colonești | 15 | (9) |
| 2020–2025 | CSM Slatina | 121 | (28) |
| 2025– | SCM Râmnicu Vâlcea | 0 | (0) |

International career
| 2008–2009 | Romania U21 | 10 | (1) |
- * Club domestic league appearances and goals as of 8 March 2025

Cătălin Petre Doman (born 30 January 1988) is a Romanian professional footballer who plays as a midfielder for Liga II club SCM Râmnicu Vâlcea.

== Club career ==
Doman played in Argeș Pitești youth team. In 2006, he was promoted to the first team, where he played only 3 games, then he moved to Romanian team Dacia Mioveni where he played 14 games and scored 1 goal. In 2007, he moved back to FC Argeș Pitești where he played 67 games and scored 6 goals.

== Honours ==
Argeș Pitești

- Liga II: 2007–08

Khazar Lankaran

- Azerbaijan Cup: 2010–11

ACS Poli Timișoara

- Liga II: 2014–15

Dunărea Călărași

- Liga II: 2017–18

CSM Slatina

- Liga III: 2019–20, 2021–22
