= Hristu Chiacu =

Romanian footballer

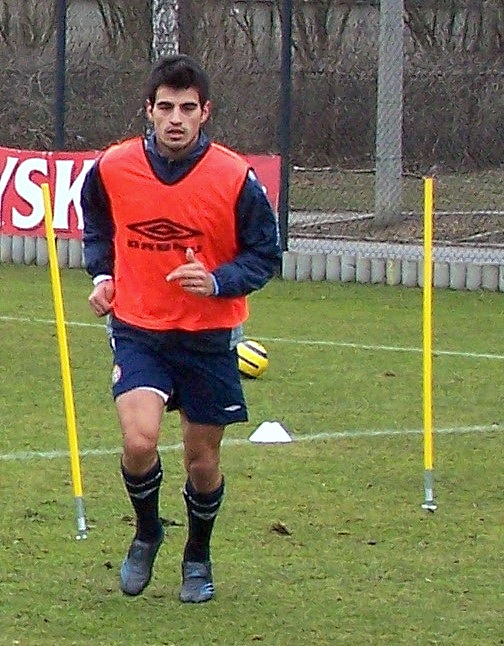
- Chiacu training in 2007

Personal information
- Date of birth: 6 September 1986 (age 40)
- Place of birth: Bucharest, Romania
- Height: 1.86 m (6 ft 1 in)
- Position: Winger

Youth career
- 1994–2003: Dinamo București

Senior career*
| Years | Team | Apps | (Gls) |
| 2003 | Unirea Urziceni | 2 | (1) |
| 2004 | Electromagnetica | 9 | (4) |
| 2004–2006 | Național București | 17 | (2) |
| 2006–2007 | Wisła Kraków | 11 | (1) |
| 2007–2012 | Dinamo București | 10 | (0) |
| 2008 | → Dacia Mioveni (loan) | 10 | (0) |
| 2008–2009 | → Otopeni (loan) | 17 | (4) |
| 2009 | → Astra Ploiești (loan) | 3 | (0) |
| 2009–2011 | → Politehnica Timișoara (loan) | 20 | (5) |
| 2011 | → Khazar Lankaran (loan) | 12 | (3) |
| 2011 | → Ceahlăul Piatra Neamț (loan) | 7 | (0) |
| 2012 | → Concordia Chiajna (loan) | 0 | (0) |
| 2013–2014 | Săgeata Năvodari | 5 | (0) |
| 2014–2015 | Balotești | 19 | (7) |
| 2016 | Sighetu Marmației | | |
| 2016 | Tunari | 12 | (3) |
| 2017 | Academica Clinceni | 9 | (5) |
| 2018 | Tunari | 3 | (3) |
| 2019 | Carmen București | | |
| Total | | 166 | (38) |

International career
| 2003 | Romania U17 | 4 | (2) |
| 2004 | Romania U19 | 1 | (0) |
| 2005–2006 | Romania U21 | 19 | (3) |
- * Club domestic league appearances and goals

Hristu Chiacu (born 6 September 1986) is a Romanian former professional footballer who played as a midfielder for teams such as Național București, Wisła Kraków, Dinamo București, CS Otopeni, Politehnica Timișoara or Khazar Lankaran, among others.

== Personal life ==
Chiacu is an ethnic Aromanian.

== Club career ==
=== Early career ===
Chiacu began his youth career at Dinamo București.

=== Unirea Urziceni ===
Chiacu signed his first professional contract with Unirea, where he scored one goal in two appearances.

=== Electromagnetica ===
He transferred to Electromagnetica, where he scored four goals in nine appearances.

=== Național București ===
Chiacu made his debut against FC Timișoara. He finished the season with 17 appearances for Național.

=== Wisła Kraków ===
He signed with Polish club Wisła Kraków at Dan Petrescu's request. He scored one goal in the Ekstraklasa.

=== Dinamo București ===
He returned to Romania at the team where started football, Dinamo, but play just ten matches because he was loaned out all time.

=== Dacia Mioveni ===
Chiacu was loaned out to Dacia Mioveni for six months, making ten appearances.

=== CS Otopeni ===
In 2008 summer, Chiacu was loaned out again at newly promoted CS Otopeni for all season long, making 17 appearances and scoring one goal.

=== Astra Ploiești ===
Chiacu was again loaned out at Astra, just for few weeks.

=== Politehnica Timișoara ===
Chiacu was loaned two years by Dinamo at Poli. He was released on 14 January 2011 for poor displays and returned to Dinamo.

== Personal life ==
His brother, Teodor was also a footballer who played for Dinamo București.

== Honours ==
Khazar Lankaran

- Azerbaijan Cup: 2010–11
