= Diego Ruiz (footballer) =

Argentine footballer (born 1980)

Diego Ruíz
Personal information
- Full name: Diego Alejandro Ruíz Scheuschner
- Date of birth: 19 December 1980 (age 45)
- Place of birth: San Miguel de Tucumán, Argentina
- Height: 1.90 m (6 ft 3 in)
- Position: Forward

Youth career
- 1997–1999: Lanús

Senior career*
Years	Team	Apps	(Gls)
1999–2000	San Telmo	20	(4)
2000–2001	Ñuñorco	23	(4)
2002–2003	Atlético Tucumán	19	(5)
2003–2004	Kortrijk	30	(8)
2004	Cobresal	11	(3)
2004–2005	Gent	25	(7)
2005–2008	Huachipato	122	(25)
2008–2010	CFR Cluj	29	(5)
2009	→ Kasımpaşa (loan)	4	(0)
2010	Khazar Lankaran	8	(2)
2010–2011	ASA Târgu Mureș	17	(2)
2012	Deportes Antofagasta	20	(5)
2013–2014	Universidad de Concepción	36	(6)
2014–2015	Everton	19	(3)
2015–2018	Iberia	88	(30)
Total		471	(109)
- * Club domestic league appearances and goals

Diego Alejandro Ruíz Scheuschner (born 19 December 1980) is an Argentine former professional footballer who played as a forward.

== Club career ==
Ruiz started his peripatetic playing career in 1997 at Lanús in Argentina. He then had spells in the lower leagues of Argentine football with San Telmo, Club Atlético Ñuñorco and Atlético Tucumán. In 2004, he joined Belgian side KV Kortrijk followed by Cobresal of Chile, then back to Belgium with K.A.A. Gent, and back to Chile again with Huachipato in the Liga Chilena de Fútbol, where he had his best spell as a professional. He was transferred to Romanian club CFR Cluj in 2008, just in time to be part of CFR's championship squad of 2007–08, but was loaned to Kasımpaşa in 2009. For a half a season he played in Azerbaijan for Khazar Lankaran before having his contract mutually terminated in January 2011. He returned to Romania with FCM Târgu Mureş. In January 2012, Ruiz went back to Chile, joining newly promoted Deportes Antofagasta.

On 12 October 2025, Ruiz returned to the football activity by joining club Ferroviarios from Monte Águila in the ANFA tournament from Yumbel.

== Personal life ==
His son, Luca, is a football striker from the Huachipato youth ranks.

== Honours ==
CFR Cluj

- Liga I: 2007–08
- Romanian Cup: 2008, 2009
- Supercupa României: 2009

Universidad de Concepción

- Primera B: 2013 Transición
