= Cosmin Frăsinescu =

Romanian footballer

Personal information
- Full name: Cosmin Valentin Frăsinescu
- Date of birth: 10 February 1985 (age 41)
- Place of birth: Bacău, Romania
- Height: 1.89 m (6 ft 2 in)
- Position: Defender

Senior career*
Years	Team	Apps	(Gls)
2001–2003	Baia Mare	5	(0)
2003–2011	Gloria Bistrița	127	(6)
2007	→ Forex Brașov (loan)	8	(0)
2011	→ Khazar Lankaran (loan)	4	(0)
2011–2014	Gaz Metan Mediaș	84	(3)
2014–2015	Universitatea Craiova	28	(0)
2015–2021	Politehnica Iași	188	(5)
Total		444	(14)

International career
2003–2004	Romania U-19	4	(0)
2004	Romania U-21	1	(0)
- * Club domestic league appearances and goals as of 6 August 2021

Cosmin Valentin Frăsinescu (born 10 February 1985) is a Romanian former professional footballer who played as a defender.

== Honours ==
Khazar Lankaran

- Azerbaijan Cup: 2010–11
