= Davit Imedashvili =

Georgian footballer

Personal information
- Date of birth: 15 December 1984 (age 41)
- Place of birth: Rustavi, Georgian SSR
- Height: 1.87 m (6 ft 1 1/2 in)
- Position: Defender

Youth career
- FC WIT Georgia

Senior career*
Years	Team	Apps	(Gls)
2002–2006	WIT Georgia	84	(12)
2006–2008	Dynamo Kyiv	2	(0)
2006–2009	Dynamo-2 Kyiv	5	(0)
2007	→ Ventspils (loan)	1	(0)
2008–2009	→ Nyíregyháza (loan)	11	(1)
2009–2010	Olimpi Rustavi	31	(8)
2010	Khazar Lankaran	1	(0)
2013–2014	Sioni Bolnisi	24	(0)
2014–2015	Tskhinvali	8	(0)
2015–2016	Metalurgi Rustavi	22	(2)
2016	Samtredia	4	(0)

International career
2006	Georgia	1	(0)
- * Club domestic league appearances and goals

Davit Imedashvili (Georgian: დავით იმედაშვილი; born 15 December 1984) is a former Georgian footballer.
