= Stevan Bates =

Serbian retired footballer

Personal information
- Date of birth: 29 November 1981 (age 44)
- Place of birth: Belgrade, SFR Yugoslavia
- Position: Defender

Team information
- Current team: Shanghai Port (assistant)

Senior career*
Years	Team	Apps	(Gls)
2000–2002.	Železničar Beograd	58	(1)
2002–2005	Železnik	59	(4)
2004	→ Alania Vladikavkaz (loan)	15	(1)
2005–2006	Rad	26	(2)
2006–2009	Châteauroux	66	(3)
2009–2010	Baku	30	(0)
2010	Tromsø	1	(0)
2011–2012	Baku	28	(0)
2012–2013	Rad	0	(0)
2012	→ Khazar Lankaran (loan)	8	(0)
2012–2013	→ Mes Kerman (loan)	27	(0)
2013	OFK Beograd	7	(0)
2014–2015	Hunan Billows	53	(1)
2016–2017	Rad	35	(1)

Managerial career
- 2018–2020: Partizan (U17 assistant)
- 2021–: Shanghai Port (assistant)
- * Club domestic league appearances and goals

Stevan Bates (Serbian Cyrillic: Стеван Батес; born 29 November 1981) is a Serbian football coach and former player who played as a defender. He is an assistant coach for the Chinese club Shanghai Port.

== Club career ==
Born in Belgrade, Bates played in Yugoslavia/Serbia for Železničar Beograd, Železnik and Rad, in Russia for Alania Vladikavkaz, in France for LB Châteauroux, and in Azerbaijan for FC Baku. (Note: Stevan Bates – French league stats at LFP – also available in French (archived))

Bates played one league game for Tromsø IL in the Norwegian Premier League 2010 season. He did not manage to break into the Tromsø first team squad, and agreed to leave the club after the 2010 season, re-signing for his former club FC Baku.

On 16 January 2014, Bates transferred to China League One side Hunan Billows.

In summer 2017, Bates retired from playing football professionally.

== Coaching career ==
In January 2021, Bates was appointed assistant manager of Ivan Leko at Shanghai Port.
