= Allan Lalín =

Honduran footballer (born 1981)

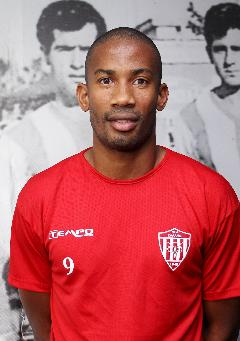

Personal information
- Full name: Allan Moisés Lalín Pérez
- Date of birth: January 5, 1981 (age 45)
- Place of birth: Tegucigalpa, Honduras
- Height: 1.86 m (6 ft 1 in)
- Position: Forward

Team information
- Current team: Platense

Senior career*
Years	Team	Apps	(Gls)
2003	Honduras Salzburg		(0)
2003–2004	Victoria		(3)
2004–2005	Atlético Olanchano		(1)
2005–2009	Real España	57	(13)
2009–2011	Khazar Lankaran	43	(11)
2011–2013	Real España	50	(9)
2013	Niki Volos	20	(3)
2013–2014	Nea Salamina	10	(1)
2014	Paniliakos	13	(3)
2015	Platense	25	(6)
2016–	Real España	7	(0)

International career^{‡}
2006–	Honduras	13	(2)
Medal record
Honduras
Third place	UNCAF Nations Cup	2009
- * Club domestic league appearances and goals as of 16 March 2016 ‡ National team caps and goals as of 6 January 2015

Allan Moisés Lalín Pérez (born January 5, 1981) is a Honduran footballer who plays for Platense F.C. in the Liga Nacional de Fútbol Profesional de Honduras as a forward.

== Club career ==
The tall striker made his senior debut for Honduras Salzburg in March 2003 against Victoria, then played for Victoria before experiencing relegation with Atlético Olanchano in 2005. He went on trial with Wisła Kraków, then champions of the Polish League, but failed to impress and returned to Honduras, where he eventually went on to play with Real España. He left Real España in July 2009, to play for Khazar Lankaran in the Azerbaijan Premier League. Lalín had his contract with Khazar Lankaran cancelled halfway through the 2010–11, citing "unsatisfactory performance". He signed for Real Espana again in July 2011, after being left out of the Khazar squad for six months by the new coach. In January 2012 he was set to move abroad again to join Chinese second division side Hunan Billows on loan to play alongside compatriots Emil Martínez, Erick Norales and Astor Henríquez. He was however not given a contract after a 15-days trial and returned to Real España. In January 2013 Lalín joined Football League side Niki Volos after his contract with Real España was not extended. In August 2013 Lalin joined Cypriot First Division side Nea Salamis. In January 2014 Lalin joined Football League (Greece) side Paniliakos F.C.

== International career ==
Lalín made his debut for Honduras in an August 2006 friendly match against Venezuela and has, as of January 2013, earned a total of 14 caps, scoring 2 goals. He has represented his country at the 2009 CONCACAF Gold Cups. and helped his team progress to the Quarter-Finals by providing two crucial assists in the match against Grenada, which Honduras won by 4–0.

== Career statistics ==
=== Club ===
Club performance			League		Cup		Continental		Total	
Season	Club	League	Apps	Goals	Apps	Goals	Apps	Goals	Apps	Goals
Azerbaijan			League		Azerbaijan Cup		Europe		Total	
2009–10	Khazar Lankaran	Azerbaijan Premier League	27	9	7	1	-		34	10
2010–11	Khazar Lankaran	Azerbaijan Premier League	16	2	1	1	2	1	19	4
Honduras			League		Cup		CONCACAF		Total	
2011–12	Real España	Liga Nacional	33	7	-		5	1	38	8
2012–13	Real España	Liga Nacional	17	2	-		-		17	2
Greece			League		Greek Cup		Europe		Total	
2012–13	Niki Volos	Football League	20	3			-		20	3
Cyprus			League		Cypriot Cup		Europe		Total	
2013–14	Nea Salamis	Cypriot First Division	10	1			-		10	1
Greece			League		Greek Cup		Europe		Total	
2013–14	Paniliakos F.C.	Football League	13	3			-		13	3
Total	Azerbaijan		43	11	8	2	2	1	53	14
Total	Honduras		50	9	-		5	1	55	10
Total	Greece		33	6			-		33	6
Total	Cyprus		10	1			-		10	1
Career total			136	27	8	2	7	2	151	31

=== International goals ===
Allan Lalín: International goals
No.	Date	Venue	Opponent	Score	Result	Competition
1	28 June 2009	Estadio Rommel Fernández, Panama City, Panama	Panama	1 – 0	2 – 0	Friendly
2	2 June 2012	Robert F. Kennedy Memorial Stadium, Washington D.C., United States	El Salvador	3 – 0	3 – 0	Friendly

== Personal life ==
Colorado Rapids footballer Hendry Thomas is his cousin.
