= Radomir Todorov =

Bulgarian footballer

Personal information
- Date of birth: 11 August 1980 (age 46)
- Place of birth: Varna, Bulgaria
- Height: 1.84 m (6 ft 0 in)
- Positions: Left back; midfielder

Senior career*
Years	Team	Apps	(Gls)
1998–2002	Spartak Varna	63	(3)
2002–2003	Naftex Burgas	15	(2)
2004	Spartak Varna	14	(4)
2004–2007	Naftex Burgas	69	(5)
2006	→ Chernomorets (loan)	11	(3)
2007–2010	Khazar Lankaran	95	(1)
2011	Baku	7	(0)
2011	Spartak Varna	9	(0)
2012–2013	Khazar Lankaran	46	(0)
2014–2015	Spartak Varna	25	(0)

Managerial career
- 2022: Spartak Varna (assistant)
- 2023: Dobrudzha (assistant)
- 2023–2024: Dobrudzha
- 2025: Spartak Varna II
- 2026–: Aksakovo
- * Club domestic league appearances and goals

Radomir Todorov (Bulgarian: Радомир Тодоров; born 11 August 1980 in Varna) is a Bulgarian former footballer who played as a midfielder.

== Career ==
Todorov left Khazar Lankaran, at the end of his two-year contract, in December 2013.

== Career statistics ==
As of 22 November 2013

Club performance			League		Cup		Continental		Other		Total	
Season	Club	League	Apps	Goals	Apps	Goals	Apps	Goals	Apps	Goals	Apps	Goals
Azerbaijan			League		Azerbaijan Cup		Europe		Supercup/CIS Cup		Total	
2007–08	Khazar Lankaran	Azerbaijan Premier League	24	1	4	0	2	0	5	0	35	0
2008–09	Khazar Lankaran	Azerbaijan Premier League	24	0	4	0	2	0	-		30	0
2009–10	Khazar Lankaran	Azerbaijan Premier League	29	0	5	0	-		-		34	0
2010–11	Khazar Lankaran	Azerbaijan Premier League	18	0	1	0	2	0	-		21	0
2010–11	Baku	Azerbaijan Premier League	7	0	4	0	-		-		11	0
2011–12	Khazar Lankaran	Azerbaijan Premier League	11	0	1	0	0	0	-		12	0
2012–13	Khazar Lankaran	Azerbaijan Premier League	26	0	4	0	3	0	-		33	0
2013–14	Khazar Lankaran	Azerbaijan Premier League	4	0	0	0	4	0	0	0	8	0
Total	Azerbaijan		143	1	28	0	13	0	0	0	184	0
Career total			143	1	28	0	13	0	0	0	184	0

== Honours ==
=== Player ===
- Khazar Lankaran
  - Azerbaijan Cup (1) - 2007-08
  - Azerbaijan Supercup (1) - 2013
