= Winston Parks =

Costa Rican footballer (born 1981)

Personal information
- Full name: Winston Antonio Parks Tifet
- Date of birth: 12 October 1981 (age 45)
- Place of birth: Limón, Costa Rica
- Height: 1.84 m (6 ft 0 in)
- Position: Forward

Senior career*
Years	Team	Apps	(Gls)
1999–2001	Limonense	49	(12)
2001–2002	Udinese	0	(0)
2002	→ Ascoli (loan)	3	(0)
2003–2006	Lokomotiv Moscow	35	(6)
2005	→ Saturn Ramenskoye (loan)	11	(3)
2006–2007	Slovan Liberec	17	(1)
2007–2008	Alajuelense	23	(3)
2008–2011	Politehnica Timişoara	49	(6)
2010–2011	→ Khazar Lankaran (loan)	25	(8)
2011–2012	Baku	30	(9)
2013	Uruguay Coronado	5	(1)
2014	Limón	14	(2)
2015–2016	Santos de Guápiles	23	(5)
Total		235	(44)

International career
1999–2001	Costa Rica U20	10	(7)
2001–2011	Costa Rica	27	(6)
- * Club domestic league appearances and goals

Winston Antonio Parks Tifet known also as "Bounty” (born 12 October 1981) is a Costa Rican former professional footballer who played as a forward.

He played in Europe for Udinese, Ascoli, Slovan Liberec, Lokomotiv Moscow, Saturn Ramenskoye, Politehnica Timişoara and Baku.

== Club career ==
Winston made his debut in the Costa Rican Primera División in 1999 with only in 17-year-old, playing with his hometown team Limonense and scored his first goal back on 28 November of the same year, he played this season mostly as a substitute, because he was competing at that moment against some players that succeeded during the next few years, like Kurt Bernard, Andy Herron, Rayner Robinson and Ricardo Douglas for a place in the starting line-up. The following season and after the sale of most of the players mentioned before, it was usual to see him in the starting line-up making a dangerous offensive triplet with Victor Núñez and Andy Herron.

His high internationally performances led the Italian club Udinese to purchase the player for $2.1 million from Limonense. However, due to injuries Parks was unable to earn a place in the club's first team, he was loaned for six months to Ascoli and eventually moved on to Lokomotiv Moscow, he was again loaned to Saturn Ramenskoye and then he was sold to Slovan Liberec.

After spending six years in Europe he decided to moved back to Costa Rica looking for more minutes on the field in other the get in shape and find again his game and ability. He signed with Alajuelense in summer 2007, but he has had a lot of injuries and only scored two goals in the Apertura's tournament.

=== Politehnica Timișoara ===
He returned to Europa and signed for the Romanian club in summer 2008. Parks made his debut in an away match against FC Argeş where he played just one minute. He scored his first two goals against CS Otopeni in a 2–2 draw. In an away match at Gloria Bistriţa he made his worst match of his career and was criticized by the chairman Marian Iancu and put him on transfer list.

=== Khazar Lankaran ===
On 13 August 2010, he was loaned out to Khazar Lankaran with option to buy him at end of the season. He was the goalscorer of the team on 2010–11 season.

=== Baku ===
Parks joined Baku from at the start of the 2011–12 season. After 9 goals in 36 appearances in all competitions for Baku, he left the club at the end of the 2012–13 season.

=== Uruguay Coronado ===
In September 2013, Parks joined Costa Rican Primera División side Uruguay Coronado.

Ahead of the 2014 Verano season, Parks moved to second division side Siquirreña and in summer 2014 he returned to his hometown to play for Limón. He joined Santos de Guápiles in January 2015.

== International career ==
Parks gained recognition as an exceptional youth player, appearing in FIFA World Youth Championships U-17 in 1999 held in Nigeria and U-20 in 2001 held in Argentina, and leading Costa Rica during the 2001 U-20 tournament, with four goals.

After making his full national team debut in a November 2001 FIFA World Cup qualification match against Jamaica, he made the roster for the 2002 World Cup, where he appeared in two games as a substitute. Against Turkey he scored the equalizing goal, but failed to score on a second opportunity. He also had a great game against Brazil. His lack of playing time and injuries have, however, resulted in Parks seeing little time during 2006 World Cup qualifying.

He earned a total of 27 caps, scoring 6 goals and represented his country at the 2003 CONCACAF Gold Cup.

His final international was a November 2011 friendly match against Spain.

== Career statistics ==
Scores and results list. Costa Rica's goal tally first.

Goal	Date	Venue	Opponent	Score	Result	Competition
1	17 April 2002	International Stadium Yokohama, Yokohama, Japan	Japan	1 – 1	1–1	Friendly
2	9 June 2002	Incheon Munhak Stadium, Incheon, South Korea	Turkey	1 – 1	1–1	2002 FIFA World Cup
3	29 March 2003	Estadio Alejandro Morera Soto, Alajuela, Costa Rica	Paraguay	2 – 1	2–1	Friendly
4	4 June 2004	Estadio Ricardo Saprissa, Tibás, San José, Costa Rica	Nicaragua	2 – 0	5–1	Friendly
5	4 June 2004	Estadio Ricardo Saprissa, Tibás, San José, Costa Rica	Nicaragua	4 – 0	5–1	Friendly
6	1 June 2010	Stade Tourbillon, Sion, Switzerland	Switzerland	0 – 1	0–1	Friendly

== Honours ==
Season	Club	Title
2004	(Russia) Lokomotiv Moscow	Russian Premier League
2005	(Russia) Lokomotiv Moscow	Russian Super Cup
2010–11	(Azerbaijan) Khazar Lankaran	Azerbaijan Cup
2011–12	(Azerbaijan) FC Baku	Azerbaijan Cup
