= Yevhen Kopyl =

Ukrainian footballer

Personal information
- Full name: Yevhen Petrovych Kopyl
- Date of birth: 25 May 1986 (age 40)
- Place of birth: Kyiv, Soviet Union
- Height: 1.90 m (6 ft 3 in)
- Position: Goalkeeper

Youth career
- Dynamo Kyiv

Senior career*
Years	Team	Apps	(Gls)
2003–2007	Dynamo-3 Kyiv	11	(0)
2003–2007	Dynamo-2 Kyiv	5	(0)
2007–2008	Zagłębie Sosnowiec	4	(0)
2008–2009	Zagłębie Lubin II	7	(0)
2009–2010	Zagłębie Lubin	1	(0)
2010	Zorya Luhansk	0	(0)
2011	Khazar Lankaran	1	(0)
2015	Dinaz Vyshhorod	5	(0)
- * Club domestic league appearances and goals

Yevhen Petrovych Kopyl (Ukrainian: Євген Петрович Копил; born 25 May 1986) is a Ukrainian former professional footballer who played as a goalkeeper.
