= Julius Wobay =

Sierra Leonean footballer (born 1984)

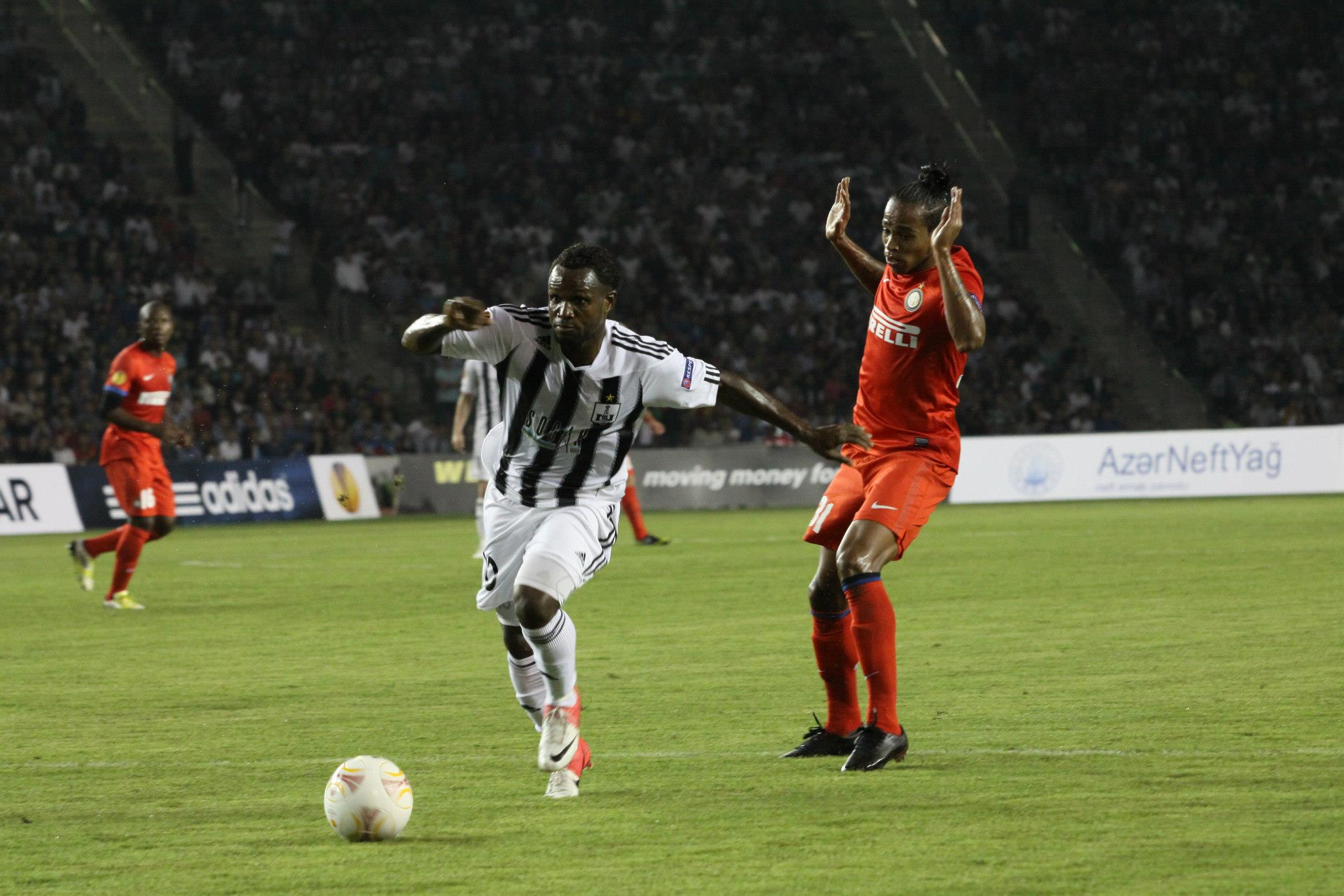

Personal information
- Full name: Julius Gibrilla Wobay
- Date of birth: 19 May 1984 (age 42)
- Place of birth: Freetown, Sierra Leone
- Height: 1.68 m (5 ft 6 in)
- Position: Attacking midfielder

Senior career*
Years	Team	Apps	(Gls)
2000–2003	East End Lions		
2003–2004	Onisilos Sotira	12	(3)
2004–2007	Nea Salamis Famagusta FC	61	(24)
2007–2010	Universitatea Craiova	102	(12)
2010	→ Aris Limassol (loan)	5	(1)
2011	Khazar Lankaran	19	(5)
2012	Al-Masry	0	(0)
2012–2015	Neftchi Baku	58	(15)
2013–2014	→ Al Shaab (loan)	12	(1)
2016–2017	Olimpija Ljubljana	33	(3)

International career
2001–2018	Sierra Leone	29	(2)
- * Club domestic league appearances and goals as of 1 June 2017

Julius Gibrilla Wobay (born 19 May 1984) is a Sierra Leonean international footballer who plays as an attacking midfielder.

== Football career ==
=== East End Lions ===
Julius Gibrilla Wobay was born and raised in Freetown, Sierra Leone to parents from the Mende ethnic group. He attended the Ahmadiyya Muslim Secondary School in Freetown. He began his professional football career in his native Sierra Leone with East End Lions in the Sierra Leone National Premier League.

=== Cyprus ===
After the 2003 season, Wobay left the Sierra Leone National Premier League and signed with Cyprus side Onisilos Sotira where he played 12 matches and scored three goals. Then Wobay signed with Nea Salamis Famagusta FC, a club in Cyprus top division.

=== Universitatea Craiova ===
In January 2007, Wobay moved to Romanian Liga I side Universitatea Craiova on a four-and-a-half-year contract from Cypriot club Nea Salamina FC for $450k.

=== Aris Limassol ===
Three years after his movement from Salamina to Craiova, Wobay comes back (on a loan until the end of the season) to Cyprus but this time for Aris Limassol. On 20/1 he signed his contract with Cypriot side. The deal doesn't include a summer buying option for Aris Limassol.

=== Khazar Lankaran ===
After returning to Universitatea Craiova for the first half of the 2010–11 season, Wobay went on to sign a two-year contract with Khazar Lankaran in the Azerbaijan Premier League during the winter break. Wobay went on to make 26 appearances for Khazar, scoring 6 goals.

=== Al-Masry ===
On 31 January 2012, Wobay signed for Al-Masry of Egypt on a contract till the end of 2011–12 season, and was in the stands watching his new club as the Port Said Stadium riot unfolded.

=== Neftchi Baku ===
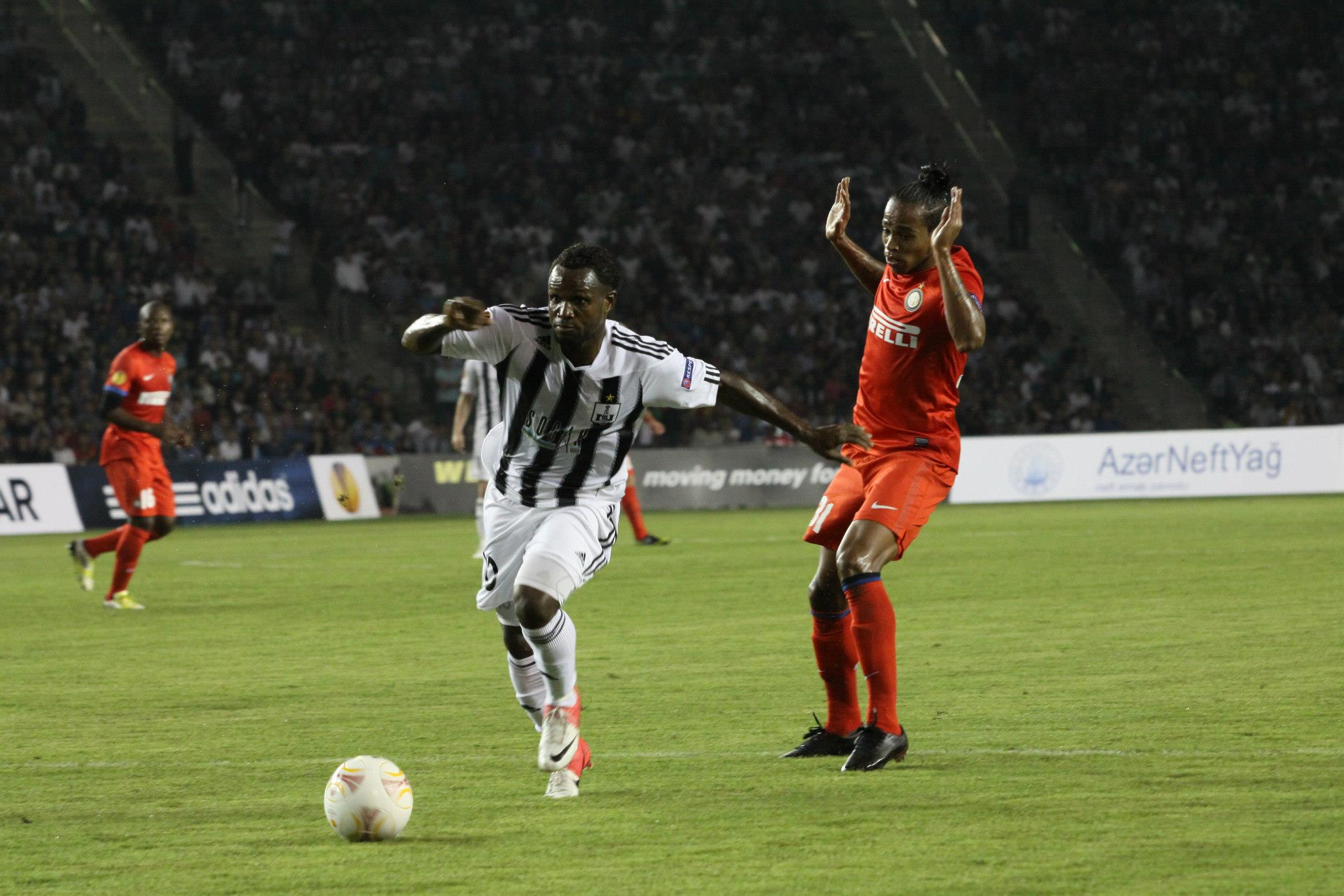
Julius Wobay in action during a match against Internazionale in 2012.

During the summer of 2012 Wobay signed a one-year contract with Neftchi Baku. Wobay made his club debut in their 3–0 UEFA Champions League second qualifying round 1st leg match against Zestaponi, scoring the second goal. Wobay followed this up with a goal in the second leg and one in their 6–2 aggregate defeat to Ironi Kiryat Shmona in the third round, which saw them knocked into the UEFA Europa League play off round where Wobay also scored to help Neftchi reach the group stage of the UEFA Europa League for the first time. During the 2012–13 season Wobay played in 31 league games, scoring eight goals, and five cup games to help Neftchi win a 2013 League and Cup double.

Wobay has signed a new contract with Neftchi in June 2013, before moving on loan to Al Shabab of the UAE Arabian Gulf League on a year-long loan in July 2013. Wobay was deregistered by Al Shabab during the 2014 January transfer window.

=== Olimpija ===
On 29 January 2016 Wobay signed a one-and-a-half-year contract with Slovenian club Olimpija Ljubljana.

== International ==
On 14 February 2001 Wobay made his debut for the Sierra Leone national team in a 2002 FIFA World Cup qualifier against Liberia in a match played in the Liberian capital of Monrovia. He retired from international football in December 2018.

== Career statistics ==
As of 12 December 2017

Club statistics
Season	Club	League	League		Cup		Continental		Total	
Season	Club	League	App	Goals	App	Goals	App	Goals	App	Goals
2003–04	Onisilos Sotira	Cypriot First Division	12	3			—		12	3
2004–05	Nea Salamis Famagusta	Cypriot First Division	25	9			—		25	9
2005–06	Nea Salamis Famagusta	Cypriot First Division	22	11			—		22	11
2006–07	Nea Salamis Famagusta	Cypriot First Division	14	4			—		14	4
2006–07	Universitatea Craiova	Liga I	14	0	0	0	—		14	0
2007–08	Universitatea Craiova	Liga I	31	4	1	0	—		32	4
2008–09	Universitatea Craiova	Liga I	28	3	2	0	—		30	3
2009–10	Universitatea Craiova	Liga I	14	2	3	0	—		17	2
2009–10	Aris Limassol (loan)	Cypriot First Division	5	1			—		5	1
2010–11	Universitatea Craiova	Liga I	15	3	3	1	—		18	4
2010–11	Khazar Lankaran	Azerbaijan Premier League	11	2	5	1	0	0	16	4
2011–12	Khazar Lankaran	Azerbaijan Premier League	8	3	0	0	2	0	10	3
2011–12	Al-Masry	Egyptian Premier League	0	0	0	0	0	0	0	0
2012–13	Neftchi Baku	Azerbaijan Premier League	31	8	5	0	12	4	48	12
2013–14	Neftchi Baku	Azerbaijan Premier League	0	0	0	0	2	0	2	0
2013–14	Al Shaab (loan)	UAE Arabian Gulf League	12	1	3	1	—		15	2
2014–15	Neftchi Baku	Azerbaijan Premier League	27	7	5	1	6	1	38	9
2015–16	Olimpija Ljubljana	Slovenian PrvaLiga	12	2	0	0	0	0	12	2
2016–17	Olimpija Ljubljana	Slovenian PrvaLiga	21	1	4	1	2	0	27	2
Total	Cyprus		78	28					78	28
Total	Romania		102	12	9	1	0	0	111	13
Total	Azerbaijan		77	20	15	2	22	5	114	27
Total	Egypt		0	0	0	0	0	0	0	0
Total	UAE		12	1	3	1	0	0	15	2
Total	Slovenia		33	3	4	1	2	0	39	4
Total			302	64	28	4	24	5	354	73

=== International goals ===
Scores and results list Sierra Leone's goal tally first.

No	Date	Venue	Opponent	Score	Result	Competition
1.	24 March 2007	Stade de Kégué, Lomé, Togo	Togo	1–2	1–3	2008 Africa Cup of Nations qualification
2.	10 June 2017	National Stadium, Freetown, Sierra Leone	Kenya	1–0	2–1	2019 Africa Cup of Nations qualification

== Honours ==
Khazar Lankaran

- Azerbaijan Cup: 2010–11

Neftchi Baku

- Azerbaijan Premier League: 2012–13
- Azerbaijan Cup: 2012–13

Olimpija Ljubljana

- Slovenian First League: 2015–16
