= Alim Qurbanov =

Azerbaijani footballer (born 1977)

Personal information
- Date of birth: 5 December 1977 (age 48)
- Place of birth: Baku, Azerbaijani SSR, Soviet Union
- Height: 1.77 m (5 ft 10 in)
- Position: Midfielder

Senior career*
Years	Team	Apps	(Gls)
1996–1997	Police Academy	23	(2)
1997–1998	MOIK Baku	24	(5)
1999–2001	Qarabağ	46	(2)
2001–2003	Neftchi Baku	9	(0)
2003–2004	Shamkir	9	(1)
2004–2012	Khazar Lankaran	131	(11)
2009	→ Karvan (loan)	6	(0)

International career^{‡}
1998–2007	Azerbaijan	10	(1)
- * Club domestic league appearances and goals as of 20 March 2020 ‡ National team caps and goals as of 15 July 2011

Alim Qurbanov (born 5 December 1977) is a retired Azerbaijani footballer who spent most of his career playing for club Khazar Lankaran as a midfielder.

== National team statistics ==
Azerbaijan national team
Year	Apps	Goals
1998	1	0
2005	3	1
2007	6	0
Total	10	1

=== International goals ===
#	Date	Venue	Opponent	Score	Result	Competition
1.	29 May 2005	Azadi Stadium, Tehran, Iran	Iran	2–1	Win	Friendly
Correct as of 3 June 2012
