= Enyo Krastovchev =

Bulgarian footballer

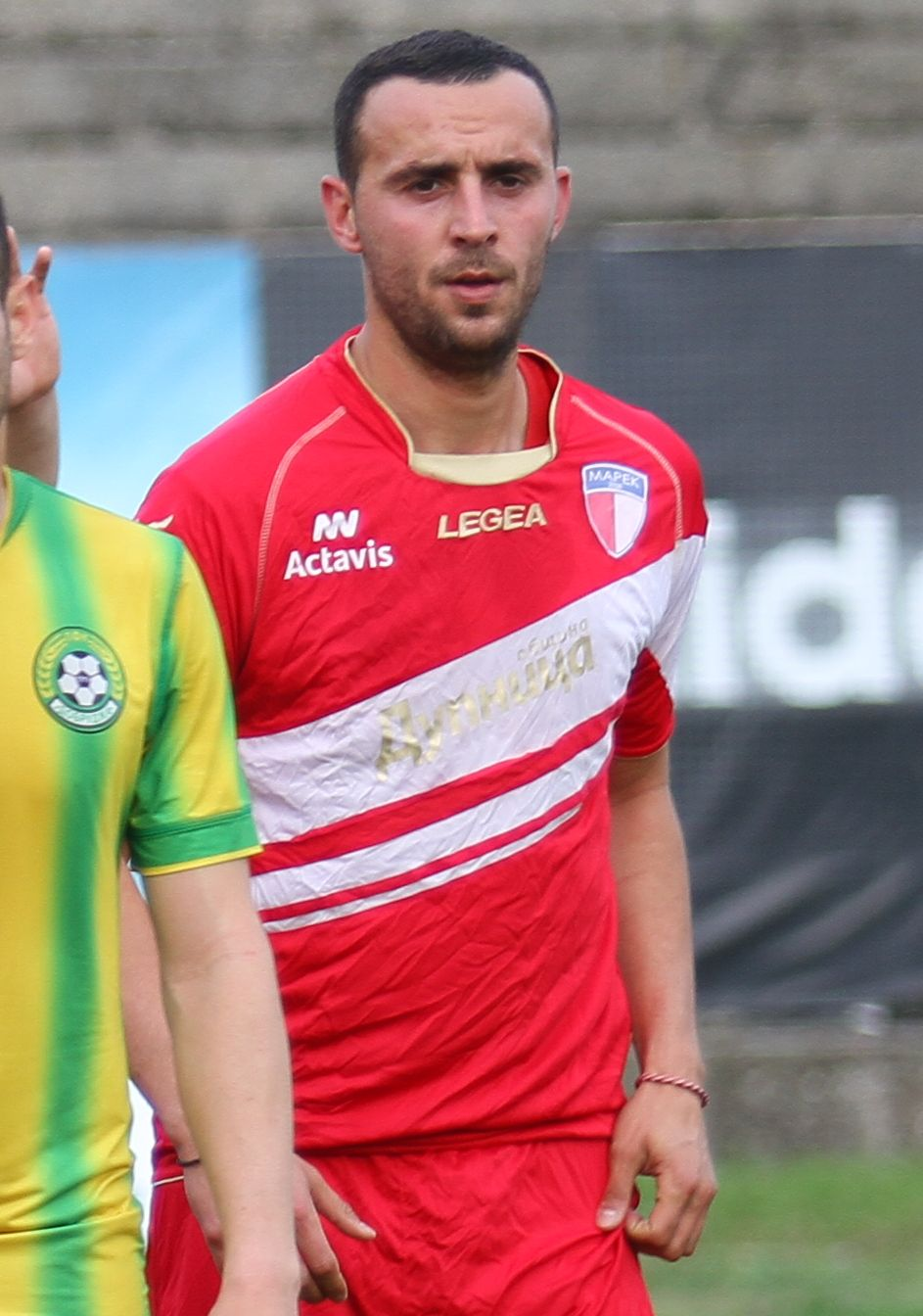

Personal information
- Full name: Enyo Emilov Krastovchev
- Date of birth: 7 February 1984 (age 42)
- Place of birth: Dupnitsa, Bulgaria
- Height: 1.87 m (6 ft 2 in)
- Position: Striker

Youth career
- Marek Dupnitsa

Senior career*
Years	Team	Apps	(Gls)
2002–2008	Marek Dupnitsa	82	(27)
2008–2010	Levski Sofia	28	(11)
2010–2011	AZAL Baku	13	(2)
2011–2012	Inter Baku	15	(1)
2013	Spartak Varna	7	(1)
2013–2015	Marek Dupnitsa	36	(7)
2015–2016	Kalamata		
2016–2019	Marek Dupnitsa		
2020	Rilski Sportist		
- * Club domestic league appearances and goals as of 27 May 2015

Enyo Krastovchev (Bulgarian: Еньо Кръстовчев; born 7 February 1984) is a retired Bulgarian footballer who played as a striker.

== Career ==
=== Marek Dupnitsa ===
Krastovchev was raised in Marek Dupnitsa's youth teams. He made his official debut in A PFG at the age of 18 in 2002. In July 2006 Krastovchev was training with Litex Lovech, but then he decided to return to Dupnitsa. Between 2002 and 2008, he played 90 matches and scored 19 goals for Marek. He returned to his hometown club in 2013, but left in July 2018.

=== Levski Sofia ===
On 19 February 2008, Krastovchev joined Levski Sofia on trial. The next day, he played one half-time for Levski in a friendly match against Vidima-Rakovski Sevlievo. On 26 February 2008, he signed a contract with the team.

He made his official debut for Levski on 2 March 2008 in a match against Vihren Sandanski, in which he also scored his first goal for the team.

On 9 April 2007, Krastovchev scored all four goals for Levski in a 4–0 win against his former team Marek Dupnitsa.

In the 2009–10 season, Krastovchev scored his first goal of the season on 8 August 2009 against Botev Plovdiv in a 5–0 home win. Due to Georgi Hristov's bad patch of form over a number of games, Krastovchev gradually managed to establish himself as the first choice forward for Levski, scoring a number of important goals, including a goal in the 3–2 away win against Sportist Svoge.

== Club career statistics ==
This statistic includes domestic league, domestic cup and European tournaments.

Season	Team	Division	Apps	Goals
2009–10	PFC Levski Sofia	1	15	4
2008–09	PFC Levski Sofia	1	4	0
2007–08	PFC Levski Sofia	1	15	7
2007–08	PFC Marek Dupnitsa	1	14	2
2006–07	PFC Marek Dupnitsa	1	25	6
2005–06	PFC Marek Dupnitsa	1	12	3
2004–05	PFC Marek Dupnitsa	1	9	0
2003–04	PFC Marek Dupnitsa	1	22	7
2002–03	PFC Marek Dupnitsa	1	8	1

== Awards ==
- Champion of Bulgaria 2009
