= Andrei Mureșan =

Romanian footballer

Personal information
- Full name: Andrei Iosif Mureșan
- Date of birth: 1 August 1985 (age 41)
- Place of birth: Turda, Romania
- Height: 1.89 m (6 ft 2 in)
- Position: Centre back

Youth career
- Universitatea Cluj
- –2003: Rapid București

Senior career*
Years	Team	Apps	(Gls)
2001–2007	Universitatea Cluj	78	(7)
2008–2010	Gloria Bistrița	58	(5)
2009	→ Kuban Krasnodar (loan)	7	(0)
2011–2012	Khazar Lankaran	41	(1)
2012–2014	Astra Giurgiu	38	(1)
2014–2015	Sheriff Tiraspol	18	(1)
2015–2020	CFR Cluj	106	(4)
2020	Universitatea Cluj	10	(0)
Total		356	(19)

International career
2001–2002	Romania U17	2	(0)
2003–2004	Romania U19	6	(0)
- * Club domestic league appearances and goals

Andrei Iosif Mureșan (born 1 August 1985) is a Romanian former professional footballer who played as a centre back. His father, Iosif Mureșan was also a footballer who played in the first two leagues for Universitatea Cluj.

== Honours ==
Universitatea Cluj

- Liga II: 2006–07

Khazar Lankaran

- Azerbaijan Cup: 2010–11

Astra Giurgiu

- Cupa României: 2013–14

Sheriff Tiraspol

- Moldovan Cup : 2014–15

CFR Cluj

- Liga I: 2017–18, 2018–19, 2019–20
- Cupa României: 2015–16
- Supercupa României: 2018
