= Ibrahima Bangoura =

Guinean footballer (born in 1982)

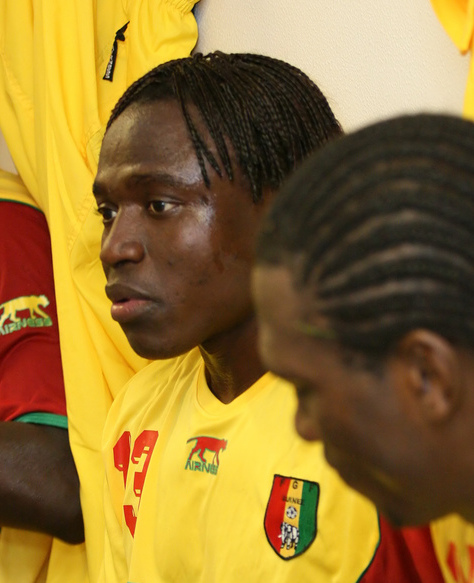

Personal information
- Full name: Ibrahima Sory Bangoura
- Date of birth: December 8, 1982 (age 43)
- Place of birth: Conakry, Guinea
- Height: 1.80 m (5 ft 11 in)
- Positions: Right back; right midfielder

Youth career
- 1998–2000: FC Istres

Senior career*
Years	Team	Apps	(Gls)
2001	FC Istres	13	(1)
2002–2008	Troyes	108	(8)
2002	→ Wasquehal (loan)	12	(1)
2009–2010	Denizlispor	29	(3)
2010	Konyaspor	8	(0)
2011	Khazar Lankaran	5	(0)
2011–2012	Djoliba AC		
2012–2013	Iraklis	9	(1)
2013	CP Cacereño	0	(0)

International career^{‡}
2005–2015	Guinea	29	(1)
- * Club domestic league appearances and goals as of January 19, 2013 ‡ National team caps and goals as of December 15, 2015

Ibrahima Sory Bangoura (born 8 December 1982 in Conakry) is a Guinean footballer who plays in Guinea for Hafia FC.

Bangoura was a member of the Guinea squad for the 2006 African Nations Cup, where the team was eliminated in the quarter-finals. His cousin Ismaël Bangoura is also a footballer and a member of the team. His favourite position is second striker although he has played as winger or as an attacking midfielder. He is well known for his pace.

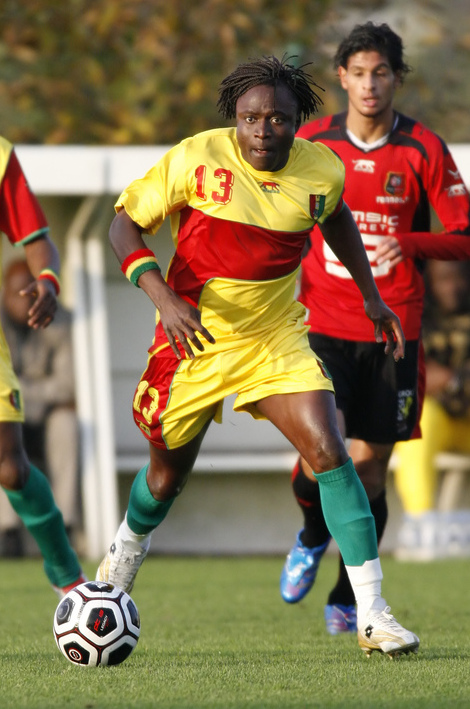
Bangoura as playing for Guinea (2006)

== Club career ==
On 25 January 2009 Bangoura signed a five-year-contract with Denizlispor. The transfer fee was estimated to be around €300,000. Ibrahima quickly became a fan favourite, and established himself as a talented goal scorer. Bangoura's other notable feature is his goal celebration, which he performs with teammate and Senegalese international defender Pape Diakhate, it resembles an African dance.

In 2010, he moved to Konyaspor.

In February 2011 Bangoura signed a two-year contract with Khazar Lankaran. After only three months Bangoura was released by Khazar Lankaran.

After leaving Khazar, Bangoura joined Djoliba AC Malian Première Division. In September 2013 Bangoura joined CP Cacereño, but left the club in December 2013 having not played for the club.
