= 2010–11 Azerbaijan Cup =

Tournament details
- Country: Azerbaijan
- Teams: 16

Final positions
- Champions: Khazar Lankaran
- Runners-up: Inter Baku

Tournament statistics
- Matches played: 29
- Goals scored: 59 (2.03 per match)
- Top goal scorer: Winston Parks (4)

The Azerbaijan Cup 2010–11 is the 19th season of the annual cup competition in Azerbaijan. It started on 26 October 2010 with four games of the Premiliary Round and will end in May 2011 with the final held at Tofik Bakhramov Stadium in Baku. FK Baku are the defending champions. Twenty-two teams are scheduled to compete in this year's competition. The winners will receive a berth in the second qualifying round of the 2011–12 UEFA Europa League.

== Preliminary round ==
Twelve lower division teams qualified for this competition played against each other over one leg. The winners of these matches joined the ten teams of the Azerbaijan Premier League 2009–10 in the next round. The draw was held on 15 October 2010 and the games were played on 26 and 27 October 2010.

Team 1	Score	Team 2
Karvan	1–1 (p. 3–4)	MKT Araz
Bakili	0–1	Neftchi ISM
ANSAD Petrol	0–2	Şuşa
Şəmkir	1–3	Ravan Baku
Şahdag Qusar	0–3	Ganca
FC Absheron	4–0	MOIK Baku

== First round ==
The six winners from the preliminary round joined ten teams of the 2010–11 Azerbaijan Premier League in this round and played against each other over one game. The games were played on 7 and 8 December 2010.

Team 1	Score	Team 2
Qarabağ	0–0 (p. 3–4)	Turan
Ganja	1–3	Neftchi Baku
Gabala	2–0	Neftchi ISM
Simurq	1–1 (p. 2–5)	FC Absheron
Ravan Baku	0–2	AZAL Baku
FK Baku	1–1 (p. 5–3)	Mughan
Khazar Lankaran	3–1	MKT Araz
Şuşa	1–4	Inter Baku

== Quarterfinals ==
The eight winners from the first round were drawn into four two-legged ties. The first legs were played on 2 and 3 March 2011, while the second legs were played on 8 and 9 March 2011.

Team 1	Agg.	Team 2	1st leg	2nd leg
AZAL Baku	3–1	Turan	2–0	1–1
Neftchi Baku	4–5	Khazar Lankaran	3–4	1–1
Gabala	0–1	FK Baku	0–0	0–1
FC Absheron	0–1	Inter Baku	0–1	0–0

== Semifinals ==
The four quarterfinal winners were drawn into two two-legged semifinal ties. The first legs were played on 27 April 2011, while the second legs were competed on 4 May 2011.

Team 1	Agg.	Team 2	1st leg	2nd leg
Khazar Lankaran	2–2(a)	FK Baku	1–0	1–2
Inter Baku	1–0	AZAL Baku	0–0	1–0

== Final ==
The two semifinals winners participated in this stage of the competition.

24 May 2011
20:00 AZST

Inter Baku	1–1 (a.e.t.)	Khazar Lankaran
Karlsons 100'	Summary	91' Parks
Penalties
	2–4

Tofiq Bahramov Stadium, Baku
Attendance: 10,000
Referee: Fariz Yusifov

== Scorers ==
4 goals:

- Winston Parks, Khazar Lankaran

3 goals:

- Flavinho, Neftchi Baku
- Ģirts Karlsons, Inter Baku

2 goals:

- Mehtiyev, Absheron
- Eleandro Pema, AZAL
- Jeyhun Sultanov, Ganja
- Rovshan Amiraslanov, Inter Baku

1 goals:

- Zahid Quliyev, Absheron
- Mammadov, Absheron
- Qafittulin, Absheron
- Nugzar Kvirtiya, AZAL
- Gvidas Juska, AZAL
- Agil Nabiyev, AZAL
- Leo Rocha, Baku
- Jabá, Baku
- Fábio Luís Ramim, Baku
- Saša Kajkut, Baku
- Ljubo Baranin, Gabala
- Bruno Anjos, Gabala
- Samir Zargarov, Ganja
- Guy Feutchine, Ganja
- David Odikadze, Inter Baku
- Robertas Poškus, Inter Baku
- Ağayev, Karvan
- Rahid Amirguliyev, Khazar Lankaran
- Adrian Scarlatache, Khazar Lankaran
- Julius Wobay, Khazar Lankaran
- Andrei Mureșan, Khazar Lankaran
- Allan Lalín, Khazar Lankaran
- Amid Huseynov, Khazar Lankaran
- Ramazan Abbasov, Khazar Lankaran
- Huseyn Aliyev, MKT Araz
- Koçaliyev, MKT Araz
- Elnur Abdullayev, Mughan
- Slavčo Georgievski, Neftchi Baku
- Javid Imamverdiyev, Neftchi Baku
- Rashad Abdullayev, Neftchi Baku
- Mirhuseyn Seyidov, Neftchi Baku
- İsgandarov, Neftchi ISM
- Rashad Mammadov, Ravan Baku
- Fakhraddin Murvatov, Ravan Baku
- Elnur Huseynov, Ravan Baku
- Rashad Mammadov, Ravan Baku
- Hacıyev, Şəmkir
- Vasif Äliyev, Simurq
- Rauf Mamishov, Şuşa
- Şahbazov, Şuşa
- Ələsov, Şuşa
- Boris Kondev, Turan Tovuz
