= 2009–10 FK Baku season =

Baku
2009–10 season
- President: Hafiz Mammadov
- Manager: Gjoko Hadžievski until 24 September 2009; Bülent Korkmaz; 25 September 2009 – 22 March 2010; Cüneyt Biçer from 3 April 2010
- Stadium: Tofig Bakhramov Stadium
- Premier League: 2nd
- Azerbaijan Cup: Winners
- UEFA Champions League: Third qualifying round vs Levski Sofia
- UEFA Europa League: Play-off round vs Basel
- Top goalscorer: League: Jabá (10); All: Jabá (12)
- Highest home attendance: 20,000 vs FK Ekranas; 21 July 2009
- Lowest home attendance: 100 vs Standard; 23 September 2009
- Average home league attendance: 2,572
Home colours	Away colours	Third colours

== Squad ==
Note: Flags indicate national team as defined under FIFA eligibility rules; some limited exceptions apply. Players may hold more than one non-FIFA nationality.

No.	Pos.	Nation	Player
1	GK	CRO	Marko Šarlija
3	DF	AZE	Rafael Amirbekov
4	MF	MDA	Vadim Boret
5	DF	SRB	Stevan Bates
6	DF	TUR	Kürşat Duymuş
7	MF	AZE	Mahmud Qurbanov
8	MF	CRO	Ernad Skulić
11	MF	MAR	Adnan Barakat
12	FW	MDA	Veaceslav Sofroni
14	DF	AZE	Elvin Aliyev
13	GK	AZE	Aqil Mammadov
15	MF	AZE	Jamshid Maharramov
16	DF	AZE	Haji Ahmadov
17	DF	AZE	Rahman Hajiyev
18	DF	AZE	Elshad Manafov
19	FW	NGR	Ahmad Tijani
20	MF	AZE	Fábio
21	MF	BRA	Wênio

No.	Pos.	Nation	Player
22	DF	AZE	Sabuhi Hasanov
23	GK	SEN	Khalidou Sissokho
24	FW	AZE	Tural Gurbatov
25	DF	AZE	Shahriyar Aliyev
27	MF	AZE	Bakhtiyar Soltanov
29	DF	AZE	Aziz Guliyev
30	DF	AZE	Fariz Mammadov
32	DF	MDA	Alexei Savinov
33	DF	AZE	Saşa Yunisoğlu
34	FW	BRA	Adriano
35	MF	AZE	Kiril Bejonar
41	MF	AZE	Orkhan Bashirli
44	MF	AZE	Nijad Gozalov
55	FW	KEN	Allan Wanga
77	MF	CRO	Aleksandar Šolić
85	FW	BRA	Jabá
99	MF	AZE	Nijat Abdullayev

=== On Loan ===
Note: Flags indicate national team as defined under FIFA eligibility rules; some limited exceptions apply. Players may hold more than one non-FIFA nationality.

No.	Pos.	Nation	Player
29	MF	ROU	Cristian Muscalu (loan to Chernomorets Burgas), second half of the season

== Transfers ==
=== Summer ===
In: Note: Flags indicate national team as defined under FIFA eligibility rules; some limited exceptions apply. Players may hold more than one non-FIFA nationality.

No.	Pos.	Nation	Player
2	DF	BRA	Rafael Barbosa (from (Brazil) Volta Redonda)
5	DF	SRB	Stevan Bates (from (France) LB Châteauroux)
6	DF	ROU	Mihai Panc (from (Romania) Gloria Bistriţa)
11	FW	ROU	Daniel Opriţa (from (Spain) Lorca Deportiva)
16	DF	AZE	Haji Ahmadov (from youth team)
17	DF	AZE	Rahman Hajiyev (from youth team)
29	MF	ROU	Cristian Muscalu (from (Bosnia and Herzegovina) FK Slavija)
33	DF	AZE	Saşa Yunisoğlu (from (Poland) Polonia Warsaw)
77	MF	CRO	Aleksandar Šolić (from (Croatia) NK Osijek)
85	FW	BRA	Jabá (from (Turkey) Ankaragücü)

Out: Note: Flags indicate national team as defined under FIFA eligibility rules; some limited exceptions apply. Players may hold more than one non-FIFA nationality.

No.	Pos.	Nation	Player
2	DF	BRA	Rafael Barbosa (released, joined (Bulgaria) Slavia Sofia)
9	FW	BRA	Felipe (loan return to (Russia) Spartak Nalchik)
11	FW	ROU	Daniel Opriţa (released, joined (Romania) Petrolul Ploieşti)
18	DF	BDI	Floribert Ndayisaba (to (Burundi) Fantastique Bujumbura)
30	FW	BRA	William Batista (loan return to (Ukraine) FC Kharkiv)
12	FW	ARG	Fernando Pérez (released)
17	MF	AZE	Ramazan Abbasov (to (Azerbaijan) Khazar Lankaran)
99	FW	MAR	Hassan Souari (to (United Arab Emirates) Hatta Club)

=== Winter ===
In: Note: Flags indicate national team as defined under FIFA eligibility rules; some limited exceptions apply. Players may hold more than one non-FIFA nationality.

No.	Pos.	Nation	Player
6	DF	TUR	Kürşat Duymuş (from (Turkey) Kartalspor)
11	FW	MAR	Adnan Barakat (from (Netherlands) Den Bosch)
12	FW	MDA	Veaceslav Sofroni (from (Moldova) Zimbru Chişinău)
21	MF	BRA	Wênio (from (Portugal) Leixões).
29	DF	AZE	Aziz Guliyev (from (Azerbaijan) FK Karvan)
34	FW	BRA	Adriano (from (Brazil) Paraná)
55	FW	KEN	Allan Wanga (from (Angola) Atlético Petróleos Luanda)

Out: Note: Flags indicate national team as defined under FIFA eligibility rules; some limited exceptions apply. Players may hold more than one non-FIFA nationality.

No.	Pos.	Nation	Player
6	DF	ROU	Mihai Panc (to (Romania) CSMS Iaşi)
10	MF	GEO	Amiran Mujiri (to (Azerbaijan) Standard Sumgayit)
21	DF	BUL	Aleksandar Tomash (to (Bulgaria) Slavia Sofia)
22	MF	AZE	Orkhan Safiyaroglu (to (Azerbaijan) AZAL)
29	MF	ROU	Cristian Muscalu (loan to (Bulgaria) Chernomorets Burgas)
55	FW	GEO	Giorgi Adamia (to (Azerbaijan) Qarabağ)

== Competitions ==
=== Azerbaijan Premier League ===
==== Results ====
16 September 2009 1	Khazar Lankaran	Postponed after 11mins	Baku	Lankaran
17:00 AZST (UTC+5)		Summary		Stadium: Lankaran City Stadium

12 September 2009 4	Baku	1–2	Simurq	Baku
18:00 AZST (UTC+5)	Šolić 65'	Summary	Mammadov 54'; Hunchak 75'	Stadium: Tofig Bakhramov Stadium; Attendance: 500; Referee: Fariz Yusifov

20 September 2009 5	Olimpik-Shuvalan	0–1	Baku	Baku
18:00 AZST (UTC+5)		Summary	Skulić 63'	Stadium: Shafa Stadium; Attendance: 400; Referee: Vusal Aliyev

23 September 2009 2	Baku	0–0	Standard Sumgayit	Baku
16:15 AZST (UTC+5)		Summary		Stadium: Tofig Bakhramov Stadium; Attendance: 100; Referee: Afgan Hamzayev

26 September 2009 6	Baku	0–1	Qarabağ	Baku
17:10 AZST (UTC+5)		Summary	Kerimov 80'	Stadium: Tofig Bakhramov Stadium; Attendance: 400; Referee: Rovshan Ahmadov

17 October 2009 7	Turan Tovuz	0–1	Baku	Tovuz
16:00 AZST (UTC+5)		Summary	Jabá 42'	Stadium: Tovuz City Stadium; Attendance: 2,000; Referee: Anar Salmanov

22 October 2009 3	Inter Baku	1–0	Baku	Baku
17:10 AZST (UTC+5)	Leo Rocha 32'	Summary		Stadium: Shafa Stadium; Attendance: 1,000; Referee: Vusal Aliyev

25 October 2009 8	Baku	0–2	Neftchi Baku	Baku
16:10 AZST (UTC+5)		Summary	Neaga 73'; Aliuță 88'	Stadium: Tofig Bakhramov Stadium; Attendance: 300; Referee: Anar Salmanov

31 October 2009 9	Gabala	0–2	Baku	Qabala
14:00 AZST (UTC+5)		Summary	Savinov 40'; Šolić 76'	Stadium: Gabala City Stadium; Attendance: 1,500; Referee: Rovshan Ahmadov

7 November 2009 10	Baku	1–0	FK Karvan	Baku
14:00 AZT (UTC+4)	Jabá 83'	Summary		Stadium: Tofig Bakhramov Stadium; Attendance: 600; Referee: Azad Mutallimov

22 November 2009 11	FK Mughan	0–1	Baku	Salyan
14:00 AZT (UTC+4)		Summary	Jabá 90'	Stadium: Salyan Olympic Sport Complex Stadium; Attendance: 400; Referee: Rasim Mämmädov

25 November 2009 1	Khazar Lankaran	1–1	Baku	Lankaran
17:00 AZT (UTC+4)	Mario Sergio 52'	Summary	Tijani 44'	Stadium: Lankaran City Stadium; Attendance: 8,000; Referee: Anar Salmanov

29 November 2009 12	Baku	0–3	Khazar Lankaran	Baku
14:15 AZT (UTC+4)		Summary	Tsvetkov 57' (pen.), 90+2'; Mario Sergio 90+1'	Stadium: Tofig Bakhramov Stadium; Attendance: 2,000; Referee: Afgan Hamzayev

5 December 2009 13	Standard Sumgayit	3–4	Baku	Sumgayit
14:00 AZT (UTC+4)	Hugo Machado 36' (pen.), 41'; Requelme 90+3'	Summary	Soltanov 9', 68'; Jabá 21'; Šolić 85'	Stadium: Mehdi Huseynzade Stadium; Attendance: 500; Referee: Fariz Yusifov

9 December 2009 14	Baku	2–0	Inter Baku	Baku
14:15 AZT (UTC+4)	Jabá 62'; Skulić 79'	Summary		Stadium: Tofig Bakhramov Stadium; Attendance: 200; Referee: Anar Salmanov

13 December 2009 15	Simurq	1–2	Baku	Zaqatala
18:00 AZT (UTC+4)	Hunchak 45' (pen.)	Summary	Fábio 5'; Šolić 65'	Stadium: Zaqatala City Stadium; Attendance: 3,050; Referee: Azer Hamzayev

20 December 2009 16	Baku	0–0	Olimpik-Shuvalan	Baku
14:00 AZT (UTC+4)		Summary		Stadium: Tofig Bakhramov Stadium; Attendance: 200; Referee: Elchin Mämmädov

24 December 2009 17	Qarabağ	0–0	Baku	Baku^{2}
14:15 AZT (UTC+4)		Summary		Stadium: Tofiq Bahramov Stadium; Attendance: 2,000; Referee: Rasim Mämmädov

2 February 2010 18	Baku	2–1	Turan Tovuz	Baku
14:00 AZT (UTC+4)	Jabá 44'; Duymuş 76'	Summary	Hasanov 60'	Stadium: Tofig Bakhramov Stadium; Attendance: 500; Referee: Ramil Diniyev

9 February 2010 19	Neftchi Baku	1–1	Baku	Baku
15:00 AZT (UTC+4)	Neaga 38' (pen.)	Summary	Jabá 24'	Stadium: Tofik Bakhramov Stadium; Attendance: 300; Referee: Vusal Aliyev

13 February 2010 20	Baku	2–0	Gabala	Baku
14:00 AZT (UTC+4)	Duymuş 35'; Adriano 90+2'	Summary		Stadium: Tofig Bakhramov Stadium; Attendance: 500; Referee: Fariz Yusifov

17 February 2010 21	FK Karvan	1–1	Baku	Yevlakh
14:00 AZT (UTC+4)	Mammadov 57'	Summary	Fábio 21'	Stadium: Yevlakh Stadium; Attendance: 400; Referee: Rauf Jabbarov

20 February 2010 22	Baku	0–0	FK Mughan	Baku
14:15 AZT (UTC+4)		[ Summary]		Stadium: Tofig Bakhramov Stadium; Attendance: 500; Referee: Ramil Diniyev

==== League table ====
Pos	Team	Pld	W	D	L	GF	GA	GD	Pts	Qualification
2	Khazar Lankaran	22	12	8	2	29	11	+18	44	Qualification for championship group
3	Qarabağ	22	11	9	2	21	12	+9	42	Qualification for championship group
4	Baku	22	10	7	5	22	17	+5	37	Qualification for championship group
5	Gabala	22	10	6	6	24	21	+3	36	Qualification for championship group
6	Neftçi Baku	22	9	8	5	20	14	+6	35	Qualification for championship group

Source: Soccerway.com
Rules for classification: 1) points; 2) goal difference; 3) number of goals scored.

=== Azerbaijan Premier League Championship Group ===
==== Results ====
12 March 2010 23	Baku	2–0	Qarabağ	Baku
14:00 AZT (UTC+4)	Jabá 56'; Fábio 76'	Summary		Stadium: Tofig Bakhramov Stadium; Attendance: 500; Referee: Anar Salmanov

21 March 2010 24	Neftchi Baku	1–0	Baku	Baku
15:00 AZT (UTC+4)	Neaga 13'	Summary		Stadium: Ismat Gayibov Stadium; Attendance: 1,500; Referee: Rovshan Ahmadov

28 March 2010 25	Baku	1–1	Gabala	Baku
16:00 AZST (UTC+5)	Šolić 21'	Summary	Pashayev 78'	Stadium: Tofig Bakhramov Stadium; Attendance: 700; Referee: Anar Salmanov

4 April 2010 26	Inter Baku	1–1	Baku	Baku
16:00 AZST (UTC+5)	Yunisoğlu 17' (o.g.)	Summary	Jabá 1'	Stadium: Shafa Stadium; Attendance: 2,000; Referee: Fariz Yusifov

11 April 2010 27	Baku	1–0	Khazar Lankaran	Baku
16:10 AZST (UTC+5)	Fábio 89'	Summary		Stadium: Tofig Bakhramov Stadium; Attendance: 3,000; Referee: Elchin Mämmädov

17 April 2010 28	Qarabağ	1–4	Baku	Baku^{2}
16:00 AZST (UTC+5)	Ismayilov 57'	Summary	Sofroni 6'; Jabá 42'; Šolić 82'; Wênio 88'	Stadium: Tofiq Bahramov Stadium; Attendance: 2,000; Referee: Anar Salmanov

23 April 2010 29	Baku	1–1	Neftchi Baku	Baku
17:15 AZST (UTC+5)	Skulić 14'; Wênio (red card) 51'	Summary	Voskoboinikov 87'	Stadium: Tofig Bakhramov Stadium; Attendance: 700; Referee: Elchin Mämmädov

1 May 2010 30	Gabala	1–0	Baku	Qabala
17:15 AZST (UTC+5)	Lopes Tavares 72'	Summary		Stadium: Gabala City Stadium; Attendance: 2,000; Referee: Fariz Yusifov

9 May 2010 31	Baku	0–0	Inter Baku	Baku
17:15 AZST (UTC+5)		Summary		Stadium: Tofig Bakhramov Stadium; Attendance: 1,500; Referee: Fariz Yusifov

15 May 2010 32	Khazar Lankaran	0–1	Baku	Lankaran
17:15 AZST (UTC+5)		Summary	Šolić 28'	Stadium: Lankaran City Stadium; Attendance: 16,000; Referee: Vusal Aliyev

==== Table ====
Pos	Team	Pld	W	D	L	GF	GA	GD	Pts	Qualification
1	Inter Baku (C)	20	7	8	5	22	19	+3	29	Qualification for Champions League second qualifying round
2	Baku	20	7	7	6	19	15	+4	28	Qualification for Europa League second qualifying round (Note: Baku were the winners of the 2009–10 Azerbaijan Cup competition and qualified for the second qualifying round of the UEFA Europa League.)
3	Qarabağ	20	6	9	5	16	18	−2	27 (Note: QAR: 7 pts, 4–3; KHA: 4 pts, 3–4)	Qualification for Europa League first qualifying round
4	Khazar Lankaran	20	6	9	5	19	14	+5	27	Qualification for Europa League first qualifying round
5	Neftçi Baku	20	4	11	5	11	12	−1	23	

Source: Soccerway.com
Rules for classification: 1) points; 2) head-to-head points; 3) head-to-head goal difference; 4) head-to-head goals scored; 5) goal difference; 6) number of goals scored.
(C) Champions

=== Azerbaijan Cup ===
4 November 2009 Last 16 1st Leg	Baku	6–0	Bakili Baku	Baku
15:00 AZT (UTC+4)	Felipe 18', 20'; Tijani 33'; Mujiri 53'; N.Abdullayev 74'; O.Bashirli 76'	Summary; Report		Stadium: Tofig Bakhramov Stadium

11 November 2009 Last 16 2nd Leg	Bakili Baku	0–0 (0–6 agg.)	Baku	Baku
13:30 AZT (UTC+4)		Summary; Report		Stadium: Shafa Stadium (IV field); Attendance: 100; Referee: Alik Yunusov

7 March 2010 Quarter-Final 1st Leg	Baku	1–1	Standard Sumgayit	Baku
17:00 AZT (UTC+4)	Fábio 59'	Summary	Mujiri 89'	Stadium: Tofig Bakhramov Stadium; Attendance: 300; Referee: Afgan Hamzayev

17 March 2010 Quarter-Final 2nd Leg	Standard Sumgayit	1–3 (2–4 agg.)	Baku	Sumgayit
15:00 AZT (UTC+4)	Guliyev 81'	Summary	Jabá 14'; Šolić 24', 79'	Stadium: Mehdi Huseynzade Stadium; Attendance: 500; Referee: Elchin Mämmädov

27 April 2010 Semi-final 1st Leg	Baku	0–1	Inter Baku	Baku
18:00 AZST (UTC+5)		Summary	Mammadov 61'	Stadium: Tofig Bakhramov Stadium; Attendance: 300; Referee: Vusal Aliyev

5 May 2010 Semi-final 2nd Leg	Inter Baku	1–3 (2–3 agg.)	Baku	Baku
AZST (UTC+5)	Gutiérrez 51'	Summary	Sofroni 27'; Jabá 56'; Zagorac 66' (o.g.); Boret (yellow card) 59' (yellow-red card) 72'	Stadium: Shafa Stadium; Attendance: 3,500; Referee: Afgan Hamzayev

23 May 2010 Final	Baku	2–1 (a.e.t.)	Khazar Lankaran	Baku
20:00 AZST (UTC+5)	Skulić 100'; Šolić 104'	Summary	Beqiri 120'	Stadium: Tofig Bakhramov Stadium; Attendance: 26,000; Referee: Elchin Mämmädov

=== UEFA Champions League ===
==== Qualifying stages ====
14 July 2009 2nd qualifying round 1st leg	Ekranas (Lithuania)	2–2	(Azerbaijan) Baku	Panevėžys, Lithuania
23:00 AZST (UTC+5)	Bička 53' (pen.); Trakys 90+3'	Summary	Felipe Almeida 78'; Rocha Batista 90+1'	Stadium: Aukštaitija Stadium; Attendance: 3,200; Referee: Sascha Kever (Switzerland)

21 July 2009 2nd qualifying round 2nd Leg	Baku (Azerbaijan)	4–2 (6–4 agg.)	(Lithuania) Ekranas	Baku, Azerbaijan
20:00 AZST (UTC+5)	Felipe Almeida 59', 77'; Mujiri 65'; Šolić 90+1'	Report	Matovič 81'; Gleveckas 90+2'	Stadium: Tofik Bakhramov Stadium; Attendance: 20,000; Referee: Serge Gumienny (Belgium)

28 July 2009 3rd qualifying round 1st Leg	Baku (Azerbaijan)	0–0	(Bulgaria) Levski Sofia	Baku, Azerbaijan
20:00 AZST (UTC+5)		Report		Stadium: Tofik Bakhramov Stadium; Attendance: 25,500; Referee: Svein Oddvar Moen (Norway)

5 August 2009 3rd qualifying round 2nd Leg	Levski Sofia (Bulgaria)	2–0 (2–0 agg.)	(Azerbaijan) Baku	Sofia, Bulgaria
22:30 AZST (UTC+5)	Yovov 64'; Hristov 80'	Report		Stadium: Georgi Asparuhov Stadium; Attendance: 13,500; Referee: Stefan Johannesson (Sweden)

=== UEFA Europa League ===
==== Play-off Round ====
20 August 2009 Play-off round 1st Leg	Baku (Azerbaijan)	1–3	(Switzerland) Basel	Baku, Azerbaijan
20:00 AZST (UTC+5)	Pérez 49'	Report	Streller 71', 74'; Huggel 77'	Stadium: Tofik Bakhramov Stadium; Attendance: 13,000; Referee: Zsolt Szabo (Hungary)

27 August 2009 Play-off round 2nd Leg	Basel (Switzerland)	5–1 (8–2 agg.)	(Azerbaijan) Baku	Basel, Switzerland
22:30 AZST (UTC+5)	Almerares 32'; Gelabert 36'; Frei 63'; Shaqiri 74'; Mustafi 84'	Report	Felipe 33'	Stadium: St. Jakob-Park; Attendance: 7,113; Referee: Hannes Kaasik (Estonia)

== Squad statistics ==
=== Appearances and goals ===
No.	Pos	Nat	Player	Total		Premier League		Azerbaijan Cup		Champions League		Europa League	
No.	Pos	Nat	Player	Apps	Goals	Apps	Goals	Apps	Goals	Apps	Goals	Apps	Goals
1	GK	(Croatia) CRO	Marko Šarlija	34	0	28+0	0	5+0	0	1+0	0	0+0	0
3	DF	(Azerbaijan) AZE	Rafael Amirbekov	6	0	1+1	0	2+1	0	0+0	0	1+0	0
4	DF	(Moldova) MDA	Vadim Boret	36	0	27+0	0	4+0	0	4+0	0	1+0	0
5	DF	(Serbia) SRB	Stevan Bates	31	0	21+0	0	4+0	0	4+0	0	2+0	0
6	DF	(Turkey) TUR	Kürşat Duymuş	12	2	10+0	2	2+0	0	0+0	0	0+0	0
7	MF	(Azerbaijan) AZE	Mahmud Qurbanov	20	0	2+9	0	3+2	0	1+2	0	0+1	0
8	MF	(Croatia) CRO	Ernad Skulić	38	3	26+3	2	4+0	1	4+0	0	1+0	0
11	MF	(Morocco) MAR	Adnan Barakat	13	0	9+1	0	3+0	0	0+0	0	0+0	0
12	FW	(Moldova) MDA	Veaceslav Sofroni	14	2	7+3	1	1+3	1	0+0	0	0+0	0
14	DF	(Azerbaijan) AZE	Elvin Aliyev	32	0	23+3	0	6+0	0	0+0	0	0+0	0
15	MF	(Azerbaijan) AZE	Jamshid Maharramov	25	0	11+9	0	4+0	0	0+0	0	1+0	0
16	DF	(Azerbaijan) AZE	Haji Ahmadov	5	0	1+2	0	0+2	0	0+0	0	0+0	0
17	DF	(Azerbaijan) AZE	Rahman Hajiyev	3	0	1+2	0	0+0	0	0+0	0	0+0	0
19	FW	(Nigeria) NGR	Ahmad Tijani	19	2	7+10	1	2+0	1	0+0	0	0+0	0
20	MF	(Azerbaijan) AZE	Fábio Luís Ramim	28	5	19+2	4	2+1	1	2+1	0	0+1	0
21	MF	(Brazil) BRA	Wênio	15	1	9+2	1	3+1	0	0+0	0	0+0	0
22	DF	(Azerbaijan) AZE	Sabuhi Hasanov	1	0	0+1	0	0+0	0	0+0	0	0+0	0
23	GK	(Senegal) SEN	Khalidou Sissokho	15	0	8+0	0	2+0	0	3+0	0	2+0	0
27	FW	(Azerbaijan) AZE	Bakhtiyar Soltanov	33	0	21+3	0	4+0	0	3+0	0	2+0	0
29	MF	(Azerbaijan) AZE	Aziz Guliyev	8	0	2+4	0	0+2	0	0+0	0	0+0	0
30		(Azerbaijan) AZE	Fariz Mammadov	1	0	0+0	0	0+1	0	0+0	0	0+0	0
32	DF	(Moldova) MDA	Alexei Savinov	28	1	18+1	1	4+0	0	4+0	0	1+0	0
33	DF	(Azerbaijan) AZE	Saşa Yunisoğlu	19	0	8+4	0	4+1	0	0+0	0	2+0	0
34	FW	(Brazil) BRA	Adriano	8	1	3+4	1	1+0	0	0+0	0	0+0	0
35	MF	(Azerbaijan) AZE	Kiril Bejonar	2	0	0+0	0	1+1	0	0+0	0	0+0	0
41	MF	(Azerbaijan) AZE	Orkhan Bashirli	2	1	0+0	0	1+1	1	0+0	0	0+0	0
55	FW	(Kenya) KEN	Allan Wanga	7	0	0+6	0	0+1	0	0+0	0	0+0	0
77	MF	(Croatia) CRO	Aleksandar Šolić	40	11	28+1	7	4+1	3	4+0	1	2+0	0
85	FW	(Brazil) BRA	Jabá	35	12	28+0	10	5+0	2	0+0	0	2+0	0
99	MF	(Azerbaijan) AZE	Nijat Abdullayev	2	1	0+0	0	0+2	1	0+0	0	0+0	0
Players who appeared for Baku who left on loan during the season:
29	DF	(Romania) ROU	Cristian Muscalu	2	0	0+1	0	1+0	0	0+0	0	0+0	0
Players who appeared for Baku who left during the season:
2	DF	(Brazil) BRA	Rafael Barbosa	5	0	0+1	0	0+0	0	4+0	0	0+0	0
6	DF	(Romania) ROU	Mihai Panc	10	0	8+2	0	0+0	0	0+0	0	0+0	0
9	FW	(Brazil) BRA	Felipe	13	6	3+3	0	2+0	2	4+0	3	1+0	1
10	MF	(Georgia (country)) GEO	Amiran Mujiri	16	2	3+6	0	1+0	1	2+2	1	1+1	0
11	FW	(Romania) ROU	Daniel Opriţa	3	0	2+1	0	0+0	0	0+0	0	0+0	0
12	FW	(Argentina) ARG	Fernando Pérez	6	1	1+0	0	0+0	0	2+1	0	2+0	1
21	DF	(Bulgaria) BUL	Aleksandar Tomash	10	0	3+4	0	2+0	0	0+0	0	1+0	0
30	FW	(Brazil) BRA	William Batista	3	1	0+0	0	0+0	0	0+3	1	0+0	0
55	FW	(Georgia (country)) GEO	Giorgi Adamia	22	0	14+2	0	0+0	0	2+2	0	0+2	0

=== Goal scorers ===
Place	Position	Nation	Number	Name	Premier League	Azerbaijan Cup	Champions League	Europa League	Total
1	FW	(Brazil)	85	Jabá	10	2	0	0	12
2	MF	(Croatia)	77	Aleksandar Šolić	7	3	1	0	11
3	FW	(Brazil)	9	Felipe	0	2	3	1	6
4	MF	(Azerbaijan)	20	Fábio Luís Ramim	4	1	0	0	5
5	MF	(Croatia)	8	Ernad Skulić	2	1	0	0	3
6	MF	(Azerbaijan)	27	Bakhtiyar Soltanov	2	0	0	0	2
6	DF	(Turkey)	6	Kürşat Duymuş	2	0	0	0	2
6	FW	(Moldova)	12	Veaceslav Sofroni	1	1	0	0	2
6	FW	(Nigeria)	19	Ahmad Tijani	1	1	0	0	2
6	MF	(Georgia (country))	10	Amiran Mujiri	0	1	1	0	2
11	MF	(Brazil)	21	Wênio	1	0	0	0	1
11	DF	(Moldova)	32	Alexei Savinov	1	0	0	0	1
11	FW	(Brazil)	34	Adriano	1	0	0	0	1
11	FW	(Brazil)	30	William Batista	0	0	1	0	1
11				Own goal	0	1	0	0	1
11	MF	(Azerbaijan)	99	Nijat Abdullayev	0	1	0	0	1
11	MF	(Azerbaijan)	41	Orkhan Bashirli	0	1	0	0	1
11	FW	(Argentina)	12	Fernando Pérez	0	0	0	1	1
				TOTALS	32	15	6	2	55

=== Disciplinary record ===
Number	Nation	Position	Name	Premier League		Azerbaijan Cup		Champions League		Total	
Number	Nation	Position	Name	Yellow card	Red card	Yellow card	Red card	Yellow card	Red card	Yellow card	Red card
1	(Croatia)	GK	Marko Šarlija	2	0	0	0	0	0	2	0
2	(Brazil)	DF	Rafael Barbosa	0	0	0	0	1	0	1	0
3	(Azerbaijan)	DF	Rafael Amirbekov	0	0	1	0	0	0	1	0
4	(Moldova)	DF	Vadim Boret	9	0	3	1	1	0	13	1
5	(Serbia)	DF	Stevan Bates	4	0	2	0	1	0	7	0
6	(Turkey)	DF	Kürşat Duymuş	2	0	1	0	0	0	3	0
7	(Azerbaijan)	MF	Mahmud Qurbanov	1	0	0	0	0	0	1	0
8	(Croatia)	MF	Ernad Skulić	6	0	1	0	1	0	8	0
9	(Brazil)	FW	Felipe	3	0	0	0	2	0	5	0
10	(Georgia (country))	MF	Amiran Mujiri	2	0	0	0	1	0	3	0
11	(Morocco)	MF	Adnan Barakat	1	0	0	0	0	0	1	0
12	(Moldova)	FW	Veaceslav Sofroni	4	0	1	0	0	0	5	0
14	(Azerbaijan)	DF	Elvin Aliyev	7	0	2	0	0	0	9	0
15	(Azerbaijan)	MF	Jamshid Maharramov	6	0	1	0	0	0	7	0
16	(Azerbaijan)	DF	Haji Ahmadov	1	0	0	0	0	0	1	0
19	(Nigeria)	FW	Ahmad Tijani	1	0	0	0	0	0	1	0
20	(Azerbaijan)	MF	Fábio Luís Ramim	5	0	1	0	0	0	6	0
21	(Bulgaria)	DF	Aleksandar Tomash	1	0	0	0	0	0	1	0
21	(Brazil)	MF	Wênio	4	1	0	0	0	0	4	1
22	(Azerbaijan)	DF	Sabuhi Hasanov	1	0	0	0	0	0	1	0
23	(Senegal)	GK	Khalidou Sissokho	1	0	0	0	2	0	3	0
27	(Azerbaijan)	FW	Bakhtiyar Soltanov	1	0	0	0	2	0	3	0
29	(Azerbaijan)	DF	Aziz Guliyev	1	0	1	0	0	0	2	0
32	(Moldova)	DF	Alexei Savinov	5	0	1	0	0	0	6	0
33	(Azerbaijan)	DF	Saşa Yunisoğlu	2	0	0	0	0	0	2	0
55	(Georgia (country))	FW	Giorgi Adamia	2	0	0	0	1	0	3	0
77	(Croatia)	MF	Aleksandar Šolić	5	0	1	0	1	0	7	0
85	(Brazil)	FW	Jabá	4	0	2	0	0	0	6	0
			TOTALS	81	1	18	1	13	0	112	2
