= List of Azerbaijan football transfers winter 2010 =

This is a list of Azerbaijan football transfers in the winter transfer window 2010 by club. Only clubs of the 2009–10 Azerbaijan Premier League are included.

== Azerbaijan Premier League 2009-10 ==
=== Baku ===
In: Note: Flags indicate national team as defined under FIFA eligibility rules; some limited exceptions apply. Players may hold more than one non-FIFA nationality.

No.	Pos.	Nation	Player
6	DF	TUR	Kürşat Duymuş (from (Turkey) Kartalspor)
11	FW	MAR	Adnan Barakat (from (Netherlands) Den Bosch)
12	FW	MDA	Veaceslav Sofroni (from (Moldova) Zimbru Chişinău)
21	MF	BRA	Wênio (from (Portugal) Leixões).
29	DF	AZE	Aziz Guliyev (from (Azerbaijan) FK Karvan)
34	FW	BRA	Adriano (from (Brazil) Paraná)
55	FW	KEN	Allan Wanga (from (Angola) Atlético Petróleos Luanda)

Out: Note: Flags indicate national team as defined under FIFA eligibility rules; some limited exceptions apply. Players may hold more than one non-FIFA nationality.

No.	Pos.	Nation	Player
6	DF	ROU	Mihai Panc (to (Romania) CSMS Iaşi)
10	MF	GEO	Amiran Mujiri (to (Azerbaijan) Standard Sumgayit)
21	DF	BUL	Aleksandar Tomash (to (Bulgaria) Slavia Sofia)
22	MF	AZE	Orkhan Safiyaroglu (to (Azerbaijan) AZAL)
29	MF	ROU	Cristian Muscalu (loan to (Bulgaria) Chernomorets Burgas)
55	FW	GEO	Giorgi Adamia (to (Azerbaijan) Qarabağ)

=== Gabala ===
In: Note: Flags indicate national team as defined under FIFA eligibility rules; some limited exceptions apply. Players may hold more than one non-FIFA nationality.

No.	Pos.	Nation	Player
2	DF	BUL	Velichko Velichkov (From (Bulgaria) OFC Sliven 2000)
5	DF	AZE	Sergey Sokolov (From (Azerbaijan) Simurq)
8	MF	UKR	Maksym Skorokhodov (From (Ukraine) Metalurh Zaporizhya)
16	MF	GUI	Abdoul Kader Camara (from (Azerbaijan) Olimpik-Shuvalan)
17	MF	POR	Paulino Lopes Tavares (From (Sweden) Trelleborgs FF)

Out: Note: Flags indicate national team as defined under FIFA eligibility rules; some limited exceptions apply. Players may hold more than one non-FIFA nationality.

No.	Pos.	Nation	Player
2	DF	SRB	Milan Marinković (to (Serbia) Sinđelić Niš)
16	DF	UKR	Mykola Hybalyuk (to (Ukraine) Hoverla-Zakarpattia Uzhhorod)
17	MF	UKR	Volodimir Bondarchuk (to (Ukraine) Sevastopol)

=== Inter Baku ===
In: Note: Flags indicate national team as defined under FIFA eligibility rules; some limited exceptions apply. Players may hold more than one non-FIFA nationality.

No.	Pos.	Nation	Player
—	DF	BRA	Filipe Machado (from (Italy) Salernitana)
—	DF	LTU	Paulius Paknys (from (Poland) Korona Kielce)
—	DF	GEO	Giorgi Navalovski (Loan from (Russia) Anzhi Makhachkala)
—	MF	AZE	Nizami Hajiyev (From (Azerbaijan) Khazar Lankaran)

Out: Note: Flags indicate national team as defined under FIFA eligibility rules; some limited exceptions apply. Players may hold more than one non-FIFA nationality.

No.	Pos.	Nation	Player
2	DF	AZE	Shahriyar Rahimov (on loan to (Azerbaijan) FK Karvan)
20	DF	AZE	Mahir Shukurov (to (Russia) Anzhi Makhachkala)
25	FW	AZE	Javid Huseynov (to (Azerbaijan) Neftchi Baku)

=== FK Karvan ===
In: Note: Flags indicate national team as defined under FIFA eligibility rules; some limited exceptions apply. Players may hold more than one non-FIFA nationality.

No.	Pos.	Nation	Player
—	DF	AZE	Shahriyar Rahimov (loan from (Azerbaijan) Inter Baku)

Out: Note: Flags indicate national team as defined under FIFA eligibility rules; some limited exceptions apply. Players may hold more than one non-FIFA nationality.

No.	Pos.	Nation	Player
—	DF	AZE	Aziz Guliyev (to (Azerbaijan) Baku)

=== Khazar Lankaran ===
In: Note: Flags indicate national team as defined under FIFA eligibility rules; some limited exceptions apply. Players may hold more than one non-FIFA nationality.

No.	Pos.	Nation	Player
3	DF	ALB	Elvin Beqiri (from (Albania) Vllaznia Shkodër)
4	DF	EST	Tihhon Šišov (from (Estonia) Levadia Tallinn)
28	MF	BRA	Cristian (from (Brazil) Ituano)

Out: Note: Flags indicate national team as defined under FIFA eligibility rules; some limited exceptions apply. Players may hold more than one non-FIFA nationality.

No.	Pos.	Nation	Player
2	DF	TUR	Fatih Sonkaya (to (Turkey) Kayseri Erciyesspor)
3	DF	BRA	Denis Silva (to (Brazil) Grêmio)
8	MF	BRA	Juninho (to (Azerbaijan) Baku)
19	DF	BUL	Kostadin Dzhambazov (to (Bulgaria) Neftochimic Burgas)

=== FK Mughan ===
In: Note: Flags indicate national team as defined under FIFA eligibility rules; some limited exceptions apply. Players may hold more than one non-FIFA nationality.

No.	Pos.	Nation	Player

Out: Note: Flags indicate national team as defined under FIFA eligibility rules; some limited exceptions apply. Players may hold more than one non-FIFA nationality.

No.	Pos.	Nation	Player

=== Neftchi Baku ===
In: Note: Flags indicate national team as defined under FIFA eligibility rules; some limited exceptions apply. Players may hold more than one non-FIFA nationality.

No.	Pos.	Nation	Player
—	DF	GEO	Valeri Abramidze (from (Russia) Dynamo Barnaul)
—	MF	AZE	Javid Huseynov (from (Azerbaijan) Inter Baku)
—	FW	EST	Vladimir Voskoboinikov (from (Russia) Luch-Energiya)

Out: Note: Flags indicate national team as defined under FIFA eligibility rules; some limited exceptions apply. Players may hold more than one non-FIFA nationality.

No.	Pos.	Nation	Player
—	DF	EST	Andrei Stepanov (from (Russia) Khimki)

=== Olimpik-Shuvalan ===
In: Note: Flags indicate national team as defined under FIFA eligibility rules; some limited exceptions apply. Players may hold more than one non-FIFA nationality.

No.	Pos.	Nation	Player
—	DF	SRB	Mirko Bunjevčević (from (Serbia) FK Čukarički)
—	MF	AZE	Orkhan Safiyaroglu (from (Azerbaijan) Baku)
—	FW	BRA	Junivan (from (Azerbaijan) Turan Tovuz)
—	FW	BRA	Ismael Gaúcho (from (Portugal) Pinhalnovense)

Out: Note: Flags indicate national team as defined under FIFA eligibility rules; some limited exceptions apply. Players may hold more than one non-FIFA nationality.

No.	Pos.	Nation	Player
6	MF	GUI	Abdoul Kader Camara (to (Azerbaijan) Gabala)
8	DF	AZE	Fizuli Mammedov (to (Azerbaijan) FK Karvan)
14	DF	AZE	Vasif Hagverdiyev
16	MF	RUS	Ramaz Dzhabnidze (to (Russia) FC Nara-ShBFR Naro-Fominsk)
19	MF	BLR	Artsyom Vaskow (to (Latvia) SK Blāzma)
20	FW	AZE	Ramin Nasibov (to (Azerbaijan) Simurq)
22	MF	FRA	Ender Günlü (to (Bulgaria) Akademik Sofia)
24	FW	LVA	Nikolajs Kozačuks (to (Latvia) FC Tranzit)

=== Qarabağ ===
In: Note: Flags indicate national team as defined under FIFA eligibility rules; some limited exceptions apply. Players may hold more than one non-FIFA nationality.

No.	Pos.	Nation	Player
—	FW	GEO	Giorgi Adamia (from (Azerbaijan) Baku)

Out: Note: Flags indicate national team as defined under FIFA eligibility rules; some limited exceptions apply. Players may hold more than one non-FIFA nationality.

No.	Pos.	Nation	Player
—	FW	AZE	Vagif Javadov (to (Netherlands) FC Twente).

=== Simurq ===
In: Note: Flags indicate national team as defined under FIFA eligibility rules; some limited exceptions apply. Players may hold more than one non-FIFA nationality.

No.	Pos.	Nation	Player

Out: Note: Flags indicate national team as defined under FIFA eligibility rules; some limited exceptions apply. Players may hold more than one non-FIFA nationality.

No.	Pos.	Nation	Player
—	DF	AZE	Sergey Sokolov (to (Azerbaijan) Gabala)

=== Standard Sumgayit ===
In: Note: Flags indicate national team as defined under FIFA eligibility rules; some limited exceptions apply. Players may hold more than one non-FIFA nationality.

No.	Pos.	Nation	Player
—	MF	GEO	Amiran Mujiri (from (Azerbaijan) Inter Baku)

Out: Note: Flags indicate national team as defined under FIFA eligibility rules; some limited exceptions apply. Players may hold more than one non-FIFA nationality.

No.	Pos.	Nation	Player

=== Turan ===
In: Note: Flags indicate national team as defined under FIFA eligibility rules; some limited exceptions apply. Players may hold more than one non-FIFA nationality.

No.	Pos.	Nation	Player

Out: Note: Flags indicate national team as defined under FIFA eligibility rules; some limited exceptions apply. Players may hold more than one non-FIFA nationality.

No.	Pos.	Nation	Player
—	FW	BRA	Junivan (to (Azerbaijan) Olimpik-Shuvalan)
