= List of Azerbaijan football transfers summer 2009 =

This is a list of Azerbaijan football transfers in the summer transfer window 2009 by club. Only clubs of the 2009–10 Azerbaijan Premier League are included.

== Azerbaijan Premier League 2009-10 ==
=== Baku ===
In: Note: Flags indicate national team as defined under FIFA eligibility rules; some limited exceptions apply. Players may hold more than one non-FIFA nationality.

| No. | Pos. | Nation | Player |
|---|---|---|---|
| 2 | DF | BRA | Rafael Barbosa (from (Brazil) Volta Redonda) |
| 5 | DF | SRB | Stevan Bates (from (France) LB Châteauroux) |
| 6 | DF | ROU | Mihai Panc (from (Romania) Gloria Bistriţa) |
| 11 | FW | ROU | Daniel Opriţa (from (Spain) Lorca Deportiva) |
| 16 | DF | AZE | Haji Ahmadov (from youth team) |
| 17 | DF | AZE | Rahman Hajiyev (from youth team) |
| 29 | MF | ROU | Cristian Muscalu (from (Bosnia and Herzegovina) FK Slavija) |
| 33 | DF | AZE | Saşa Yunisoğlu (from (Poland) Polonia Warsaw) |
| 77 | MF | CRO | Aleksandar Šolić (from (Croatia) NK Osijek) |
| 85 | FW | BRA | Jabá (from (Turkey) Ankaragücü) |

Out: Note: Flags indicate national team as defined under FIFA eligibility rules; some limited exceptions apply. Players may hold more than one non-FIFA nationality.

| No. | Pos. | Nation | Player |
|---|---|---|---|
| — | MF | AZE | Ramazan Abbasov (to (Azerbaijan) Khazar Lankaran) |
| 2 | DF | BRA | Rafael Barbosa (released, joined (Bulgaria) Slavia Sofia) |
| 9 | FW | BRA | Felipe (loan return to (Russia) Spartak Nalchik) |
| 11 | FW | ROU | Daniel Opriţa (released, joined (Romania) Petrolul Ploieşti) |
| 30 | FW | BRA | William Batista (loan return to (Ukraine) FC Kharkiv) |
| 12 | FW | ARG | Fernando Pérez (released) |

=== Gabala ===
In: Note: Flags indicate national team as defined under FIFA eligibility rules; some limited exceptions apply. Players may hold more than one non-FIFA nationality.

| No. | Pos. | Nation | Player |
|---|---|---|---|
| 6 | DF | SRB | Ljuba Baranin (From (Serbia) FK Bežanija) |
| 14 | DF | SRB | Milan Antić (From (Montenegro) Jedinstvo Bijelo Polje) |
| 15 | DF | ROU | Răzvan Ţârlea (From (Romania) Petrolul Ploiești) |
| 16 | DF | UKR | Mykola Hybalyuk (to (Moldova) Dacia Chişinău) |
| 17 | MF | UKR | Volodimir Bondarchuk (to (Ukraine) Sevastopol) |
| 19 | MF | GEO | Revaz Getsadze (From (Azerbaijan) Olimpik Baku) |
| 20 | MF | ARG | Cristián Torres (From (Latvia) FK Jūrmala) |
| 21 | DF | AZE | Arif Dashdemirov (from (Azerbaijan) Standard Sumgayit) |
| 24 | FW | UKR | Igor Melnyk (to (Ukraine) Illichivets Mariupol) |

Out: Note: Flags indicate national team as defined under FIFA eligibility rules; some limited exceptions apply. Players may hold more than one non-FIFA nationality.

| No. | Pos. | Nation | Player |
|---|---|---|---|
| 3 | MF | RUS | Anatoli Tebloyev (Retired) |
| 6 | MF | GUI | Abdoul Kader Camara (to (Azerbaijan) Olimpik-Shuvalan) |
| 14 | FW | IRN | Farzad Hatami (to (Iran) Sepahan) |
| 16 | MF | MDA | Victor Comleonoc (to (Ukraine) Obolon Kyiv) |
| 17 | MF | GEO | Tornike Aptsiauri (to (Georgia (country)) FC Zestafoni) |
| 24 | DF | TKM | Mekan Nasyrow (to (Indonesia) Persik Kediri) |

=== Inter Baku ===
In: Note: Flags indicate national team as defined under FIFA eligibility rules; some limited exceptions apply. Players may hold more than one non-FIFA nationality.

| No. | Pos. | Nation | Player |
|---|---|---|---|
| 11 | FW | AZE | Asif Mammadov (From (Azerbaijan) Neftchi Baku) |
| 19 | MF | GEO | David Odikadze (From (Hungary) Győri ETO) |
| 20 | DF | AZE | Mahir Shukurov (From (Azerbaijan) Olimpik Baku) |
| 20 | FW | LVA | Ģirts Karlsons (From (Latvia) Liepājas Metalurgs) |
| 21 | FW | LTU | Robertas Poškus (From (Russia) Ural Sverdlovsk Oblast) |
| 27 | DF | SVK | Lubomír Kubica (From (Israel) Ashdod) |
| 30 | DF | GEO | Kakhaber Mzhavanadze (From (Moldova) Dacia Chişinău) |
| 34 | MF | AZE | Aleksandr Chertoganov (From (Azerbaijan) Simurq) |
| 72 | GK | GEO | Giorgi Lomaia (From (Georgia (country)) Lokomotivi Tbilisi) |
| — | FW | BRA | Leo Rocha (From (Azerbaijan) Standard Baku) |

Out: Note: Flags indicate national team as defined under FIFA eligibility rules; some limited exceptions apply. Players may hold more than one non-FIFA nationality.

| No. | Pos. | Nation | Player |
|---|---|---|---|
| 17 | MF | AZE | Elvin Mammadov (to (Azerbaijan) Qarabağ) |
| 22 | FW | URU | Walter Guglielmone (to (Azerbaijan) Neftchi Baku) |

=== FK Karvan ===
In: Note: Flags indicate national team as defined under FIFA eligibility rules; some limited exceptions apply. Players may hold more than one non-FIFA nationality.

| No. | Pos. | Nation | Player |

Out: Note: Flags indicate national team as defined under FIFA eligibility rules; some limited exceptions apply. Players may hold more than one non-FIFA nationality.

| No. | Pos. | Nation | Player |
|---|---|---|---|
| — | DF | AZE | Tural Narimanov (loan return to (Azerbaijan) Neftchi Baku) |
| — | FW | AZE | Vüqar Nadirov (to (Azerbaijan) FK Qarabağ) |

=== Khazar Lankaran ===
In: Note: Flags indicate national team as defined under FIFA eligibility rules; some limited exceptions apply. Players may hold more than one non-FIFA nationality.

| No. | Pos. | Nation | Player |
|---|---|---|---|
| 6 | DF | CZE | Tomas Ineman (from (Czech Republic) Slovácko) |
| 12 | FW | HON | Allan Lalín (from (Honduras) Real España) |
| 15 | FW | NGA | Emeka Opara (from (Tunisia) Étoile du Sahel) |
| 17 | MF | AZE | Ramazan Abbasov (from (Azerbaijan) Baku) |
| 20 | FW | MDA | Denis Calincov (from (Moldova) Academia Chişinău) |
| 23 | MF | AZE | Nizami Hajiyev (from (Azerbaijan) Olimpik-Shuvalan) |
| 77 | DF | SVK | Ivan Pecha (from (Romania) Ceahlăul Piatra Neamţ) |

Out: Note: Flags indicate national team as defined under FIFA eligibility rules; some limited exceptions apply. Players may hold more than one non-FIFA nationality.

| No. | Pos. | Nation | Player |
|---|---|---|---|
| 2 | DF | TUR | Göksel Akinci (to (Turkey) Sarıyer) |
| 5 | MF | AZE | Emin Quliyev |
| 6 | DF | AZE | Fizuli Mammadov |
| 11 | FW | BRA | Rômulo Silvano da Silva (to (Brazil) Ceará) |
| 12 | GK | AZE | Ramiz Kerimov |
| 19 | DF | BUL | Kostadin Dzhambazov (to (Bulgaria) Neftochimic) |
| 20 | FW | ROU | Claudiu Răducanu (to (Spain) Unió Esportiva Poble Sec) |
| 23 | DF | LTU | Audrius Veikutis (to (Finland) Atlantis) |
| 27 | MF | AZE | Rashad Abdullayev (to (Azerbaijan) Neftchi Baku) |
| 34 | DF | TUR | Muammer Erdoğdu (to (Azerbaijan) Turan Tovuz) |
| 50 | FW | CIV | Yacouba Bamba (to (Azerbaijan) FK Karvan) |
| 60 | FW | TUR | Ahmet Dursun (to (Turkey) Adanaspor) |
| 77 | FW | POR | Renato Queirós (to (Portugal) Feirense) |
| — | FW | SWE | Nadir Benchenaa (to (Sweden) Dalkurd) |

=== FK Mughan ===
In: Note: Flags indicate national team as defined under FIFA eligibility rules; some limited exceptions apply. Players may hold more than one non-FIFA nationality.

| No. | Pos. | Nation | Player |

Out: Note: Flags indicate national team as defined under FIFA eligibility rules; some limited exceptions apply. Players may hold more than one non-FIFA nationality.

| No. | Pos. | Nation | Player |
|---|---|---|---|
| — | MF | AZE | Tarlan Khalilov (to (Azerbaijan) Olimpik-Shuvalan) |

=== Neftchi Baku ===
In: Note: Flags indicate national team as defined under FIFA eligibility rules; some limited exceptions apply. Players may hold more than one non-FIFA nationality.

| No. | Pos. | Nation | Player |
|---|---|---|---|
| 4 | DF | EST | Taavi Rähn (from (Lithuania) FK Ekranas) |
| 5 | MF | ROU | Leonard Naidin (from (Romania) Politehnica Iaşi) |
| 9 | FW | URU | Walter Guglielmone (from (Azerbaijan) Inter Baku) |
| 12 | GK | LTU | Paulius Grybauskas (from (Romania) Oţelul Galaţi) |
| 14 | DF | EST | Andrei Stepanov (from (England) Watford) |
| 23 | DF | AZE | Tural Narimanov (loan return from (Azerbaijan) FK Karvan) |

Out: Note: Flags indicate national team as defined under FIFA eligibility rules; some limited exceptions apply. Players may hold more than one non-FIFA nationality.

| No. | Pos. | Nation | Player |
|---|---|---|---|
| 5 | DF | AUS | John Tambouras (to (Australia) North Queensland Fury) |
| 6 | DF | IRL | Joe Kendrick (to (Republic of Ireland) Sligo Rovers) |
| — | DF | UKR | Volodymyr Olefir (to (Ukraine) Oleksandriya) |
| 11 | MF | BUL | Marcho Dafchev (to (Bulgaria) Lokomotiv Sofia) |
| 77 | MF | BUL | Svetoslav Petrov (to (Bulgaria) CSKA Sofia) |
| — | FW | AZE | Asif Mammadov (to (Azerbaijan) Inter Baku) |

=== Olimpik-Shuvalan ===
In: Note: Flags indicate national team as defined under FIFA eligibility rules; some limited exceptions apply. Players may hold more than one non-FIFA nationality.

| No. | Pos. | Nation | Player |
|---|---|---|---|
| 4 | MF | GEO | Roman Goginashvili |
| 6 | MF | GUI | Abdoul Kader Camara (from (Azerbaijan) Gabala) |
| 9 | FW | MDA | Anatolie Doroș (from (Azerbaijan) Karvan) |
| 10 | MF | GEO | Nugzar Kvirtiya (from (Russia) FC Znamya) |
| 15 | MF | AZE | Huseyn Akhundov (from (Azerbaijan) MOIK Baku) |
| 17 | MF | AZE | Tarlan Khalilov (from (Azerbaijan) FK Mughan) |
| 18 | MF | AZE | Ilgar Gurbanov (from (Turkey) Sivasspor) |
| 19 | MF | BLR | Artsyom Vaskow (from (Belarus) Neman Grodno) |
| 22 | MF | FRA | Ender Günlü (from (Switzerland) Racing Club Genève) |
| 23 | FW | NGA | Viktor Ibekoyi (from (Azerbaijan) Turan Tovuz) |
| — | MF | AZE | Vusal Garaev (from (Azerbaijan) FK Mughan) |

Out: Note: Flags indicate national team as defined under FIFA eligibility rules; some limited exceptions apply. Players may hold more than one non-FIFA nationality.

| No. | Pos. | Nation | Player |
|---|---|---|---|
| 1 | GK | AZE | Zabit Safarov (to (Azerbaijan) Khazar Lankaran) |
| 8 | FW | BRA | Junivan (to (Azerbaijan) Turan Tovuz) |
| 10 | MF | TUN | Bechir Mogaadi (to (Azerbaijan) Karvan) |
| 17 | DF | AZE | Ramin Guliyev (to (Azerbaijan) Standard Sumgayit) |
| 19 | MF | GEO | Revaz Getsadze (to (Azerbaijan) Gabala) |
| 20 | MF | AZE | Nizami Hajiyev (to (Azerbaijan) Khazar Lankaran) |
| 25 | DF | AZE | Mahir Shukurov (to (Azerbaijan) Inter Baku) |
| 35 | MF | GEO | Roman Akhalkatsi (to (Azerbaijan) Simurq) |
| 44 | GK | AZE | Rauf Mehdiyev (to (Azerbaijan) Simurq) |
| 55 | FW | AZE | Leandro Gomes (to (Azerbaijan) Karvan) |

=== Qarabağ ===
In: Note: Flags indicate national team as defined under FIFA eligibility rules; some limited exceptions apply. Players may hold more than one non-FIFA nationality.

| No. | Pos. | Nation | Player |
|---|---|---|---|
| 9 | MF | AZE | Elvin Mammadov (from (Azerbaijan) Inter Baku) |
| 14 | MF | AZE | Rashad Sadigov (from (Turkey) Kocaelispor) |
| 17 | FW | AZE | Vüqar Nadirov (from (Azerbaijan) FK Karvan) |
| 22 | MF | AZE | Afran Ismayilov (loan return from (Azerbaijan) Turan Tovuz) |

Out: Note: Flags indicate national team as defined under FIFA eligibility rules; some limited exceptions apply. Players may hold more than one non-FIFA nationality.

| No. | Pos. | Nation | Player |
|---|---|---|---|
| 9 | FW | BIH | Nidal Ferhatovic (to (Bosnia and Herzegovina) Famos-SAŠK Napredak) |
| 10 | FW | MKD | Artim Sakiri (Retired) |
| 13 | DF | MKD | Zekirija Ramadan (to (North Macedonia) Shkëndija) |
| 17 | MF | BIH | Sedat Şahin (to (Turkey) Bursa Nilüfer) |
| — | DF | AZE | Bayram Kerimov (to (Azerbaijan) Turan Tovuz) |

=== Simurq ===
In: Note: Flags indicate national team as defined under FIFA eligibility rules; some limited exceptions apply. Players may hold more than one non-FIFA nationality.

| No. | Pos. | Nation | Player |

Out: Note: Flags indicate national team as defined under FIFA eligibility rules; some limited exceptions apply. Players may hold more than one non-FIFA nationality.

| No. | Pos. | Nation | Player |
|---|---|---|---|
| — | MF | AZE | Aleksandr Chertoganov (to (Azerbaijan) Inter Baku) |

=== Standard Sumgayit ===
In: Note: Flags indicate national team as defined under FIFA eligibility rules; some limited exceptions apply. Players may hold more than one non-FIFA nationality.

| No. | Pos. | Nation | Player |

Out: Note: Flags indicate national team as defined under FIFA eligibility rules; some limited exceptions apply. Players may hold more than one non-FIFA nationality.

| No. | Pos. | Nation | Player |
|---|---|---|---|
| — | DF | AZE | Arif Dashdemirov (to (Azerbaijan) Gabala) |
| — | FW | BRA | Léo Rocha (to (Azerbaijan) Inter Baku) |

=== Turan ===
In: Note: Flags indicate national team as defined under FIFA eligibility rules; some limited exceptions apply. Players may hold more than one non-FIFA nationality.

| No. | Pos. | Nation | Player |

Out: Note: Flags indicate national team as defined under FIFA eligibility rules; some limited exceptions apply. Players may hold more than one non-FIFA nationality.

| No. | Pos. | Nation | Player |
|---|---|---|---|
| — | MF | AZE | Afran Ismayilov (loan return to (Azerbaijan) Qarabağ) |
| — | FW | NGA | Viktor Ibekoyi (to (Azerbaijan) Olimpik-Shuvalan) |
