= 2009–10 in Azerbaijani football =

2009-10 season

Azerbaijani football in 2010

== Azerbaijan Premier League ==
Pos	Team	Pld	W	D	L	GF	GA	GD	Pts	Qualification
1	Inter Baku	22	15	4	3	36	18	+18	49	Qualification for championship group
2	Khazar Lankaran	22	12	8	2	29	11	+18	44	Qualification for championship group
3	Qarabağ	22	11	9	2	21	12	+9	42	Qualification for championship group
4	Baku	22	10	7	5	22	17	+5	37	Qualification for championship group
5	Gabala	22	10	6	6	24	21	+3	36	Qualification for championship group
6	Neftçi Baku	22	9	8	5	20	14	+6	35	Qualification for championship group
7	Simurq	22	9	7	6	26	21	+5	34	Qualification for relegation group
8	Olimpik-Shuvalan	22	6	7	9	20	23	−3	25	Qualification for relegation group
9	Turan	22	4	5	13	23	32	−9	17	Qualification for relegation group
10	Mughan	22	3	7	12	12	27	−15	16	Qualification for relegation group
11	Standard	22	2	5	15	16	34	−18	11	Qualification for relegation group
12	Karvan	22	2	5	15	17	36	−19	11	Qualification for relegation group

Source: Soccerway.com
Rules for classification: 1) points; 2) goal difference; 3) number of goals scored.

=== Championship group ===
Pos	Team	Pld	W	D	L	GF	GA	GD	Pts	Qualification
1	Inter Baku (C)	20	7	8	5	22	19	+3	29	Qualification for Champions League second qualifying round
2	Baku	20	7	7	6	19	15	+4	28	Qualification for Europa League second qualifying round (Note: Baku were the winners of the 2009–10 Azerbaijan Cup competition and qualified for the second qualifying round of the UEFA Europa League.)
3	Qarabağ	20	6	9	5	16	18	−2	27 (Note: QAR: 7 pts, 4–3; KHA: 4 pts, 3–4)	Qualification for Europa League first qualifying round
4	Khazar Lankaran	20	6	9	5	19	14	+5	27	Qualification for Europa League first qualifying round
5	Neftçi Baku	20	4	11	5	11	12	−1	23	
6	Gabala	20	4	8	8	18	27	−9	20	

Source: Soccerway.com
Rules for classification: 1) points; 2) head-to-head points; 3) head-to-head goal difference; 4) head-to-head goals scored; 5) goal difference; 6) number of goals scored.
(C) Champions

=== Relegation group ===
Pos	Team	Pld	W	D	L	GF	GA	GD	Pts	Relegation
7	Olimpik-Shuvalan	20	10	6	4	27	15	+12	36	
8	Simurq	20	8	7	5	21	21	0	31	
9	Turan	20	7	8	5	27	22	+5	29	
10	Mughan	20	7	6	7	17	16	+1	27	
11	Standard (R)	20	7	4	9	26	23	+3	25	Relegation to Azerbaijan First Division
12	Karvan (R)	20	2	7	11	14	35	−21	13	Relegation to Azerbaijan First Division

Source: Soccerway.com
Rules for classification: 1) points; 2) goal difference; 3) number of goals scored.
(R) Relegated

== Azerbaijan Cup ==
23 May 2010
20:00 AZST (UTC+5)

Khazar Lankaran	1 – 2 (a.e.t.)	Baku
Skulić 100'; Šolić 104'	Summary	Beqiri 120'

Tofiq Bahramov Stadium, Baku
Attendance: 26,000
Referee: Elchin Mämmädov

== National team ==
12 August 2009 2010 FIFA WC Q	Azerbaijan	0 – 2	Germany	(Azerbaijan) Tofiq Bahramov Stadium, Baku
21:00 UTC+5		(Report)	11' Schweinsteiger; 53' Klose	Attendance: 22,500; Referee: (Republic of Ireland) Alan Kelly

5 September 2009 2010 FIFA WC Q	Azerbaijan	1 – 2	Finland	(Azerbaijan) Lankaran City Stadium, Lankaran
20:00 UTC+5	Məmmədov 49'	(Report)	74' Tihinen; 85' Johansson	Attendance: 12,000; Referee: (Cyprus) Stelios Trifonos

9 September 2009 2010 FIFA WC Q	Germany	4 – 0	Azerbaijan	(Germany) AWD-Arena, Hannover
20:45 UTC+2	Ballack 14' (pen.); Klose 55', 65'; Podolski 71'	(Report)		Attendance: 35,369; Referee: (Greece) Anastasios Kakos

10 October 2009 2010 FIFA WC Q	Liechtenstein	0 – 2	Azerbaijan	(Liechtenstein) Rheinpark Stadion, Vaduz
20:00 UTC+2		(Report)	55' Javadov; 82' Məmmədov	Attendance: 1,635; Referee: (Montenegro) Pavle Radovanović

14 October 2009 2010 FIFA WC Q	Azerbaijan	1 – 1	Russia	(Azerbaijan) Tofiq Bahramov Stadium, Baku
21:00 UTC+5	Javadov 53'	(Report)	13' Arshavin	Attendance: 17,000; Referee: (England) Howard Webb

15 November 2009 UAE Int. Cup	Iraq	1 – 0	Azerbaijan	(United Arab Emirates) Tahnoun bin Mohammed Stadium, Al Ain
13:45 CET	Abbas 88'	(Report)		Referee: (United Arab Emirates) Mohamed Ali Al Junaibi

18 November 2009 UAE Int. Cup	Czech Republic	0 – 2	Azerbaijan	(United Arab Emirates) Tahnoun bin Mohammed Stadium, Al Ain
		(Report)	25' Javadov; 89' Abushev	Attendance: 500; Referee: (United Arab Emirates) Farid Ali Al Marzouqi

25 February 2010 Friendly	Jordan	0 – 2	Azerbaijan	(Jordan) King Abdullah Stadium, Amman
17:00 CET		(Report)	1' Ramim; 31' Ismayilov	Attendance: 3,000; Referee: (Egypt) Hamdi Shaaban

3 March 2010 Friendly	Luxembourg	1 – 2	Azerbaijan	Stade Josy Barthel, Luxembourg City
20:00 CET	Strasser 34'	(Report)	24' Guliev; 37' Məmmədov	Attendance: 874; Referee: (Finland) Petteri Kari

26 May 2010 Friendly	Moldova	1 – 1	Azerbaijan	(Austria) Sportzentrum Seekirchen, Seekirchen
18:30 CEST	Cojocari 81'	(Report)	21' Məmmədov	Attendance: 200; Referee: (Austria) Gerald Lehner

29 May 2010 Friendly	Azerbaijan	1 – 3	Macedonia	(Austria) Sportplatz Bischofshofen, Bischofshofen
18:30 CET	Mammadov 89'	(Report)	9' Tričkovski; 66' (o.g.) R.F. Sadygov; 88' Ǵurovski	Attendance: 500; Referee: (Austria) Dietmar Drabek

2 June 2010 Friendly	Honduras	0 – 0	Azerbaijan	(Austria) Alois Latini Stadion, Zell am See
20:30 UTC		(Report)		Attendance: 300; Referee: (Austria) Oliver Drachta

=== Goal scorers ===
Place	Position	Name	Friendlies	WC Qualifying	Total
1	MF	Elvin Mammadov	3	2	5
2	FW	Vagif Javadov	1	2	3
3	DF	Ruslan Abishov	1	0	1
3	MF	Fábio Luís Ramim	1	0	1
3	MF	Afran Ismayilov	1	0	1
3	FW	Farid Guliyev	1	0	1
		TOTALS	8	4	12

== Azerbaijani clubs in Europe ==
=== Summary ===
Club	Competition	Final round
Baku	UEFA Champions League; UEFA Europa League	Third qualifying round Play-off round
Qarabağ	UEFA Europa League	Play-off round
Inter Baku	UEFA Europa League	First qualifying round
Simurq	UEFA Europa League	First qualifying round

=== Baku ===
Date	Venue	Opponents	Score	Baku scorer(s)	Report
2009–10 Champions League - Second qualifying round
14 July 2009	Aukštaitija Stadium, Panevėžys (A)	(Lithuania) Ekranas	2–2	Félix; Batista	
21 July 2009	Tofiq Bahramov Republican Stadium, Baku (H)	(Lithuania) Ekranas	4–2	Félix (2); Mujiri; Šolić	
2009–10 Champions League - Third qualifying round
28 July 2009	Tofiq Bahramov Republican Stadium, Baku (H)	(Bulgaria) Levski Sofia	0–0		
5 August 2009	Georgi Asparuhov Stadium, Sofia (A)	(Bulgaria) Levski Sofia	2–0		
2009–10 Europa League - Play-off round
20 August 2009	Tofiq Bahramov Republican Stadium, Baku (H)	(Switzerland) Basel	1–3	Pérez	
27 August 2009	St. Jakob-Park, Basel (A)	(Switzerland) Basel	5–1	Félix	

=== Qarabağ ===
Date	Venue	Opponents	Score	Qarabağ scorer(s)	Report
2009–10 Europa League - Second qualifying round
16 July 2009	Lerkendal Stadion, Trondheim (A)	(Norway) Rosenborg	0–0		
23 July 2009	Tofiq Bahramov Republican Stadium, Baku (H)	(Norway) Rosenborg	1–0	Sadygov	
2009–10 Europa League - Third qualifying round
30 July 2009	Finnair Stadium, Helsinki (A)	(Finland) Honka Espoo	0–1	Mammadov	
6 August 2009	Tofiq Bahramov Republican Stadium, Baku (H)	(Finland) Honka Espoo	2–1	Mammadov; Sadygov	
2009–10 Europa League - Play-off round
20 August 2009	De Grolsch Veste, Enschede (A)	(Netherlands) Twente	3–1	Nadirov	
27 August 2009	Tofiq Bahramov Republican Stadium, Baku (H)	(Netherlands) Twente	0–0		

=== Inter Baku ===
Date	Venue	Opponents	Score	Inter Baku scorer(s)	Report
2009–10 Europa League - First qualifying round
2 July 2009	Štadión Antona Malatinského, Trnava (A)	(Slovakia) Spartak Trnava	2–1	Ángel Gutiérrez	
9 July 2009	Tofiq Bahramov Republican Stadium, Baku (H)	(Slovakia) Spartak Trnava	1–3	Guglielmone	

=== Simurq ===
Date	Venue	Opponents	Score	Simurq scorer(s)	Report
2009–10 Europa League - First qualifying round
2 July 2009	Tofiq Bahramov Republican Stadium, Baku (H)	(Israel) Bnei Yehuda	0–1		
9 July 2009	Bloomfield Stadium, Tel Aviv (A)	(Israel) Bnei Yehuda	3–0		
