= 2009–10 FK Qarabağ season =

Qarabağ
2009–10 season
- Chairman: Tahir Gözal
- Manager: Gurban Gurbanov
- Stadium: Guzanli Olympic Complex Stadium
- Premier League: 3rd
- Azerbaijan Cup: Quarterfinals vs Khazar Lankaran
- Europa League: Play-off round vs FC Twente
- Top goalscorer: League: Rauf Aliyev & Afran Ismayilov (5); All: 3 Players (5)
Home colours	Away colours

The Qarabağ 2009–10 season was Qarabağ's 17th Azerbaijan Premier League season, and their second season under Gurban Gurbanov. They finished the season in 3rd place, and were knocked out of the 2009–10 Azerbaijan Cup at the quarterfinal stage by Khazar Lankaran. They also participated in the 2009–10 UEFA Europa League, entering at the Second Qualifying Round stage. They beat Rosenborg BK of Norway, before beating FC Honka of Finland in the Third Qualifying Round. This meant they faced FC Twente of the Netherlands in the Play-off Round, which they lost 1-3 on aggregate.

== Squad ==
Note: Flags indicate national team as defined under FIFA eligibility rules; some limited exceptions apply. Players may hold more than one non-FIFA nationality.

No.	Pos.	Nation	Player
1	GK	AZE	Farhad Veliyev
2	DF	AZE	Elnur Allahverdiyev
3	DF	AZE	Aftandil Hajiyev
4	DF	AZE	Zaur Hashimov
5	DF	AZE	Maksim Medvedev
6	DF	AZE	Rashad Sadiqov
7	MF	AZE	Namiq Yusifov
8	MF	AZE	Aslan Kerimov
9	MF	AZE	Elvin Mammadov
10	MF	AZE	Emin Imamaliev
11	FW	AZE	Rauf Aliyev
12	GK	AZE	Sahil Kerimov

No.	Pos.	Nation	Player
13	DF	AZE	Gara Garayev
14	MF	AZE	Rashad Sadigov
15	MF	AZE	Aykhan Abbasov
17	FW	AZE	Vüqar Nadirov
18	MF	AZE	Natig Karimi
22	MF	AZE	Afran Ismayilov
24	DF	ALB	Admir Teli
—	DF	AZE	Nodar Mammadov
—	MF	AZE	Rashad Karimov
—	MF	AZE	Emin Mustafayev
—	FW	AZE	Tural Isgandarov
—	FW	GEO	Giorgi Adamia

== Transfers ==
=== Summer ===
In: Note: Flags indicate national team as defined under FIFA eligibility rules; some limited exceptions apply. Players may hold more than one non-FIFA nationality.

No.	Pos.	Nation	Player
2	DF	AZE	Elnur Allahverdiyev (from (Azerbaijan) Neftchi Baku)
9	MF	AZE	Elvin Mammadov (from (Azerbaijan) Inter Baku)
14	MF	AZE	Rashad Sadigov (from (Turkey) Kocaelispor)
17	FW	AZE	Vüqar Nadirov (from (Azerbaijan) FK Karvan)
22	MF	AZE	Afran Ismayilov (loan return from (Azerbaijan) Turan Tovuz)

Out: Note: Flags indicate national team as defined under FIFA eligibility rules; some limited exceptions apply. Players may hold more than one non-FIFA nationality.

No.	Pos.	Nation	Player
9	FW	BIH	Nidal Ferhatovic (to (Bosnia and Herzegovina) Famos-SAŠK Napredak)
10	FW	MKD	Artim Sakiri (Retired)
13	DF	MKD	Zekirija Ramadan (to (North Macedonia) Shkëndija)
17	MF	BIH	Sedat Şahin (to (Turkey) Bursa Nilüfer)
—	DF	AZE	Bayram Kerimov (to (Azerbaijan) Turan Tovuz)

=== Winter ===
In: Note: Flags indicate national team as defined under FIFA eligibility rules; some limited exceptions apply. Players may hold more than one non-FIFA nationality.

No.	Pos.	Nation	Player
—	FW	GEO	Giorgi Adamia (from (Azerbaijan) Baku)
—	MF	AZE	Rashad Karimov (from (Azerbaijan) Karvan)

Out: Note: Flags indicate national team as defined under FIFA eligibility rules; some limited exceptions apply. Players may hold more than one non-FIFA nationality.

No.	Pos.	Nation	Player
20	FW	AZE	Vagif Javadov (to (Netherlands) FC Twente).

== Competitions ==
=== Azerbaijan Premier League ===
==== Results ====
13 September 2009 4	Qarabağ	1 - 0	Standard	Baku^{1}
18:15 AZST (UTC+5)	Javadov 24'	Summary		Stadium: Tofiq Bahramov Stadium; Attendance: 1,200; Referee: Elchin Mämmädov

16 September 2009 1	Turan Tovuz	1 - 2	Qarabağ	Tovuz City Stadium
18:20 AZST (UTC+5)	Y.Saiko 12'	Summary	Javadov 49'; Mammadov 62'	Attendance: 4,500; Referee: Fariz Yusifov

20 September 2009 5	Simurq	1 - 0	Qarabağ	Zaqatala City Stadium
21:00 AZST (UTC+5)	Artiukh 6'	Summary		Attendance: 1,500; Referee: Afgan Hamzayev

23 September 2009 2	Qarabağ	0 - 0	Gabala	Baku^{1}
16:00 AZST (UTC+5)		Summary		Stadium: Tofiq Bahramov Stadium; Attendance: 3,000; Referee: Anar Salmanov

26 September 2009 6	Baku	0 - 1	Qarabağ	Tofig Bakhramov Stadium
17:10 AZST (UTC+5)		Summary	Kerimov 80'	Attendance: 400; Referee: Rovshan Ahmadov

18 October 2009 7	Qarabağ	1 - 0	Neftchi Baku	Baku^{1}
16:15 AZST (UTC+5)	Javadov 40'	Summary		Stadium: Tofiq Bahramov Stadium; Attendance: 1,000; Referee: Azad Mutallimov

21 October 2009 3	Mughan	0 - 1	Qarabağ	Salyan Olympic Sport Complex Stadium
AZT (UTC+4)		Summary	Ismayilov 60'	Attendance: 1,200; Referee: Elnur Muradov

25 October 2009 8	FK Karvan	1 - 1	Qarabağ	Yevlakh Stadium
AZT (UTC+4)	Ataýew 17'	Summary	Aliyev 73'	Attendance: 2,500; Referee: Afgan Hamzayev

30 October 2009 9	Qarabağ	1 - 0	Khazar Lankaran	Baku^{1}
14:20 AZST (UTC+5)	Aliyev 86'	Summary		Stadium: Tofiq Bahramov Stadium; Attendance: 1,900; Referee: Anar Salmanov

7 November 2009 10	Inter Baku	2 - 1	Qarabağ	Shafa Stadium
17:15 AZT (UTC+4)	Poškus 58'; Leo Rocha 66'	Summary	Sadygov 87'	Attendance: 2,000; Referee: Fariz Yusifov

22 November 2009 11	Qarabağ	1 - 0	Olimpik-Shuvalan	Baku^{1}
14:15 AZT (UTC+4)	Ismayilov 70'; Allahverdiyev (yellow card) 24' (yellow-red card) 75'	Summary	Laşcencov (yellow card) 39' (yellow-red card) 86'	Stadium: Tofiq Bahramov Stadium; Attendance: 1,600; Referee: Elchin Mämmädov

27 November 2009 12	Qarabağ	2 - 1	Turan Tovuz	Baku^{1}
14:15 AZT (UTC+4)	Nadirov 62', 66'	Summary	Hasanov 38'	Stadium: Tofiq Bahramov Stadium; Attendance: 1,200; Referee: Rasim Mämmädov

6 December 2009 13	Gabala	1 - 1	Qarabağ	Gabala City Stadium
14:15 AZT (UTC+4)	Stolpa 52' (pen.); Stolpa (yellow card) 1' (yellow-red card) 71'	Summary	Sadygov 78'; Teli (yellow card) 89' (yellow-red card) 90'	Attendance: 1,000; Referee: Anar Salmanov

10 December 2009 14	Qarabağ	2 - 1	Mughan	Baku^{1}
14:15 AZT (UTC+4)	Imamaliev 23'; Javadov 36'	Summary	V.Huseynov 4'	Stadium: Tofiq Bahramov Stadium; Attendance: 200; Referee: Jeyhun Hashimov

13 December 2009 15	Standard	0 - 1	Qarabağ	Mehdi Huseynzade Stadium
14:15 AZT (UTC+4)		Summary	Ismayilov 55'	Attendance: 1,500; Referee: Zohrab Aliyev

20 December 2009 16	Qarabağ	0 - 0	Simurq	Baku^{1}
14:15 AZT (UTC+4)		Summary		Stadium: Tofiq Bahramov Stadium; Attendance: 2,500; Referee: Anar Salmanov

24 December 2009 17	Qarabağ	0 - 0	Baku	Baku^{1}
14:15 AZT (UTC+4)		Summary		Stadium: Tofiq Bahramov Stadium; Attendance: 2,000; Referee: Rasim Mämmädov

3 February 2010 18	Neftchi Baku	0 - 0	Qarabağ	Tofik Bakhramov Stadium
15:00 AZT (UTC+4)	Huseynov (red card) 82'	Summary		Attendance: 1,800; Referee: Elchin Mämmädov

9 February 2010 19	Qarabağ	3 - 2	FK Karvan	Baku^{1}
14:15 AZT (UTC+4)	Ismayilov 30'; Allahverdiyev 45'; Imamaliev 64' (pen.); Abbasov (yellow card) 25' (yellow-red card) 67'	Summary	Mammadov 4', 44'	Stadium: Tofiq Bahramov Stadium; Attendance: 2,500; Referee: Rovshan Ahmadov

13 February 2010 20	Khazar Lankaran	0 - 0	Qarabağ	Lankaran City Stadium
16:00 AZT (UTC+4)		Summary		Attendance: 5,000; Referee: Anar Salmanov

17 February 2010 21	Qarabağ	1 - 1	Inter Baku	Baku^{1}
14:15 AZT (UTC+4)	Karimov 22'	Summary	Poškus 60'	Stadium: Tofiq Bahramov Stadium; Attendance: 2,000; Referee: Vusal Äliyev

20 February 2010 22	Olimpik-Shuvalan	1 - 1	Qarabağ	Shafa Stadium
14:00 AZT (UTC+4)	Gurbanov 63'	Summary	Teli 75'	Attendance: 500; Referee: Afgan Hamzayev

==== League table ====
Pos	Team	Pld	W	D	L	GF	GA	GD	Pts	Qualification
1	Inter Baku	22	15	4	3	36	18	+18	49	Qualification for championship group
2	Khazar Lankaran	22	12	8	2	29	11	+18	44	Qualification for championship group
3	Qarabağ	22	11	9	2	21	12	+9	42	Qualification for championship group
4	Baku	22	10	7	5	22	17	+5	37	Qualification for championship group
5	Gabala	22	10	6	6	24	21	+3	36	Qualification for championship group

Source: Soccerway.com
Rules for classification: 1) points; 2) goal difference; 3) number of goals scored.

=== Azerbaijan Premier League Championship Group ===
==== Results ====
12 March 2010 23	Baku	2 - 0	Qarabağ	Tofig Bakhramov Stadium
14:00 AZT (UTC+4)	Jabá 56'; Fábio 76'	Summary		Attendance: 500; Referee: Anar Salmanov

21 March 2010 24	Gabala	3 - 1	Qarabağ	Gabala City Stadium
15:00 AZT (UTC+4)	Lopes Tavares 49'; Melnyk 73', 84'	Summary	Adamia 43'	Attendance: 1,000; Referee: Afgan Hamzayev

27 March 2010 25	Qarabağ	1 - 1	Inter Baku	Baku^{1}
16:00 AZT (UTC+4)	Kerimov 86'	Summary	Abbasov 44'	Stadium: Tofiq Bahramov Stadium; Attendance: 2,000; Referee: Elchin Mämmädov

3 April 2010 26	Khazar Lankaran	2 - 1	Qarabağ	Lankaran City Stadium
18:00 AZST (UTC+5)	Tsvetkov 45' (pen.); Mario Souza 54'	Summary	Adamia 62'	Attendance: 12,440; Referee: Anar Salmanov

10 April 2010 27	Qarabağ	2 - 0	Neftchi Baku	Baku^{1}
16:00 AZST (UTC+5)	Adamia 47'; Aliyev 75'	Summary		Stadium: Tofiq Bahramov Stadium; Attendance: 2,500; Referee: Rovshan Ahmadov

17 April 2010 28	Qarabağ	1 - 4	Baku	Baku^{1}
16:00 AZST (UTC+5)	Ismayilov 57'	Summary	Sofroni 6'; Jabá 42'; Šolić 82'; Wênio 88'	Stadium: Tofiq Bahramov Stadium; Attendance: 2,000; Referee: Anar Salmanov

24 April 2010 29	Qarabağ	1 - 1	Gabala	Baku^{1}
17:00 AZST (UTC+5)	Aliyev 10'	Summary	Kerimov 18'	Stadium: Tofiq Bahramov Stadium; Attendance: 2,500; Referee: Fariz Yusifov

1 May 2010 30	Inter Baku	0 - 1	Qarabağ	Shafa Stadium
18:00 AZST (UTC+5)		Summary	Adamia 81'	Attendance: 1,000; Referee: Elchin Mämmädov

9 May 2010 31	Qarabağ	2 - 1	Khazar Lankaran	Baku^{1}
17:15 AZST (UTC+5)	Sadygov 23'; Aliyev 35'	Summary	Mario Souza 65'	Stadium: Tofiq Bahramov Stadium; Attendance: 3,000; Referee: Elchin Mämmädov

15 May 2010 32	Neftchi Baku	0 - 0	Qarabağ	Tofik Bakhramov Stadium
17:15 AZST (UTC+5)		Summary		Attendance: 3,000; Referee: Fariz Yusifov

==== Table ====
Pos	Team	Pld	W	D	L	GF	GA	GD	Pts	Qualification
1	Inter Baku (C)	20	7	8	5	22	19	+3	29	Qualification for Champions League second qualifying round
2	Baku	20	7	7	6	19	15	+4	28	Qualification for Europa League second qualifying round (Note: Baku were the winners of the 2009–10 Azerbaijan Cup competition and qualified for the second qualifying round of the UEFA Europa League.)
3	Qarabağ	20	6	9	5	16	18	−2	27 (Note: QAR: 7 pts, 4–3; KHA: 4 pts, 3–4)	Qualification for Europa League first qualifying round
4	Khazar Lankaran	20	6	9	5	19	14	+5	27	Qualification for Europa League first qualifying round
5	Neftçi Baku	20	4	11	5	11	12	−1	23	

Source: Soccerway.com
Rules for classification: 1) points; 2) head-to-head points; 3) head-to-head goal difference; 4) head-to-head goals scored; 5) goal difference; 6) number of goals scored.
(C) Champions

=== Azerbaijan Cup ===
4 November 2009 Last 16 1st Leg	Qarabağ	4 - 0	Shahdag	Baku^{1}
AZT (UTC+4)	Hajiyev 62'; Mammadov 69'; Javadov 79' (pen.); Imamaliev 89' (pen.)	Summary; Summary		Stadium: Tofiq Bahramov Stadium

11 November 2009 Last 16 2nd Leg	Shahdag	0 - 0 (0 - 4 agg.)	Qarabağ	Shovkat Ordukhanov Stadium
AZT (UTC+4)		Summary; Summary

7 March 2010 Quarter-Final 1st Leg	Qarabağ	2 - 1	Khazar Lankaran	Baku^{1}
14:15 AZT (UTC+4)	Sadygov 59'; Teli 90'	Summary	Opara 17'	Stadium: Tofiq Bahramov Stadium; Attendance: 2,000; Referee: Elchin Mämmädov

17 March 2010 Quarter-Final 2nd Leg	Khazar Lankaran	1 - 0 (2 - 2 agg.)	Qarabağ	Lankaran City Stadium
18:00 AZT (UTC+4)	Cristian 17'	Summary	Allahverdiyev (yellow card) 45' (yellow-red card) 65'; Sadygov (red card) 87'	Attendance: 8,500; Referee: Vusal Aliyev

=== UEFA Europa League ===
==== Qualifying stage ====
16 July 2009 2nd qualifying round 1st leg	Rosenborg (Norway)	0 – 0	(Azerbaijan) Qarabağ	Trondheim, Norway
22:00 AZST (UTC+5)		Report		Stadium: Lerkendal Stadion; Attendance: 6,769; Referee: Dimitar Meckarovski (Macedonia)

23 July 2009 2nd qualifying round 2nd leg	Qarabağ (Azerbaijan)	1 – 0 (1 – 0 agg.)	(Norway) Rosenborg	Baku, Azerbaijan
20:00 AZST (UTC+5)	Sadygov 45+1'	Report		Stadium: Tofiq Bahramov Stadium^{2} Attendance: 29,858; Referee: Mihaly Fabian (Hungary)

30 July 2009 3rd qualifying round 1st leg	Honka (Finland)	0 – 1	(Azerbaijan) Qarabağ	Helsinki, Finland
20:30 AZST (UTC+5)		Report	Mammadov 69'	Stadium: Finnair Stadium^{3} Attendance: 2,830; Referee: Albert Toussaint (Luxembourg)

6 August 2009 3rd qualifying round 2nd leg	Qarabağ (Azerbaijan)	2 – 1 (3 – 1 agg.)	(Finland) Honka	Baku, Azerbaijan
20:00 AZST (UTC+5)	Mammadov 32'; Sadygov 81'	Report	Koskinen 34'	Stadium: Tofiq Bahramov Stadium^{2} Attendance: 24,000; Referee: Tomasz Mikulski (Poland)

20 August 2009 Playoff round 1st leg	Twente (Netherlands)	3 – 1	(Azerbaijan) Qarabağ	Enschede, Netherlands
23:00 AZST (UTC+5)	Ruiz 38', 66'; Douglas 81'	Report	Nadirov 8'	Stadium: De Grolsch Veste; Attendance: 23,000; Referee: Andre Marriner (England)

27 August 2009 Playoff round 2nd leg	Qarabağ (Azerbaijan)	0 – 0 (1 – 3 agg.)	(Netherlands) Twente	Baku, Azerbaijan
20:00 AZST (UTC+5)		Report		Stadium: Tofiq Bahramov Stadium^{2} Attendance: 15,000; Referee: Alexandru Deaconu (Romania)

== Squad statistics ==
=== Appearances and goals ===
No.	Pos	Nat	Player	Total		Premier League		Azerbaijan Cup		Europa League	
No.	Pos	Nat	Player	Apps	Goals	Apps	Goals	Apps	Goals	Apps	Goals
1	GK	(Azerbaijan) AZE	Farhad Veliyev	35	0	29+0	0	0+0	0	6+0	0
2	DF	(Azerbaijan) AZE	Elnur Allahverdiyev	29	1	24+0	1	0+0	0	5+0	0
3	DF	(Azerbaijan) AZE	Aftandil Hajiyev	9	0	3+5	0	0+0	0	0+1	0
4	DF	(Azerbaijan) AZE	Zaur Hashimov	30	0	22+2	0	0+0	0	2+4	0
5	DF	(Azerbaijan) AZE	Maksim Medvedev	31	0	25+0	0	0+0	0	6+0	0
6	DF	(Azerbaijan) AZE	Rashad Sadygov	28	5	21+1	3	0+0	0	6+0	2
7	MF	(Azerbaijan) AZE	Namiq Yusifov	36	0	25+5	0	0+0	0	0+6	0
8	MF	(Azerbaijan) AZE	Aslan Kerimov	34	3	17+11	3	0+0	0	6+0	0
9	MF	(Azerbaijan) AZE	Elvin Mammadov	33	3	19+8	1	0+0	0	6+0	2
10	MF	(Azerbaijan) AZE	Emin Imamaliev	23	2	12+8	2	0+0	0	3+0	0
11	FW	(Azerbaijan) AZE	Rauf Aliyev	32	5	18+9	5	0+0	0	0+5	0
12	GK	(Azerbaijan) AZE	Sahil Kerimov	4	0	3+1	0	0+0	0	0+0	0
13	DF	(Azerbaijan) AZE	Gara Garayev	1	0	1+0	0	0+0	0	0+0	0
14	MF	(Azerbaijan) AZE	Rashad Sadigov	27	0	19+4	0	0+0	0	4+0	0
15	MF	(Azerbaijan) AZE	Aykhan Abbasov	11	0	6+4	0	0+0	0	1+0	0
17	FW	(Azerbaijan) AZE	Vugar Nadirov	35	3	17+12	2	0+0	0	6+0	1
22	MF	(Azerbaijan) AZE	Afran Ismayilov	31	5	27+0	5	0+0	0	3+1	0
24	DF	(Albania) ALB	Admir Teli	36	1	29+1	1	0+0	0	6+0	0
	DF	(Azerbaijan) AZE	Nodar Mammadov	7	0	4+3	0	0+0	0	0+0	0
	MF	(Azerbaijan) AZE	Rashad Karimov	10	0	8+2	0	0+0	0	0+0	0
	MF	(Azerbaijan) AZE	Emin Mustafayev	1	0	0+1	0	0+0	0	0+0	0
	FW	(Azerbaijan) AZE	Tural Isgandarov	5	0	1+4	0	0+0	0	0+0	0
	FW	(Georgia (country)) GEO	Georgi Adamia	10	4	9+1	4	0+0	0	0+0	0
Players who appeared for Qarabağ that left during the season:
20	FW	(Azerbaijan) AZE	Vagif Javadov	22	4	13+3	4	0+0	0	6+0	0

=== Goal scorers ===
Place	Position	Nation	Number	Name	Premier League	Azerbaijan Cup	Europa League	Total
1	FW	(Azerbaijan)	11	Rauf Aliyev	5	0	0	5
1	MF	(Azerbaijan)	22	Afran Ismayilov	5	0	0	5
1	FW	(Azerbaijan)	20	Vagif Javadov	4	1	0	5
4	FW	(Georgia (country))		Giorgi Adamia	4	0	0	4
4	MF	(Azerbaijan)	9	Elvin Mammadov	1	1	2	4
4	DF	(Azerbaijan)	6	Rashad Sadygov	1	1	2	4
7	MF	(Azerbaijan)	8	Aslan Kerimov	3	0	0	3
7	MF	(Azerbaijan)	10	Emin Imamaliev	2	1	0	3
7	FW	(Azerbaijan)	17	Vugar Nadirov	2	0	1	3
10	MF	(Azerbaijan)	14	Rashad Sadiqov	2	0	0	2
10	DF	(Albania)	24	Admir Teli	1	1	0	2
12	DF	(Azerbaijan)	2	Elnur Allahverdiyev	1	0	0	1
12	DF	(Azerbaijan)	3	Aftandil Hajiyev	0	1	0	1
				TOTALS	31	6	5	42

=== Disciplinary record ===
Number	Nation	Position	Name	Premier League		Azerbaijan Cup		Europa League		Total	
Number	Nation	Position	Name	Yellow card	Red card	Yellow card	Red card	Yellow card	Red card	Yellow card	Red card
1	(Azerbaijan)	GK	Farhad Veliyev	1	0	0	0	1	0	2	0
2	(Azerbaijan)	DF	Elnur Allahverdiyev	11	1	0	0	3	0	14	1
3	(Azerbaijan)	DF	Aftandil Hajiyev	1	0	0	0	0	0	1	0
4	(Azerbaijan)	DF	Zaur Hashimov	4	0	0	0	1	0	5	0
5	(Azerbaijan)	DF	Maksim Medvedev	11	0	0	0	1	0	12	0
6	(Azerbaijan)	DF	Rashad Sadygov	8	0	0	0	0	0	8	0
7	(Azerbaijan)	MF	Namiq Yusifov	6	0	0	0	0	0	6	0
8	(Azerbaijan)	MF	Aslan Kerimov	8	0	0	0	0	0	8	0
9	(Azerbaijan)	MF	Elvin Mammadov	5	0	0	0	2	0	7	0
10	(Azerbaijan)	MF	Emin Imamaliev	2	0	0	0	1	0	3	0
11	(Azerbaijan)	FW	Rauf Aliyev	4	0	0	0	0	0	4	0
14	(Azerbaijan)	MF	Rashad Sadigov	2	0	0	0	0	0	2	0
15	(Azerbaijan)	MF	Aykhan Abbasov	4	1	0	0	1	0	5	1
17	(Azerbaijan)	FW	Vügar Nadirov	8	0	0	0	0	0	8	0
22	(Azerbaijan)	MF	Afran Ismayilov	4	0	0	0	1	0	5	0
24	(Albania)	DF	Admir Teli	8	1	0	0	1	0	9	1
	(Azerbaijan)	DF	Nodar Mammadov	1	0	0	0	0	0	1	0
	(Georgia (country))	FW	Giorgi Adamia	2	0	0	0	0	0	2	0
	(Azerbaijan)	FW	Tural Isgandarov	1	0	0	0	0	0	1	0
			TOTALS	77	3	0	0	12	0	89	3
