= 2009–10 Azerbaijan Cup =

Association football competition

Tournament details
- Country: Azerbaijan
- Teams: 16

Final positions
- Champions: Baku
- Runners-up: Khazar Lankaran
- UEFA Europa League: Baku

Tournament statistics
- Matches played: 29
- Goals scored: 93 (3.21 per match)
- Top goal scorer(s): Mario Sergio, Khazar Lankaran (4)

The Azerbaijan Cup 2009–10 was the 18th season of the annual cup competition in Azerbaijan. It started on 17 September 2009 with four games of the preliminary round and ended on 22 May 2009 with the Final held at Tofiq Bahramov Stadium in Baku. FK Karabakh were the defending champions. Twenty teams competed in this year's competition.

== Preliminary round ==
Eight lower division teams qualified for this competition played against each other over two legs and the winners of these legs joined the twelve teams of the Azerbaijan Premier League 2009–10 in the next round. The first legs were played on 17 September 2009 and the second legs were played on 22 and 23 September 2009.

Team 1	Agg.	Team 2	1st leg	2nd leg
Ganca	3–1	Ravan Baku	1–1	2–0
ANSAD-Petrol	3–4	Sahdag Qasar	1–1	2–3
FK MKT-Araz	2–5	Bakili Baku	1–3	1–2
MOIK Baku	2–3	Neftchi ISM	2–1	0–2

== First round ==
The four winners from the preliminary round joined the 12 teams of the Azerbaijan Premier League 2009–10 in this round. The first legs took place on 4 and 5 November 2009 and the second legs took take place on 11 and 12 November 2009.

Team 1	Agg.	Team 2	1st leg	2nd leg
Simurq	3–0	FK Ganca	2–0	1–0
Olimpik-Shuvalan	2–1	Qäbälä	2–0	0–1
Qarabağ	4–0	Sahdag Qasar	4–0	0–0
Khazar Lankaran	4–1	Mughan	3–1	1–0
Baku	6–0	Bakili Baku	6–0	0–0
Standard Sumgayit	3–1	Turan Tovuz	3–1	0–0
Neftchi Baku	7–0	Neftchi ISM	5–0	2–0
Inter Baku	7–2	Karvan	4–0	3–2

== Quarterfinals ==
The eight winners from the first round matched up in this round. The first legs took place on 6 and 7 March 2010 and the second legs took place on 17 and 18 March 2010.

Team 1	Agg.	Team 2	1st leg	2nd leg
Simurq	0–0 (2–4 p.)	Olimpik-Shuvalan	0–0	0–0 (aet)
Qarabağ	2–2 (a)	Khazar Lankaran	2–1	0–1
Baku	4–2	Standard Sumgayit	1–1	3–1
Neftchi Baku	1–5	Inter Baku	0–3	1–2

== Semifinals ==
The four winners from the Quarterfinals matched up in this round. The first legs took place on 27 April 2010 and the second legs took place on 5 and 6 May 2010.

Team 1	Agg.	Team 2	1st leg	2nd leg
Olimpik-Shuvalan	2–3	Khazar Lankaran	1–1	1–2
Baku	3–2	Inter Baku	0–1	3–1

== Final ==
The two winners from the Semifinals matched up in this match.

23 May 2010
20:00 AZST (UTC+5)

Khazar Lankaran	1–2 (a.e.t.)	Baku
Beqiri 120'	Summary	Skulić 100'; Šolić 104'

Tofiq Bahramov Stadium, Baku
Attendance: 26,000
Referee: Elchin Mämmädov

== Scorers ==
4 goals:

- Mario Sergio, Khazar Lankaran

3 goals:

- Aleksandar Šolić, Baku
- Samir Aliyev, Neftchi Baku
- Farid Guliyev, Standard Baku

2 goals:

- Jabá, Baku
- Felipe, Baku
- Amiran Mujiri, Baku/Standard Baku
- Robertas Poškus, Inter Baku
- Asif Mammadov, Inter Baku
- Bronislav Červenka, Inter Baku
- Vital Lyadzyanyow, Inter Baku
- Marian Aliuță, Neftchi Baku
- Walter Guglielmone, Neftchi Baku
- Anatolie Doroș, Olimpik-Shuvalan

1 goals:

- Fábio Luís Ramim, Baku
- Nijat Abdullayev, Baku
- Orkhan Bashirli, Baku
- Ernad Skulić, Baku
- Veaceslav Sofroni, Baku
- Ahmad Tijani, Baku
- Kenan Kerimov, Gabala
- Leo Rocha, Inter Baku
- David Odikadze, Inter Baku
- Ģirts Karlsons, Inter Baku
- Ángel Gutiérrez, Inter Baku
- Yacouba Bamba, FK Karvan
- Bechir Mogaadi, FK Karvan
- Kalinkov, Khazar Lankaran
- Elvin Beqiri, Khazar Lankaran
- Cristian, Khazar Lankaran
- Allan Lalín, Khazar Lankaran
- Emeka Opara, Khazar Lankaran
- Denis Calincov, Khazar Lankaran
- Narcisse Yaméogo, Mughan
- Amit Guluzade, Neftchi Baku
- Ilgar Gurbanov, Olimpik-Shuvalan
- Mirko Bunjevčević, Olimpik-Shuvalan
- Admir Teli, Qarabağ
- Aftandil Hajiyev, Qarabağ
- Emin Imamaliev, Qarabağ
- Vagif Javadov, Qarabağ
- Elvin Mammadov, Qarabağ
- Rashad Sadygov, Qarabağ
- Rüstam Mammadov, Simurq
- Serhiy Artiukh, Simurq
- Yuri Bulychev, Simurq
- Ugo, Standard Baku
- Anton Kovalevskyi, Turan Tovuz

Unknown:

- 5 Goals Bakili Baku
- 4 Goals Sahdag Qusar
- 3 Goals ANSAD-Petrol
- 3 Goals Ganca
- 3 Goals Neftchi ISM
- 2 Goals FK MKT Araz
- 2 Goals MOIK Baku
- 1 Goals Ravan Baku

2 Own goals:

- Ernani Pereira, FK Karvan against Inter Baku

1 Own goal:

- Milan Zagorac, Inter Baku against Baku
