= Rafael Barbosa =

Rafael Barbosa may refer to:

- Rafael Paula Barbosa (1926–2007), Bissau-Guinean political activist
- Rafael Barbosa (footballer, born 1983), Brazilian football defender
- Rafael Barbosa (footballer, born 1996), Portuguese football attacking midfielder
