= Daniel Martínez (footballer, born 1981) =

Uruguayan footballer (born 1981)

Personal information
- Full name: Daniel Sebastián Martínez Álvarez
- Date of birth: August 16, 1981 (age 45)
- Place of birth: Montevideo, Uruguay
- Position: Striker

Team information
- Current team: Plaza Colonia
- Number: 9

Senior career*
Years	Team	Apps	(Gls)
2001	Peñarol		
2002	Juventud		
2003–2004	La Luz		
2005	Huachipato		
2005	La Luz		
2006	Municipal Valencia		
2006–2007	La Luz		
2007–2008	Standard Baku	29	(6)
2009	Plaza Colonia		
2010	El Tanque Sisley		
2010	Colegiales		
2011	Durazno		
2011–2012	Unión Magdalena	23	(26)
2013–	Plaza Colonia		
- * Club domestic league appearances and goals as of 24 August 2013 ‡ National team caps and goals as of 24 August 2013

Daniel Sebastián Martínez Álvarez (Note: In this Spanish name, the first or paternal surname is Martínez and the second or maternal family name is Álvarez.) (born August 16, 1981, in Montevideo), known as Daniel Martínez, is an Uruguayan footballer currently playing for Unión Magdalena in the Categoría Primera B of Colombia.

== Azerbaijan career statistics ==
Club performance			League		Cup		Continental		Total	
Season	Club	League	Apps	Goals	Apps	Goals	Apps	Goals	Apps	Goals
Azerbaijan			League		Azerbaijan Cup		Europe		Total	
2007-08	Standard Baku	Azerbaijan Premier League	24	6			-		24	6
2008-09	Standard Baku	Azerbaijan Premier League	5	0			-		5	0
Total	Azerbaijan		29	6			0	0	29	6
Career total			29	6			0	0	29	6

== Honours ==
=== Club ===
El Tanque Sisley

- 2009-2010 Uruguayan Segunda División champion

=== Individual ===
- 2009-2010 Uruguayan Segunda División goalscorer (10 goals)
