= Haji Ahmadov =

Azerbaijani football defender (born 1993)

Personal information
- Full name: Haji Ahmad oglu Ahmadov
- Date of birth: 23 November 1993 (age 32)
- Place of birth: Baku, Azerbaijan
- Height: 1.75 m (5 ft 9 in)
- Position: Defender

Team information
- Current team: AZAL
- Number: 23

Senior career*
Years	Team	Apps	(Gls)
2009–2012	Baku	3	(0)
2011–2012	→ Sumgayit (loan)	21	(0)
2012–2015	Qarabağ	38	(0)
2015	Zira	6	(0)
2016–2017	AZAL	17	(1)
2017–	Zagatala	0	(0)

International career^{‡}
2007–2009	Azerbaijan U17	3	(1)
2009–2012	Azerbaijan U19	7	(0)
2012–	Azerbaijan U21	0	(0)
2012–	Azerbaijan	2	(0)
- * Club domestic league appearances and goals as of 30 September 2017 ‡ National team caps and goals as of 5 March 2012

Haji Ahmadov (Azerbaijani: Hacı Əhmədov, born on 23 November 1993 in Baku) is an Azerbaijani football defender who plays for Zagatala.

== Career ==
Ahmadov left Qarabağ at the end of the 2014–15 season.

== Career statistics ==
As of 23 February 2015

Club	Season	League		Cup		Europe		Total	
Club	Season	Apps	Goals	Apps	Goals	Apps	Goals	Apps	Goals
Baku	2009–10	3	0	2	0	0	0	5	0
Baku	2010–11	0	0	0	0	0	0	0	0
Sumgayit (loan)	2011–12	21	0	1	0	—	—	22	0
Qarabağ	2012–13	8	0	3	0	—	—	11	0
Qarabağ	2013–14	16	0	1	0	0	0	17	0
Qarabağ	2014–15	13	0	4	0	0	0	17	0
Career Total		61	0	11	0	0	0	72	0

== Achievements ==
Baku

- Azerbaijan Cup (1): 2009–10

Qarabağ

- Azerbaijan Premier League (2): 2013–14, 2014–15
- Azerbaijan Cup (1): 2014–15
