= Adriano (footballer, born 1980) =

Brazilian footballer

Personal information
- Full name: Adriano Padilha Nascimento
- Date of birth: 20 June 1980 (age 46)
- Place of birth: Alegrete, Brazil
- Height: 1.85 m (6 ft 1 in)
- Position: Forward

Senior career*
Years	Team	Apps	(Gls)
1999–2000	Grêmio		
2001	São José		
2002	Ituano		
2003	Gama		
2003	Avaí		
2004	América de Natal		
2005	Atlético de Ibirama		
2005	→ Figueirense (loan)		
2006–2007	FC Saturn	6	(0)
2006–2007	→ Denizlispor (loan)	28	(7)
2007–2009	İstanbul BB	48	(9)
2009	Paraná	19	(1)
2010	FK Baku	7	(1)
2010	Metropolitano	2	(0)
2010	Atlético Sorocaba	3	(1)
2011–2012	Atlético de Ibirama	18	(8)
2012	Caxias	9	(3)
2013	Atlético de Ibirama	10	(1)
2013	Marcílio Dias	1	(0)
2014–2015	Atlético de Ibirama	17	(4)
- * Club domestic league appearances and goals

Adriano Padilha Nascimento (born 20 June 1980), known as Adriano, is a Brazilian former professional footballer who played as a forward.

== Career ==
In January 2006 Adriano signed for Russian Premier League team FC Saturn on a four-year contract. After spending the 2006–07 season on loan at Süper Lig side Denizlispor, Adriano signed for fellow Süper Lig team İstanbul BB.

After a brief return to Brazil with Paraná, Adriano signed a two-year contract with FK Baku in the Azerbaijan Premier League.

In May 2013 Adriano signed for Marcílio Dias.

== Career statistics ==
Appearances and goals by club, season and competition
Club	Season	League			Cup		Continental		Total	
Club	Season	Division	Apps	Goals	Apps	Goals	Apps	Goals	Apps	Goals
Saturn Ramenskoye	2006	Russian Premier League	6	0	2	0	–		8	0
Denizlispor (loan)	2006–07	Süper Lig	28	7	1	0	–		29	7
İstanbul BB	2007–08	Süper Lig	29	6	1	1	–		30	7
İstanbul BB	2008–09	Süper Lig	19	3	1	0	–		20	7
FK Baku	2009–10	Azerbaijan Premier League	7	1	1	0	–		8	1
Career total			89	21	6	1	0	0	94	22

== Honours ==
Grêmio

- Campeonato Gaúcho: 1999

Ituano

- Campeonato Paulista: 2002
