= Cristian (footballer, born 1979) =

Brazilian footballer

Personal information
- Full name: Cristian Martins Cabral
- Date of birth: 28 August 1979 (age 47)
- Place of birth: Uruguaiana, Brazil
- Height: 1.75 m (5 ft 9 in)
- Position: Attacking midfielder

Senior career*
Years	Team	Apps	(Gls)
1999–2000	Velo Clube		
2001	Guarani		
2002–2003	Juventus		
2004	Ituano		
2004	Paraná	30	(7)
2005–2007	Palmeiras	52	(2)
2006	→ Coritiba (loan)	27	(5)
2007	→ Náutico (loan)	4	(1)
2007	→ Fortaleza (loan)	16	(1)
2008	Paraná	14	(2)
2009	Vitória	0	(0)
2009	Fortaleza	20	(2)
2010	Ituano	0	(0)
2010	Khazar Lankaran	22	(1)
2011	Bragantino	0	(0)
2011–2012	Itumbiara	6	(1)
2012	Treze	14	(2)
2013	Cerâmica	12	(0)
2013	Treze	16	(3)
2014–2015	Ituano	9	(1)
2015	→ Ponte Preta (loan)	13	(0)
2016	Ponte Preta	9	(0)
2016–2017	Paraná	5	(0)
2017	Velo Clube	0	(0)
2017	Mogi Mirim	6	(0)
2018	Aparecidense	0	(0)
2019	Santo André	0	(0)
2019	Ferroviária	5	(0)
2020	Santo André	0	(0)
- * Club domestic league appearances and goals

Cristian Martins Cabral (born 28 August 1979), simply known as Cristian, is a Brazilian former footballer who played as an attacking midfielder.

== Career ==
=== Early career ===
Cristian started his professional career on Velo Clube, a club from Rio Claro, São Paulo. During the period of 1999-2004 he got some highlight while playing the Campeonato Paulista, which lately earned him spells in other traditional clubs such as Guarani, Juventus and Ituano.

Playing for Ituano, where he played the Campeonato Brasileiro Serie B, he started to get the spotlights. In 2004, he was then sold to Paraná.

=== Paraná ===
Hired by the club, Cristian soon started to highlight himself in the team, where he played the Campeonato Paranaense, Campeonato Brasileiro Serie A and Copa Sudamericana of that year.

Besides of Paraná's only regular season in Serie A, it was in the club where his career was launched on national range. Due to his performance and regularity on that year, he was nominated for Bola de Prata (Silver Ball) award by Placar Magazine as best midfielder.

His good plays soon drew attention of big Brazilian clubs and also from Europe, which disputed his hiring. Until finally in January 2005 he was hired by Palmeiras.

Cristian would return to Paraná in 2008, where he played the Campeonato Paranaense and Campeonato Brasileiro Serie B of that year.

=== Palmeiras ===
On Palmeiras, Cristian arrived as a big promise due to his performance on last year. During his spell in the club, he played the Campeonato Paulista in 2005 and 2006; Campeonato Brasileiro Serie A and Copa Libertadores.

The player always had good presentations while playing for the club. However, due to the 1st team concurrence (specially with Juninho Paulista) he ended up not being much used and by the second half of 2006 he went to Coritiba on loan.

=== Coritiba ===
Cristian arrived on Coritiba with the mission to return the club to the Serie A of Campeonato Brasileiro, because the club was relegated to Serie B in 2005. The player was one of the most important players in the squad and was constantly criticized by Coritiba fans (sometimes in excess). However, on that year the club ended up in 6th and was not promoted to Serie A again. Cristian did not have his contract renewed and was then repassed on loan to Náutico.

=== Fortaleza ===
After a brief spell on Náutico, where he played the Copa do Brasil and was not much used on 1st team, Cristian was repassed on loan to Fortaleza. Just like in past clubs, he was one of the main players of the squad, also with the mission to return the club to the Serie A of Campeonato Brasileiro. Even with good presentations on Serie B, the club was not promoted to Serie A, ending on 5th place.

The player would return in 2009 to play the Serie B. An injury messed up with his second spell on the club and the team had a bad season, ending on 18th place and being relegated to Serie C.

=== Khazar Lankaran ===
In 2010, Cristian had his first experience abroad playing for FK Khazar Lankaran from Azerbaijan. At the club, which already had some Brazilian players on the squad, he played the 2009–10 Azerbaijan Premier League and the 2009–10 Azerbaijan Cup. In the Cup, FK Khazar Lankaran finished as runner-up, getting a slot to the 1st qualifying round of 2010–11 UEFA Europa League.

=== Itumbiara ===
After returning from Azerbaijan, Cristian had a brief spell on Bragantino, where he played the Campeonato Paulista in 2011. In the same year, he moved to Itumbiara. At the club, he played 3 important competitions for the team: the 2nd Division of Campeonato Goiano, where the club was the runner-up and thus reaching the main division; Campeonato Brasileiro Serie D in 2011, where the club reached the round of 16; and the 1st Division of Campeonato Goiano in 2012, where the club finished in 5th place.

=== Treze ===
Cristian arrived on Treze for the Campeonato Brasileiro Serie C of 2012. There he rapidly became the club's playmaker, creating the main plays and doing several assistances for goals. The club finished the competition in 5th place on group stage and did not reach playoffs, but stayed on Serie C for next year.

After a brief spell on Cerâmica, the player returned to the club for the Serie C of 2013. Captain and considered the best player on squad, Cristian led the team during the season which took the club to Quarter Finals, being beaten by Vila Nova and thus losing a slot to access Serie B in 2014.

== Honours ==
Vitória

- Campeonato Baiano: 2009

Ituano

- Campeonato Paulista: 2014
