= Mihai Panc =

Romanian footballer

Personal information
- Date of birth: 7 April 1981 (age 45)
- Place of birth: Reșița, Romania
- Height: 1.87 m (6 ft 2 in)
- Position: Defender

Youth career
- –1997: Gloria Reșița

Senior career*
Years	Team	Apps	(Gls)
1997–1998	Gloria Reșița	8	(2)
1998–2002	Extensiv Craiova	75	(7)
2002–2003	Steaua București	4	(0)
2003–2008	Progresul București	89	(2)
2008	Gloria Bistriţa	10	(0)
2009–2010	Baku	10	(0)
2010–2011	Politehnica Iași	20	(1)
Total		216	(12)
- * Club domestic league appearances and goals

Mihai Panc (born 7 April 1981) is a former Romanian professional footballer who played as a defender.

== Playing career ==
Panc started out at local club Gloria Reșița. He made eight appearances during this stint, scoring two goals, before moving to Extensiv Craiova. His performances at Extensiv earned him a move to Steaua București, where he would make only four appearances before moving again, this time to Progresul București. After a brief spell at Gloria Bistriţa, making 10 appearances, he moved to FK Baku.

His debut in Liga I came on 4 March 2000, against Dinamo București.

== Honours ==
Extensiv Craiova

- Divizia B: 1998–99

Național București

- Cupa României runner-up: 2005–06

Baku

- Azerbaijan Cup: 2009–10
