= Kürşat Duymuş =

Turkish footballer

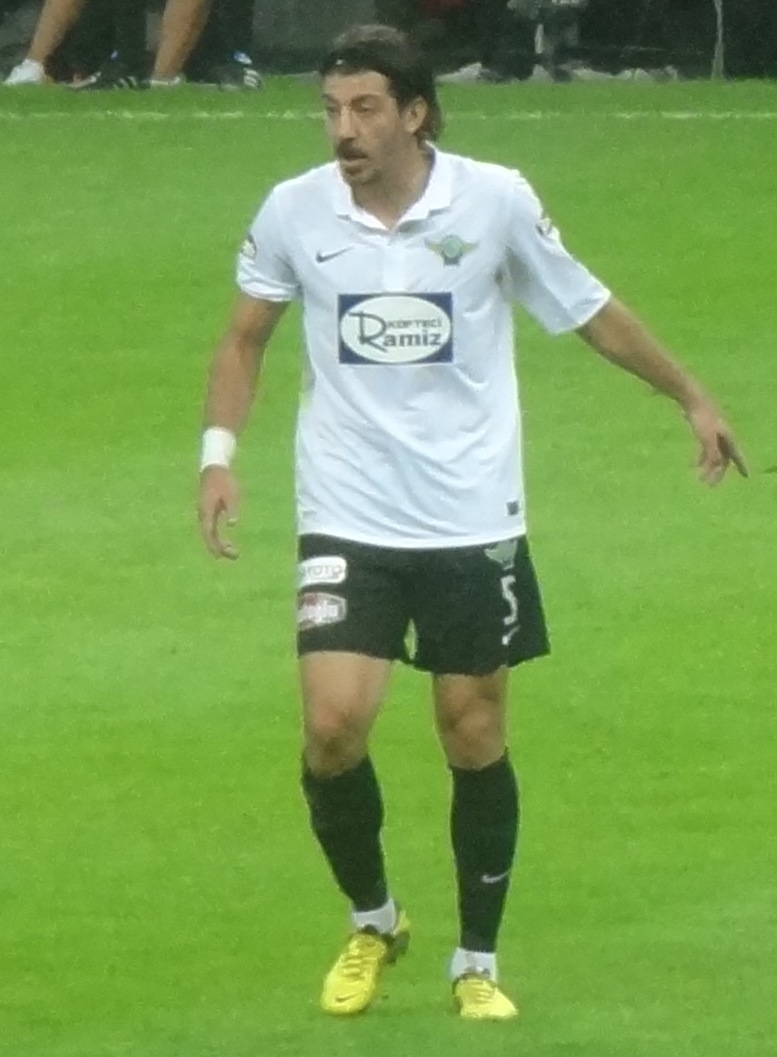

Personal information
- Full name: Kürşat Duymuş
- Date of birth: 1 February 1979 (age 47)
- Place of birth: Muş, Turkey
- Height: 1.88 m (6 ft 2 in)
- Position: Defender

Senior career*
Years	Team	Apps	(Gls)
1997–1998	Şekerspor	9	(0)
1998–2005	Çaykur Rizespor	172	(6)
2002	→ Trabzonspor (loan)	12	(0)
2005	Beşiktaş	1	(0)
2005–2006	Trabzonspor	10	(2)
2006–2007	Ankaraspor	22	(1)
2007	Kayseri Erciyesspor	14	(0)
2007–2009	Çaykur Rizespor	24	(1)
2009–2010	Kartalspor	23	(1)
2010	Baku	10	(2)
2010–2011	Orduspor	31	(0)
2011–2013	Akhisar Belediyespor	37	(1)

International career
1998	Turkey U18	2	(0)
2000–2001	Turkey U21	18	(1)
2004	Turkey A2	1	(0)
2004	Turkey	2	(0)
- * Club domestic league appearances and goals

Kürşat Duymuş (born 1 February 1979 in Muş, Turkey) is a retired Turkish football defender.

Duymuş previously played for Şekerspor, Çaykur Rizespor, Ankaraspor, Beşiktaş, Trabzonspor, Kayseri Erciyesspor and Orduspor.
