= Amiran Mujiri =

Georgian footballer

Personal information
- Full name: Amiran Mujiri
- Date of birth: 20 February 1974 (age 52)
- Place of birth: Batumi, Georgia
- Height: 1.79 m (5 ft 10 in)
- Position: Midfielder

Senior career*
Years	Team	Apps	(Gls)
1991–1997	Dinamo Batumi	142	(27)
1997–1998	Maccabi Petah Tikva	24	(2)
1998–1999	Hapoel Jerusalem	9	(1)
1999	Dinamo Tbilisi	9	(1)
1999–2001	Dinamo Batumi	48	(16)
2001–2004	Marek Dupnitsa	60	(16)
2004–2005	CSKA Sofia	36	(5)
2005–2006	Kallithea	7	(0)
2006	Anorthosis Famagusta	10	(2)
2006–2007	Dinamo Batumi	8	(3)
2007–2010	FK Baku	51	(15)
2010	Standard Sumgayit	10	(1)
2011–2015	Dinamo Batumi	70	(12)
Total		484	(101)

International career
1997–1998	Georgia	2	(0)
- * Club domestic league appearances and goals

Amiran Mujiri (born 20 February 1974) is a former Georgian footballer who played as a central midfielder. Most recently he was the head coach of Betlemi Keda.

Mujiri has become a legendary player in the history of Dinamo Batumi, where he spent 14 full seasons in four spells and played 268 matches. Overall, he had a 25-year-long career at ten clubs in six different countries.

== Career ==
Mujiri made his debut at Batumi in the second season of Umaglesi Liga in 1991. During the first seven years, he was an integral part of the team involved in a fierce competition against Dinamo Tbilisi for the Cup title. As the club repeatedly took part in UEFA Cup competitions, Mujiri scored a memorable goal against Dick Advocaat's PSV Eindhoven in a 1–1 draw in 1996.

Following a two-year tenure in Israel, he returned home in 1999.

He signed for CSKA Sofia in December 2003. Mujiri became a regular in the 2004–05 season, playing 28 games in the A PFG, and two in the UEFA Cup first round. Mujiri left for Kallithea in end of the season, but in January 2006, he moved to Greek Cyprus for Anorthosis Famagusta. Following short spells in hometown club Dinamo Batumi, Mujiri played for Baku between 2007 and 2010.

Mujiri moved back to his home club for the fourth time in 2011 when the latter was participating in the 2nd division. In a press interview, the new captain pledged to help the team climb back to the top tier and expressed his readiness to play as long as the club needed. Four years later, with Dinamo securing the silver medals of the national league, 41-year-old Mujiri announced his retirement. On 22 May 2015, as a captain he led the team with his N74 shirt for the last time against Shukura Kobuleti. His farewell ceremony was held on 30 August 2015.

Following the departure of Levan Khomeriki from Dinamo Batumi, Amiran Mujiri was appointed as an interim coach in May 2017.

In early 2023, he took charge of the Liga 4 side Betlemi Keda and led the team to promotion. Mujiri along with his assistants left the club in April 2024.

=== International career ===
Mujiri made his debut for Georgia on 29 March 1997 against Armenia.

== Honours ==
Dinamo Tbilisi

- Umaglesi Liga: 1998–99

CSKA Sofia

- Bulgarian A Group: 2004–05

FK Baku

- Azerbaijan Premier League: 2008–09

== Personal life ==
Mujiri is married with three children, including twin sons.
