= Elvin Mammadov =

Azerbaijani footballer (born 1988)

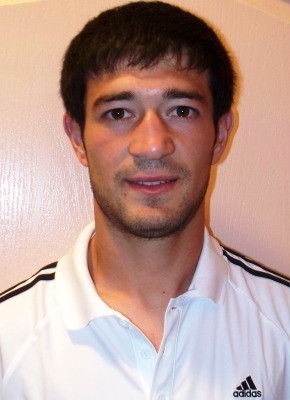

Personal information
- Full name: Elvin Nasraddin oglu Mammadov
- Date of birth: 18 July 1988 (age 38)
- Place of birth: Tovuz, Azerbaijan SSR
- Height: 1.75 m (5 ft 9 in)
- Position: Attacking midfielder

Youth career
- Turan Tovuz

Senior career*
Years	Team	Apps	(Gls)
2005–2007	Turan Tovuz	47	(3)
2007–2009	Inter Baku	27	(5)
2009–2011	Qarabağ	57	(2)
2011–2014	Baku	73	(3)
2014–2015	Inter Baku	25	(2)
2015	Qarabağ	13	(1)
2016–2017	Zira	40	(5)
2017–2018	Gabala	11	(2)
2018–2019	Sumgayit	15	(2)
2019–2020	Zira	10	(0)
2020–2022	Sumgayit	29	(0)
2022–2023	Shamakhi	29	(0)
Total		376	(25)

International career^{‡}
2004–2006	Azerbaijan U17	6	(0)
2006–2008	Azerbaijan U19	9	(0)
2008–2010	Azerbaijan U21	8	(0)
2008–2017	Azerbaijan	37	(7)

Managerial career
- 2024: Sabail (interim)
- 2025: Sabail
- * Club domestic league appearances and goals as of 25 December 2025 ‡ National team caps and goals as of 3 June 2016

Elvin Mammadov (Azerbaijani: Elvin Məmmədov; born on 18 July 1988) is an Azerbaijani association football coach and former player who played in the attacking midfielder position.

== Career ==
On 24 May 2014, Mammadov signed a one-year contract with Inter Baku.

On 28 January 2016, Mammadov signed a six-month contract with Zira. On 5 June 2017, Mammadov signed a one-year contract with Gabala FK.

On 11 June 2018, Mammadov signed a one-year contract with Sumgayit FK. On 28 May 2019, Mammadov signed a two-year contract with Zira FK. On 2 February 2020, Mammadov left Zira by mutual consent.

On 20 August 2020, he signed one-year contract with Sumgayit FK.

=== Coaching ===
After finishing his career, Mammadov began working as a coach. He became the head coach of the U-19 team of Sabail. On 6 November 2024 he was appointed as the interim head coach of the club's main team and held this position until November 11, 2024. On March 17, 2025, Elvin Mammadov was assigned as the head coach of Sabail until the end of the 2024/25 season. He resigned from his position at the club on 27 November 2025.

Elvin Mammadov was appointed as the head coach of U-17 team of the Neftçi PFK in January 2026.

== Career statistics ==
=== Club ===
As of match played 19 December 2019

Appearances and goals by club, season and competition
Club	Season	League			National Cup		Continental		Other		Total	
Club	Season	Division	Apps	Goals	Apps	Goals	Apps	Goals	Apps	Goals	Apps	Goals
Turan Tovuz	2005–06	Azerbaijan Premier League	12	1			-		-		12	1
Turan Tovuz	2006–07	Azerbaijan Premier League	22	1			-		-		22	1
Turan Tovuz	2007–08	Azerbaijan Premier League	13	1			-		-		13	1
Turan Tovuz	Total		47	3			-	-	-	-	47	3
Inter Baku	2007–08	Azerbaijan Premier League	9	1			-		-		9	1
Inter Baku	2008–09	Azerbaijan Premier League	18	4			3	0	-		21	4
Inter Baku	Total		27	5			3	0	-	-	30	5
Qarabağ	2009–10	Azerbaijan Premier League	28	1			6	2	-		34	3
Qarabağ	2010–11	Azerbaijan Premier League	29	1	1	0	5	0	-		35	1
Qarabağ	Total		57	2	1	0	11	2	-	-	69	4
Baku	2011–12	Azerbaijan Premier League	19	0	3	0	-		-		22	0
Baku	2012–13	Azerbaijan Premier League	28	2	5	0	2	0	-		35	2
Baku	2013–14	Azerbaijan Premier League	26	1	1	0	-		-		27	1
Baku	Total		73	3	9	0	2	0	-	-	84	3
Inter Baku	2014–15	Azerbaijan Premier League	25	2	4	1	1	1	–		30	4
Qarabağ	2015–16	Azerbaijan Premier League	13	1	0	0	6	0	–		19	1
Zira	2015–16	Azerbaijan Premier League	15	2	0	0	–		–		15	2
Zira	2016–17	Azerbaijan Premier League	25	3	3	0	–		–		28	3
Zira	Total		40	5	3	0	-	-	-	-	43	5
Gabala	2017–18	Azerbaijan Premier League	11	2	1	0	3	0	–		15	2
Sumgayit	2018–19	Azerbaijan Premier League	15	2	3	0	–		–		18	2
Zira	2019–20	Azerbaijan Premier League	10	0	3	1	–		–		13	1
Career total			321	25	24	2	26	1	-	-	368	28

=== National team ===
Azerbaijan national team
Year	Apps	Goals
2008	7	1
2009	9	2
2010	8	4
2011	3	0
2012	1	0
2013	1	0
Total	29	7

=== International goals ===
#	Date	Venue	Opponent	Score	Result	Competition
1.	15 October 2008	Al Muharraq Stadium, Arad, Bahrain	Bahrain	1-2	1-2	Friendly
2.	5 September 2009	Lankaran City Stadium, Lankaran, Azerbaijan	Finland	1-0	1-2	2010 WC qualification
3.	10 October 2009	Rheinpark Stadion, Vaduz, Liechtenstein	Liechtenstein	0-2	0-2	2010 WC qualification
4.	3 March 2010	Stade Josy Barthel, Luxembourg (city), Luxembourg	Luxembourg	1-2	1-2	Friendly
5.	26 May 2010	Sportzentrum Seekirchen, Seekirchen, Austria	Moldova	1-0	1-1	Friendly
6.	29 May 2010	Sportplatz Bischofshofen, Bischofshofen, Austria	Macedonia	1-3	1-3	Friendly
7.	11 August 2010	Tofik Bakhramov Stadium, Baku, Azerbaijan	Kuwait	1-0	1-1	Friendly
Correct as of 7 October 2015

== Honours ==
Inter Baku

- Azerbaijan Premier League (1): 2007–08
