= Wênio =

Brazilian footballer

Personal information
- Full name: Wênio Moraes Pio
- Date of birth: 9 September 1979 (age 47)
- Place of birth: Mineiros, Brazil
- Height: 1.76 m (5 ft 9 1/2 in)
- Position: Midfielder

Senior career*
Years	Team	Apps	(Gls)
2002	Corinthians Alagoano	29	(4)
2002–2008	Marítimo	143	(3)
2003–2008	Marítimo B	6	(2)
2008–2009	Vitória Guimarães	16	(0)
2009	Leixões	11	(0)
2010	FC Baku	11	(1)
2011	Morrinhos		
2011	Araguaína		
2011	Mineiros		
2012	CRB		
2012	Corinthians Alagoano	2	(0)
2012	Mineiros	?	(1)
2013	Corinthians Alagoano	0	(0)
2013	Chã Grande	5	(0)
2013	Mineiros	?	(2)
2014	Costa Rica-MS		
2014	Araguaína		
2014	Mineiros	7	(1)
- * Club domestic league appearances and goals

Wênio Moraes Pio (born 9 September 1979), known simply as Wênio, is a Brazilian former footballer who played as a defensive midfielder.

He usually sported a distinctive peroxide blonde hair, and spent most of his professional career in Portugal, amassing Primeira Liga totals of 170 games and three goals over the course of eight seasons, mainly in representation of Marítimo.

== Football career ==
Born in Mineiros, Goiás, Wênio was relatively unknown when he signed for Marítimo from Corinthians Alagoano in 2002. However, he went on to become an essential midfield element for the Madeira club, appearing in 30 Primeira Liga games in the 2003–04 campaign as it achieved a final UEFA Cup spot. On 12 November 2007 he scored a rare goal, in a 2–0 derby away win against Nacional.

In June 2008, Wênio signed a three-year contract with Vitória Guimarães. After one season – and 16 top division matches – he was released, joining fellow league side Leixões shortly after.

After a brieft stint in Azerbaijan with FC Baku, Wênio returned to his country and region and signed with amateurs Morrinhos. He continued to play in Brazil's lower leagues in the following years.
