= Cristian Muscalu =

Romanian footballer

Personal information
- Full name: Cristian Valentin Muscalu
- Date of birth: 3 October 1989 (age 37)
- Place of birth: Bucharest, Romania
- Height: 1.81 m (5 ft 11 in)
- Positions: Left winger; midfielder

Youth career
- 1995–2003: Steaua București
- 2004–2005: Şcoala de Fotbal Gică Popescu
- 2005–2006: CSŞ Nucet
- 2006–2007: 1. FC Köln

Senior career*
| Years | Team | Apps | (Gls) |
| 2007 | Jiul Petroșani | 0 | (0) |
| 2008 | Sint-Truidense | 1 | (0) |
| 2009 | Slavija Sarajevo | 9 | (0) |
| 2009–2010 | FK Baku | 1 | (0) |
| 2010 | → Chernomorets Burgas (loan) | 8 | (0) |
| 2010 | Tur Turek | 2 | (0) |
| 2011 | Borac Čačak | 0 | (0) |
| 2011–2012 | Ceahlăul Piatra Neamţ | 15 | (1) |
| 2013 | Voždovac | 1 | (0) |
| 2014 | Beira-Mar | 4 | (0) |
| 2014–2015 | Caransebeș | 0 | (0) |
| 2015–2016 | Metalul Frăsinet | | |
| 2016–2017 | Poole Town | 2 | (0) |
| 2017 | Rapid București | 1 | (0) |

International career
| 2008 | Romania U19 | 4 | (0) |
- * Club domestic league appearances and goals

Cristian Valentin Muscalu (born 3 October 1989) is a Romanian former professional footballer who played as a midfielder.

== Club career ==
Muscalu started his youth career at Steaua spending eight years, before separating from the club, he joined Gică Popescu's football academy playing there for a year, as well for CSŞ Nucet. During 2006 he was noticed by youth coach Marcel Răducanu who sees him linked with a move to 1. FC Köln. During his early career, Muscalu was for a few weeks on trial at Osasuna, Hertha BSC and 1860 Munich.

Muscalu started as senior playing the first half of the 2007–08 season with Romanian second-level side CSM Jiul Petroșani. During winter break he moved to Belgium and signed with Sint-Truidense. He made his official debut for Sint-Truidense on 12 April 2008 in the Belgian Pro League in a 2–0 loss to Westerlo. However, a year later he was transferred to Bosnia and Herzegovina's FK Slavija to gain more experience, where he won a national cup. On 13 July 2009, he signed for FK Baku in Azerbaijan. After not having many chances, he played the last six months of that season loaned out to Chernomorets Burgas playing in the Bulgarian First League. After summer 2010, Muscalu had a short spell with Polish third-tier club Tur Turek which lasted until October. Before joining with Turek, he was also on trial with Lech Poznań and Croatian club Istra 1961.

In early 2011, he joined on a free transfer Serbian side Borac Čačak, but did not play any game. In the summer of 2011, he was close to sign for Swiss club SC Kriens however, the contract did not materialize. On July, Muscalu returned to his home country to play in Liga I with newly promoted team Ceahlăul Piatra Neamţ.

He was regarded as a good talent of Romania, but he was affected by numerous injuries.

In the summer 2013, Cristian Muscalu joined newly promoted Serbian SuperLiga side FK Voždovac. In February 2014, Muscalu signed with Beira-Mar of Portugal.

In summer 2014 Muscalu returned to Romania and has played with lower-league sides FC Caransebeș and Metalul Frăsinet.

== International career ==
Muscalu was a member of the Romanian under-19 national team.

== Honours ==
Slavija Sarajevo

- Bosnia and Herzegovina Football Cup: 2009
