= Rafael Barbosa (footballer, born 1983) =

Brazilian footballer

Personal information
- Full name: Rafael Barbosa do Nascimento
- Date of birth: 10 August 1983 (age 43)
- Place of birth: Rio de Janeiro, Brazil
- Height: 1.89 m (6 ft 2 1/2 in)
- Position: Defender

Senior career*
Years	Team	Apps	(Gls)
2003–2005	Madureira	0	(0)
2005	→ Flamengo (SP) (loan)	0	(0)
2005	Olaria	0	(0)
2006–2007	Brusque	0	(0)
2007	Iguaçu	0	(0)
2008	Rio Branco (PR)	0	(0)
2008	CFZ (RJ)	0	(0)
2009	Brusque	0	(0)
2009	Volta Redonda	0	(0)
2009	FK Baku	7	(0)
2010–2011	Slavia Sofia	1	(0)
2011	Hajer Club	11	(0)
2012	America-RJ		
- * Club domestic league appearances and goals

Rafael Barbosa do Nascimento (born 10 August 1983) is a Brazilian former footballer.

Barbosa never played in Brazil national league level, however he left for Europe in July 2009.

== Biography ==
=== Brazil state leagues ===
Born in Rio de Janeiro, Barbosa started his career with Madureira, signed a 4 1/2-year contract on 1 July 2003. He was loaned to Flamengo (SP) in 2005. In October 2005 he was signed by Olaria.

In December 2005, he signed a 1-year contract with Brusque for 2006 Campeonato Catarinense. He extended his contract in December 2006 for 2007 Campeonato Catarinense.

In June 2007, he signed a 1-year contract with Iguaçu. He played 10 out of possible 22 games of 2007 Copa Paraná . In December 2007 he left for fellow Paraná state side Rio Branco (PR) for 2008 Campeonato Paranaense, started 14 out of possible 15 league matches.

In June 2008, he was signed by CFZ of 2008 Campeonato Carioca Segunda Divisão. He played 3 times for CFZ in stage 1 of the league.

Barbosa returned to Brusque in December 2008, signed a contract until the end of 2009 Campeonato Catarinense. He played 9 league matches for Brusque, out of possible 18 matches.

In April 2009 he returned to Rio again, this time signed by Volta Redonda for Copa Rio. He made his Cup debut on 21 May, round 8 of the second stage. He played 4 times in the cup before terminated his contract on 22 June.

=== Europe ===
In July 2009 he was signed by Azerbaijani club FK Baku. He played all 4 matches for Baku in the 2009–10 UEFA Champions League qualifying rounds. He was released along with Daniel Opriţa on 16 October 2009 due to injury.

In the 2010–11 season he left for Bulgarian club Slavia Sofia.
