= Jabá =

Brazilian footballer

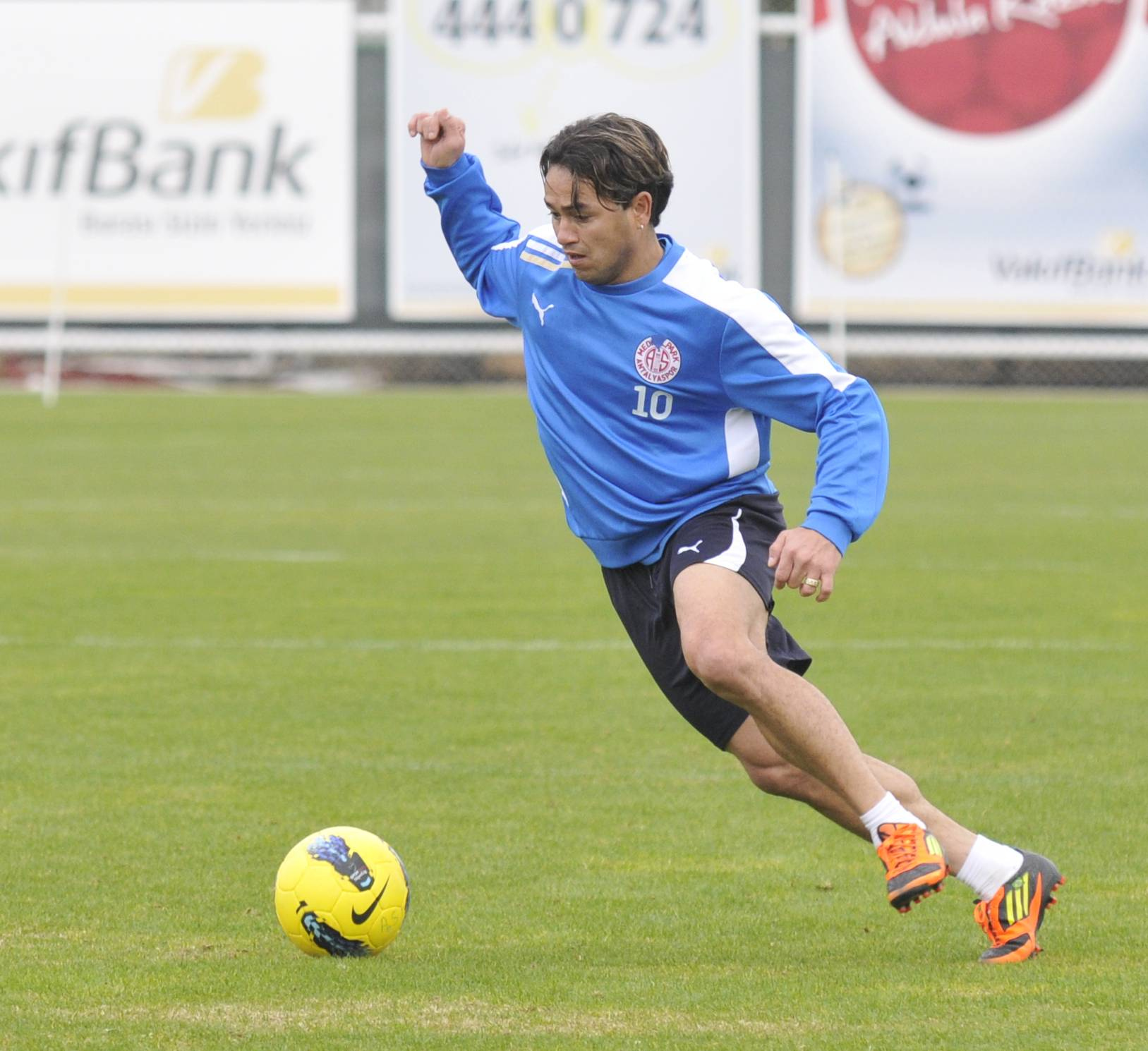

Personal information
- Full name: Silvino João de Carvalho
- Date of birth: 20 May 1981 (age 45)
- Place of birth: Araripina, Pernambuco, Brazil
- Height: 1.68 m (5 ft 6 in)
- Position: Forward

Senior career*
Years	Team	Apps	(Gls)
1998–2001	União Bandeirante		
2001–2002	Grêmio Maringá		
2002–2003	Coritiba		
2003–2006	Ankaraspor	83	(37)
2007–2009	Ankaragücü	58	(17)
2009–2012	FK Baku	60	(17)
2012	Antalyaspor	8	(1)
2013	Arapongas	8	(0)
2014	Juventus SC	17	(7)
2014–2015	FK Baku	20	(0)
2015–2016	Kuşadasıspor	20	(15)
2016	Kurtuluşspor	13	(11)
2017	Gebzespor	11	(7)
2017–2018	Somaspor	18	(4)
2019	Tupy		
2020	União Beltrão	9	(0)
2020	Altos	20	(1)

Managerial career
- 2016: Kuşadasıspor
- * Club domestic league appearances and goals

Silvino João de Carvalho (born 20 May 1981), commonly known as Jabá, is a Brazilian former professional footballer who played as a forward.

== Career ==
During the summer of 2009, Jabá moved to Azerbaijan Premier League side FC Baku. On 1 February 2012, Jabá joined Antalyaspor until the end of the season.

In October 2014, Jabá re-signed for FC Baku on a one-year contract.

== Career statistics ==
Appearances and goals by club, season and competition
Club	Season	League			Cup		Continental		Total	
Club	Season	Division	Apps	Goals	Apps	Goals	Apps	Goals	Apps	Goals
Ankaraspor	2003–04	TFF First League					–			
Ankaraspor	2004–05	Süper Lig	32	17	2	0	–		34	17
Ankaraspor	2005–06	Süper Lig	23	12	1	2			24	14
Ankaraspor	2006–07	Süper Lig	28	8	4	1	–		32	9
Ankaraspor	Total									
Ankaragücü	2007–08	Süper Lig	27	8	4	3	–		31	11
Ankaragücü	2008–09	Süper Lig	31	9	4	2	–		35	11
Ankaragücü	Total		58	17	8	5	0	0	66	22
FC Baku	2009–10	Azerbaijan Premier League	28	10	5	2	2	0	35	12
FC Baku	2010–11	Azerbaijan Premier League	25	7	5	1	2	2	32	10
FC Baku	2011–12	Azerbaijan Premier League	7	0	1	0	–		7	0
FC Baku	Total		60	17	11	3	4	2	75	22
Antalyaspor	2011–12	Süper Lig	8	1	1	0	–		9	1
FC Baku	2014–15	Azerbaijan Premier League	20	0	2	0	–		22	0
Career total			229	72	29	11	4	2	262	85
