= Felipe Félix =

Brazilian footballer (born 1985)

Personal information
- Full name: Felipe Almeida Félix
- Date of birth: 20 April 1985 (age 41)
- Place of birth: Itanhaém, Brazil
- Height: 1.97 m (6 ft 5 1/2 in)
- Position: Centre forward

Youth career
- São Paulo
- Corinthians
- Portuguesa
- Cricíuma
- 2003–2004: Atlético Paranaense

Senior career*
Years	Team	Apps	(Gls)
2005	Nazarenos		
2005–2006	Pampilhosa	22	(5)
2006	Torreense	5	(1)
2007	Odivelas	12	(2)
2007	Pampilhosa	13	(3)
2008–2010	Spartak Nalchik	19	(0)
2009	→ Baku (loan)	6	(0)
2010	→ Rio Branco-SP (loan)	4	(0)
2010–2011	Leixões	20	(2)
2011	Ferencváros	6	(1)
2012	Caldense	7	(0)
2012	Novo Hamburgo	0	(0)
2013	Novorizontino	9	(4)
2013	Consadole Sapporo	15	(4)
2014	Beijing Baxy	22	(13)
2015	Xinjiang Tianshan Leopard	11	(2)
2015	Kyoto Sanga FC	6	(0)
2018	Giravanz Kitakyushu	15	(1)
2019	Al-Orobah	0	(0)
- * Club domestic league appearances and goals

Felipe Almeida Félix (born 20 April 1985), known as Félix, is a Brazilian former footballer.

== Football career ==
Born in Itanhaém, São Paulo, Felix finished his formation with Clube Atlético Paranaense. He would only play amateur football in his country during his career, which started in Portugal with GD Os Nazarenos.

In 2008, Félix joined Russian Premier League club PFC Spartak Nalchik. He failed to score during his two-year tenure, also being loaned to Baku FC and Rio Branco Esporte Clube.

In June 2010, Spartak declared that they had no intention to reinstate Félix in the squad, but expected to receive a fee from the Brazilian side that was vying for his services. However, he eventually returned to Portugal and joined Leixões S.C. in the Segunda Liga. He scored his first goal as a professional at nearly 26 years of age, contributing to a 3–3 away draw against S.C. Freamunde.

Félix competed in Hungary, Brazil and Japan in the following years, playing top flight football with Ferencvárosi TC. In 2014, he switched to the China League One with Beijing Baxy FC, joining fellow league team Xinjiang Tianshan Leopard F.C. the following year.

In April 2018 after a 3-year absence from the professional game, Félix earned himself an opportunity to sign for Japanese side Giravanz Kitakyushu in the J3 League.
