= Elvin Beqiri =

Albanian footballer

Personal information
- Full name: Elvin Beqiri
- Date of birth: 27 September 1980 (age 46)
- Place of birth: Shkodër, Albania
- Height: 1.80 m (5 ft 11 in)
- Position: Centre-back

Team information
- Current team: Albania U17 (manager)

Youth career
- 1995–1999: Vllaznia Shkodër

Senior career*
Years	Team	Apps	(Gls)
1999–2003	Vllaznia	83	(6)
2003–2005	Metalurh Donetsk	49	(0)
2005	Alania Vladikavkaz	7	(0)
2005–2006	Maccabi Tel Aviv	14	(0)
2006–2008	Metalurh Donetsk	11	(0)
2008–2009	Arsenal Kyiv	0	(0)
2009–2010	Vllaznia	48	(5)
2010–2012	Khazar Lankaran	60	(4)
2012–2015	Vllaznia	74	(2)

International career
2002–2009	Albania	47	(0)

Managerial career
- 2019–: Albania U17
- 2023: Cherry Beach Soccer Club
- * Club domestic league appearances and goals

Elvin Beqiri (born 27 September 1980) is a former Albanian footballer, who spent the mayority of his career playing Vllaznia Shkodër. Beqiri was also an international footballer, having 47 caps for the Albania national team. His former teams included Metalurh Donetsk, Alania Vladikavkaz, Maccabi Tel Aviv and Khazar Lankaran.

== Club career ==
Beqiri returned to his first club Vllaznia Shkodër on 12 July 2012 by penning a two-year contract. During his presentation, Beqiri stated that he will end his professional career at Vllaznia. He decided to retire from football after the end of 2014–15 season, ending his sixteen-year career.

== International career ==
He made his debut for Albania in a January 2002 friendly match against Macedonia in Bahrain and earned a total of 47 caps, scoring no goals. His final international was an October 2009 FIFA World Cup qualification match against Sweden in Solna.

== Career statistics ==
=== Club ===
As of 17 December 2013

Club performance			League		Cup		Continental		Total	
Season	Club	League	Apps	Goals	Apps	Goals	Apps	Goals	Apps	Goals
1999–2000	Vllaznia Shkodër	Albanian Superliga	11	0			0	0	11	0
2000–01	Vllaznia Shkodër	Albanian Superliga	21	3					21	3
2001–02	Vllaznia Shkodër	Albanian Superliga	26	3			4	0	30	3
2002–03	Vllaznia Shkodër	Albanian Superliga	25	0			-		25	0
2003–04	Metalurh Donetsk	Ukrainian Premier League	23	0			2	0	25	0
2004–05	Metalurh Donetsk	Ukrainian Premier League	23	0			3	0	26	0
2005–06	Metalurh Donetsk	Ukrainian Premier League	4	0			0	0	4	0
2005	Alania Vladikavkaz	RFPL	6	0			-		6	0
2005–06	Maccabi Tel Aviv	Israeli Premier League	12	0			-		12	0
2006–07	Metalurh Donetsk	Ukrainian Premier League	8	0			-		8	0
2007–08	Arsenal Kyiv	Ukrainian Premier League	0	0			-		0	0
2007–08	Vllaznia Shkodër	Albanian Superliga	6	0			-		6	0
2008–09	Vllaznia Shkodër	Albanian Superliga	26	3			4	0	30	3
2009–10	Vllaznia Shkodër	Albanian Superliga	16	2			4	0	20	2
2009–10	Khazar Lankaran	Azerbaijan Premier League	14	0	4	1	-		18	1
2010–11	Khazar Lankaran	Azerbaijan Premier League	24	4	1	0	2	0	27	4
2011–12	Khazar Lankaran	Azerbaijan Premier League	22	0	1	0	1	0	24	0
2012–13	Vllaznia Shkodër	Albanian Superliga	22	0	3	0	-		25	0
2013–14	Vllaznia Shkodër	Albanian Superliga	11	0	0	0	-		11	0
Total	Albania		164	11	3	0	12	0	176	11
Total	Ukraine		58	0			5	0	63	0
Total	Russia		6	0			0	0	6	0
Total	Israel		12	0			0	0	12	0
Total	Azerbaijan		60	4	6	1	3	0	69	5
Career total			300	15	9	1	20	0	335	16

=== International ===
Albania national team
Year	Apps	Goals
2002	4	0
2003	10	0
2004	6	0
2005	8	0
2006	4	0
2007	3	0
2008	5	0
2009	7	0
Total	47	0
