= Aleksandar Šolić =

Croatian footballer

Personal information
- Date of birth: 29 January 1983 (age 43)
- Place of birth: Rijeka, SFR Yugoslavia
- Height: 1.81 m (5 ft 11 in)
- Position: Midfielder

Youth career
- –2002: Rijeka

Senior career*
Years	Team	Apps	(Gls)
2002–2005	Pomorac	59	(7)
2005	Karlovac	16	(1)
2006	Zadar	10	(6)
2006	Hrvatski Dragovoljac	13	(1)
2007–2009	Osijek	56	(4)
2009–2014	FC Baku	139	(24)
2015–2016	Al-Najma		
2016–2019	Opatija	50	(12)
- * Club domestic league appearances and goals as of 18 March 2018

Aleksandar Šolić (born 29 January 1983 in Rijeka) is a Croatian retired football player who last played for NK Opatija.

== Career ==
=== International ===
He received a call-up from Bosnia and Herzegovina in May 2007, but did not make his debut. In the 2009–2010 season he was named the best player in Azerbaijan.

== Career statistics ==
As of 28 May 2014

Club performance			League		Cup		Continental		Total	
Season	Club	League	Apps	Goals	Apps	Goals	Apps	Goals	Apps	Goals
2002–03	NK Pomorac	Prva HNL	1	0			-		1	0
2003–04	NK Pomorac	Druga HNL	30	4			-		30	4
2004–05	NK Pomorac	Druga HNL	28	3			-		28	3
2005–06	NK Karlovac	Druga HNL	16	1			-		16	1
2005–06	Zadar	Druga HNL	10	6			-		10	6
2006–07	Hrvatski Dragovoljac	Druga HNL	13	1			-		13	1
2006–07	NK Osijek	Prva HNL	11	2			-		11	2
2007–08	NK Osijek	Prva HNL	31	2			-		31	2
2008–09	NK Osijek	Prva HNL	14	0			-		14	0
2009–10	FC Baku	Azerbaijan Premier League	29	7	5	3	6	1	40	11
2010–11	FC Baku	Azerbaijan Premier League	27	1	2	0	2	1	31	2
2011–12	FC Baku	Azerbaijan Premier League	24	7	5	1	-		29	8
2012–13	FC Baku	Azerbaijan Premier League	29	3	5	1	2	0	36	4
2013–14	FC Baku	Azerbaijan Premier League	30	6	3	1	-		33	7
Total	Croatia		154	19			-		154	19
Total	Azerbaijan		139	24	20	6	10	2	166	32
Career total			293	43	20	6	10	2	322	51

== Honours ==
FK Baku

- Azerbaijan Cup (2): 2009–10, 2011–12
