= FK Standard Sumgayit =

Standard Sumgayit
- Full name: Standard Futbol Klubu
- Nickname: Red Bankers
- Founded: 2006
- Dissolved: 2010
- Ground: Mehdi Huseynzade Stadium, Sumgayit, Azerbaijan
- Capacity: 8,000
- League: Azerbaijan Premier League
- 2009–2010: 11th
Home colours	Away colours

FK Standard Sumgayit (Azerbaijani: Standard Futbol Klubu) was an Azerbaijani football club. They played in the AFFA Supreme League, the top division in Azerbaijani football. Founded in Baku, the club moved to Sumgayit on 12 June 2009, which changed also club's name to Standard Sumgayit.

In 2010, the club's owners announced that the club will be dissolved, and they will not be participating in Azerbaijan First Division.

== Stadium ==
Standard played their home games at the 15,350 capacity Mehdi Huseynzade Stadium in Sumqayit.

== League and domestic cup history ==
Season	League									Azerbaijan Cup	Top goalscorer		Manager
Season	Div.	Pos.	Pl.	W	D	L	GS	GA	P	Azerbaijan Cup	Name	League	Manager
2007–08	1st	9	26	8	8	10	36	26	32	Quarter-Finals	(Brazil) Léo Rocha	8	(Azerbaijan) Yunis Huseynov
2008–09	1st	7	26	12	3	11	30	31	39	1/8 Finals	(Uruguay) Angel Gutierrez	10	? (Azerbaijan) Badri Kvaratskhelia (Azerbaijan) Rafik Mirzoyev
2009–10	1st	11	22	2	5	15	16	34	11	Quarter-Finals	(Azerbaijan) Farid Guliyev	16	(Lithuania) Valdas Ivanauskas (Azerbaijan) Boyukagha Hajiyev

== Individual records ==
=== Appearances ===
#	Player	Years	Appearances	Goals
1	(Azerbaijan) Ruslan Amirjanov	2007–09	42	0
2	(Uruguay) Richard Requelme Chiappa	2009–10	40	4
3	(Azerbaijan) Farid Guliyev	2009–10	38	19
4	(Uruguay) Angel Gutierrez	2008–09	37	15
4	(Moldova) Dan Pîslă	2008–09	37	7
6	(Lithuania) Edvinas Lukoševičius	2008	35	1
7	(Georgia (country)) David Çiçveyşvili	2009	34	0
8	(Azerbaijan) Kamal Guliyev	2007–08, 2009–10	32	0
8	(Azerbaijan) Rəcəb Fərəczadə	2007–2009	32	0
10	(Uruguay) Daniel Martínez	2007–08	29	6

=== Goals ===
#	Player	Years	Appearances	Goals
1	(Azerbaijan) Farid Guliyev	2009–10	38	19
2	(Uruguay) Angel Gutierrez	2008–09	37	15
3	(Brazil) Léo Rocha	2007–08	19	8
4	(Moldova) Dan Pîslă	2008–09	37	7
5	(Uruguay) Daniel Martínez	2007–08	29	6
6	(Moldova) Anatolie Doroș	2008	11	4
6	(Uruguay) Richard Requelme Chiappa	2009–10	40	4
6	(Azerbaijan) Zeynal Zeynalov	2009–10	21	4
9	(Brazil) Rodrigo Silva	2009	15	3
9	(Brazil) Velton Carlos Silva	2009	11	3
9	(Portugal) Hugo Machado	2009–10	25	3
9	(Azerbaijan) Samir Zargarov	2009–10	23	3
9	(Russia) Vitali Balamestny	2010	9	3

== Managers ==
Name	Managerial Tenure	P	W	D	L	Win %
(Lithuania) Valdas Ivanauskas	16 July – 23 October 2009	7	0	2	5	0
(Azerbaijan) Boyukagha Hajiyev	23 October 2009 – 25 August 2010	29	8	5	14	27.59
