= List of foreign Azerbaijan Premier League players =

This is a list of foreign players in the Azerbaijan Premier League, which commenced play in 1992. The following players must meet both of the following two criteria:

1. Have played at least one Premier League game. Players who were signed by Premier League clubs, but only played in lower league, cup and/or European games, or did not play in any competitive games at all, are not included.
2. Are considered foreign, i.e., outside Azerbaijan, determined by the following:

A player is considered foreign if he is not eligible to play for the national team of Azerbaijan.

More specifically,

- If a player has been capped on international level, the national team is used; if he has been capped by more than one country, the highest level (or the most recent) team is used.
- If a player has not been capped on international level, his country of birth is used, except those who were born abroad from Azerbaijan.

In bold: Current foreign Azerbaijan Premier League players and their present team.

As of match played 20 September 2026

== Naturalized players (Note: Players that have been born abroad, moved to Azerbaijan later than the age of twelve, acquired Azerbaijan citizenship and waived the opportunity to play for the national teams of their native countries in order to be eligible to play for Azerbaijan) ==
- (Brazil) Richard Almeida – Qarabağ (2012–2018, 2019, 2021–2025), Zira (2020–2021)
- (Brazil) Andrezinho – Baku (2004–08), Karvan (2009)
- (Brazil) Fábio – Mil-Muğan (2005–06), Olimpik Baku (2006–08), Baku (2008–12)
- (Brazil) Leandro Gomes – Baku (2004–08), Olimpik Baku (2008–09), Karvan (2009)
- (Brazil) Marcos – Karvan (2005–10), Neftçi (2007)
- (Brazil) Ernani Pereira – Karvan (2005–10)
- (Croatia) Filip Ozobić – Gabala (2016–2018), Qarabağ (2018–2023), Neftçi (2023–2025), Turan Tovuz (2025-2026)
- (Georgia (country)) Badri Kvaratskhelia – Kapaz (1997–98), Shamkir (1998–2005)
- (Germany) Pardis Fardjad-Azad – Sumgayit (2012–16), Keşla (2016–2018), Zira (2018–19)
- (Germany) Cihan Özkara – Simurq (2015)
- (Iran) Ali Ghorbani – Sumgayit (2020–2022)
- (Iran) Hojjat Haghverdi – Sumgayit (2021-2022), Neftçi (2023-2025)
- (Israel) Ali Babayev – Sumgayit (2018–2019)
- (Nigeria) Nduka Usim – AZAL (2004–13), Simurq (2014)
- (Russia) Azer Aliyev – Neftçi (2022–2025)
- (Russia) **Aleksey Isayev** – Sumgayit (2018–2020), **Sabah** (2020–2024, 2026–), Qarabağ (2024–2025)
- (Russia) Mehdi Jannatov – Sumgayit (2017–2021, 2023–), Zira (2021–2023)
- (Russia) **Abdulakh Khaybulayev** – **Sabah** (2021–)
- (Russia) Sergei Sokolov – Kapaz (2005), Qarabağ (2006), Simurq (2008–10), Gabala (2010–12)
- (Russia) **Aykhan Guseynov** – Turan Tovuz (2022–2026), **Zira** (2026–)
- (Serbia) Branimir Subašić – Neftçi (2005–08), Gabala (2010–11), Khazar Lankaran (2011–13), Qarabağ (2013)
- (Ukraine) Magomed Kurbanov – Sumgayit (2014–17), Neftçi (2015–16), Kapaz (2017)
- (Ukraine) Pavlo Pashayev – Gabala (2015)
- (Ukraine) Vladimir Poşexontsev – Neftçi (1998–2000)
- (Ukraine) Aleksey Stukas – Neftçi (1998–2000)

== UEFA ==
=== Albania ===
- Ervin Bulku – AZAL (2011–2012)
- Eleandro Pema – AZAL (2010–2011)
- Suad Liçi – Baku (2005–2006)
- Isnik Alimi – Gabala (2021–2023)
- Jurgen Goxha – Gabala (2020–2021), Sabail (2021–2022)
- Sabien Lilaj – Gabala (2018–2019)
- Emiljano Vila – Inter Baku (2015)
- Redon Mihana – Kapaz (2024)
- Elvin Beqiri – Khazar Lankaran (2010–2012)
- Bruno Telushi – Neftçi (2020–2021)
- Ansi Agolli – Qarabağ (2010–2011, 2012–2019)
- Admir Teli – Qarabağ (2009–2015)
- Redon Xhixha – Qarabağ (2023–2025)
- Amir Bilali – Sabail (2024–2025)
- Belajdi Pusi – Turan Tovuz (2023–2024), Shamakhi (2024)
- Gerhard Progni – Zira (2016–2017)

=== Belarus ===
- Gennadi Bliznyuk – AZAL (2011)
- Artsyom Vaskow – Olimpik-Shuvalan (2009)
- Mikhail Sivakow – Gabala (2015)
- Andrey Sinenko – İmişli (2025–2026)
- Valyantsin Byalkevich – Inter Baku (2008–09)
- Mihail Makowski – Inter Baku (2004–06)
- Uladzimir Makowski – Inter Baku (2004–06)
- Andrey Milewski – Inter Baku (2004)
- Vitaly Varivonchik – Inter Baku (2004–05)
- Yegor Khvalko – Kapaz (2022–2025)
- Vladislav Vasilyuchek – Kapaz (2022–2023)
- Alyaksandr Martseshkin – Khazar Lankaran (2004–06)
- Igor Kovalevich – Khazar Lankaran (2004)
- Andrey Lobanov – Khazar Lankaran (2004)
- Dmitri Koltoviç – Khazar Lankaran (2004)
- Syarhey Pawlyukovich – Khazar Lankaran (2007)
- **Yegor Bogomolsky** – Neftçi (2022–2025), **Zira** (2025–)
- Dmitri Parkhachev – Olimpik Baku (2007–08), Kapaz (2011–12)
- Vital Lyadzyanyow – MKT Araz (2007)
- Andrey Sherakow – Simurq (2009)
- Viktor Tulyantsev – Qarabağ (2004)
- Boris Karasyov – MKT Araz (2004–05)
- Dmitri Tulintsev – Qarabağ (2003–04)

=== Belgium ===
- Ismail Azzaoui – Araz-Naxçıvan (2023–2024)
- **Desmond Acquah** – **Kapaz** (2026–)
- Emile Mpenza – Neftçi (2010–12)
- Jonathan Benteke – Shamakhi (2024)
- Benjamin Lambot – Simurq (2014–15)
- Taner Taktak - Sumgayit (2012–13)
- Loris Brogno – Zira (2021–2023)

=== Bosnia and Herzegovina ===
- Semir Bukvic – Araz-Naxçıvan (2023–2024)
- Numan Kurdić – Araz-Naxçıvan (2023–2024)
- Mićo Kuzmanović – Araz-Naxçıvan (2023–2025)
- Nedo Turković – AZAL (2014)
- Saša Kajkut – Baku (2010–11)
- Tomislav Stanić – Inter Baku (2006–07), Gänclärbirliyi Sumqayit (2007–08)
- Ermin Zec – Gabala (2015–16)
- Milija Žižić – Gabala (2008–09)
- Predrag Bogosavljević – Göyazan Qazakh (2004–05)
- Njegoš Matić – Göyazan Qazakh (2004–05)
- Eldin Adilović – Mughan (2009–10)
- Adis Ćulov – Mughan (2009)
- Irfan Fejzić – Mughan (2010–11)
- Ekrem Hodžić – Mughan (2009–11), Ravan Baku (2011–13)
- Edis Kurtanović – Mughan (2009–10), Kapaz (2010–11)
- Amer Jugo – Mughan (2010–11)
- Ilija Prodanović – Mughan (2010)
- Irfan Rastoder – Mughan (2011)
- Kenan Pirić – Neftçi (2025–2026)
- Tomislav Višević – Neftçi (2004–05), Olimpik Baku (2005)
- Semjon Milošević – Olimpik Baku (2005)
- Asmir Begović – Qarabağ (2019)
- Nidal Ferhatović – Qarabağ (2007–09)
- Ibrahim Šehić – Qarabağ (2013–2018)
- Sedat Şahin – Qarabağ (2008–09)
- **Martin Zlomislić** – **Qarabağ** (2026–)
- Bojan Marković – Ravan Baku (2014)
- Mario Marina – Sabah (2020–2021)
- **Bojan Letić** – Sabah (2022–2026), **Araz-Naxçıvan** (2026–)
- Adi Mehremić – Sabail (2023–2024)
- Mario Božić – Simurq (2012–13)
- Nenad Kiso – Simurq (2013)
- Dilaver Zrnanović – Simurq (2012–14)
- Almir Aganspahić – Sumgayit (2022)
- Slaviša Radović – Sumgayit (2024)
- Dalibor Dragić – Turan Tovuz (2006)

=== Bulgaria ===
- Tomi Kostadinov – AZAL (2014)
- Martin Petkov – Turan Tovuz (2023-2024)
- Enyo Krastovchev – AZAL (2010–11), Inter Baku (2011–12)
- Stanislav Bachev – Baku (2007–09)
- Radomir Todorov – Khazar Lankaran (2007–10, 2012–13), Baku (2011)
- Aleksandar Tomash – Baku (2008–09)
- Asen Nikolov – Baku (2007–08), Gabala (2008)
- Velichko Velichkov – Gabala (2010–11)
- Daniel Genov – Inter Baku (2010–13), Simurq (2011–12)
- Svilen Simeonov – Inter Baku (2007–09)
- Georgi Vladimirov – Inter Baku (2007–08)
- Zhivko Zhelev – Inter Baku (2010), Simurq (2011)
- Petar Zlatinov – Inter Baku (2008–13)
- Kostadin Dzhambazov – Khazar Lankaran (2007–09)
- Galin Ivanov – Khazar Lankaran (2014)
- Martin Stankov – Khazar Lankaran (2004–07)
- Ivan Tsvetkov – Khazar Lankaran (2008–10)
- Ahmed Ahmedov – Neftçi (2021)
- Marcho Dafchev – Neftçi (2008–09)
- Svetoslav Petrov – Neftçi (2006–09)
- Ivan Karamanov – Qarabağ (2004–05)
- Simeon Slavchev – Qarabağ (2018–2019)
- Emil Martinov – Sabail (2018–2019, 2022–2023)
- Nikolay Valev – Simurq (2009–10), Mughan (2010)
- Martin Kerchev – Turan Tovuz (2011)
- Boris Kondev – Turan Tovuz (2011)
- Kiril Nikolov – Turan Tovuz (2005)

=== Croatia ===
- **Luka Dumančić** – **Araz-Naxçıvan** (2026–)
- Duje Baković – Baku (2012)
- Marko Šarlija – Baku (2008–12)
- Ernad Skulić – Baku (2008–12)
- Aleksandar Šolić – Baku (2009–14)
- Petar Franjić – Gabala (2016–17)
- Vinko Međimorec – Gabala (2020–2021)
- Ivica Žunić – Gabala (2019–2020)
- Matija Špičić – Inter Baku (2013–15)
- Mario Mustapic – Kapaz (2023)
- Robert Alviž – Khazar Lankaran (2012–13)
- Marin Oršulić – Khazar Lankaran (2013)
- Vjekoslav Tomić – Khazar Lankaran (2014–15)
- Ivan Radoš – Kapaz (2012–13)
- Slavko Bralić – Neftçi (2018–2019)
- Ivan Brkić – Neftçi (2022–2024)
- Darko Čordaš – Neftçi (2005–06)
- Dario Melnjak – Neftçi (2016)
- Mateo Mužek – Neftçi (2017–2018)
- Goran Paracki – Neftçi (2018–2019)
- Krševan Santini – Neftçi (2016)
- Domagoj Kosić – Olimpik Baku (2005)
- Boško Peraica – Olimpik Baku (2005)
- Miro Varvodić – Qarabağ (2012–2013)
- Fabijan Buntić – Qarabağ (2024–2026)
- **Ivan Lepinjica** – **Sabah** (2024–)
- Špiro Peričić – Sabah (2021–2022)
- Adnan Hodžić – Simurq (2010–11)
- Stjepan Poljak – Simurq (2012–15), Inter Baku (2015)
- Tomislav Bušić – Simurq (2012–13)
- Zdravko Popović – Simurq (2012–13)
- Ivan Grabovac – Turan Tovuz (2012)
- Anton Rukavina – Turan Tovuz (2012–13)
- Ante Zurak – Turan Tovuz (2012)

=== Cyprus ===
- Giorgos Pelagias – Baku – (2013–2015)

=== Czech Republic ===
- Bronislav Červenka – Inter Baku (2007–2012)
- Lubomír Kubica – Inter Baku (2009–2010)
- Pavel Dreksa – Neftçi (2017)
- Zdeněk Folprecht – Neftçi (2017)
- Ivo Táborský – Inter Baku (2014)
- Tomas Ineman – Khazar Lankaran (2009–2011)
- Lukáš Třešňák – Simurq (2014)

=== England ===
- Terry Cooke – Gabala (2010–2011)
- Josh Ginnelly – Turan Tovuz (2026)

=== Estonia ===
- Sergei Zenjov – Gabala (2015–2017)
- Tihhon Šišov – Khazar Lankaran (2010–2011)
- Dmitri Kruglov – Neftçi (2008, 2008–2010), Inter Baku (2010–2011), Ravan Baku (2014)
- Taavi Rähn – Neftçi (2009–2010)
- Andrei Stepanov – Neftçi (2009–2010)
- Vladimir Voskoboinikov – Neftçi (2010)
- Artur Kotenko – Ravan Baku (2011)
- Erik Sorga – Sumgayit (2023–2024)

=== France ===
- **Charles Boli** – **Araz-Naxçıvan** (2025–)
- Axel Ngando – Araz-Naxçıvan (2023–2024)
- Ender Günlü – Olimpik-Shuvalan (2009–2010), Turan Tovuz (2012–2013)
- Franck Madou – AZAL (2017)
- Stéphane Borbiconi – Baku (2010–2011)
- Bilel Aouacheria – Gabala (2023–2024)
- Bagaliy Dabo – Gabala (2016–2018), Neftçi (2018–2020)
- Abdelrafik Gérard – Gabala (2020)
- Steeven Joseph-Monrose – Gabala (2017–2019), Neftçi (2019–2021)
- Yannick Kamanan – Gabala (2012–2014)
- Ibrahim Sangaré – Gabala (2025–2026)
- Sambou Sissoko – Gabala (2026)
- Yohan Bocognano – Inter Baku (2014–2015)
- L'Imam Seydi – Inter Baku (2015)
- Salif Cissé – Kapaz (2023)
- Romain Basque – Neftçi (2021)
- Imad Faraj – Neftçi (2025–2026)
- Adama Diakhaby – Qarabağ (2023–2024)
- **Jaly Mouaddib** – **Qarabağ** (2026–)
- Abdellah Zoubir – Qarabağ (2018–2026)
- **Zinédine Ould Khaled** – **Sabah** (2025–)
- **Younes Lachaab** – **Sabah** (2026–)
- Aaron Malouda – Sabah (2025–2026)
- Sylvain Deslandes – Sabail (2023–2024)
- **Oumar Diaw** – **Shafa Baku** (2026–)
- Brahim Konaté – Shamakhi (2024–2025), Zira (2025–2026)
- Rayan Senhadji – Sumgayit (2025–2026)
- **Steeve Beusnard** – **Turan Tovuz** (2026-)
- Dylan Duventru – Zira (2018–2019)
- Iron Gomis – Zira (2024–2026)
- Hamidou Keyta – Zira (2022–2023), Qarabağ (2023–2024), Araz-Naxçıvan (2025–2026)
- Ben Sangaré – Zira (2017)
- Chafik Tigroudja – Zira (2019–2020)

=== Georgia ===
- İrakli Gelaşvili – Adliyya Baku
- David Janalidze – Turan Tovuz (2012–13), Araz-Naxçıvan (2014), AZAL (2016–17)
- Ramaz Dzhabnidze – AZAL (2009–10)
- Roman Goginashvili – AZAL (2009–10)
- Aleksandre Guruli – AZAL (2015–16)
- Lasha Kasradze – AZAL (2014–15), Inter Baku (2015–16)
- Nugzar Kvirtia – AZAL (2009–12, 2015–17), Turan Tovuz (2012–13)
- Giorgi Demetradze – Baku (2008–09)
- Merab Dzodzuashvili – Baku (2005)
- Aleksandre Gogoberishvili – Baku (2005–08), Qarabağ (2008), AZAL (2009), Turan Tovuz (2011–12)
- Giorgi Megreladze – Baku (2006–07)
- George Popkhadze – Baku (2012–13)
- Alexander Rekhviashvili – Baku (2005)
- Amiran Mujiri – Baku (2007–10), Standard Sumgayit (2010)
- Şota Cişkariani – Bakili Baku
- David Kokaşvili – Bakili Baku
- Tornike Aptsiauri – Gabala (2007–09)
- Goga Beraia – Gabala, Kəpəz
- Dmitri Ditmarxusişvili – Gabala (2006–07)
- Giorgi Gabidauri – Gabala (2007–08)
- Revaz Getsadze – Olimpik Baku (2008–09), Gabala (2009–10)
- Dmitri Kapanadze – Gabala (2006–07)
- Merab Gigauri – Gabala (2019–2021), Shamakhi (2021–2022)
- Gorgi Krasovski – Gabala (2006–07)
- Zurab Mamaladze – Gabala (2007–08)
- Irakli Vashakidze – Gabala (2007–08)
- **Davit Volkovi** – Gabala (2019), **Zira** (2020–2022, 2024–), Sabah (2022–2024)
- Laşa Coqiaşvili – Göyazan Qazax
- Zaza Medoyev – Turan Tovuz (2005–06), Göyazan Qazax
- Roman Çitadze – Turan Tovuz, Göyazan Qazax
- Ilia Kandelaki – Inter Baku (2010–13)
- Aleksandre Amisulashvili – Inter Baku (2014–15)
- Aleksandre Iashvili – Inter Baku (2013–14)
- Zurab Khizanishvili – Inter Baku (2015–17)
- Nika Kvekveskiri – Inter Baku (2015–16), Gabala (2016–17)
- Lasha Salukvadze – Inter Baku (2013–16)
- Giorgi Lomaia – Inter Baku (2009–16)
- Kakhaber Mzhavanadze – Inter Baku (2009–11)
- Giorgi Navalovski – Inter Baku (2010), Neftçi (2017)
- David Odikadze – Inter Baku (2009–11)
- Revaz Tevdoradze – Inter Baku
- Kaxaber Cebisaşvili – Khazar Universiteti Baku, Bakili Baku, Karat Baki
- Armaz Çeladze – Karat Baki
- Dmitri Arsoşvili – Karat Baki
- Laşa Ambidze – Karat Baki
- Roman Akhalkatsi – Karvan (2005–08), Olimpik Baku (2008–09), Simurq (2009–10)
- Lekso Intskirveli – Karvan
- Mixail Mesxi – Karvan
- Gocha Trapaidze – Karvan (2004–08)
- **Mate Abuladze** – **Kapaz** (2026–)
- Otar Aptsiauri – Kapaz (2025)
- Rati Ardazishvili – Kapaz (2025)
- Irakli Beraia – Kapaz, Turan Tovuz
- Zura Dzamsashvili – Kapaz, Turan Tovuz
- Levan Mdivnishvili – Kapaz
- Mamuka Xundadze – Kapaz
- Nodari Papidze – Kapaz
- **Giorgi Papunashvili** – Kapaz (2023–2024), **Zira** (2024–)
- Roin Kerdzevadze – Kapaz
- Giorgi Kantaria – Kapaz (2022–2023), Shamakhi (2024)
- Mate Kvirkvia – Kapaz (2022–2024)
- Georgi Danibeqaşvili – Kapaz, Polis Akademy Baku, MOIK Baku
- Giorgi Sepiashvili – Kapaz, Inter Baku
- Valeri Abramidze – Neftçi (2005–06, 2009–10), Khazar Lankaran (2006–07), Inter Baku (2010–13)
- Davit Imedashvili – Khazar Lankaran (2005–06, 2010)
- Timuri Çlaidze – Khazar Universiteti Baku
- David Ciqoşvili – Khazar Universiteti Baku
- Georgi Şukakidze – Khazar Universiteti Baku
- David Menteşaşvili – Khazar Universiteti Baku
- Georgi Tsagareishvili – Khazar Universiteti Baku
- Arçil Soxadze – Khazar Universiteti Baku
- Qoderdi Qoqoladze – Khazar Universiteti Baku, Gänclärbirliyi Sumqayit
- Deviko Khinchagov – Masallı (2007–08)
- Vaja Lomaşvili – Masallı
- Boris Qonçarov – Masallı
- Amiran Gventsadze – MOIK Baku
- Givi Çxetiani – Mughan, Bakili Baku
- George Gulordava – Mughan, Ravan Baku
- Davit Svanidze – Mughan
- Georgi Adamia – Neftçi (2004–08), Baku (2008–10), Qarabağ (2010–12), Inter Baku (2012–13)
- Vato Arveladze – Neftçi (2022–2023)
- Vladimir Burduli – Neftçi (2010)
- Otar Korgalidze – Neftçi (1995)
- Giorgi Chelidze – Neftçi (2008–09)
- Shota Chomakhidze – Neftçi (2003), Qarabağ (2004)
- Solomon Kvirkvelia – Neftçi (2022–2023)
- Mikheil Khutsishvili – Kəpəz (2004–05), Olimpik Baku (2008)
- Jaba Dvali – Qarabağ (2014)
- Nikoloz Gelashvili – Qarabağ (2013–14)
- Luka Gugeshashvili – Qarabağ (2022, 2022–2024)
- Mikheil Ergemlidze – Sabah (2021–2022), Kapaz (2022)
- David Qureşidze – Sahdag Qusar
- Kakhaber Kvetenadze – Sahdag Qusar (2004–05)
- Shalva Mumladze – Sahdag Qusar (2005)
- Arçil Lobjanidze – Sahdag Qusar
- Tornike Navruzaşvili – Sahdag Qusar
- Luka Imnadze – Sabail (2021)
- **Tornike Akhvlediani** – **Shamakhi** (2026–)
- Malxas Çinçarauli – Shamkir
- Demuri Kukuvava – Shamkir
- Geli Qabisoniya – Shamkir
- Gela Bartiya – Shamk
- Davit Bolkvadze – Simurq (2008–10)
- Kakhaber Chkhetiani – Simurq (2008–10)
- Grigol Dolidze – Simurq (2008–09)
- Teimuraz Gongadze – Simurq (2009–10)
- Mikheil Makhviladze – Simurq (2008–09)
- Mixail Alavidze – Standard Baku
- David Çiçveyşvili – Standard Baku
- Bachana Tskhadadze – Standard Baku (2008–09), Inter Baku (2010–15), Simurq (2010)
- Vladimir Uqrexelidze – Standard Baku
- Davit Chichveishvili – Standard Sumgayit (2008–10)
- Sergi Orbeladze – Standard Sumgayit (2009–10)
- Giorgi Seturidze – Standard Sumgayit (2009–10), Kəpəz (2010–11)
- Levan Silagadze – Standard Sumgayit (2008–10)
- Giorgi Kharaishvili – Sumgayit (2024-2025)
- Nika Apakidze – Sabail (2018)
- Tamaz Tsetskhladze – Sabail (2017–2019)
- Giorgi Beriashvili – Turan Tovuz (2011–12)
- Timur Dmitriaşvili – Turan Tovuz
- Georgi Chedia – Turan Tovuz
- Giorgi Kilasonia – Turan Tovuz (2000–01), Neftçi (2001–02)
- Levan Chkhetiani – Turan Tovuz (2012–13)
- Marat Dzakhmishev – Turan Tovuz (2010)
- Oleg Gvelesiani – Turan Tovuz (2009), Standard Sumgayit (2011)
- Zurab Khurtsidze – Turan Tovuz (2011)
- Nizami Sadıqov – Turan Tovuz
- Jaba Tsiklauri – Turan Tovuz
- Zaza Latsabidze – Turan Tovuz (2005–06)
- Giorgi Modebadze – Turan Tovuz
- Gogi Pipia – Turan Tovuz (2012)
- Shalva Pirtskhalava – Turan Tovuz (2010)
- Imeda Ashortia – Turan Tovuz (2022–2023)
- Piruz Marakvelidze – Turan Tovuz (2022–2024)
- Tengiz Sichinava – Turan Tovuz (2005), MKT Araz (2006)
- Giorgi Gorozia – Zira (2017)

=== Germany ===
- Ba-Muaka Simakala – Araz-Naxçıvan (2025–2026)
- Robert Bauer – Neftçi (2024–2025)
- **Bassala Sambou** – **Neftçi** (2025–)
- **Reda Khadra** – **Qarabağ** (2026–)
- Omar El-Zein – Standard Sumgayit (2009–2010)
- Murat Doymus – Sumgayit (2012–2013)
- Kiyan Soltanpour – Sumgayit (2014–2015)
- Göksu Hasancik – Turan Tovuz (2011–2012)

=== Greece ===
- Charis Komesidis – Bakili Baku (2008)
- Aleksios Mikhailidis – Bakili Baku (2008)
- Vangelis Mantzios – Baku (2012–2013)
- Giorgos Georgiadis – Keşla (2018)
- Dimitris Sialmas – Khazar Lankaran (2012–2013)
- Vangelis Platellas – Neftçi (2019–2020)
- Dimitrios Chantakias – Zira (2020–2024)
- Anastasios Papazoglou – Zira (2019–2020)

=== Hungary ===
- **Alen Skribek** – **Neftçi** (2026–)
- Márk Tamás – Neftçi (2023–2024)
- **Bence Várkonyi** – **Qarabağ** (2026–)

=== Iceland ===
- Hannes Þór Halldórsson – Qarabağ (2018–2019)

=== Israel ===
- Bar Cohen – Araz-Naxçıvan (2025–2026)
- Gilad Abramov – Gabala (2023–2024)
- Fares Abu Akel – Gabala (2022–2024)
- Osama Khalaila – Gabala (2022–2024)
- Nir Bardea – Sabail (2023–2024)
- Yadin Lugasi – Sabail (2023–2024)
- Gitay Sofir – Sabail (2023–2025)
- **David Dego** – **Shamakhi** (2026–)
- Idan Weitzman – Simurq (2013–2015)
- Amir Agayev – Sumgayit (2019–2020)
- **Roi Kahat** – **Sumgayit** (2023-)

=== Italy ===
- Gianluca Sansone – Neftçi (2019)

=== Kazakhstan ===
- Anatoli Stukalov – Turan Tovuz (2012–2013)
- **Stas Pokatilov** – **Sabah** (2025–)
- Rifat Nurmugamet – Sumgayit (2022)
- Karam Sultanov – Sumgayit (2020–2021)

=== Kosovo ===
- Mensur Limani – AZAL (2010–12)
- **David Domgjoni** – **Kapaz** (2026–)

=== Latvia ===
- Oskars Kļava – AZAL (2012–2015)
- Nikolajs Kozačuks – AZAL (2009)
- Ritus Krjauklis – AZAL (2011)
- Deniss Ivanovs – Baku (2011–2013)
- Andrejs Štolcers – Baku (2005–2006)
- Māris Verpakovskis – Baku (2011–2013)
- Pāvels Doroševs – Gabala (2009–2012), Neftçi (2013–2015)
- Ģirts Karlsons – Inter Baku (2009–2012)
- Vladimirs Koļesņičenko – Inter Baku (2009)
- Andrejs Rubins – Inter Baku(2008–2010), Qarabağ(2010–2011), Simurq (2011–2012)
- Kristaps Grebis – Kapaz (2011), Simurq (2011–2012)
- Deniss Romanovs – Khazar Lankaran (2010–2011)
- **Cebrail Makreckis** – **Qarabağ** (2026–)
- Igors Tarasovs – Simurq (2012)
- Genādijs Soloņicins – Simurq (2009–2010)
- Jurijs Ksenzovs – Turan Tovuz (2010)
- Mareks Zuntners – Turan Tovuz (2009)

=== Lithuania ===
- Mindaugas Daunoravičius – AZAL (2011–2012)
- Gvidas Juška – AZAL (2010–2011)
- Marius Kazlauskas – AZAL (2010), Turan Tovuz (2012–2013)
- Andrius Velička – AZAL (2012–2013)
- Deividas Česnauskis – Baku (2012–2014)
- Robertas Poškus – Inter Baku (2009–2011), Simurq (2011–2012)
- Tadas Labukas – Inter Baku (2008–2009)
- Tomas Ražanauskas – Inter Baku (2006–2007)
- Andrius Gedgaudas – Inter Baku (2006–2008)
- Valdas Trakys – Inter Baku (2006–2007)
- Edvinas Girdvainis – Keşla (2018–2019)
- Darius Žutautas – Khazar Lankaran (2006–2007)
- Tadas Simaitis – Kapaz (2015–2017)
- Paulius Grybauskas – Neftçi (2009–2011)
- Marijanas Choruzijus – Olimpik Baku (2008–2009)
- Egidijus Juška – Qarabağ (2006)
- Mindaugas Kalonas – Ravan Baku (2013), Baku (2013–2014), Simurq (2014)
- Domantas Šimkus – Sabail (2020–2022)
- Edgaras Žarskis – Sabail (2017)
- Vidas Alunderis – Simurq (2011–2012)
- Paulius Paknys – Simurq (2010), Inter Baku (2010–2011)
- Edvinas Lukoševičius – Standard (2008–2009), Karvan (2009–2010)

=== Luxembourg ===
- Alessio Curci – Neftçi (2025–2026)
- Vincent Thill – Sabah (2023–2025)

=== Malta ===
- Trent Buhagiar – Kapaz (2025)

=== Montenegro ===
- Miodrag Zec – Baku (2004–2005)
- Stefan Vukčević – Gabala (2020–2022)
- Mijuško Bojović – Keşla (2019–2021)
- Aleksandar Nedović – Inter Baku (2005)
- Boban Bajković – Neftçi (2016–2017)
- Edvin Kuč – Neftçi (2024–2026)
- Jovan Drobnjak – Olympic Baku (2006–2008)
- **Marko Janković** – **Qarabağ** (2022–)
- Marko Vešović – Qarabağ (2021–2025)
- Nikola Vujadinović – Sabah (2020–2021)
- Vasilije Radenović – Shamakhi (2024–2025)
- Miloš Milović – Sumgayit (2024-2025)
- Nikola Vujnović – Sumgayit (2024-2025)
- Aleksandar Dubljević – Turan Tovuz (2011–2012)
- Igor Ivanović – Zira (2015–2016)
- Miloš Bakrač – Zira (2019–2020)
- Bojan Zogović – Zira (2019–2020)

=== Moldova ===
- Cristian Avram – Araz-Naxçıvan (2023–2026)
- Gheorghe Boghiu – AZAL
- Stanislav Namașco – AZAL (2014–2016), Shamakhi (2019–2022)
- Anatolie Doroş – MKT Araz Imisli, Standard, AZAL, Simurq
- Serghei Laşcencov – AZAL
- Artur Pătraş – AZAL
- Vadim Boret– Baku
- Alexei Savinov – Baku
- Veaceslav Sofroni – Baku
- Victor Comleonoc – Gabala
- Anatolie Ostap – Gabala
- Vladimir Ţaranu – Gabala
- Oleg Şişchin – Inter Baku
- Ion Testemiţanu – Inter Baku
- Gennadi Ange – Karat Baki
- **Victor Stînă** – **Kapaz** (2026–)
- Ion Arabadji- Kəpəz
- Denis Calincov – Khazar Lankaran
- Victor Barîșev – MKT Araz
- Aurel Revenko – MKT Araz
- Anatoli Stavila – MKT Araz
- Vadim Cricimar – Mughan
- Iqor Soltaniçi – Mughan
- Petru Racu – Neftçi (2019)
- Nicolae Orlovschi – Ravan Baku
- Eugeniu Cociuc – Sabail (2018, 2018–2019), Sabah (2020), Keşla (2021)
- Alexandru Golban – Simurq
- Alexandru Chirilov – Standard Sumgayit
- Andrei Chirşul – Standard Sumgayit
- Eduard Grosu – Standard Sumgayit
- Daniel Pisla – Standard Sumgayit, Turan Tovuz
- Victor Gonta – Turan Tovuz
- **Denis Marandici** – **Turan Tovuz** (2023–)
- Yevgeni Karabulya – Turan Tovuz
- Valeriu Onila – Turan Tovuz
- Oleg Khromtsov – Turan Tovuz
- Alexandru Dedov – Zira (2018–2019)
- Gheorghe Anton – Zira (2020)

=== Netherlands ===
- Adnan Barakat – Baku (2010–2011)
- Dave Bulthuis – Gabala (2017)
- Lorenzo Ebecilio – Gabala (2013–2014)
- Collins John – Gabala (2011)
- Steve Olfers – Gabala (2010–2012)
- Ruben Schaken – Inter Baku (2015)
- Shaquill Sno – Karvan (2025–2026)
- Melvin Platje – Neftçi (2013–2014)
- Leroy George – Qarabağ (2013–2015)
- Rydell Poepon – Qarabağ (2015–2016)
- Soulyman Allouch – Sabail (2024–2025)
- Anass Najah – Sabail (2023–2024)
- **Christopher Mamengi** – **Shafa Baku** (2026–)
- **Dylan Mertens** – **Shafa Baku** (2026–)
- Mo Hamdaoui – Zira (2021–2023)

=== North Macedonia ===
- Robert Petrov – AZAL (2010–2012)
- Cvetan Churlinov – Baku (2008)
- Georgi Hristov – Baku (2008)
- Edin Nuredinoski – Baku (2012–2014)
- Dragan Načevski – Baku (2009)
- Filip Despotovski – Inter Baku (2010–2011)
- Ilčo Naumoski – Inter Baku (2013)
- Bujamin Asani – Kapaz (2012–2013)
- Nikola Gligorov – Khazar Lankaran (2013–2014)
- Dejan Blaževski – Khazar Lankaran (2014)
- Zoran Baldovaliev – MKT Araz (2005–2006)
- Zoran Sterjovski – MKT Araz
- Sashko Pandev – Mughan (2010–2011)
- Slavčo Georgievski – Neftçi (2010–2012), Inter Baku (2012–2015)
- Igor Mitreski – Neftçi (2010–2014)
- Vanče Šikov – Neftçi (2016)
- Bilal Velija – Olimpik Baku (2008)
- Ilami Halimi – Olimpik Baku (2008)
- Vladimir Dimitrovski – Qarabağ (2015)
- Muarem Muarem – Qarabağ (2012–2015, 2016–2017)
- Zakarija Ramazani – Qarabağ
- Artim Šakiri – Qarabağ (2008–2009)
- Nderim Nexhipi – Qarabağ (2011–2012)
- Florijan Kadriu – Sabail (2020–2021)
- Milovan Petrovikj – Sabail (2021)
- Tome Kitanovski – Sabail (2018–2019)
- Todor Todoroski – Sumgayit (2022-2023)
- Kristijan Velinovski – Sumgayit (2023–2025)
- Gjorgi Stoilov – Zira (2021)
- Yani Urdinov – Zira (2018)

=== Norway ===
- Tarik Elyounoussi – Qarabağ (2017)

=== Poland ===
- Tomasz Stolpa – Gabala (2009–2010)
- Kacper Rosa – Kapaz (2025–2026)
- Tomasz Bobel – Neftçi (2009)
- **Mateusz Kochalski** – **Qarabağ** (2024–)
- Jakub Rzeźniczak – Qarabağ (2017–2019)
- Łukasz Sapela – Ravan Baku (2012–2014)
- **Tymoteusz Puchacz** – **Sabah** (2025–)
- Adam Banaś – Simurq (2014–2015)
- Marcin Burkhardt – Simurq (2012–2013)
- Paweł Kapsa – Simurq (2013–2015)
- Dawid Pietrzkiewicz – Simurq (2012–2013), Gabala (2013–2014, 2015–2017)

=== Portugal ===
- Benny – Araz-Naxçıvan (2024–2025)
- Nuno Rodrigues – Araz-Naxçıvan (2023–2026)
- **Bruno Silva** – **Gabala** (2026-)
- Paulino Lopes Tavares – Gabala (2009)
- Yazalde – Gabala (2014)
- **Diogo Almeida** – **İmişli** (2025–)
- **Diogo Cardoso** – **İmişli** (2026–)
- **Asumah Abubakar** – **Kapaz** (2026–)
- Pedro Gomes – Kapaz (2025–2026)
- Igor Rodrigues – Kapaz (2023–2024)
- **Rogerio Santos** – **Kapaz** (2024–2025, 2026–)
- Serginho – Kapaz (2016–2017)
- **Diogo Verdasca** – **Kapaz** (2024–)
- Pisco – Karvan (2025–2026)
- Renato Queirós – Khazar Lankaran (2008–2009)
- António Semedo – Khazar Lankaran (2011–2012)
- Bruno Simão – Khazar Lankaran (2011)
- Hugo Basto – Neftçi (2021–2022)
- Raphael Guzzo – Neftçi (2024–2025)
- **Samuel Lobato** – **Qarabağ** (2026–)
- Pedro Nuno – Sabail (2023–2024)
- Hugo Machado – Standard Sumgayit (2009–2010)
- **Ricardo Apolinario** – **Shamakhi** (2025–)
- **Diogo Balau** – Shamakhi (2025–2026), **Turan Tovuz** (2026-)
- **Ricardo Fernandes** – **Shamakhi** (2024–)
- **Rodrigo Fernandes** – Shamakhi (2026), **Sabah** (2026–)
- **Filipe Marques** – **Shamakhi** (2026–)
- **Jota** – **Shamakhi** (2026–)
- **Rui Pacheco** – **Shamakhi** (2026–)
- **Rui Pacheco** – **Shamakhi** (2026–)
- **Tiago Almeida** – **Sumgayit** (2026-)
- Pedro Pinto – Sumgayit (2025–2026)
- **Jorge Silva** – **Turan Tovuz** (2025-)
- Miguel Lourenço – Zira (2016–2017)
- Tiago Silva – Zira (2023–2026)
- **Vieirinha** – **Zira** (2026–)

=== Republic of Ireland ===
- Joe Kendrick – Neftçi (2008–2009)

=== Romania ===
- Mihay İonesku – Baku
- Amiran Mujiri – Baku, Standard
- Cristian Valentin Muscalu – Baku
- Mihai Panc – Baku
- Marius Pena – Baku
- Daniel Oprița – Baku
- Marius Șuleap – Baku, Inter Baku
- Alexandru Benga – Gabala
- Andrei Cristea – Gabala
- George Florescu – Gabala
- Marius Humenike – Gabala
- Cristian Pulhac – Gabala
- Adrian Ropotan – Gabala
- Răzvan Ţârlea – Gabala, Kəpəz
- Constantin Arbănaş – Khazar Lankaran
- Hristu Chiacu – Khazar Lankaran
- Cătălin Doman – Khazar Lankaran
- Cosmin Frăsinescu – Khazar Lankaran
- Róbert Ilyés – Khazar Lankaran
- Adrian Iordache – Khazar Lankaran
- Cătălin Liță – Khazar Lankaran
- Daniel Munteanu – Khazar Lankaran
- Andrei Mureşan – Khazar Lankaran
- Nicolae Muşat – Khazar Lankaran
- Adrian Piţ – Khazar Lankaran
- Alexandru Piţurcă – Khazar Lankaran
- Claudiu Răducanu – Khazar Lankaran
- Ionuț Savu – Khazar Lankaran
- Adrian Scarlatache – Khazar Lankaran, Keşla (2016–18), Zira (2018–2020)
- Stelian Stancu – Khazar Lankaran
- Marian Aliuță – Neftçi
- Cristian Costin – Neftçi (2025–2026)
- Leonard Naidin – Neftçi
- Adrian Neaga – Neftçi
- Cătălin Țîră – Neftçi
- Darius Miçlea – Sahdag Qusar
- Alexandru Popovici – Sabail (2017)
- **Andrei Dragu** – **Shafa Baku** (2026–)
- **Vlad Pop** – **Shafa Baku** (2026–)
- Andrei Tîrcoveanu – Shamakhi (2025–2026)
- Raul Costin – Simurq
- Marius Vintilă – Standard
- Gabriel Matei – Zira (2017)

=== Russia ===
- Nurməhəmməd Murtuzəliyev – Olimpik Baku
- Qvanzav Məhəmmədov – AZAL
- Arkadi Halperin – AZAL
- Akhmed Kurbanov – Olimpik Baku
- Marat Izmailov – Gabala
- Aliyar Ismailov – Inter Baku
- Aleksandr Avdeyev – Karvan
- Ivan Vasiliev – Karvan, Ravan Baku
- Sergei Bespalykh – Kəpəz
- Murat Gomleshko – Kəpəz
- Aleksey Kaplanov – Kəpəz
- Konstantin Kolesnikov – Kəpəz
- Eduard Kokoyev – Kəpəz
- Sergey Qordun – Kəpəz
- Vladislav Serebriakov – Kəpəz
- Mixail Şişlin – Kəpəz
- Dmitri Smirnov – Kəpəz
- Alan Soltanov – Kəpəz
- Nikolay Svezhentsev – Kəpəz
- Andrei Sveshnikov – Kəpəz
- Aleksandr Çerkasov – MKT Araz
- Artyom Bezrodny – MKT Araz
- Sergey Chernyshev – Mughan (2011), Ravan Baku (2011–12), Turan Tovuz (2012), Sumgayit (2017), Kapaz (2017)
- Nariman Gasanov – Mughan
- İslam Basxanov – Neftçi
- Rafiq Bulatov – Neftçi
- Timur Dzhabrailov – Neftçi
- Anzor İsmayılov – Neftçi
- Aleksandr Krasnyanski – Neftçi
- Məhəmməd Məhəmmədov – Neftçi
- İsmayıl Mirzəyev – Neftçi
- Reziuan Mirzov – Neftçi (2023–2024)
- Anatoli Tebloyev – Neftçi, Gabala
- Aleksandr Bakhtin – Qarabağ
- Adam Ismailov – Qarabağ
- Artur Kişev – Qarabağ, Neftçi
- Dmitri Kudinov – Qarabağ
- Andrey Lunyov – Qarabağ (2023–2024)
- Adam Zeytov – Qarabağ
- Sharapudin Shalbuzov – Ravan Baku
- Ildar Alekperov – Sabah (2021–2024), Araz-Naxçıvan (2024)
- Ayaz Guliyev – Sabah (2023–2026)
- Shamil Lakhiyalov – Shafa Baku
- Sergey Maslov – Shafa Baku
- Avtandil Orudzhev – Shafa Baku, Qarabağ
- Qurban Əliyev – Shahdag Qusar
- Nəriman Fərhadov – Shahdag Qusar
- Timur İsrafilov – Shahdag Qusar
- Tamerlan Məcidov – Shahdag Qusar
- İbrahim Mirzəməhəmmədov – Shahdag Qusar
- Anzur Sadirov – Shahdag Qusar
- Mixail Sudin – Shahdag Qusar
- Ismail Khalinbekov – Shahdag Qusar
- Rustam Shelayev – Shahdag Guba
- Murad Xalidov – Shahdag Qusar
- Artur Yunusov – Shahdag Qusar
- Kamil Yunusov – Shahdag Qusar
- Vasili Yanotovsky – Simurq
- Alan Kusov – Standard Baku
- Vitali Balamestny – Standard Sumgayit, Gabala
- Nasyr Abilayev – Sumgayit
- Dzhamaldin Khodzhaniyazov – Sumgayit (2019–2022)
- Farkhad Gystarov – Sumgayit
- Adil Ibragimov – Sumgayit
- Tavakkyul Mamedov – Sumgayit
- Khayal Mustafayev – Sumgayit
- Shamil Saidov – Turan Tovuz
- Rashid Gasanov – Turan Tovuz
- Marat Dzakhmishev – Turan Tovuz
- **Aleksei Kenyaykin** – **Turan Tovuz** (2024–)
- Ivan Konovalov – Turan Tovuz (2024–2025)
- Sergei Samok – Turan Tovuz (2024–2026)
- Eduard Yeryopkin – Turan Tovuz
- Anton Krachkovsky – Turan Tovuz (2025)

=== Scotland ===
- Andy Halliday – Gabala (2017)
- Graeme Smith – Gabala (2011–12)
- Kyle Spence – Karvan (2025–2026)

=== Serbia ===
- Branislav Arsenijević – AZAL (2011–14)
- Vladimir Bogdanović – AZAL (2013)
- Mirko Bunjevčević – AZAL (2010–10)
- Dragan Mandić – AZAL (2006–11)
- Saša Vučinović – Bakılı Baku (2008)
- Stevan Bates – Baku (2009–10, 2011–12), Khazar Lankaran (2012)
- Dejan Branković – Baku (2008–09)
- Darko Jovandić – Baku (2006–07)
- Nenad Kovačević – Baku (2011–13)
- Risto Ristović – Baku (2013–15)
- Milan Antić – Gabala (2009–12), Kapaz
- Ljuba Baranin – Gabala (2009–11), Kapaz (2011)
- Milan Marinković – Gabala (2009)
- Nikola Valentić – Gabala (2013–14)
- Veseljko Trivunović – Gabala (2011–12)
- **Nikola Karaklajić** – **İmişli** (2025–)
- Goran Arnaut – Inter Baku (2007–10)
- Igor Dimitrijević – Inter Baku (2005), Shahdag Qusar (2006)
- Nikola Jolović – Inter Baku (2006–07)
- Marko Petrović – Inter Baku (2008–09)
- Vojislav Stanković – Inter Baku (2014–17), Gabala (2015–16, 2017–2019), Neftçi (2019–2023)
- Milan Zagorac – Inter Baku (2005–10)
- Vladimir Zelenbaba – Kapaz (2011)
- Miloš Bosančić – Keşla (2018), Sabah (2018–2019)
- Nikola Mitrović – Keşla (2018–2019)
- Milorad Korać – Khazar Lankaran (2004–06)
- Uroš Predić – Khazar Lankaran (2004)
- Marinko Petković – Khazar Lankaran (2005–06)
- Miroslav Savić – Khazar Lankaran (2004–06), Masallı (2006–08)
- Miloš Zečević – Mughan (2007–11), Ravan Baku (2011–13)
- Vladimir Mićović – Neftçi (2005–10)
- **Dragoljub Savić** – **Neftçi** (2026–)
- Petar Škuletić – Sabah (2021)
- Saša Stamenković – Neftçi (2011–15), Sabah (2018–2021)
- Mirko Babić – Olympic Baku (2005–06)
- Srđan Baljak – Olympic Baku (2005)
- Marko Mitrović – Olympic Baku (2005–06)
- Zoran Cilinšek – Qarabağ (2006)
- Bojan Pavlović – Qarabağ (2011–12)
- Bojan Ilić – Qarabağ (2005–07), Baku (2007)
- Uroš Matić – Qarabağ (2020–2021)
- Bojan Šaranov – Qarabağ (2016–17)
- Slobodan Sladojević – Qarabağ (2006–07)
- Miloš Adamović – Ravan Baku (2013–14)
- Nemanja Vidaković – Ravan Baku (2011–13)
- Filip Ivanović – Sabah (2018–2021)
- Njegoš Kupusović – Sabah (2024–2025)
- **Veljko Simić** – **Sabah** (2025–)
- Matija Ljujić – Sabail (2023)
- Marko Nikolić – Sabail (2025)
- Vasilije Bakić – Shamakhi (2024–2025)
- Dragan Perišić – Simurq (2009–10)
- Nenad Begović – Simurq (2009)
- Dragan Ćeran – Simurq (2013–15)
- Marko Stanojević – Simurq (2014–15)
- Nenad Stojanović – Simurq (2012–13)
- Dejan Đenić – Standard Baku (2007)
- Ognjen Paripović – Standard Baku (2007–08)
- Damjan Daničić – Sumgayit (2022)
- **Aleksa Janković** – **Sumgayit** (2025-)
- Nikola Ninković – Sumgayit (2023-2026)
- Zoran Cvetković – Turan Tovuz (2008)
- **Filip Damjanović** – **Turan Tovuz** (2026–)
- Saša Kovačević – Turan Tovuz (2005–06), Olympic Baku (2006)
- Nemanja Anđelković – Zira (2021–2023)
- Lazar Đorđević – Zira (2020–2021)
- Milan Đurić – Zira (2016–2018)
- Jovan Krneta – Zira (2015–2018)
- Andrija Luković – Zira (2022-2024)
- Miloš Radivojević – Zira (2018–2019)

=== Slovakia ===
- Pavol Farkaš – Gabala (2014–2015)
- Peter Chrappan – Inter Baku (2011–2012)
- Ivan Pecha – Khazar Lankaran (2009–2010), Ravan Baku (2013)
- **Ľubomír Tupta** – **Neftçi** (2026–)
- Pavol Šafranko – Sabah (2024–2026)
- Kamil Kopúnek – Ravan Baku (2014)

=== Slovenia ===
- Lucas Horvat – Baku (2012–2015)
- Jure Travner – Baku (2013–2015)
- Dejan Kelhar – Gabala (2012–2013)
- Nicolas Rajsel – Gabala (2020–2021), Sabail (2021–2022)
- Luka Žinko – Gabala (2013)
- Dejan Rusič – Khazar Lankaran (2011–2012)
- Tomislav Mišura – Neftçi (2005–2006)
- Michal Peškovič – Neftçi (2015)
- Mitja Mörec – Ravan Baku (2014)

=== Spain ===
- **Alberto Fernández** – **Araz-Naxçıvan** (2026–)
- Juanfran – AZAL (2012–2015), Inter Baku (2015)
- Koke – Baku (2012)
- Mario Rubio – Baku (2013–2014)
- Mario – Baku (2013–2014)
- Alberto Noguera – Baku (2013–2014)
- Rubén – Baku (2013–2014)
- Fernań López – Gabala (2019–2020, 2021–2022)
- **Jaime Sierra** – **Gabala** (2025–)
- Mikel Álvaro – Inter Baku (2013–2015)
- Iván Benítez – Inter Baku (2013–2015)
- Toni Doblas – Khazar Lankaran (2013)
- Eduard Oriol – Khazar Lankaran (2013–2014)
- Mario Rosas – Khazar Lankaran (2011–2012)
- Añete – Neftçi (2015–2016)
- Daniel Lucas – Neftçi (2017)
- Míchel – Qarabağ (2015–2020)
- **Joni Montiel** – **Qarabağ** (2025–)
- Gaspar Panadero – Qarabağ (2021–2023)
- Dani Quintana – Qarabağ (2015–2020)
- Jaime Romero – Qarabağ (2019–2022)
- Juan Cámara – Sabah (2021–2022)
- Cristian Ceballos – Sabah (2021–2024)
- Gorka Larrucea – Sabail (2023–2025)
- Melli – Simurq (2015), Neftçi (2015–2016)
- **Roberto Olabe** – **Turan Tovuz** (2025-)
- **Álex Serrano** – **Turan Tovuz** (2023-)
- Tato – Zira (2015–2016)

=== Sweden ===
- Freddy Borg – AZAL (2013)
- Nadir Benchenaa- Khazar Lankaran (2009)
- John Pelu- Mughan, Ravan Baku (2011–2012)
- Samuel Armenteros – Qarabağ (2015–2016)
- Sebastian Castro-Tello – Ravan Baku (2013)
- Fredrik Holster – Ravan Baku (2013–2014)
- **Marko Johansson** – **Sumgayit** (2026-)

=== Switzerland ===
- Danijel Subotić – Gabala (2014–2015, 2017)
- Innocent Emeghara – Qarabağ (2014–2015, 2018–2019)
- **Karim Rossi** – Shamakhi (2025–2026), **Gabala** (2026-)

=== Turkey ===
- Mehmet Əli – Qarabağ
- Can Akgün – Sumgayit
- Göksel Akıncı – Khazar Lankaran
- Mehmet Ali Arslan – Gänclärbirliyi Sumqayit
- Muhammad Ali Atam – Sumgayit
- Devran Ayhan – Khazar Lankaran, Qarabağ
- Ali Cansun – Neftçi
- Erdal Çelik – Sumgayit
- Seyid Cem – Gänclärbirliyi Sumqayit
- Firat Çırçı – Bakili Baku, Shafa Baku
- Hakan Demir – Qarabağ
- Oktay Derelioğlu – Khazar Lankaran
- Ahmet Dursun – Khazar Lankaran
- Kürşat Duymuş – Baku
- Ferdi Elmas – Baku
- Muammer Erdoğdu – Khazar Lankaran, Turan Tovuz, Kəpəz, Gabala
- Gökhan Güleç – Khazar Lankaran
- Erman Güraçar – Gänclärbirliyi Sumqayit
- Çətin Günər – Gänclärbirliyi Sumqayit
- Mehmet Kahraman – Gänclärbirliyi Sumqayit
- Tunc Kip – Khazar Lankaran
- Dəniz Kolqu – Khazar Lankaran
- Məsut Kumçuoğlu – Khazar Lankaran
- İbrahim Mandiralı – Gänclärbirliyi Sumqayit
- Abdulkadir Öz – AZAL, Gabala, Bakili Baku
- Mustafa Engin Özmən – Qarabağ
- Ahmet Öztürk – Gänclärbirliyi Sumqayit
- Fatih Sonkaya – Khazar Lankaran
- Aydın Tuna – Karvan
- Əhməd Ünal – FK Gäncä
- Suat Usta – Neftçi
- Mustafa Xeyri – Inshaatchi Baku
- Atilla Yildirim – Sumgayit (2018–2019)
- **Eren Aydın** – **Zira** (2026–)

=== Ukraine ===
- Valeriy Kutsenko – AZAL (2015), Keşla (2019)
- Serhiy Puchkov– Bakili Baku
- Viktor Kulikov – Bakili Baku, Shamkir
- Ruslan Levyha – Baku
- Stanislav Loban – Baku
- Oleksiy Antonov – Gabala
- Dmytro Bezotosnyi – Gabala (2015–2019)
- Volodymyr Bondarchuk – Gabala
- Ruslan Fomin – Gabala
- Ramil Hasanov – Gabala (2014–2018), Sumgayit (2017)
- Oleksiy Hai – Gabala
- Mykola Hibalyuk – Gabala
- Ihor Melnyk – Gabala
- Oleh Osadchyi – Gabala
- Maksym Skorokhodov – Gabala
- Andriy Stryzhak – Gabala (2022-2023)
- Vitaliy Vernydub – Gabala (2015–2018)
- Andriy Kandzyuk – Gänclärbirliyi Sumqayit
- Dmytro Veremchuk – Gänclärbirliyi Sumqayit
- Sergei Chernykh – Inter Baku
- Andriy Davydenko – Inter Baku
- Oleksandr Kiryukhin – Inter Baku
- Yevhen Kotov – Inter Baku
- Serhiy Konovalov – Inter Baku
- Serhiy Onopko – Inter Baku
- Oleh Ostapenko – Inter Baku
- Oleksandr Mazinchuk – Karat Baki
- Artur Buzila – Karat Baki
- Andriy Danayev – Kapaz, Simurq
- Yuriy Fomenko – Kapaz (2010–2013), Inter Baku (2013, 2015–2016), AZAL (2013)
- Anton Hay – Kapaz (2011)
- Ihor Korotetskyi – Kapaz (2018), Sabail (2018–2019)
- Serhiy Litovchenko – Kapaz (2018)
- Giuli Mandzhgaladze – Kapaz (2018)
- Andriy Sidelnikov – Kapaz
- Serhiy Skirda – Kapaz
- Oleksandr Sytnik – Kapaz (2015)
- Dmytro Klyots – Keşla (2020–2021), Sabah (2021)
- Valeriy Kutsenko – Keşla (2019)
- Yevhen Kopyl – Khazar Lankaran (2011)
- Oleksandr Babak – MKT Araz
- Ihor Makovey – MKT Araz
- Dmytro Parkhomenko – MKT Araz
- Yevhen Shyman – MKT Araz
- Vitaliy Stepanovych – MKT Araz
- Valentyn Vyshtalyuk – MKT Araz
- Oleh Herasymyuk – Neftçi
- Volodymyr Olefir – Neftçi
- Kyrylo Petrov – Neftçi (2017–2019)
- Roman Zub – Neftçi
- Leonid Kalfa – Neftçi
- **Andriy Shtohrin** – **Neftçi** (2024-)
- Vladislav Slepak – Neftçi
- Serhiy Hrybanov – FK Olimpik Baku
- Volodymyr Bohach – Qarabağ
- Anton Kanibolotskiy – Qarabağ (2017–2018)
- Andrey Kolinenko – Qarabağ
- Serhiy Kravchenko – Qarabağ
- Denys Sokolovskyi – Qarabağ
- Artyom Şubin – Qarabağ
- Oleksandr Voskoboynyk – Qarabağ
- Yuriy Maksymenko – Sahdag Qusar
- Vyacheslav Sidoryuk – Shahdag Qusar, Gabala
- Yasyn Khamid – Ravan Baku, AZAL, Zira
- Kostyantyn Makhnovskyi – Ravan Baku
- Dmytro Bezruk – Sabah (2019–2020)
- Marko Dević – Sabah (2018–2019, 2020)
- Vitaliy Kvashuk – Sabah (2018)
- **Oleksiy Kashchuk** – Sabah (2022–2023), **Qarabağ** (2024–)
- Zurab Ochihava – Sabah (2021–2023), Gabala (2023–2024)
- Oleksandr Rybka – Sabail (2019–2020)
- Maksym Chekh – Sabail (2022–2023)
- Dmytro Lytvyn – Sabail (2024–2025)
- Petro Stasyuk – Sabail (2022–2023)
- Vladyslav Veremyeyev – Shamakhi (2025–2026)
- Serhiy Artiukh – Simurq, Turan Tovuz, Ravan Baku
- Yuriy Bulychev – Simurq
- Taras Chopik – Simurq
- Ruslan Hunchak – Simurq
- Yevhen Kovtunov – Simurq
- Volodymyr Kozlenko – Simurq
- Mykola Lapko – Simurq
- Aleksandr Malygin – Simurq
- Volodymyr Mazyar – Simurq, Standard Baku
- Andriy Nikitin – Simurq
- Vyacheslav Nivinskyi – Simurq
- Oleksandr Poklonskyi – Simurq
- Vitaliy Postranskyi – Simurq
- Andriy Raspopov – Simurq
- Serhiy Ruzhytskyi – Simurq
- Serhiy Seleznyov – Simurq
- Serhiy Shchehlov – Simurq
- Yevhen Shmakov – Simurq
- Andriy Sokolenko – Simurq
- Mykhaylo Starostyak – Simurq
- Oleh Tymchyshyn – Simurq
- Mykola Zbarakh – Simurq
- Danylo Beskorovaynyi – Sumgayit (2026)
- Yuriy Donyushkin – Turan Tovuz
- Serhiy Konyushenko – Turan Tovuz
- Anton Kovalevskyi – Turan Tovuz
- Volodymyr Kress – Turan Tovuz
- Oleksandr Krutskevych – Turan Tovuz, Araz-Naxçıvan
- Andriy Horban – Turan Tovuz
- Yevhen Sayko – Turan Tovuz
- Serhiy Skachenko – Turan Tovuz
- Ruslan Zubkov – Turan Tovuz, Araz-Naxçıvan
- Eldar Kuliyev – Zira (2023–2026)
- Vladyslav Kulach – Zira (2023–2024)

== CONMEBOL ==
=== Argentina ===
- Cristián Ruiz – AZAL (2011)
- Leandro Becerra – Baku (2012–2014)
- Guillermo Leyvo – Baku (2004–2005)
- Fernando Néstor Pérez – Baku (2004–2005, 2007–2009)
- Facundo Pereyra – Gabala (2015–2016)
- Cristian Torres – Gabala (2009–2011), Ravan Baku (2011–2012, 2013), Qarabağ (2013)
- Diego Ruiz – Khazar Lankaran (2010)
- Franco Flores – Shamakhi (2019–2020, 2022)
- Pablo Podio – Keşla (2018)
- Luciano Olguín – Khazar Lankaran (2013)
- Hugo Bargas – Neftçi (2017)
- Jorge Correa – Neftçi (2021–2022)
- Lucas Gómez – Neftçi (2018)
- Lucas Melano – Neftçi (2023–2024)
- Juan Manuel Varea – Ravan Baku (2012–2014)
- Imanol Iriberri – Sabail (2019)
- Facundo Cardozo – Sabail (2022–2023)
- Franco Mazurek – Sabail (2022–2023)
- Julian Gonzalo Varennes – Standard Baku (2008–2009)
- Facundo Melivilo – Zira (2021)

=== Bolivia ===
- Edemir Rodríguez – Baku (2012–2013)
- Augusto Andaveris – Inter Baku (2008–2009)
- Julio César Cortez – Standard Baku (2008)

=== Brazil ===
- **Arthur** – **Araz-Naxçıvan** (2026–)
- **Bruno Franco** – **Araz-Naxçıvan** (2025–)
- Jatobá – Araz-Naxçıvan (2024–2025)
- Wanderson Maranhão – Araz-Naxçıvan (2023–2026)
- **Igor Ribeiro** – Araz-Naxçıvan (2023–2025), **Neftçi** (2025–)
- Diano – AZAL (2008–2010)
- Alessandro De Paula – AZAL (2007–2008)
- Eduardo – AZAL (2014–2015), Zira (2015)
- Ismael Silva Francisco – AZAL (2010)
- Junior Ailton – AZAL (2012–2014)
- Nildo – AZAL (2012–2013), Khazar Lankaran (2013–2014), Inter Baku (2014–2015)
- Tales Schutz – AZAL (2011–2012), Inter Baku (2012–2013)
- William Batista – Baku (2009)
- Flatimir Freytas da Cruz – Baku (2004–2005)
- Kristiano Dos Santos – Baku (2004–2005)
- Renatinho – Baku (2004–2005)
- Roberto Andréo Sergio – Baku (2004–2005)
- Carlos Ribero – Baku (2004–2005)
- Etto – Baku (2013–2014)
- Felipe – Baku (2009)
- Jaba– Baku (2009–2012, 2014–2015,)
- Wilson Aparecido Xavier Júnior "Juninho" – Baku (2011–2014)
- Rafael Barbosa – Baku (2009)
- Adriano – Baku (2010)
- Wênio – Baku (2010)
- Lucas Áfrico – Gabala (2023–2024)
- Bruno Anjos – Gabala (2010–2011)
- Lourival Assis – Gabala (2012–2014)
- Bruno – Gabala (2010–2012)
- Daniel Cruz – Gabala (2011–2013)
- Diego – Gabala (2012–2014)
- Dodô – Gabala (2011–2016)
- Erivelto – Gabala (2008)
- **Edson Eduardo** – **Gabala** (2026–)
- Eduardo Kunde – Gabala (2025–2026)
- Leonardo – Gabala (2013–2014)
- Marquinhos – Gabala (2014–2015)
- **Ruan Renato** – Gabala (2021–2023), **Zira** (2023–)
- Rafael Santos – Gabala (2014–2017)
- Patrick – Gabala (2022)
- Raphael Utzig – Gabala (2020–2023), Zira (2024–2025)
- Ricardinho – Gabala (2015–2017)
- Tiago – Gabala (2008)
- **Juninho** – **İmişli** (2025–)
- **Ronaldo Rodrigues** – **İmişli** (2025–)
- **Diogo Rollo** – **İmişli** (2025–)
- **Rafael Viegas** – **İmişli** (2025–)
- Adriano Gabiru – Inter Baku (2008–2009)
- Accioly– Inter Baku (2008–2012)
- Dhiego Martins – Inter Baku (2015)
- Filipe Machado – Inter Baku (2010–2011)
- Cleiton – Inter Baku (2008–2009)
- Robertinho – Inter Baku (2013)
- João Paulo – Inter Baku (2013–2014)
- Flavio Beck – Inter Baku (2013–2014)
- Wilson Júnior – Inter Baku (2008–2010)
- Dário – Kapaz (2015–2017, 2018), Neftçi (2018–2019, 2019–2020)
- Dedimar Ferreira – Kapaz (2017–2018)
- Jefferson Bento – Kapaz (2025–2026)
- João Braga – Kapaz (2024)
- Vitor Feijão – Kapaz (2025–2026)
- Keverton – Kapaz (2024)
- Martins Júnior – Kapaz (2023–2024), Zira (2024–2026)
- Keverton – Kapaz (2024–)
- Renan – Kapaz (2016–2017)
- Tiaqo Roşa dos Santos – Karvan (2009–2010)
- Dias Kleyton – Karvan (2005–2006)
- Junivan – Turan Tovuz (2005, 2009–2010), AZAL (2007–2009), Kəpəz (2010–2012)
- Alvaro – Keşla (2020)
- Artur – Keşla (2020)
- Sílvio – Keşla (2020–2021)
- Beto – Khazar Lankaran (2012)
- Douglas – Khazar Lankaran (2013)
- Éder Bonfim – Khazar Lankaran (2011–2013)
- Cristian – Khazar Lankaran (2010)
- Fernando Gabriel – Khazar Lankaran (2014–2015)
- Osvaldo José Martins Júnior "Juninho" – Khazar Lankaran (2007–2011), Baku (2011–2012), Kapaz (2015–2016)
- Mario Sergio – Khazar Lankaran (2008–2010), Inter Baku (2010), Simurq (2011)
- Diego Souza – Khazar Lankaran (2007–2011), Zira (2015–2016), Kapz (2018–2019)
- Roberto Santos – Khazar Lankaran (2007–2008)
- Rômulo – Khazar Lankaran (2008–2009)
- Osmar Sigueira – Khazar Lankaran (2006–2007), Vilash Masalli (2007–2008), Standard Sumgayit/Baku (2008–2009, 2010)
- Ricardo Vilana – Khazar Lankaran (2011–2012)
- Elias – Khazar Lankaran (2014)
- Deyvid Sacconi – Khazar Lankaran (2013–2014)
- Thiego – Khazar Lankaran (2014)
- Vanderson – Khazar Lankaran (2012–2014)
- Jilmar Da Silva – Kapaz (2004–2005)
- Selso Ferreyra – Vilash Masalli (2007–2008)
- Fabio Ricardo – Vilash Masalli (2007–2008)
- Huqo Saldanhaqos – Vilash Masalli (2007–2008)
- Tomaş Mavrilyo – MKT Araz (2004–2005)
- Alessandro – Neftçi (2010–2012)
- **Breno Almeida** – **Neftçi** (2026–)
- Ailton – Neftçi (2015–2016), Qarabağ (2019–2020)
- Bruno Bertucci – Neftçi (2012–2014)
- Carlos Cardoso – Neftçi (2013–2015)
- Cauê – Neftçi (2014–2015)
- Denílson – Neftçi (2016)
- Flavinho – Neftçi (2010–2015)
- Jairo – Neftçi (2015–2017)
- José Carlos – Neftçi (2008–2010)
- **Gustavo Klismahn** – **Neftçi** (2026–)
- Ramon Machado – Neftçi (2021–2022), Gabala (2022–2023), Araz-Naxçıvan (2024–2026)
- Rodriguinho – Neftçi (2011–2012)
- Thallyson – Neftçi (2020–2021)
- Tiago Bezerra – Neftçi (2021–2022)
- Alex Fernandes – Neftçi (2025)
- Yuri Matias – Neftçi (2023–2025)
- Guilherme Pato – Neftçi (2022–2023)
- Pessalli – Neftçi (2016)
- Saldanha – Neftçi (2023)
- Andre Shinyashiki – Neftçi (2023–2024)
- Denis Silva – Khazar Lankaran (2008–2010), Neftçi (2010–2012, 2013–2015), Keşla (2015–2019)
- **Dani Bolt** – **Qarabağ** (2025–)
- Chumbinho – Qarabağ (2013–2015)
- Danilo Dias – Qarabağ (2014–2015)
- Pedro Henrique – Qarabağ (2017–2018)
- Juninho – Qarabağ (2023–2025)
- **Kady** – **Qarabağ** (2021–2023, 2025–)
- **Pedro Bicalho** – **Qarabağ** (2025–)
- Reynaldo – Qarabağ (2013–2017, 2019)
- Júlio Romão – Qarabağ (2022–2025)
- **Diego Rosa** – **Qarabağ** (2026–)
- **Matheus Silva** – **Qarabağ** (2022–)
- Vagner – Qarabağ (2018–2020)
- Igor Souza – Mughan (2010–2011), Ravan Baku (2011)
- Júlio César – Ravan Baku (2014)
- Thiago Miracema – Ravan Baku (2014–)
- **Erivaldo Almeida** – **Sabah** (2026–)
- **Andrey** – **Sabah** (2025–)
- Christian – Sabah (2022–2024), Turan Tovuz (2024–2025)
- **Carlos Eduardo** – **Sabah** (2025–)
- Higor Gabriel – Sabah (2022–2023)
- Ygor Nogueira – Sabah (2022–2026)
- **Du Queiroz** – **Sabah** (2025–)
- Lucas Rangel – Sabah (2022)
- Wanderson – Sabah (2018–2019)
- Renan Telles – Sabail (2017)
- Henrique – Sabail (2018–2019)
- Erico – Sabail (2019–2020)
- Gustavo França – Sabail (2022–2023)
- Michael Thuíque – Shamakhi (2025)
- Cézar – Shamakhi (2025–2026)
- António Lara – Shamakhi (2025–2026)
- David – Shamakhi (2025–2026)
- Anderson do Ó – Simurq (2012–2014)
- **Luís Felipe** – **Shafa Baku** (2026–)
- Léo Rocha – Standard Baku (2007), Inter Baku (2009–2010, 2013), Baku (2010), Qarabağ (2011)
- Adriano Peixe – Standard Sumgayit (2008–2009)
- Rodrigo Silva – Standard Sumgayit (2009)
- **Lucas Black** – **Sumgayit** (2026–)
- Diego Carioca – Sumgayit (2023)
- Alan Dias – Sumgayit (2024-2025)
- **Jean** – **Sumgayit** (2025–)
- **Keffel** – **Sumgayit** (2025–)
- **Renan Santana** – **Sumgayit** (2026–)
- Fernando Medeiros – Sumgayit (2024)
- Octávio – Sumgayit (2023-2024)
- Brunão – Turan Tovuz (2023-2024)
- **Henrique** – **Turan Tovuz** (2025–)
- **Jô** – **Turan Tovuz** (2025–)
- Kauan – Turan Tovuz (2025)
- Pachu – Turan Tovuz (2023-2024), Kapaz (2024–2026)
- Alex Souza – Turan Tovuz (2024-2026)
- Rudison – Turan Tovuz (2011)
- Marco Tulio– Turan Tovuz (2010–2011)
- Matheus Albino – Zira (2020–2021)
- **Henrique** – **Zira** (2025–)
- **Ktatau** – **Zira** (2026–)
- Filipe Pachtmann – Zira (2021–2024)
- Caio Rangel – Zira (2020–2021)
- Welves – Zira (2021)

=== Chile ===
- Rodrigo Gattas – Gabala (2020)
- José Cabión – Neftçi (2013)
- Nicolás Canales – Neftçi (2012–2013, 2014–2015, 2016)
- Ignacio Herrera – Neftçi (2017–2018)

=== Colombia ===
- John Córdoba – AZAL (2014)
- Jefferson Angulo- Baku (2010)
- **Edwin Banguera** – **İmişli** (2025–)
- **Juan Hernández** – **İmişli** (2025–)
- Jorge Díaz Moreno – Khazar Lankaran (2006)
- Rodrigo Rosa Sales – Khazar Lankaran (2006–2007)
- Mike Campaz – Neftçi (2018)
- Brayan Moreno – Neftçi (2024)
- Camilo Durán – Qarabağ (2025–2026)
- Kevin Medina – Qarabağ (2020–2026)
- **Haiderson Hurtado** – **Turan Tovuz** (2025–)

=== Ecuador ===
- Jordan Rezabala – Sumgayit (2024), Neftçi (2025–2026)

=== French Guiana ===
- **Imani Barker** – Karvan (2025–2026), **Sumgayit** (2026–)

=== Paraguay ===
- Isrrael Rodríguez – Baku (2007), Standard Baku (2008)
- César Meza – Inter Baku (2013–2015, 2016), Zira (2016–2017, 2024), Keşla (2018, 2019–2020, 2020–2021), Neftçi (2021–2023), Araz-Naxçıvan (2024–2025)
- David Meza – Inter Baku (2013–2015), Gabala (2015), Neftçi (2017–2018)
- Lorenzo Frutos – Keşla (2019–2020)
- Francisco García – Neftçi (2018)
- Luis Ortíz – Neftçi (2025–2026)
- Eric Ramos – Neftçi (2014–2016), Sabah (2018–2019)
- Mudo Valdez – Neftçi (2023–2024)
- Julio Rodríguez – Zira (2019–2020), Sabah (2020–2022)

=== Peru ===
- Álvaro Ampuero – Zira (2019–2020)

=== Uruguay ===
- Román Cuello – Inter Baku (2008)
- Angel Gutierrez – Standard Baku (2008–2009), Inter Baku (2009–2010), FK Mughan (2010–2011), Ravan Baku (2011)
- Walter Guglielmone – Inter Baku (2007–2009), Neftçi (2009–2010)
- Álvaro Villete – Sabah (2020–2021)
- Daniel Martínez – Standard Baku (2007–2008)
- Richard Requelme Chiappa – Standard Sumgayit (2009–2010)

=== Venezuela ===
- Ángelo Peña – Keşla (2019)
- Edson Castillo – Neftçi (2016–2017)
- **Freddy Vargas** – **Neftçi** (2025–)

== CAF ==
=== Algeria ===
- Yacine Hima – Neftçi (2011)
- Yassine Benzia – Qarabağ (2023–2025)
- Ishak Belfodil – Sabah (2023–2024)
- **Akim Zedadka** – **Sabah** (2025–)
- Bilal Hamdi – Zira (2018–2019)

=== Angola ===
- **Paulo Guimbila** – **Gabala** (2025–)
- **Deco** – **İmişli** (2026–)
- Alexander Christovão – Keşla (2020–2021)
- Paná – Sabail (2023–2024), Kapaz (2024–2025)
- Aldair Neto – Shamakhi (2021–2022)

=== Benin ===
- Felipe Santos – Keşla (2021–2022), Gabala (2022–2023), Araz-Naxçıvan (2024–2026)
- **Sessi D'Almeida** – **Neftçi** (2025–)
- **Abdoul Rachid Moumini** – Sumgayit (2025–2026), **Shamakhi** (2026–)
- Moïse Adiléhou – Zira (2022–2023)

=== Botswana ===
- Mpho Kgaswane – Zira (2019–2020)

=== Burkina Faso ===
- **Issouf Paro** – **Araz-Naxçıvan** (2023–)
- **Adama Fofana** – **Kapaz** (2025–)
- Narcisse Yaméogo – Mughan (2009–2010)
- Moussa Traore – Gänclärbirliyi (2005–2006)
- Mayqa Buraimo – Gänclärbirliyi (2005–2006)
- Issa Nikiema – Gänclärbirliyi (2004–2005, 2006–2007), Turan Tovuz (2005)
- **Cedric Badolo** – **Sumgayit** (2026-)
- **Mamady Bangré** – **Sumgayit** (2026-)
- Ben Aziz Dao – Turan Tovuz (2022–2023)

=== Burundi ===
- **Sudi Abdallah** – **Araz-Naxçıvan** (2026–)
- '**Trésor Mossi** – **Sumgayit** (2023–)

=== Cameroon ===
- Joël Epalle – Baku (2010–2011)
- Christophe Atangana – Gabala (2021-2024)
- Jeando Fuchs – Gabala (2025-2026)
- Kristian Makqoun – Gänclärbirliyi Sumqayit (2005)
- Ernest Emako-Siankam – Gänclärbirliyi Sumqayit (2005)
- Ghislain Aime Emo – Karvan (2008–2009)
- Guy Feutchine – Kapaz (2010–2012)
- Patrice Noukeu – Kapaz (2010–2011)
- Anatole Abang – Keşla (2021)
- Hervé Tchami – Keşla (2018)
- Mbilla Etame – Khazar Lankaran (2013–2014)
- Julien Ebah – Kapaz (2015–2017)
- Valentine Atem – Neftçi (2009–2010)
- Ernest Nfor – Neftçi (2013–2015)
- Bong Bertrand- Ravan Baku (2011)
- Michel Balokog – Ravan Baku (2013–2014)
- Romuald Onana – Turan Tovuz (2009–2010)
- Rooney Eva – Turan Tovuz (2022-2023)
- Rodrigue Bongongui – Zira (2021)
- Joseph Boum – Zira (2017–2018)

=== Cape Verde ===
- Leandro Andrade – Qarabağ (2022–2026)
- **Patrick Andrade** – Qarabağ (2020–2022, 2023–2025), **Araz-Naxçıvan** (2025–)
- Vargas Fernandes – Standard Sumgayit (2009–2010)
- Steven Pereira – Sumgayit (2022-2023)
- **David Tavares** – **Turan Tovuz** (2025–)

=== Central African Republic ===
- David Manga – Zira (2017)

=== Chad ===
- Casimir Ninga – Sumgayit (2023–2024)

=== Congo ===
- Domi Massoumou – Gabala (2025–2026)
- Bruce Abdoulaye – Inter Baku (2012–2014)
- Muteba Mwanza – MKT Araz (2004–2006), Olimpik Baku (2006–2007)
- Prince Ibara – Neftçi (2020)
- Dzon Delarge – Qarabağ (2018–2019)
- Ulrich Kapolongo – Qarabağ (2013–2014)
- Kévin Koubemba – Sabail (2018–2019), Sabah (2020–2021)
- Nsana Simon – Sumgayit (2025–2026)

=== Democratic Republic of the Congo ===
- Elvis Mashike – Araz-Naxçıvan (2023–2024)
- Freddy Mombongo-Dues – AZAL (2014–2015)
- David Mbomboko Fiston Ngoy – Gabala (2007)
- **Nathan Monzango** – **Gabala** (2026–)
- Moise Ngwisani – Karvan (2025–2026)
- Lema Mabidi – Sabail (2020)

=== Egypt ===
- Mustafa Moshir– Gänclärbirliyi Sumqayit (2006–2007)
- Ahmed Ghanem Soltan – Gänclärbirliyi Sumqayit (2006–2007)
- Islam Emad – Kapaz (2011–2012)
- Mostafa Afroto – Qarabağ (2012–2013)

=== Gabon ===
- **Orphé Mbina** – **Sabah** (2026–)

=== Gambia ===
- **Maudo Jarjué** – Sabail (2017–2019), **Shafa Baku** (2026–)
- Ebrima Sohna – Keşla (2018)
- Dembo Darboe – Neftçi (2023–2025)

=== Ghana ===
- Mohammed Kadiri – Araz-Naxçıvan (2023–2024)
- **Isaac Amoah** – **Gabala** (2025–)
- Prince Owusu – Gabala (2025–2026)
- Samuel Tetteh – Gabala (2023–2024)
- Ezekiel Morgan – İmişli (2025–2026)
- **Yaw Moses** – **İmişli** (2025–)
- Edmond N'Tiamoah – Khazar Lankaran (2007)
- Kingsley Atakorah – Khazar Lankaran
- Godsway Donyoh – Neftçi (2022–2023)
- Kwame Karikari – Neftçi (2018–2019)
- Emmanuel Addai – Qarabağ (2024–2026)
- Owusu Kwabena – Qarabağ (2020–2023)
- Francis Bossman – Ravan Baku (2012)
- Michael Essien – Sabail (2019–2020)
- Karim Abubakar – Sumgayit (2023)
- Seidu Salifu – Turan Tovuz (2012)
- Richard Gadze – Zira (2017–2018, 2019–2020), Sumgayit (2022-2023)

=== Guinea ===
- **Mohamed Mara** – **Araz-Naxçıvan** (2026–)
- Kader Camara – Gabala (2007–2009, 2010–2012), Olimpik-Shuvalan (2009)
- Oumar Kalabane – Gabala (2012–2014)
- Pathé Bangoura – Gänclärbirliyi Sumqayit (2005–2006), Baku (2006), Olimpik Baku (2007–2008)
- Karim Bangoura – Gänclärbirliyi Sumqayit (2007–2008)
- Sekouba Camara – Gänclärbirliyi Sumqayit (2007–2008)
- Saliou Diallo – Gänclärbirliyi Sumqayit (2005–2006, 2007)
- Ibrahima Bangoura – Khazar Lankaran (2011)
- **Mamadou Kane** – Neftçi (2019–2021, 2021), **Araz-Naxçıvan** (2026–)
- Mamaduba Soumah – Qarabağ (2007–2008)
- Amadou Diallo – Sabah (2019–2021)
- **Bafodé Dansoko** – **Shafa Baku** (2026–)
- Momo Yansané – Sumgayit (2025)
- Salifou Soumah – Zira (2023–2025)

=== Guinea-Bissau ===
- David Gomis – Sabail (2023–2025)
- Madi Queta – Sabail (2024–2025)
- Toni Gomes – Zira (2022-2023)

=== Ivory Coast ===
- Adriel Ba Loua – Gabala (2025–2026)
- Serge Djiehoua – Gabala (2011–2012)
- Christian Kouakou – Gabala (2019)
- **Kouya Mabea** – **Gabala** (2026–)
- **Donald Dongo** – **Kapaz** (2025–)
- Yacouba Bamba – Karvan (2005–2007, 2009–2010), Khazar Lankaran (2007–2009)
- Suleyman Camara – Karvan (2005–2008)
- Erwin Koffi – Neftçi (2023–2025)
- Chris Kouakou – Qarabağ (2025–2026)
- Tiemoko Fofana – Sabah (2021–2022)
- Goba Zakpa – Sabail (2022–2023)
- **Moussa Guel** – **Shafa Baku** (2026–)
- Abou Dosso – Sumgayit (2023–2024)
- Stephane Acka – Zira (2023–2026)
- Béko Fofana – Zira (2019)
- **Chris Digbeu** – **Zira** (2026–)
- **Dimitri Legbo** – **Zira** (2026–)
- **Bayéré Junior Loué** – **Zira** (2026–)
- Pierre Zebli – Zira (2023–2025)

=== Kenya ===
- Allan Wanga – Baku (2010)
- Ayub Masika – Sabail (2024)
- Patrick Osiako – Simurq (2013–2015)

=== Liberia ===
- Omega Roberts – AZAL (2017)
- Theo Weeks – Gabala (2016–2017)
- Isaac Pupo – Qarabağ (2007–2008), Mughan (2008–2009)
- Jamal Arago – Sabail (2020–2022)
- Sylvanus Nimely – Sumgayit (2024-2025)
- Terrence Tisdell – Sumgayit (2023)

=== Madagascar ===
- Alexandre Ramalingom – Sabail (2023–2024), Sumgayit (2025–2026)

=== Malawi ===
- Robin Ngalande – Zira (2019–2020)

=== Mali ===
- Famoussa Koné – Gabala (2017–2018)
- Cheick Dao Tidiani – Gänclärbirliyi Sumqayit (2006–2007)
- Samba Diallo – Kapaz (2017)
- Adama Niane – Kapaz (2023–2024)
- Lassana N'Diaye – Kapaz (2024)
- Salif Ballo – Khazar Lankaran (2011–2012), Turan Tovuz (2012–2013), Simurq (2013–2014)
- Sadio Tounkara – Khazar Lankaran (2012–2015), AZAL (2016–2017), Zira (2017–2019), Shamakhi (2021–2022)
- **Falaye Sacko** – **Neftçi** (2025–)
- Ulysse Diallo – Sabah (2019–2021)
- Alya Toure – Sumgayit (2022)

=== Mauritania ===
- Diallo Guidileye – Keşla (2018)

=== Morocco ===
- Zouhir Benouahi – AZAL (2010–2013), Khazar Lankaran (2013–2014)
- **Ayyoub Allach** – Gabala (2023–2024), Araz-Naxçıvan (2025–)
- Karim L'Koucha – Kapaz (2024–2025)
- Sabir Bougrine – Neftçi (2020–2021)
- Alharbi El Jadeyaoui – Qarabağ (2015–2016)
- Samy Mmaee – Qarabağ (2025–2026)
- Faycal Rherras – Qarabağ (2019–2020)
- Sofian Chakla – Sabah (2023–2025)
- **Ayman Bouali** – Sabail (2024–2025), **Shamakhi** (2026–)
- Marouane Hadhoudi – Sabah (2023–2024)
- **Mehdi Mchakhchekh** – **Zira** (2026–)

=== Mozambique ===
- Clésio – Gabala (2019–2020), Zira (2020–2021)
- **Bruno Langa** – **Qarabağ** (2026–)
- **Guima** – **Zira** (2026–)

=== Niger ===
- Ghani Animofoshe – Göyazan Qazax (2004–2006), Olimpik Baku (2006–2007)
- **Issa Djibrilla** – **Zira** (2023–)

=== Nigeria ===
- Victor Igbekoi – Turan Tovuz (2005–2006, 2008–2009), Qarabağ (2006–2008), AZAL (2009–15), Zira (2017–2018)
- Pius Ikedia – AZAL (2010–2011)
- Akeem Latifu – Zira (2017)
- Abiodun Lawal – AZAL (2010–2011)
- Paul Akpan – Turan Tovuz (2007–2009)
- Cud Aqu Aloçukvu – Bakili Baku (2003–2004), Shamkir (2004–2005)
- Akinsaya Abiodin – Bakili Baku (2003–2004)
- Kinqsli Ukusare – Bakili Baku (2003–2004)
- Nkvor Okadinma – Bakili Baku (2004–2005)
- Emanuel Olukayode – Bakili Baku (2004–2005), Göyäzän Qazax (2005–2006)
- Kollins Smuokhuede – Bakili Baku (2004–2005)
- Avqustin Nvabuoku – Bakili Baku (2004–2005)
- Ohioze İke Sondi – Bakili Baku (2004–2005)
- Emanuel Ode – Bakili Baku (2003–2004), Shafa Baku FKShafa Baku (2004–2005)
- Ahmad Tijani – Shahdag Qusar (2005–2007), Baku (2007–10)
- James Adeniyi – Gabala (2018–2019, 2020-2021)
- Abdulwaheed Afolabi – Gabala (2013–14)
- **Ismahil Akinade** – **Gabala** (2026-)
- Ekigho Ehiosun – Gabala (2014–15, 2017)
- Ifeanyi Emeghara – Gabala (2018–)
- **Meshack Ubochioma** – **Gabala** (2026-)
- Siti Abdul Taured – Gänclärbirliyi Sumqayit (2005–2008)
- Fisayo Abayomi – Göyäzän Qazax (2004–2006)
- Tony Alegbe – Inter Baku (2006–2007)
- Lucky Idahor – Inter Baku (2004–2006)
- Victor Oseghale – Kapaz (2017)
- **Benito** – **Kapaz** (2026–)
- Olawale Onanuga – Kapaz (2023–2024, 2025–2026)
- **Abdullahi Shuaibu** – Kapaz (2022–2024), **Shamakhi** (2025–)
- Niji Adekumne – Karvan (2007–2008)
- Olawale Doyeni – Karvan (2025–2026)
- Peter Kings – Karvan (2025–2026)
- Uchenna Okonkwo – Karvan (2007–2008)
- Gavi Thompson – Karvan (2025–2026)
- Nathan Oduwa – Shamakhi (2022), Turan Tovuz (2022-2023)
- Emeka Opara – Khazar Lankaran (2009–2011), Qarabağ (2013)
- **Adeleke Akinyemi** – **Neftçi** (2026–)
- **Ifeanyi Mathew** – **Neftçi** (2025–)
- Yusuf Lawal – Neftçi (2020–2023), Zira (2024–2025)
- Aaron Olanare – Neftçi (2023–2024)
- Stanley Udenkwor – Neftçi (2004)
- Ali Abubakr – MKT Araz (2004–2005)
- Mondey Etove – MKT Araz (2004–2005)
- **Taofeek Ismaheel** – **Qarabağ** (2026–)
- Oke Akpoveta – Ravan Baku (2014), Sabail (2019)
- Emmanuel Apeh – Sabah (2022–2024)
- **Japhet Bulus** – **Sabah** (2026–)
- **Christian Nwachukwu** – **Sabah** (2026–)
- **Timilehin Oluwaseun** – **Sabah** (2024–)
- Jesse Sekidika – Sabah (2023–)
- Erik Obidike – Sahdag Qusar (2004–2005), Turan Tovuz (2007–2008), Mughan (2008), MOIK Baku (2009)
- Səid Saladoye – Sahdag Qusar (2005–2006)
- Amadi Luki – Shafa Baku (2004–2005)
- Uçenna Eme – Shafa Baku (2004–2005)
- Antoni Fouye – Turan Tovuz (2008–2009)
- Otto John – Turan Tovuz (2023-2024)
- Peter Kolawole – Turan Tovuz (2009–2010)
- Henry Okebugwu – Turan Tovuz (2022-2023)
- Abbas Ibrahim – Zira (2023–2024)
- Ahmed Isaiah – Zira (2022), Kapaz (2022–2023), Gabala (2023–2024)
- Chimezie Mbah – Zira (2015–2016)

=== Rwanda ===
- **Joy-Lance Mickels** – **Sabah** (2021–2023, 2024–)
- Joy-Slayd Mickels – Karvan (2025–2026)
- Leroy-Jacques Mickels – Shamakhi (2024–2025), Zira (2025–2026)
- **Ange Mutsinzi** – **Zira** (2024–)
- Innocent Nshuti – Sabail (2025)

=== São Tomé and Príncipe ===
- Pedro Mateus – Karvan (2025–2026)
- Harramiz – Neftçi (2021–2022)

=== Senegal ===
- Kalidou Cissokho – Baku (2004–2012)
- Ely Cissé – Baku (2007–2008)
- Moustapha Dabo – Gabala (2013)
- Seydina Keita – Gabala (2026)
- Victor Mendy – Gabala (2011–2015)
- Ibrahima Niasse – Inter Baku (2012–2013), Gabala (2013–2014, 2019–2020)
- Aladji Mansour Ba – Kapaz (2017)
- **Mahamadou Ba** – **Kapaz** (2024–)
- Latyr Fall – Kapaz (2023–2024)
- Oumar Goudiaby – Keşla (2021)
- Mamadou Mbodj – Neftçi (2019–2022)
- **Moustapha Seck** – **Neftçi** (2023–)
- Magaye Gueye – Qarabağ (2019–2020)
- **Ibrahima Wadji** – Qarabağ (2021–2022), **Turan Tovuz** (2025-)
- Abdoulaye Ba – Sabah (2022–2023)
- Pape Samba Ba – Shamkir (2004), Karvan (2005)
- Escort Essong – Shamkir (2004–2005)
- Sidi Diop – Turan Tovuz (2004–2005)

=== Sierra Leone ===
- Ibrahim Kargbo – Baku (2010–2013)
- Al Bangura – Gabala (2011)
- Sidney Kargbo – Kapaz (2008)
- John Kamara – Keşla (2019–2021)
- Alfred Sankoh – Khazar Lankaran (2014–2015)
- Julius Wobay – Khazar Lankaran (2011), Neftçi (2012–2015)
- Kabba Samura – Mughan (2009–2010)
- Samuel Barlay – Mughan (2010), Ravan Baku (2011–2013, 2015–2016), AZAL (2013–2014)
- Alpha Conteh – Neftçi (2024-2025)
- Sallieu Bundu – Ravan Baku (2012)
- Sheriff Suma – Ravan Baku (2011–2012, 2015)
- Alie Sesay – Zira (2020–2021), Sabail (2021)

=== South Africa ===
- Dino Ndlovu – Qarabağ (2016–2018)
- Hendrick Ekstein – Sabah (2019), Sabail (2020–2021)
- **Aden McCarthy** – **Sabah** (2026–)
- Siyanda Xulu – Turan Tovuz (2022-2023)

=== Sri Lanka ===
- Sam Durrant – Karvan (2025–2026)

=== Tanzania ===
- Alphonce Msanga – Shamakhi (2025–2026)

=== Togo ===
- Daré Nibombé – Baku (2010)
- Yaovi Akakpo – Gabala (2020–2024)
- Arafat Djako – Inter Baku (2012)
- Jonathan Ayité – Keşla (2018–2019)
- Lalawélé Atakora – Gabala (2018–2019)
- Ouro-Nile Toure – Sumgayit (2022)
- **Emmanuel Hackman** – **Turan Tovuz** (2023–)

=== Tunisia ===
- Bechir Mogaadi – Karvan (2004–2007, 2009–2010), Olimpik Baku (2008–2009)
- Emir Mkademi – Karvan (2005)

=== Uganda ===
- Luwagga Kizito – Sabail (2022–2023)
- Farouk Miya – Sabail (2018)

=== Uganda ===
- **Kenneth Kalunga** – **Kapaz** (2026–)

== AFC ==
=== Australia ===
- John Tambouras– Neftçi (2008–09)

=== Hong Kong ===
- Brian Fok – AZAL (2016)

=== Iran ===
- Farzad Hatami – Gabala (2008–09)
- Saeed Irankhah – Karvan (2025)
- Saman Nariman Jahan – Neftçi (2020–2021)
- Reza Bigbelo – Sabah (2018–2019)
- Peyman Keshavarzi – Sabail (2020–2021), Kapaz (2022)
- Bakhtiar Rahmani – Sabail (2020–)
- Ebrahim Abednezhad – Sumgayit (2016)
- Peyman Babaei – Sumgayit (2019–)
- Saeid Bagherpasand – Sumgayit (2021–2022)
- Mehdi Sharifi – Sumgayit (2019–2020, 2021)
- Afshin Esmaeilzadeh – Sumgayit (2016)
- Arash Ghaderi – Turan Tovuz (2024–2025)

=== Japan ===
- Keisuke Honda – Neftçi (2021)
- Ryonosuke Ohori – Neftçi (2025–2026), Kapaz (2025–2026),
- **Masaki Murata** – **Sumgayit** (2023-2024, 2025-)

=== Jordan ===
- Omar Hani – Gabala (2021-2024)

=== Malaysia ===
- Jon Irazabal – Sabah (2022–2025)

=== Pakistan ===
- **Easah Suliman** – **Sumgayit** (2023-)

=== Palestine ===
- Ataa Jaber – Neftçi (2022–2024)

=== Philippines ===
- Álvaro Silva – Khazar Lankaran (2013–2014)

=== Tajikistan ===
- Akhtam Khamrakulov – AZAL (2014)
- Davron Ergashev – Gabala (2014)
- Shervoni Mabatshoev – Kapaz (2025)
- Sokhib Suvonkulov – Ravan Baku (2013)
- **Oleg Baklov** – **Turan Tovuz** (2025-)

=== Turkmenistan ===
- Elman Tagaýew – AZAL (2012–13), Sabail (2017–2018)
- Timur Annamammedov – Karvan –
- Döwletmyrat Ataýew – Karvan (2009–10)
- Nazar Baýramow – Karvan (2004–07), Neftçi (2007–09)
- Omar Berdiýew – Karvan (2009–10)
- Mämmedaly Garadanow – Karvan (2007–08)
- Myrat Hamraýew – Karvan 2009–2010
- Pavel Kharchik – Karvan (2009), Standard Sumgayit (2010)
- Mekan Nasyrow – Karvan (2004–08), Gabala (2008–09)
- Berdi Şamyradow – Karvan (2004–05)
- Rahimberdi Baltaýew – Kapaz (2003)
- Pirkuli Saparov – Kapaz (2012–13)
- Dmitri Nezhelev – Khazar Lankaran (2004)
- Arif Mirzoýew – Neftçi, Qarabağ (2003–04)
- Wahyt Orazsähedow – Sabail (2018)

=== South Korea ===
- Yoon Soung-min – Gänclärbirliyi Sumqayit (2004–05)

=== Uzbekistan ===
- Shohrux Gadoyev – Keşla (2020)
- Bahodir Nasimov – Neftçi (2010–2011, 2011–2014), Keşla (2018),
- Alibobo Rakhmatullaev – Ravan Baku (2015)
- Oleg Belyakov – Turan Tovuz (2004–2005)
- **Umarali Rakhmonaliev** – **Sabah** (2025–)
- Bobur Abdikholikov – Sumgayit (2024–2025)
- Jasurbek Jaloliddinov – Sumgayit (2024–2025)

== CONCACAF ==
=== Canada ===
- **Trayvon Fuller** – **Shafa Baku** (2026–)
- Adam Hemati – Sumgayit (2020)

=== Costa Rica ===
- Randall Brenes – Khazar Lankaran (2012)
- Diego Madrigal – Inter Baku (2014–15)
- Winston Parks – Khazar Lankaran (2010–11), Baku (2011–12)

=== Curaçao ===
- Ayrton Statie – Sabail (2017–2018)
- Jearl Margaritha – Sabah (2023–2024)
- **Xander Severina** – **Sabah** (2026–)
- Rihairo Meulens – Zira (2015–16)

=== Dominican Republic ===
- Heinz Barmettler – Inter Baku (2012)
- **Ronaldo Vásquez** – **Sumgayit** (2025–)

=== El Salvador ===
- Nelson Bonilla – Zira (2015–2016)

=== Guadeloupe ===
- **Andreaw Gravillon** – **Neftçi** (2026–)
- **Steve Solvet** – **Sabah** (2025–)

=== Guatemala ===
- Nicholas Hagen – Sabail (2020–2021)

=== Haiti ===
- Soni Mustivar – Neftçi (2018–2020)
- Wilde-Donald Guerrier – Qarabağ (2017–2019, 2020-2021), Neftçi (2019–2020), Zira (2023)
- Bryan Alceus – Zira (2022)
- Kervens Belfort – Zira (2017)
- Sony Norde – Zira (2019)

=== Honduras ===
- Luis Ramos – AZAL (2014–15)
- Allan Lalín – Khazar Lankaran (2009–11)
- Roger Rojas – Sabah (2019)

=== Jamaica ===
- Deon Burton – Gabala (2010–12)
- Andre Clennon – Keşla (2018–2019)
- Akeem Priestley – Mughan (2009–10)
- **Renaldo Cephas** – **Qarabağ** (2026–)
- **Kaheem Parris** – **Sabah** (2023–2024, 2024–)

=== Mexico ===
- Édgar Pacheco – Sabail (2018)
- Osvaldo Lucas – Standard Baku (2008)

=== Panama ===
- **Roderick Miller** – **Turan Tovuz** (2023-)

=== Saint Martin ===
- Keelan Lebon – Neftçi (2023–2024)

=== Suriname ===
- Dion Malone – Gabala (2017–2018)
- **Denzel Jubitana** – **Neftçi** (2026–)

=== Trinidad and Tobago ===
- Shahdon Winchester – Kapaz (2018)
- Jomal Williams – Zira (2018)

=== United States ===
- Kenny Saief – Neftçi (2022–2023)
- Adan Coronado – AZAL (2016)
- Will John – AZAL (2013–14)

== Notes ==
1. Born in Netherlands Antilles
2. Born in Belgium
3. Born in Brazil
4. Born in the Cameroon
5. Born in the Ivory Coast
6. Born in the England
7. Born in the France
8. Born in the Germany
9. Born in the Israel
10. Born in the Liberia
11. Born in the Morocco
12. Born in the Netherlands
13. Born in the Nigeria
14. Born in Sierra Leone
15. Born in Spain
16. Born in Switzerland
17. Born in Yugoslavia
