= 2006–07 FK Khazar Lankaran season =

Khazar Lankaran
2006-07 season
- President: Mubariz Mansimov
- Manager: Agaselim Mirjavadov
- Stadium: Lankaran City Stadium
- Premier League: 1st
- Azerbaijan Cup: Winners
- Top goalscorer: Zaur Ramazanov (20)
Home colours	Away colours

The Khazar Lankaran 2006–07 season was Khazar Lankaran's second Azerbaijan Premier League season. It was their first season under the management of Agaselim Mirjavadov. They completed a League and Cup double, winning both competitions for the first time.

== Squad ==
No.	Name	Nationality	Position	Date of birth (age)	Signed from	Signed in	Contract ends	Apps.	Goals
Goalkeepers
1	Mikayil Yusifov	(Azerbaijan)	GK	24 April 1982 (aged 25)	MOIK Baku	2005			
13	Dmitry Kramarenko	(Azerbaijan)	GK	12 September 1974 (aged 32)	Terek Grozny	2007			
25	Kamran Agayev	(Azerbaijan)	GK	9 February 1986 (aged 21)	Turan-Tovuz	2006			
Defenders
3	Adehim Niftaliyev	(Azerbaijan)	DF	7 September 1976 (aged 30)	Mes	2004			
4	Valeri Abramidze	(Georgia (country))	DF	17 January 1980 (aged 27)	Neftchi Baku	2006			
5	Emin Quliyev	(Azerbaijan)	DF	12 April 1977 (aged 30)	Neftchi Baku	2005			
6	Fizuli Mammedov	(Azerbaijan)	DF	8 September 1977 (aged 29)	Machine Sazi	2004			
21	Syarhey Pawlyukovich	(Belarus)	DF	19 May 1974 (aged 33)	Dinamo Minsk	2007		8	0
28	Darius Žutautas	(Lithuania)	DF	30 September 1978 (aged 28)	Atlantas	2006		17	0
55	Rodrigo Rosa Sales	(Brazil)	DF	14 February 1984 (aged 23)		2006		8	0
Midfielders
7	Mahmud Qurbanov	(Azerbaijan)	MF	10 May 1973 (aged 34)	Neftchi Baku	2005			
8	Ilgar Gurbanov	(Azerbaijan)	MF	25 April 1986 (aged 21)	Fenerbahçe	2004			
9	Róbert Ilyés	(Romania)	MF	4 February 1974 (aged 33)	Rapid București	2006			
11	Rashad Karimov	(Azerbaijan)	MF	2 April 1986 (aged 21)	Gänclärbirliyi Sumqayit	2005			
14	Rahid Amirguliyev	(Azerbaijan)	MF	1 September 1989 (aged 17)	Shahdag Qusar	2006			
18	Alim Qurbanov	(Azerbaijan)	MF	1 September 1989 (aged 17)	Shamkir	2004			
19	Ceyhun Sultanov	(Azerbaijan)	MF	1 June 1979 (aged 27)	Baku	2007			
27	Rashad Abdullayev	(Azerbaijan)	MF	1 October 1981 (aged 25)	Khazar University	2004			
Forwards
10	Zaur Ramazanov	(Azerbaijan)	FW	27 July 1976 (aged 30)	Karvan	2005			
17	Vüqar Nadirov	(Azerbaijan)	FW	15 June 1987 (aged 19)	Qarabağ	2005			
20	Edmond N'Tiamoah	(Ghana)	FW	1 February 1981 (aged 26)	Luzern	2007			
	Oz	(Brazil)	FW	2 November 1988 (aged 18)		2006			
Left during the season
20	Jorge Díaz Moreno	(Colombia)	FW	1 July 1977 (aged 29)	Cúcuta Deportivo	2006		14	8
21	Mikayıl Namazov	(Azerbaijan)	DF	17 October 1983 (aged 23)	Trainee	2005			
26	Martin Stankov	(Bulgaria)	DF	25 February 1974 (aged 33)	Levski Sofia	2004			
28	Fabio Ricardo	(Brazil)	FW	7 April 1985 (aged 22)		2006			

== Transfers ==
=== Summer ===
In: Note: Flags indicate national team as defined under FIFA eligibility rules; some limited exceptions apply. Players may hold more than one non-FIFA nationality.

No.	Pos.	Nation	Player
4	DF	GEO	Valeri Abramidze (from (Azerbaijan) Neftchi Baku)
14	MF	AZE	Rahid Amirguliyev (from (Azerbaijan) Shahdag)
20	FW	COL	Jorge Díaz Moreno (from (Colombia) Cúcuta Deportivo)
25	GK	AZE	Kamran Agayev (from (Azerbaijan) Turan Tovuz)
—	FW	BRA	Oz (from (Brazil) Santos)

Out: Note: Flags indicate national team as defined under FIFA eligibility rules; some limited exceptions apply. Players may hold more than one non-FIFA nationality.

No.	Pos.	Nation	Player
—	GK	BLR	Alyaksandr Martseshkin
—	GK	SRB	Milorad Korać
—	DF	SRB	Miroslav Savić (to (Azerbaijan) Masallı)
—	DF	ROU	Daniel Munteanu (to (Romania) Unirea Urziceni)
—	MF	AZE	Vüsal Hüseynov (to (Azerbaijan) Olimpik Baku)
—	MF	ROU	Cătălin Liță
—	FW	AZE	Khagani Mammadov (to (Azerbaijan) Olimpik Baku)
—	FW	GHA	Kingsley Atakora
—	FW	SRB	Marinko Petković (to (Serbia) Banat Zrenjanin)

=== Winter ===
In: Note: Flags indicate national team as defined under FIFA eligibility rules; some limited exceptions apply. Players may hold more than one non-FIFA nationality.

No.	Pos.	Nation	Player
1	GK	AZE	Dmitriy Kramarenko (from (Russia) Terek Grozny)
19	MF	AZE	Jeyhun Sultanov (from (Azerbaijan) Baku)
20	FW	GHA	Edmond N'Tiamoah (from (Switzerland) Luzern)
21	DF	BLR	Syarhey Pawlyukovich (from (Belarus) Dinamo Minsk)
28	DF	LTU	Darius Žutautas (from (Lithuania) Atlantas)

Out: Note: Flags indicate national team as defined under FIFA eligibility rules; some limited exceptions apply. Players may hold more than one non-FIFA nationality.

No.	Pos.	Nation	Player
20	FW	COL	Jorge Díaz Moreno (to (Colombia) Junior)
21	DF	AZE	Mikayıl Namazov
26	DF	BUL	Martin Stankov (retired)
28	FW	BRA	Fabio Ricardo

== Competitions ==
=== Azerbaijan Premier League ===
==== Results ====
11 August 2006 2	Khazar Lankaran	2 – 1	Neftchi Baku	Lankaran
	Ramazanov 38' (pen.), 44'	[ Summary]	Petrov 51'	Stadium: Lankaran City Stadium

21 August 2006 3	Simurq	0 – 1	Khazar Lankaran	Zaqatala
		[ Summary]	Ramazanov 85'

26 August 2006 4	Khazar Lankaran	1 – 0	Baku	Lankaran
	Quliyev 45'	[ Summary]		Stadium: Lankaran City Stadium

17 September 2006 5	Olimpik Baku	1 – 2	Khazar Lankaran	Baku
	Mwanza 52'	[ Summary]	Nadirov 32'; I.Gurbanov 36'	Stadium: Shafa Stadium; Attendance: 800

23 September 2006 6	Khazar Lankaran	0 – 0	Turan Tovuz	Lankaran
		[ Summary]		Stadium: Lankaran City Stadium; Attendance: 3,000

29 September 2006 7	Gänclärbirliyi Sumqayit	0 – 3	Khazar Lankaran	Sumqayit
		[ Summary]	I.Gurbanov 8', M.Qurbanov 35' (pen.); Ramazanov 43'	Stadium: Mehdi Huseynzade Stadium; Attendance: 700

22 October 2006 8	Karvan	2 – 1	Khazar Lankaran	Yevlakh
	Bamba 54'; S.Abdullayev 60'	[ Summary]	Ramazanov 11' (pen.)	Stadium: Yevlakh City Stadium; Attendance: 1,000

28 October 2006 9	Khazar Lankaran	0 – 0	Inter Baku	Lankaran
		[ Summary]		Stadium: Lankaran City Stadium; Attendance: 6,720

3 November 2006 10	MKT-Araz	0 – 2	Khazar Lankaran	Imishli
		[ Summary]	Ramazanov 17', 90+1' (pen.)	Stadium: Heydar Aliyev Stadium; Attendance: 2,000

9 November 2006 11	Khazar Lankaran	2 – 0	Qarabağ	Lankaran
	Abdullayev 57', 76'	[ Summary]		Stadium: Lankaran City Stadium; Attendance: 6,500

26 November 2006 12	Şahdağ	1 – 5	Khazar Lankaran	Qusar
	Tijani 47'	[ Summary]	Amirguliev 29', 44'; Ramazanov 57' (pen.), 77'; Moreno 59'	Stadium: Shovkat Ordukhanov Stadium; Attendance: 500

8 December 2006 13	Khazar Lankaran	4 – 0	Gabala	Lankaran
	Abdullayev 17', 67'; Ramazanov 59'; Gurbanov 79'	[ Summary]		Stadium: Lankaran City Stadium; Attendance: 4,500

16 February 2007 15	Neftchi Baku	1 – 0	Khazar Lankaran	Baku
	Boreț 86'	[ Summary]		Stadium: Tofiq Bahramov Stadium; Attendance: 25,000

21 February 2007 16	Khazar Lankaran	1 – 1	Simurq	Lankaran
	Sultanov 87'	[ Summary]	Nasibov 61'	Stadium: Lankaran City Stadium; Attendance: 3,000

17 March 2007 17	Baku	0 – 0	Khazar Lankaran	Baku
		[ Summary]		Stadium: Tofik Bakhramov Stadium; Attendance: 1,500

3 April 2007 20	Khazar Lankaran	3 – 1	Gänclärbirliyi Sumqayit	Lankaran
	Quliyev 12'; Ramazanov 14' (pen.); Amirguliev 73'	[ Summary]	E.Rüstämov 6'	Stadium: Lankaran City Stadium; Attendance: 5,500

8 April 2007 21	Khazar Lankaran	3 – 1	Karvan	Lankaran
	Amirguliev 13'; Nadirov 33'; A.Qurbanov 84'	[ Summary]	Marcos 58'	Stadium: Lankaran City Stadium; Attendance: 11,100

18 April 2007 22	Inter Baku	0 – 0	Khazar Lankaran	Baku
		[ Summary]		Stadium: Shafa Stadium; Attendance: 4,500

27 April 2007 18	Khazar Lankaran	3 – 2	Olimpik Baku	Lankaran
	Quliyev 41', 76'; Ramazanov 45+1' (pen.)	[ Summary]	Mammadov 9'; Fábio 43'	Stadium: Lankaran City Stadium; Attendance: 9,000

2 May 2007 23	Khazar Lankaran	4 – 1	MKT-Araz	Lankaran
	N'Tiamoah 17', 28'; Ramazanov 35', 37'	[ Summary]	Aghakishiyev 82' (pen.)	Stadium: Lankaran City Stadium; Attendance: 10,500

7 May 2007 24	Qarabağ	1 – 4	Khazar Lankaran	Baku
	K.Karimov 25'	[ Summary]	Ramazanov 29', 38'; N'Tiamoah 42', 68'	Stadium: Tofik Bakhramov Stadium^{2} Attendance: 2,000

12 May 2007 19	Turan Tovuz	2 – 3	Khazar Lankaran	Tovuz
	Aliyev 55'; Igbekoi 58'	[ Summary]	Ramazanov 17', 28', 46'	Stadium: Tovuz City Stadium; Attendance: 2,000

17 May 2007 25	Khazar Lankaran	3 – 1	Şahdağ	Lankaran
	Sultanov 8', 67'; Amirguliev 55'	[ Summary]	S.Sadiqov 40'	Stadium: Lankaran City Stadium; Attendance: 6,000

22 May 2007 26	Gabala	0 – 3	Khazar Lankaran	Qabala
		[ Summary]	Quliyev 5'; Abdullayev 22'; Ramazanov 41'	Stadium: Gabala City Stadium; Attendance: 1,000

==== Table ====
Pos	Team	Pld	W	D	L	GF	GA	GD	Pts	Qualification or relegation
1	Khazar Lankaran (C)	24	17	5	2	50	16	+34	56	Qualification for Champions League first qualifying round
2	Neftçi Baku	24	17	3	4	47	15	+32	54	Qualification for UEFA Cup first qualifying round (Note: MKT-Araz qualified for the first qualifying round of the 2005–06 UEFA Cup as winner of the 2004–05 Azerbaijan Cup.)
3	Baku	24	14	6	4	25	10	+15	48	Qualification for Intertoto Cup first round
4	Inter Baku	24	13	6	5	36	12	+24	45	
5	FK MKT-Araz	24	12	5	7	23	18	+5	41	Qualification for UEFA Cup first qualifying round

Source: Azerbaijan Professional Football league
(C) Champions

=== Azerbaijan Cup ===
11 September 2006 1st Round 1st Leg	Khazar Lankaran	9 – 0	Goyca Baku	Lankaran
	Ilyés 12'; M.Qurbanov 38', 51'; Abdullayev 47'; Moreno 49', 66', 73', 88'; Nadirov 75'	[ Summary]		Stadium: Lankaran City Stadium

17 October 2006 1st Round 2nd Leg	Goyca Baku	1 – 3 (1 – 12 agg.)	Khazar Lankaran	Baku
	Goal	[ Summary]	Ilyés

20 November 2006 Round of 16 1st Leg	Khazar Lankaran	4 – 0	Bakılı	Lankaran
	Amirguliev 31'; Moreno 33'; Nadirov 88', 90+2'	[ Summary]		Stadium: Lankaran City Stadium; Attendance: 3,500

2 December 2006 Round of 16 2nd Leg	Bakılı	0 – 3 (0 – 7 agg.)	Khazar Lankaran	Baku
		[ Summary]	Nadirov 32'; Moreno 60'; A.Mammadvaliyev 90+2' (o.g.)	Stadium: Shafa Stadium

26 February 2007 Quarterfinals 1st Leg	Baku	0 – 2	Khazar Lankaran	Baku
AZT (UTC+4)		[ Summary]	Amirguliyev 57'; F.Mammedov 90'	Stadium: Tofig Bakhramov Stadium

4 March 2007 Quarterfinals 2nd Leg	Khazar Lankaran	0 – 1 (2 – 1 agg.)	Baku	Lankaran
AZT (UTC+4)		[ Summary]	Pérez 64'	Stadium: Lankaran City Stadium

13 April 2007 Semifinals 1st Leg	Inter Baku	0 – 1	Khazar Lankaran	Baku
AZST (UTC+5)		[ Summary]	Abdullayev 51'	Stadium: Shafa Stadium; Attendance: 3,500

22 April 2007 Semifinals 2nd Leg	Khazar Lankaran	1 – 0 (2 – 0 agg.)	Inter Baku	Lankaran
AZST (UTC+5)	Quliyev 18' (pen.)	[ Summary]		Stadium: Lankaran City Stadium; Attendance: 11,000

==== Final ====
27 May 2007	Khazar Lankaran	1 – 0	MKT Araz	Baku
AZST (UTC+5)	Karimov 90'	[ Summary]		Stadium: Tofiq Bahramov Stadium; Attendance: 15,500

== Squad statistics ==
=== Appearances and goals ===
No.	Pos	Nat	Player	Total		Premier League		Azerbaijan Cup	
No.	Pos	Nat	Player	Apps	Goals	Apps	Goals	Apps	Goals
1	GK	(Azerbaijan) AZE	Mikayil Yusifov	6	0	6	0	0	0
3	DF	(Azerbaijan) AZE	Adehim Niftaliyev	26	0	17	0	9	0
4	DF	(Georgia (country)) GEO	Valeri Abramidze	27	0	21	0	6	0
5	DF	(Azerbaijan) AZE	Emin Quliyev	21	6	21	5		
6	DF	(Azerbaijan) AZE	Fizuli Mammedov	11	1	11	0		
7	MF	(Azerbaijan) AZE	Mahmud Qurbanov	32	3	24	1	8	2
8	MF	(Azerbaijan) AZE	Ilgar Gurbanov	20	3	20	3		
9	MF	(Romania) ROU	Róbert Ilyés	17	3	13	0	4	3
10	FW	(Azerbaijan) AZE	Zaur Ramazanov	24	20	24	20		
11	MF	(Azerbaijan) AZE	Rashad Karimov	9	1	9	0		
13	GK	(Azerbaijan) AZE	Dmitriy Kramarenko	5	0	5	0		
14	MF	(Azerbaijan) AZE	Rahid Amirguliev	17	7	17	5		
17	FW	(Azerbaijan) AZE	Vüqar Nadirov	22	6	22	2		
18	MF	(Azerbaijan) AZE	Alim Gurbanov	19	1	19	1		
19	MF	(Azerbaijan) AZE	Jeyhun Sultanov	11	3	11	3		
20	FW	(Ghana) GHA	Edmond N'Tiamoah	9	4	9	4		
21	DF	(Belarus) BLR	Syarhey Pawlyukovich	8	0	5	0	3	0
25	GK	(Azerbaijan) AZE	Kamran Agayev	14	0	14	0		
27	MF	(Azerbaijan) AZE	Rashad Abdullayev	23	6	23	4		
28	DF	(Lithuania) LTU	Darius Žutautas	17	0	12	0	5	0
55	DF	(Brazil) BRA	Rodriqo Sales Rosa	8	0	4	0	4	0
Players who appeared for Khazar Lankaran who left during the season:
20	FW	(Colombia) COL	Jorge Díaz Moreno	14	8	10	2	4	6
21	DF	(Azerbaijan) AZE	Mikayıl Namazov	4	0	4	0		
26	DF	(Bulgaria) BUL	Martin Stankov	11	0	11	0		

=== Goal scorers ===
Place	Position	Nation	Number	Name	Premier League	Azerbaijan Cup	Total
1	FW	(Azerbaijan)	10	Zaur Ramazanov	20	0	20
2	FW	(Colombia)	20	Jorge Díaz Moreno	2	6	8
3	MF	(Azerbaijan)	14	Rahid Amirguliev	5	2	7
4	MF	(Azerbaijan)	5	Emin Quliyev	5	1	6
4	MF	(Azerbaijan)	27	Rashad Abdullayev	4	2	6
4	FW	(Azerbaijan)	17	Vüqar Nadirov	2	4	6
8	FW	(Ghana)	20	Edmond N'Tiamoah	4	0	4
9	MF	(Azerbaijan)	8	Ilgar Gurbanov	3	0	3
9	MF	(Azerbaijan)	19	Jeyhun Sultanov	3	0	3
9	MF	(Romania)	9	Róbert Ilyés	0	3	3
12	MF	(Azerbaijan)	7	Mahmud Qurbanov	0	2	2
13	MF	(Azerbaijan)	18	Alim Qurbanov	1	0	1
13	MF	(Azerbaijan)	7	Mahmud Qurbanov	1	0	1
13	DF	(Azerbaijan)	6	Fizuli Mammedov	0	1	1
13	MF	(Azerbaijan)	11	Rashad Karimov	0	1	1
13				Own goal	0	1	1
				Unknown	0	1	1
				TOTALS	50	24	74

== Notes ==
- Qarabağ have played their home games at the Tofiq Bahramov Stadium since 1993 due to the ongoing situation in Quzanlı.
