= Bakhtin =

Bakhtin (Russian: Бахтин) is a Russian masculine surname originating from the obsolete verb bakhtet (бахтеть), meaning to swagger; its feminine counterpart is Bakhtina. The surname may refer to the following notable people:

- Aleksandr Bakhtin (born 1971), Russian football player
- Igor Bakhtin (born 1973), Russian football coach and player
- Ivan Bakhtin (1756–1818), Russian government official and writer
- Mikhail Bakhtin (1895–1975), Russian philosopher, literary critic and scholar
- Svetlana Bakhtina (born 1980), Russian gymnast
