= Adriano da Silva =

Adriano da Silva may refer to:

- Adriano Peixe, Brazilian footballer, full name Adriano da Silva
- Adriano Júnior, Brazilian footballer, full name Adriano da Silva Barros Junior
- Adriano da Silva (sailor), Portuguese sailor
