= Andrei Sveshnikov =

Russian footballer

Personal information
- Full name: Andrei Gennadyevich Sveshnikov
- Date of birth: 22 March 1979 (age 47)
- Place of birth: Moscow, Russian SFSR
- Height: 1.80 m (5 ft 11 in)
- Positions: Defender; midfielder

Youth career
- PFC CSKA Moscow

Senior career*
Years	Team	Apps	(Gls)
1999	FC Kolomna	30	(2)
2000	FC Saturn Ramenskoye	1	(0)
2000	→ FC Saturn-d Ramenskoye (loan)	29	(0)
2001	FC Oryol	13	(2)
2002	FC Vidnoye (amateur)		
2003	FC Vidnoye	33	(6)
2004	FC Oka Stupino (amateur)		
2004–2005	FK Gandja	12	(0)
- * Club domestic league appearances and goals

Andrei Gennadyevich Sveshnikov (Russian: Андрей Геннадьевич Свешников; born 22 March 1979 in Moscow) is a former Russian football player.
