= Aleksandar Kocić =

Serbian footballer

Personal information
- Full name: Aleksandar Kocić
- Date of birth: 18 March 1969 (age 57)
- Place of birth: Vlasotince, SR Serbia, Yugoslavia
- Height: 1.91 m (6 ft 3 in)
- Position: Goalkeeper

Youth career
- Vlasina

Senior career*
Years	Team	Apps	(Gls)
1987–1989	Vlasina	57	(0)
1989–1990	Dubočica	30	(0)
1990–1996	Vojvodina	107	(0)
1996–1998	Perugia	21	(0)
1997	→ Levante (loan)	7	(0)
1997–1998	→ Empoli (loan)	2	(0)
1998–2001	Red Star Belgrade	75	(0)
2002–2006	Ethnikos Achna	102	(0)
Total		401	(0)

International career
1994–2001	FR Yugoslavia	22	(0)

Managerial career
- 2009–2010: Srem
- 2011–2012: ČSK Čelarevo
- * Club domestic league appearances and goals

Aleksandar Kocić (Serbian Cyrillic: Александар Коцић; born 18 March 1969) is a Serbian former football goalkeeper.

== Playing career ==
=== Club career ===
Kocić played in many teams such as Vlasina, Dubočica, Vojvodina, Perugia, Levante, Empoli, Red Star Belgrade and Ethnikos Achna.

=== International career ===
Kocić was capped 22 times with the FR Yugoslavia national team. He was set to be a participant at UEFA Euro 2000 but broke a toe while showering after the last practice prior to the tournament. His replacement was FK Obilić goalkeeper Milorad Korać. His final international was a March 2001 World Cup qualification match away against Slovenia.

== Coaching career ==
Kocić coached Srem from 2009 to 2010 and ČSK Čelarevo from 2011 to 2012.

=== Serbia national football team ===
Kocić served as the goalkeeping coach of the Serbia national team from 2012 to 2015, having worked with Siniša Mihajlović (19 matches), Radovan Ćurčić (9 matches), Dick Advocaat (4 matches) and Ljubinko Drulović (4 matches).

=== Tianjin TEDA ===
As Dragan Okuka became the head coach of Tianjin TEDA in 2016, Kocić was invited to join his coaching team as a goalkeeper coach. They showed up together in the welcome ceremony held by the club. Unfortunately, the staff left Tianjin TEDA after 22 matches that didn't satisfy the club.

=== Changchun Yatai ===
When Lee Jang-soo began his second season in Changchun as the head coach, Changchun Yatai hired Kocić as the goalkeeper coach. His predecessor was Yang Jingdong, who is now the vice president of Changchun Yatai.
