= Omar El-Zein =

Lebanese-born German footballer

Personal information
- Date of birth: 12 August 1985 (age 41)
- Place of birth: Lebanon
- Position: Forward

Senior career*
Years	Team	Apps	(Gls)
- SV Südharz Walkenried
2007/2008	VfB Germania Halberstadt	5	(1)
-2009	FC Dostluk Spor Osterode		
2009/2010	FK Standard Sumgayit	4	(1)
2009/2010	SVG Göttingen 07		
- SV Südharz Walkenried
2013-2014	FSV Wacker 90 Nordhausen	18	(6)
2014/2015	BSV Schwarz-Weiß Rehden	15	(2)
2014/2015	KFC Uerdingen 05	15	(2)
2015/2016	VfV 06 Hildesheim	5	(1)
- VfR Dostluk Osterode
- * Club domestic league appearances and goals

Omar El-Zein (born 12 August 1985 in Lebanon) is a German footballer.

== Career ==
After spending half a season with his first few clubs and scoring 65 goals in one season with amateurs Dostluk Spor Osterode, El-Zein decided to play professionally in Azerbaijan with FK Standard Sumgayit. However, he left after making 4 appearances and one goal due to a change in head coach, who only used local players. In 2010, El-Zein claimed that he regretted that move and that "it [Azerbaijan] was a waste of time".

In 2013, he signed for FSV Wacker 90 Nordhausen in the German Regionalliga, scoring 6 goals in 18 league appearances before playing for 3 more Regionalliga sides.

As a freestyler, El-Zein was nicknamed "Omardinho" after Brazilian international Ronaldinho and once came 2nd in a nationwide freestyle competition.
