= Denys Sokolovskyi =

Ukrainian footballer

Personal information
- Full name: Denys Mykhaylovych Sokolovskyi
- Date of birth: 26 March 1979 (age 47)
- Place of birth: Donetsk, Ukrainian SSR
- Height: 1.76 m (5 ft 9 in)
- Position: Striker

Senior career*
Years	Team	Apps	(Gls)
1996	Shakhtar Makiivka	3	(0)
1997–1999	Metalurh Donetsk	25	(2)
1997–1998	→ Metalurh-2 Donetsk	26	(5)
1999	→ Mashynobudivnyk Druzhkivka (loan)	1	(0)
2000	Panionios	16	(2)
2001	KP Police		
2002	Pogoń Szczecin	5	(0)
2002–2003	Vorskla Poltava	12	(1)
2002–2003	→ Vorskla-2 Poltava	5	(0)
2003	Obolon Kyiv	4	(0)
2003	→ Obolon-2 Kyiv	2	(0)
2004	Zirka Kirovohrad	5	(0)
2004	→ Olimpiya Yuzhnoukrainsk (loan)	2	(0)
2004	Kryvbas Kryvyi Rih	4	(0)
2005–2006	Qarabağ	29	(4)
2006	Spartak Sumy	5	(2)
2006–2007	Krymteplitsia Molodizhne	23	(1)
2008–2009	Tytan Donetsk	30	(7)
2009–2010	Slovkhlib Slovyansk		
- * Club domestic league appearances and goals

Denys Mykhaylovych Sokolovskyi (born 26 March 1979) is a Ukrainian former professional footballer who played as a striker for several clubs in Europe, including Metalurh Donetsk and Vorskla Poltava in the Ukrainian Premier League, Panionios in the Super League Greece and Pogoń Szczecin in the Polish Ekstraklasa.

Sokolovskyi had brief stints with clubs in Greece and Poland before returning to Ukraine with Vorskla Poltava for the 2002 season.

== Personal life ==
His father Mykhaylo Sokolovskyi is a Shakhtar Donetsk legend.
