= Merab Dzodzuashvili =

Georgian footballer

Personal information
- Date of birth: 4 November 1980 (age 45)
- Height: 1.83 m (6 ft 0 in)
- Position: Midfielder

Senior career*
Years	Team	Apps	(Gls)
1998	FC Lokomotivi Tbilisi	1	(1)
1999	FC Guria Lanchkhuti	12	(0)
1999	FC Samgurali Tskaltubo	14	(3)
2000–2002	FC Lokomotivi Tbilisi	18	(2)
2003–2004	FC Dila Gori	42	(9)
2004	FC Kolkheti-1913 Poti	18	(5)
2005	FK Baku	3	(2)
2005–2006	FC Torpedo Kutaisi	17	(3)

International career
2000	Georgia	2	(0)
- * Club domestic league appearances and goals

Merab Dzodzuashvili (born 4 November 1980) is a Georgian football player who is currently playing for Greek club Asteria Drapetsona.
