= Aleksandr Bakhtin =

Russian footballer

Personal information
- Full name: Aleksandr Viktorovich Bakhtin
- Date of birth: 20 January 1971 (age 55)
- Place of birth: Moscow, Russian SFSR
- Height: 1.77 m (5 ft 9 1/2 in)
- Position: Midfielder

Youth career
- FC Torpedo Moscow

Senior career*
Years	Team	Apps	(Gls)
1994	Kaukosen Pallo-85		
1995	FC Monolit Moscow	15	(5)
1995	FC Okean Nakhodka	18	(3)
1996	FC Chernomorets Novorossiysk	9	(0)
1996	→ FC Chernomorets-d Novorossiysk (loan)	4	(0)
1997–1999	FC Avtomobilist Noginsk	99	(4)
2000	FC Metallurg Novokuznetsk	25	(3)
2001	FC Terek Grozny	19	(0)
2001–2002	Qarabağ-Azersun FK	17	(2)
2002	FC Metallurg Vidnoye		
2002	FC Vidnoye (amateur)		
2003	FC Vidnoye	8	(0)
2014	FC Vidnoye (amateur)		
- * Club domestic league appearances and goals

Aleksandr Viktorovich Bakhtin (Russian: Александр Викторович Бахтин; born 20 January 1971) is a former Russian football player.

== Honours ==
Qarabağ-Azersun

- Azerbaijan Premier League bronze: 2001–02
