= Mikayil Yusifov =

Azerbaijani footballer (born 1982)

Personal information
- Date of birth: 24 April 1982 (age 44)
- Place of birth: Baku, Azerbaijani SSR, Soviet Union
- Height: 1.85 m (6 ft 1 in)
- Position: Goalkeeper

Youth career
- Shafa Baku

Senior career*
Years	Team	Apps	(Gls)
1998–2004	Shafa Baku	35	(0)
2004–2005	MOIK Baku	28	(0)
2005–2007	Khazar Lankaran	17	(0)
2007–2008	Kartalspor	3	(0)
2008	Standard Baku	0	(0)
2009–2012	Mughan		
2012–2013	Turan-Tovuz	2	(0)

International career^{‡}
2005	Azerbaijan	1	(0)
- * Club domestic league appearances and goals as of 20 March 2020 ‡ National team caps and goals as of 20 March 2020

Mikayil Yusifov (born 24 April 1982) is a retired Azerbaijani professional football goalkeeper.

== Career ==
Yusifov joined FK Khazar Lenkoran from MOIK Baku before the 2005–06 season. He later transferred to Kartalspor in Turkey before the 2007–08 season. His contract with Kartalspor was cancelled by mutual agreement on 15 August 2008. Shortly after he was presented as the new goalkeeper for Standard Baku.

Yusifov made his debut with the Azerbaijan national football team as a second-half substitute in a friendly against T&T on 23 February 2005.
