= Ivan Bakhtin =

Russian writer and politician (1756–1818)

- Born: Ivan Ivanovich Bakhtin; 1756; Tula, Russian Empire
- Died: April 26, 1818 (aged 62); Saint Petersburg, Russian Empire
- Occupations: Writer, politician
- Writing career
- Genres: Poems, madrigals, epigrams, parables, fairy tales
- Subject: Satire

Ivan Ivanovich Bakhtin (Russian: Иван Иванович Бахтин; 1756 – April 26, 1818), was a Russian government official and writer.

== Biography ==
Bakhtin was born in Tula, Russian Empire, to an old family of the nobility. He enlisted in the Russian army in 1772, and was a part of the Russo-Turkish War, he retired from the military in 1776 as a Podporuchik of artillery.

In 1802, he jointed the Ministry of Finance, and on numerous occasions Alexander I had given him confidential assignments on misconduct of government administration and officials. On April 8, 1803, he was promoted to a state councilor and appointed the governor of the Kharkov Governorate. He directly contributed to the opening of the Kharkov University. Bakhtin retired in 1814, and moved to St. Petersburg, Russia, in 1815. He died on April 26, 1818, and was buried in the Volkovo Cemetery.

== Literature ==
Satire was the main element of Bakhtin's literary works, as well as poems, madrigals, epigrams, parables and fairy tales. His literary works and contributions were included in:

- "Бахтин, Иван Иванович". Brockhaus and Efron Encyclopedic Dictionary: In 86 Volumes (82 Volumes and 4 Additional Volumes) (in Russian). St. Petersburg: F. A. Brockhaus. 1890–1907.
- Russian Biographical Dictionary, 1896–1918.
- Kochetkova N. D. Bakhtin I.I. // Dictionary of Russian writers of the 18th century (Russian: Словарь русских писателей XVIII века), 1988, chapter 1, p. 70-72.
- Chmykhalo B. A. The experience of reconstructing one's biography (Poet and government official I. I. Bakhtin) (Russian: Опыт реконструкции одной биографии (Поэт и чиновник И. И. Бахтин)) // Tendency of development of the Russian literature in Siberia in 18–20th centuries (Russian: Тенденции развития русской литературы в Сибири в XVIII—XX вв.), Novosibirsk, 1985.
