= Rashad Karimov =

Azerbaijani footballer (born 1986)

Personal information
- Date of birth: 2 April 1986 (age 40)
- Place of birth: Azerbaijani SSR, Soviet Union
- Height: 1.74 m (5 ft 9 in)
- Position: Midfielder

Senior career*
Years	Team	Apps	(Gls)
2003–04	Khazar Sumgayit	11	(2)
2004	Gänclärbirliyi Sumqayit	15	(1)
2005–08	Khazar Lankaran	24	(0)
2008–10	Karvan	8	(1)
2010–11	Qarabag	21	(1)
2011–12	Sumgayit	2	(0)

International career^{‡}
2007–	Azerbaijan	1	(0)
- * Club domestic league appearances and goals as of 2 October 2013 ‡ National team caps and goals as of 2 October 2013

Rashad Karimov (born 2 April 1986) is an Azerbaijani footballer who last played for Sumgayit in the Azerbaijan Premier League.

Karimov scored the winning goal for Khazar Lankaran in the 2006–07 Azerbaijan Cup final against MKT Araz, netting in the 90th minute.

== Career statistics ==
As of 2 October 2013

Club performance			League		Cup		Continental		Total	
Season	Club	League	Apps	Goals	Apps	Goals	Apps	Goals	Apps	Goals
Azerbaijan			League		Azerbaijan Cup		Europe		Total	
2003–04	Khazar Sumgayit	Azerbaijan Premier League	11	2			—		11	2
2004–05	Gänclärbirliyi Sumqayit	Azerbaijan Premier League	15	1			—		15	1
2004–05	Khazar Lankaran	Azerbaijan Premier League	7	0			—		7	0
2005–06	Khazar Lankaran	Azerbaijan Premier League	3	0			—		3	0
2006–07	Khazar Lankaran	Azerbaijan Premier League	9	0			—		9	0
2007–08	Khazar Lankaran	Azerbaijan Premier League	5	0			—		5	0
2008–09	FK Karvan	Azerbaijan Premier League	8	1			—		24	0
2009–10	FK Karvan	Azerbaijan Premier League	0	0			—		0	0
2009–10	Qarabağ	Azerbaijan Premier League	11	1	0	0	—		11	1
2010–11	Qarabağ	Azerbaijan Premier League	10	0			—		10	0
2011–12	Sumgayit	Azerbaijan Premier League	2	0	0	0	—		19	1
Total	Azerbaijan		81	5			0	0	81	5
Career total			81	5			0	0	81	5

== Honours ==
Inter Baku

- Azerbaijan Premier League
  - Winner (1): 2006–07
- Azerbaijan Cup
  - Winner (2): 2006–07, 2007–08
