= Gocha Trapaidze =

Georgian footballer

Personal information
- Date of birth: 9 May 1976 (age 50)
- Place of birth: Soviet Union
- Height: 1.73 m (5 ft 8 in)
- Position: Midfielder

Team information
- Current team: FK Karvan
- Number: 16

Senior career*
Years	Team	Apps	(Gls)
- FC Kolkheti Poti
- FC Karvina
- FC Sioni Bolnisi
- FC Dinamo Tbilisi
2000–2003	SC Tavriya Simferopol	62	(7)
2003	FC Ihroservice Simferopol	1	(0)
2003	FC Enerhetyk Burshtyn	11	(3)
2004	FC Volyn Lutsk	4	(0)
2004	Ikva Mlyniv	1	(0)
2004–2008	FK Karvan		
- * Club domestic league appearances and goals as of 15 July 2007 ‡ National team caps and goals as of 15 July 2007

Gocha Trapaidze (Georgian: გოჩა ტრაპაიძე; born 9 May 1976) is a Georgian footballer currently playing for Yuksak Liqa club FK Karvan as a midfielder.
