= Adriano Peixe =

Brazilian footballer (born 1980)

Personal information
- Full name: Adriano da Silva
- Date of birth: 2 May 1980 (age 46)
- Place of birth: Maringá, Brazil
- Height: 1.74 m (5 ft 9 in)
- Position: Defender

Senior career*
Years	Team	Apps	(Gls)
2004–2005	Mirassol		(0)
2005–2007	América of Parnamirim	14	(0)
2007	→ América-SP (loan)		
2008	América-SP		
2008	→ Gama (loan)		
2008–2009	→ Standard Sumgayit (loan)	4	(0)
2009	→ Ferroviaria (loan)		
2010	Sorocaba		
2010–2011	Goianésia		
2012	Santacruzense		
2012	Maringá		
2015	Colorado		
2015	Assisense		
- * Club domestic league appearances and goals

Adriano da Silva (born 2 May 1980), known as Adriano Peixe, is a Brazilian former professional footballer who played as a defender.

In February 2009, he joined Standard Sumgayit in the Azerbaijan Premier League on loan.
