= Jorge Díaz (footballer, born 1977) =

Colombian footballer

Personal information
- Full name: Jorge Díaz Moreno
- Date of birth: 1 July 1977 (age 49)
- Place of birth: Cali, Colombia
- Height: 1.74 m (5 ft 9 in)
- Position: Forward

Youth career
- –1996: Deportivo Cali

Senior career*
Years	Team	Apps	(Gls)
1996–1998	Deportivo Cali	100	
1999	Deportes Quindío		
2000	Deportivo Cali		
2000	LDU Quito		
2001–2002	Once Caldas		
2003–2004	Deportivo Cali		
2004	Deportivo Pereira		
2005	Millonarios		
2005	Atlético Huila		
2006	Cúcuta Deportivo		
2006	Khazar Lankaran		
2007–2009	Junior		
2009	Atlético Huila		
- * Club domestic league appearances and goals as of 2 October 2013 ‡ National team caps and goals as of 2 October 2013

Jorge Díaz Moreno (born 1 July 1977) is a retired Colombian footballer who played as a forward. During his career Díaz Moreno played in Ecuador and Azerbaijan, as well as his native Colombia.

== Career statistics ==
Appearances and goals by club, season and competition
Club	Season	League			National cup (Note: Includes Azerbaijan Cup.)		Continental		Total	
Club	Season	Division	Apps	Goals	Apps	Goals	Apps	Goals	Apps	Goals
Khazar Lankaran	2006–07	Azerbaijan Premier League	10	2	4	6	—		14	8
Career total			10	2	4	6	0	0	14	8

== Honours ==
Junior

- Categoría Primera A runner-up: 2009
