= Martin Stankov =

Bulgarian footballer

Personal information
- Full name: Martin Stankov
- Date of birth: 25 February 1974 (age 52)
- Place of birth: Vidin, Bulgaria
- Height: 1.80 m (5 ft 11 in)
- Position: Right-back

Youth career
- Etar Veliko Tarnovo

Senior career*
Years	Team	Apps	(Gls)
1997–1998	Slavia Sofia	37	(0)
1998–2002	Levski Sofia	59	(1)
2002–2003	Malatyaspor	17	(0)
2003–2004	Levski Sofia	19	(0)
2004–2007	Khazar Lenkoran	48	(1)

International career
2003	Bulgaria	2	(0)
- * Club domestic league appearances and goals

Martin Stankov (Bulgarian: Мартин Станков; born 25 February 1974) is a former Bulgarian professional footballer who played as a defender. He gained 2 caps for the Bulgaria national team.

At club level, Stankov played for Slavia Sofia, Levski Sofia, Malatyaspor and Khazar Lenkoran.
