= Marinko Petković =

Serbian footballer

Personal information
- Full name: Marinko Petković
- Date of birth: 17 September 1976 (age 50)
- Place of birth: Bačka Palanka, SFR Yugoslavia
- Height: 1.89 m (6 ft 2 in)
- Position: Striker

Youth career
- OFK Bačka
- Red Star Belgrade

Senior career*
| Years | Team | Apps | (Gls) |
| 1998–1999 | ČSK Čelarevo | | |
| 2001–2003 | Čukarički | 49 | (17) |
| 2003–2006 | Budućnost Banatski Dvor | 50 | (12) |
| 2005 | Khazar Lankaran | 3 | (1) |
| 2006–2009 | Banat Zrenjanin | 57 | (2) |
| 2009–2010 | ČSK Čelarevo | 14 | (0) |
| Total | | 173 | (32) |
- * Club domestic league appearances and goals

Marinko Petković (Serbian Cyrillic: Маринко Петковић; born 17 September 1976) is a Serbian retired footballer who played as a striker.

== Honours ==
Budućnost Banatski Dvor

- Serbia and Montenegro Cup: Runner-up 2003–04
