= Milorad Korać =

Serbian footballer

Personal information
- Full name: Milorad Korać
- Date of birth: 10 March 1969 (age 57)
- Place of birth: Požega, SFR Yugoslavia
- Height: 1.84 m (6 ft 1/2 in)
- Position: Goalkeeper

Senior career*
Years	Team	Apps	(Gls)
1988–1994	Sloboda Užice	141	(0)
1994–1998	Bečej	108	(0)
1998–2000	Obilić	34	(0)
2000–2002	Erzurumspor	52	(0)
2002–2003	Kocaelispor	12	(0)
2003–2004	Hajduk Beograd	24	(0)
2004–2006	Xäzär Länkäran	10	(0)
Total		381	(0)
- * Club domestic league appearances and goals

Milorad Korać (Serbian Cyrillic: Милорад Кораћ; born 10 March 1969) is a Serbian football goalkeeping manager and former player (goalkeeper).

== Playing career ==
=== Club career ===
Korać played for several clubs, including Sloboda Užice, Bečej, Obilić, Erzurumspor and Kocaelispor in Turkey and FK Hajduk Beograd. He spent his last two seasons as goalkeeper of Khazar Lankaran from Azerbaijan.

=== International career ===
He has one unofficial cap for the FR Yugoslavia national football team and was a participant at the 2000 UEFA European Championship. He was a last-minute call-up replacing Aleksandar Kocić who broke a toe while showering after the last practice prior to the tournament.

== Coaching career ==
He was a goalkeeper coach for Panserraikos F.C. while they were in the Super League Greece.
