= Osmar Sigueira =

Brazilian footballer

Personal information
- Full name: Osmar Sigueira Rodrigues
- Date of birth: November 2, 1988 (age 38)
- Place of birth: Diadema, São Paulo, Brazil
- Height: 1.69 m (5 ft 7 in)
- Position: Striker

Senior career*
Years	Team	Apps	(Gls)
2006?–2007	FK Khazar Lenkoran	?	(?)
2007–2008?	FK Masallı	?	(?)
2008?–2009?	Standard Baku		
2009?	Brazil club?		
2009–2010?	Standard Sumgayit		
- * Club domestic league appearances and goals

Osmar Sigueira Rodrigues (born 2 November 1988 in Diadema, São Paulo) is a Brazilian footballer who has played for a number of teams in Azerbaijan.

== Career ==
He used to play with Khazar Lankaran, leaving them to join Masalli in June 2007.

Sigueira played for Standard (Baku) in the 2008–09 Azerbaijan Premier League, including matches in October 2008 and April 2009.

He transferred to play for FC Standard from Brazil in November 2009.

=== Career statistics ===
Appearances and goals by club, season and competition
Club	Season	League			National Cup		Continental		Total	
Club	Division	Apps	Goals	Apps	Goals	Apps	Goals	Apps	Goals	
Masallı	2007–08	Azerbaijan Premier League	15	6			–		15	6
Standard (Bakı)	2008–09	Azerbaijan Premier League	9	0			–		9	0
Standard (Sumqayıt)	2009–10	Azerbaijan Premier League	0	0			–		0	0
