= Syarhey Pawlyukovich =

Belarusian footballer (born 1974)

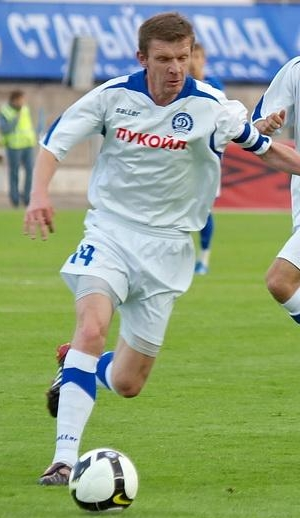
- Pawlyukovich with Dinamo Minsk

Personal information
- Full name: Syarhey Vasilevich Pawlyukovich
- Date of birth: 19 May 1974 (age 52)
- Place of birth: Minsk, Belarusian SSR
- Height: 1.89 m (6 ft 2 in)
- Position: Defender

Youth career
- Smena Minsk

Senior career*
Years	Team	Apps	(Gls)
1992	SKIF-RShVSM Minsk	13	(4)
1992–1993	Smena Minsk	24	(5)
1993–1998	Torpedo Minsk	123	(14)
1999–2002	Amkar Perm	99	(5)
2003	Tom Tomsk	13	(0)
2004–2006	Dinamo Minsk	73	(6)
2007	Khazar Lankaran	5	(0)
2007–2009	Dinamo Minsk	51	(1)

International career
1995	Belarus U21	2	(0)

Managerial career
- 2010–2011: Dinamo Minsk (reserves)
- 2011–2013: Dinamo Minsk (assistant)
- 2013–2015: Dinamo Minsk (director of football)
- 2015–2016: Energetik-BGU (assistant)
- 2016: Krumkachy Minsk (assistant)
- 2018–2019: Torpedo Minsk (assistant)
- 2019–2020: Belarus U21 (assistant)
- 2020: Vitebsk (assistant)
- 2021–2022: Isloch Minsk Raion (assistant)
- 2023: Arsenal Dzerzhinsk
- * Club domestic league appearances and goals

Syarhey Pawlyukovich (Belarusian: Сяргей Паўлюковіч; Russian: Серге́й Павлюкович; born 19 May 1974) is a Belarusian professional football coach and former player who played as a defender.

== Biography ==
A graduate of the Minsk football school "Smena", his first coach was A. V. Sidorovich. He began his career as a midfielder in "Smena", He played 5 seasons in Minsk " Torpedo ". He had a good scoring record for a defender . In 1995, he played two matches for the youth team of Belarus .

In 1999, he went to Russia to play for Perm's Amkar . There, he played more than 100 matches, after which, in 2003, he became a player for Tom, and a year later, he moved to Minsk's Dynamo . After spending 3 seasons in the club (he played almost all of his matches for the reserve team in the third season), he went to Azerbaijan's Khazar -Lenkoran, where he won the championship and the Azerbaijan Cup .

- In 2007 he returned to Dynamo Minsk, and in 2008 he became the team captain.
- In 2009, he played his farewell match for Dynamo against Dnepr Mogilev.
- In 2010, he moved to coaching at Dynamo Minsk.
- In 2016, he was part of Oleg Dulub's coaching staff.

== Honours ==
Dinamo Minsk

- Belarusian Premier League: 2004

Khazar Lankaran

- Azerbaijan Premier League: 2006–07
- Azerbaijan Cup: 2006–07
