= Aleksandr Martyoshkin =

Belarusian footballer

Personal information
- Full name: Aleksandr Aleksandrovich Martyoshkin
- Date of birth: 29 June 1970 (age 56)
- Place of birth: Minsk, Belarusian SSR, Soviet Union
- Height: 1.94 m (6 ft 4 1/2 in)
- Position: Goalkeeper

Team information
- Current team: Dinamo Minsk (reserves GK coach)

Youth career
- SDYuShOR-5 Minsk

Senior career*
Years	Team	Apps	(Gls)
1991	Orbita Minsk		
1992–1993	Shakhtyor Soligorsk	56	(0)
1994–1996	Krylia Sovetov Samara	37	(0)
1997	Energiya Kamyshin	11	(0)
1997	KAMAZ-Chally Naberezhnye Chelny	12	(0)
1998–1999	Kristall Smolensk	67	(0)
2000–2003	Shakhtyor Soligorsk	111	(0)
2004	Dinamo Minsk	8	(0)
2004	→ Darida Minsk Raion (loan)	2	(0)
2004–2006	Khazar Lankaran	39	(0)
2010	Veras Nesvizh	5	(0)
2011	Klechesk Kletsk	3	(0)
2014	Bereza-2010	0	(0)

Managerial career
- 2011–2012: Torpedo-BelAZ Zhodino (GK coach)
- 2012: Torpedo-BelAZ Zhodino (caretaker)
- 2012–2015: Dinamo Minsk (GK coach)
- 2015–2016: Bereza-2010 (GK coach)
- 2016: Dinamo Minsk (reserves GK coach)
- 2016–2019: Dinamo Minsk (GK coach)
- 2019–2021: Dinamo Minsk (reserves GK coach)
- 2022: Dinamo Minsk (GK coach)
- 2023–: Dinamo Minsk (reserves GK coach)
- * Club domestic league appearances and goals

Aleksandr Aleksandrovich Martyoshkin (Belarusian: Аляксандр Аляксандравіч Марцёшкін; Russian: Александр Александрович Мартёшкин; born 29 June 1970) is a Belarusian football coach and a former player. He is a goalkeepers coach for the reserves team of FC Dinamo Minsk.

== Honours ==
Shakhtyor Soligorsk

- Belarusian Cup winner: 2003–04

Dinamo Minsk

- Belarusian Premier League champion: 2004
