= FC Vidnoye =

Russian football club

- Full name: Football Club Vidnoye
- Founded: 2002
Home colours	Away colours

FC Vidnoye (Russian: Футбольный клуб «Видное») is a Russian football team from Vidnoye, Moscow Oblast. It played professionally in the Russian Second Division in 2003 and 2004. In 2003 it took sixth place in the West Zone, and it was leading the table in the middle of the 2004 season when it was forced to drop out of the competition due to financial problems. It now plays on amateur level.

== Team name and location history ==
- 2002: FC Nosorogi Volodarskogo
- 2003–: FC Vidnoye
