= 2007–08 Gabala FC season =

Gabala
2007-08 season
- Chairman: Taleh Heydərov
- Manager: Ramiz Mammadov
- Stadium: Gabala City Stadium
- Premier League: 6th
- Azerbaijan Cup: Semifinals vs Khazar Lankaran
- Top goalscorer: League: Vitali Balamestny (8); All: Vitali Balamestny (8)
Home colours	Away colours

The Gabala FC 2007–08 season was Gabala FC's second Azerbaijan Premier League season, and their second season under manager Ramiz Mammadov. They finished the season in 6th place, whilst they also took part in the 2007–08 Azerbaijan Cup, which they were knocked out of in the Semifinals by Khazar Lankaran.

== Squad ==
As of match played 28 May 2008

No.	Name	Nationality	Position	Date of birth (age)	Signed from	Signed in	Contract ends	Apps.	Goals
Goalkeepers
1	Zurab Mamaladze	(Georgia (country))	GK	2 October 1982 (aged 25)	Sioni Bolnisi	2007			
12	Elnar Karimov	(Azerbaijan)	GK	5 April 1985 (aged 23)	Khazar Lankaran	2006			
Defenders
2	Ruslan Huseynov	(Azerbaijan)	DF			2007			
4	Irakli Vashakidze	(Georgia (country))	DF	13 March 1976 (aged 32)	Turan Tovuz	2007			
5	Ali Ismaylov	(Azerbaijan)	DF	19 December 1981 (aged 26)	Adliyya Baku	2005			
17	Eldaniz Suleymanov	(Azerbaijan)	DF			2007			
19	Vugar Hasanov	(Azerbaijan)	DF			2007			
20	Ceyhun Adishirinov	(Azerbaijan)	DF	30 June 1984 (aged 23)	MKT-Araz	2007			
	Agshin Salahov	(Azerbaijan)	DF			2007			
Midfielders
3	Anatoli Tebloyev	(Russia)	MF	16 July 1974 (aged 33)	Znamya Truda	2007			
6	Kader Camara	(Guinea)	MF	16 August 1977 (aged 30)	Dessel Sport	2007			
7	Şəhruz Mustafayev	(Azerbaijan)	MF	8 September 1975 (aged 32)	Olimpik Baku	2007			
8	Ibrahim Huseynov	(Azerbaijan)	MF	16 August 1977 (aged 30)		2005			
10	Tornike Aptsiauri	(Georgia (country))	MF	29 November 1979 (aged 28)	Olimpi Rustavi	2007			
11	Samir Mammadov	(Azerbaijan)	MF	20 October 1980 (aged 27)		2006			
13	Habib Agayev	(Azerbaijan)	MF			2007			
16	Subhi Məmmədov	(Azerbaijan)	MF		Kapaz	2006			
21	Azer Hashimov	(Azerbaijan)	MF	6 November 1984 (aged 23)		2007			
22	Parvin Pashaev	(Azerbaijan)	MF	29 August 1988 (aged 19)	Neftçi	2007			
23	Abdulkadir Öz	(Turkey)	MF	14 January 1982 (aged 26)	Erzurumspor	2007			
24	Ali Abishov	(Azerbaijan)	MF	31 August 1968 (aged 39)	Shahdag-Samur	2006			
27	Giorgi Gabidauri	(Georgia (country))	MF	6 December 1979 (aged 28)	Shakhter Karagandy	2007			
28	Azar Jabbarov	(Azerbaijan)	MF	23 July 1978 (aged 29)	MKT-Araz	2008			
29	Jamal Mammadov	(Azerbaijan)	MF	26 December 1983 (aged 24)		2007			
	Rahman Azizov	(Azerbaijan)	MF	2 July 1982 (aged 25)		2005			
Forwards
9	Vitali Balamestny	(Russia)	FW	28 July 1980 (aged 27)	Dynamo Stavropol	2006			
14	Vladimir Țaranu	(Moldova)	FW	27 July 1982 (aged 25)	Nistru Otaci	2008			
25	Samir Zargarov	(Azerbaijan)	FW	29 September 1986 (aged 21)	Adliyya Baku	2006			
	Erivelto	(Brazil)	FW	7 April 1982 (aged 26)	on loan from Rio Branco-SP	2008	2008		
Out on loan
Left during the season
15	Ngoy Bomboko	(Democratic Republic of the Congo)	FW	21 May 1977 (aged 30)	on loan from TP Mazembe	2007	2007		

== Transfers ==
=== In ===
Date	Position	Nationality	Name	From	Fee	Ref.
Summer 2007	GK	(Georgia (country))	Zurab Mamaladze	Sioni Bolnisi	Undisclosed	
Summer 2007	DF	(Azerbaijan)	Ceyhun Adishirinov	MKT-Araz	Undisclosed	
Summer 2007	DF	(Azerbaijan)	Ruslan Huseynov			
Summer 2007	DF	(Azerbaijan)	Agshin Salahov			
Summer 2007	DF	(Georgia (country))	Irakli Vashakidze	Turan Tovuz	Undisclosed	
Summer 2007	MF	(Azerbaijan)	Habib Agayev			
Summer 2007	MF	(Azerbaijan)	Azer Hashimov			
Summer 2007	MF	(Azerbaijan)	Jamal Mammadov			
Summer 2007	MF	(Azerbaijan)	Parvin Pashaev	Neftçi	Undisclosed	
Summer 2007	MF	(Georgia (country))	Tornike Aptsiauri	Olimpi Rustavi	Undisclosed	
Summer 2007	MF	(Georgia (country))	Giorgi Gabidauri	Shakhter Karagandy	Undisclosed	
Summer 2007	MF	(Guinea)	Kader Camara	Dessel Sport	Undisclosed	
Summer 2007	MF	(Russia)	Anatoli Tebloyev	Znamya Truda	Undisclosed	
Summer 2007	MF	(Turkey)	Abdulkadir Öz	Erzurumspor	Undisclosed	
Winter 2008	MF	(Azerbaijan)	Azar Jabbarov	MKT-Araz	Undisclosed	
Winter 2008	FW	(Moldova)	Vladimir Țaranu	Nistru Otaci	Undisclosed	

=== Loans in ===
Date from	Position	Nationality	Name	From	Date to	Ref.
Summer 2007	FW	(Democratic Republic of the Congo)	Ngoy Bomboko	TP Mazembe	Winter 2008	
Winter 2008	FW	(Brazil)	Erivelto	Rio Branco-SP	Summer 2008	

=== Released ===
Date	Position	Nationality	Name	Joined	Date	Ref
Summer 2008	GK	(Georgia (country))	Zurab Mamaladze	Mglebi Zugdidi		
Summer 2008	DF	(Georgia (country))	Irakli Vashakidze	Merani Martvili		
Summer 2008	MF	(Georgia (country))	Giorgi Gabidauri	Metalurgi Rustavi		
Summer 2008	MF	(Turkey)	Abdulkadir Öz	Bakili Baku		
Summer 2008	FW	(Moldova)	Vladimir Țaranu	Nistru Otaci		
Summer 2008	FW	(Russia)	Vitali Balamestny	Krasnodar		

== Competitions ==
=== Overview ===
Competition	First match	Last match	Starting round	Final position	Record							
Competition	First match	Last match	Starting round	Final position	Pld	W	D	L	GF	GA	GD	Win %
Premier League	11 August 2007	28 May 2008	Matchday 1	6th	26	11	3	12	33	36	−3	42.31
Azerbaijan Cup	26 September 2007	23 April 2008	First Round	Semifinal	8	3	3	2	10	8	+2	37.50
Total					34	14	6	14	43	44	−1	41.18

Last updated: 28 May 2008
Source: Competitions

=== Premier League ===
==== Results summary ====
Overall								Home						Away					
Pld	W	D	L	GF	GA	GD	Pts	W	D	L	GF	GA	GD	W	D	L	GF	GA	GD
26	10	3	13	33	36	−3	33	7	3	3	18	12	+6	3	0	10	15	24	−9

Last updated: 28 May 2008.
Source: Soccerway

==== Results by round ====
Round	1	2	3	4	5	6	7	8	9	10	11	12	13	14	15	16	17	18	19	20	21	22	23	24	25	26
Ground	A	H	A	H	A	H	A	H	A	H	A	A	H	H	A	H	A	A	H	A	H	H	A	H	H	A
Result	W	W	L	L	L	W	L	L	W	W	W	L	W	W	L	L	L	W	D	L	W	W	L	D	D	L
Position																										6

Source: Soccerway
A = Away; H = Home; W = Win; D = Draw; L = Loss

==== Results ====
11 August 2007 1	Standard Baku	0 – 1	Gabala	Baku
17:00 AZST (UTC+5)		Summary	Aptsiauri 53'	Stadium: Shafa Stadium

19 August 2007 2	Gabala	2 – 0	Baku	Qabala
17:00 AZST (UTC+5)	Balamestny 76'; Aptsiauri 80'	Summary		Stadium: Gabala City Stadium

26 August 2007 3	Neftchi Baku	2 – 0	Gabala	Baku
18:00 AZST (UTC+5)	Mammadov 25'; Subašić 88'	Summary		Stadium: Tofik Bakhramov Stadium

2 September 2007 4	Gabala	0 – 1	Olimpik Baku	Qabala
19:00 AZST (UTC+5)		Summary	Ismayilov 35'	Stadium: Gabala City Stadium

15 September 2007 5	Simurq	2 – 0	Gabala	Zaqatala
18:00 AZST (UTC+5)	Sayadov 25'; Danaev 70'	Summary		Stadium: Zaqatala City Stadium

23 September 2007 6	Gabala	1 – 0	Karvan	Qabala
17:00 AZST (UTC+5)	Ngoy 30'	Summary		Stadium: Gabala City Stadium

30 September 2007 7	Khazar Lankaran	2 – 1	Gabala	Lankaran
18:00 AZST (UTC+5)	Ramazanov 21'; Quliyev 90'	Summary	Aptsiauri 37'	Stadium: Lankaran City Stadium

6 October 2007 8	Gabala	1 – 2	Qarabağ	Qabala
15:00 AZST (UTC+5)	Ngoy 62'	Summary	Kerimov 14'; Beraia 48'	Stadium: Gabala City Stadium

27 October 2007 9	ABN Bärdä	1 – 2	Gabala	Barda
22:25 AZST (UTC+5)	Alekberov 23'	Summary	Ngoy 3', 70'	Stadium: Barda City Stadium

3 November 2007 10	Gabala	2 – 1	Turan Tovuz	Qabala
15:00 AZT (UTC+4)	Zargarov 19'; Adishirinov 43'	Summary	Gadiri 85'	Stadium: Gabala City Stadium

11 November 2007 11	Gänclärbirliyi Sumqayit	0 – 6	Gabala	Sumqayit
15:00 AZT (UTC+4)		Summary	Balamestny 36', 57', 61', 66'; Jabbarov 72'; Zargarov 77'	Stadium: Mehdi Huseynzade Stadium

24 November 2007 12	Masallı	1 – 0	Gabala	Masally
15:00 AZT (UTC+4)	Osmar 51'	Summary		Stadium: Anatoly Banishevski Stadium

2 December 2007 13	Gabala	2 – 1	Inter Baku	Qabala
15:00 AZT (UTC+4)	Balamestny 12', 46'	Summary	Hajiyev 63'	Stadium: Gabala City Stadium

17 February 2008 14	Gabala	1 – 0	Standard Baku	Qabala
15:00 AZT (UTC+4)	Taranu 58'	Summary		Stadium: Gabala City Stadium

24 February 2008 15	Baku	3 – 0	Gabala	Baku
15:00 AZT (UTC+4)	Tijani 16'; Cisse 56'; Ponomarev 86'	Summary		Stadium: Tofig Bakhramov Stadium

2 March 2008 16	Gabala	2 – 3	Neftchi Baku	Qabala
15:00 AZT (UTC+4)	Taranu 55'; Tebloyev 71'	Summary	Subašić 30'; Kruglov 46'; Adamia 90' (pen.)	Stadium: Gabala City Stadium

15 March 2008 17	Olimpik Baku	2 – 0	Gabala	Baku
15:00 AZT (UTC+4)	Junivan 22'; Fábio 79'	Summary		Stadium: Shafa Stadium

30 March 2008 18	Karvan	1 – 2	Gabala	Yevlakh
16:00 AZST (UTC+5)	Camara 74'	Summary	Zargarov 1' (pen.); Jabbarov 49'	Stadium: Yevlakh Stadium

5 April 2008 19	Gabala	1 – 1	Khazar Lankaran	Qabala
16:00 AZST (UTC+5)	Mamedov 72'	Summary	Ramazanov 10'	Stadium: Gabala City Stadium

13 April 2008 20	Qarabağ	2 – 1	Gabala	Baku
16:00 AZST (UTC+5)	K.Kerimov 8'; A.Kerimov 55'	Summary	Tebloyev 80'	Stadium: Tofig Bakhramov Stadium^{1}

19 April 2008 21	Gabala	2 – 0	ABN Bärdä	Qabala
16:00 AZST (UTC+5)	Taranu 44'; Balamestny 60'	Summary		Stadium: Gabala City Stadium

27 April 2008 22	Gabala	1 – 0	Simurq	Qabala
16:00 AZST (UTC+5)	Mustafayev 63'	Summary		Stadium: Gabala City Stadium

3 May 2008 23	Turan Tovuz	4 – 2	Gabala	Tovuz
17:00 AZST (UTC+5)	Gadiri 7'; Guseynov 34'; Garaev 37'; Alekperov 40' (pen.)	Summary	Aptsiauri 70'; Taranu 87'	Stadium: Tovuz City Stadium

12 May 2008 24	Gabala	2 – 2	Gänclärbirliyi Sumqayit	Qabala
17:00 AZST (UTC+5)	Niftaliev 25' (o.g.); Ismaylov 43'	Summary; Summary	Stanić 32'; Amiraslanov 80'	Stadium: Gabala City Stadium; Attendance: 1,500; Referee: Fariz Yusifov

18 May 2008 25	Gabala	1 – 1	Masallı	Qabala
17:00 AZST (UTC+5)	Jabbarov 45'; Ismaylov (red card) 73'	Summary	Hugo Santos 70'	Stadium: Gabala City Stadium

28 May 2008 26	Inter Baku	4 – 0	Gabala	Baku
20:00 AZST (UTC+5)	Cuello 22'; K.Mammadov 35'; Qurbanov 44'; Zlatinov 77'	Summary		Stadium: Zabrat Stadium

==== Table ====
Pos	Team	Pld	W	D	L	GF	GA	GD	Pts	Qualification or relegation
4	Khazar Lankaran	26	14	10	2	44	16	+28	52	Qualification for UEFA Cup first qualifying round (Note: Khazar Lankaran qualified for the first qualifiying round of the 1st qualifying round of the UEFA Cup as winners of the 2007–08 Azerbaijan Cup.)
5	Qarabağ	26	11	8	7	25	16	+9	41	
6	Gabala	26	11	3	12	33	36	−3	36	
7	Simurq	26	9	9	8	31	25	+6	36	
8	Baku	26	8	11	7	35	26	+9	35	

Source: Azerbaijan Professional Football league
Rules for classification: 1) points; 2) goal difference; 3) number of goals scored.

=== Azerbaijan Cup ===
26 September 2007 1st Round 1st Leg	MOIK Baku	0 – 2	Gabala	Baku
		[ Summary]		Stadium: MOIK Stadium

3 October 2007 1st Round 2nd Leg	Gabala	2 – 0 (4 – 0 agg.)	MOIK Baku	Qabala
		[ Summary]		Stadium: Gabala City Stadium

24 October 2007 Round of 16 1st Leg	Gabala	1 – 0	Simurq	Qabala
	Öz 9'	Summary		Stadium: Gabala City Stadium

30 October 2007 Round of 16 2nd Leg	Simurq	2 – 1 (2 – 2 agg.)	Gabala	Zaqatala
	Musayev 79'; Malygin 90+4'	Summary	Camara 76'	Stadium: Zaqatala City Stadium

6 March 2008 Quarterfinals 1st Leg	Baku	1 – 1	Gabala	Baku
15:00 AZT (UTC+4)	Tijani 28'	Summary; Summary	Zargarov 21'	Stadium: Tofig Bakhramov Stadium

19 March 2008 Quarterfinals 2nd Leg	Gabala	1 – 1 (2 – 2 agg.) (5 – 4 p)	Baku	Qabala
		Summary		Stadium: Gabala City Stadium

9 April 2008 Semifinals 1st Leg	Gabala	1 – 3	Khazar Lankaran	Qabala
17:00 AZST (UTC+5)	Huseynov 75'	Summary; Gabala	Ramazanov 12', 56'; Vashakidze 15' (o.g.)	Stadium: Gabala City Stadium

23 April 2008 Semifinals 2nd Leg	Khazar Lankaran	1 – 1 (4 – 2 agg.)	Gabala	Lankaran
18:00 AZST (UTC+5)	Amirguliyev 81'	Summary; Summary	Camara 25'	Stadium: Lankaran City Stadium

== Squad statistics ==
As of match played 28 May 2008

=== Appearances and goals ===
No.	Pos	Nat	Player	Total		Premier League		Azerbaijan Cup	
No.	Pos	Nat	Player	Apps	Goals	Apps	Goals	Apps	Goals
1	GK	(Georgia (country)) GEO	Zurab Mamaladze	21	0	21	0	0	0
2	DF	(Azerbaijan) AZE	Ruslan Huseynov	0	0	0	0	0	0
3	MF	(Russia) RUS	Anatoli Tebloyev	13	0	13	0	0	0
4	DF	(Georgia (country)) GEO	Irakli Vashakidze	24	1	24	1	0	0
5	DF	(Azerbaijan) AZE	Ali Ismaylov	21	1	21	1	0	0
6	MF	(Guinea) GUI	Abdoul Kader Camara	18	0	18	0	0	0
7	MF	(Azerbaijan) AZE	Shahruz Mustafayev	18	1	18	1	0	0
8	DF	(Azerbaijan) AZE	Ibrahim Huseynov	7	1	7	1	0	0
9	FW	(Russia) RUS	Vitali Balamestny	18	8	18	8	0	0
10	MF	(Georgia (country)) GEO	Tornike Aptsiauri	24	4	24	4	0	0
11	DF	(Azerbaijan) AZE	Samir Mamedov	15	0	15	0	0	0
12	GK	(Azerbaijan) AZE	Elnar Karimov	5	0	5	0	0	0
13	MF	(Azerbaijan) AZE	Habib Agayev	0	0	0	0	0	0
14	FW	(Moldova) MDA	Vladimir Ţaranu	12	4	12	4	0	0
15	FW	(Democratic Republic of the Congo) COD	Mbomboko Fiston Ngoy	11	4	11	4	0	0
16	DF	(Azerbaijan) AZE	Sabuhi Mamedov	0	0	0	0	0	0
17	DF	(Azerbaijan) AZE	Eldaniz Suleymanov	5	0	5	0	0	0
19	DF	(Azerbaijan) AZE	Vugar Hasanov	23	0	23	0	0	0
20	DF	(Azerbaijan) AZE	Ceyhun Adishirinov	10	1	10	1	0	0
21	MF	(Azerbaijan) AZE	Azer Hashimov	21	0	21	0	0	0
22	MF	(Azerbaijan) AZE	Parvin Pashayev	5	0	5	0	0	0
23	MF	(Turkey) TUR	Abdulkadir Öz	8	0	8	0	0	0
24	MF	(Azerbaijan) AZE	Ali Abishov	1	0	1	0	0	0
25	MF	(Azerbaijan) AZE	Samir Zargarov	24	3	24	3	0	0
27	MF	(Georgia (country)) GEO	Giorgi Gabidauri	19	0	19	0	0	0
28	MF	(Azerbaijan) AZE	Azer Jabbarov	9	4	9	4	0	0
29	DF	(Azerbaijan) AZE	Jamal Mamedov	19	1	19	1	0	0
	DF	(Azerbaijan) AZE	Agshin Salahov	2	0	2	0	0	0
	MF	(Azerbaijan) AZE	Rahman Azizov	4	0	4	0	0	0
	FW	(Brazil) BRA	Erivelto	2	0	2	0	0	0
Players who appeared for Gabala no longer at the club:

=== Goal scorers ===
Place	Position	Nation	Number	Name	Premier League	Azerbaijan Cup	Total
1	FW	(Russia)	9	Vitali Balamestny	8	0	8
2	FW	(Azerbaijan)	25	Samir Zargarov	3	2	5
3	MF	(Georgia (country))	10	Tornike Aptsiauri	4	0	4
3	FW	(Democratic Republic of the Congo)	15	Mbomboko Fiston Ngoy	4	0	4
3	FW	(Moldova)	14	Vladimir Ţaranu	4	0	4
3	MF	(Azerbaijan)	28	Azer Jabbarov	4	0	4
7	DF	(Azerbaijan)	8	Ibrahim Huseynov	1	1	2
7	MF	(Guinea)	6	Abdoul Kader Camara	0	2	2
9	DF	(Azerbaijan)	20	Ceyhun Adishirinov	1	0	1
9	MF	(Azerbaijan)	7	Shahruz Mustafayev	1	0	1
9	DF	(Azerbaijan)	5	Ali Ismaylov	1	0	1
9	DF	(Azerbaijan)	29	Jamal Mamedov	1	0	1
9	DF	(Georgia (country))	4	Irakli Vashakidze	1	0	1
9	MF	(Turkey)	23	Abdulkadir Öz	0	1	1
9				Unknown	0	4	4
9				Own goal	0	1	1
				TOTALS	33	11	44

== Team kit ==
These are the 2007–08 Gabala F.C. kits.

Supplier: Erreà
Sponsor(s): Hyundai

Gabala's Home Kit	Gabala's Away Kit

== Notes ==
- Qarabağ have played their home games at the Tofiq Bahramov Stadium since 1993 due to the ongoing situation in Quzanlı.
