= List of Gabala FC records and statistics =

Gabala FK is an Azerbaijani professional football club based in Qabala.

This list encompasses the major records set by the club and their players in the Azerbaijan Premier League. The player records section includes details of the club's goalscorers and those who have made more than 50 appearances in first-team competitions.

== Player ==
=== Most appearances ===
As of match played 7 November 2026

Players played over 50 competitive, professional matches only.

| | Name | Years | League apps | League goals | Playoff apps | Playoff goals | Cup apps | Cup goals | Europe apps | Europe goals | Total apps | Total goals | International Career |
|---|---|---|---|---|---|---|---|---|---|---|---|---|---|
| 1 | (Azerbaijan) Ürfan Abbasov | 2011–2019, 2021–2024 | 248 | 5 | 0 | 0 | 40 | 1 | 17 | 0 | 305 | 6 | Azerbaijan |
| 2 | (Azerbaijan) Asif Mammadov | 2006-2007, 2015–Present | 209 | 13 | 0 | 0 | 31 | 3 | 24 | 1 | 264 | 17 | Azerbaijan |
| 3 | (Azerbaijan) Murad Musayev | 2013–2016, 2019–2026 | 167 | 7 | 1 | 0 | 23 | 0 | 3 | 0 | 193 | 7 | Azerbaijan U19 |
| 4 | (Ukraine) Dmytro Bezotosnyi | 2015–2019 | 117 | 0 | 0 | 0 | 17 | 0 | 32 | 0 | 166 | 0 | - |
| 5 | (Brazil) Dodô | 2011–2016 | 131 | 23 | 0 | 0 | 15 | 3 | 15 | 4 | 161 | 30 | - |
| 6 | (Azerbaijan) Elvin Camalov | 2013–2019, 2026–Present | 117 | 0 | 1 | 0 | 18 | 0 | 12 | 0 | 148 | 0 | Azerbaijan |
| 7 | (Serbia) Vojislav Stanković | 2015–2016, 2016–2019 | 92 | 1 | 0 | 0 | 21 | 1 | 29 | 1 | 142 | 3 | Serbia |
| 8 | (Azerbaijan) Javid Huseynov | 2014–2015, 2016–2019, 2020-2021 | 109 | 16 | 0 | 0 | 20 | 2 | 11 | 3 | 140 | 21 | Azerbaijan |
| 8 | (Azerbaijan) Ulvi Isgandarov | 2017–2024 | 118 | 17 | 0 | 0 | 16 | 4 | 6 | 0 | 140 | 21 | Azerbaijan U21 |
| 10 | (Senegal) Victor Mendy | 2011–2015 | 112 | 29 | 0 | 0 | 13 | 4 | 2 | 0 | 127 | 33 | - |
| 11 | (Azerbaijan) Samir Zargarov | 2006–2009, 2015–2016 | 95 | 10 | 0 | 0 | 18 | 4 | 9 | 0 | 122 | 14 | Azerbaijan U21 |
| 12 | (Azerbaijan) Rövlan Muradov | 2016–2023 | 100 | 10 | 0 | 0 | 14 | 1 | 3 | 1 | 117 | 12 | Azerbaijan U21 |
| 13 | (Brazil) Rafael Santos | 2014–2017 | 72 | 2 | 0 | 0 | 12 | 0 | 20 | 0 | 104 | 2 | - |
| 14 | (Brazil) Raphael Utzig | 2020–2023, 2026–Present | 86 | 15 | 1 | 0 | 11 | 2 | 2 | 1 | 100 | 18 | - |
| 15 | (Latvia) Pāvels Doroševs | 2009–2012 | 90 | 0 | 0 | 0 | 9 | 0 | 0 | 0 | 99 | 0 | Latvia |
| 15 | (Azerbaijan) Səlahət Ağayev | 2022-2023, 2024–Present | 90 | 0 | 1 | 0 | 6 | 0 | 2 | 0 | 99 | 0 | Azerbaijan |
| 17 | (Guinea) Kader Camara | 2007–2009, 2009–2012 | 88 | 1 | 0 | 0 | 8 | 2 | 0 | 0 | 96 | 3 | Guinea |
| 18 | (Azerbaijan) Azer Hashimov | 2006–2009 | 82 | 0 | 0 | 0 | 13 | ? | 0 | 0 | 95 | 0 | - |
| 19 | (Azerbaijan) Emil Safarov | 2021–2024 | 76 | 4 | 0 | 0 | 14 | 1 | 3 | 0 | 93 | 5 | Azerbaijan |
| 19 | (Azerbaijan) Nicat Aliyev | 2022–present | 83 | 6 | 2 | 0 | 8 | 0 | 0 | 0 | 93 | 6 | - |
| 21 | (Azerbaijan) Rashad Sadiqov | 2015–2017 | 61 | 1 | 0 | 0 | 8 | 1 | 22 | 0 | 91 | 2 | Azerbaijan |
| 22 | (Serbia) Ljubo Baranin | 2009–2012 | 82 | 4 | 0 | 0 | 8 | 1 | 0 | 0 | 90 | 5 | Serbia U21 |
| 23 | (Azerbaijan) Qismət Alıyev | 2015–2020 | 70 | 1 | 0 | 0 | 13 | 0 | 3 | 0 | 86 | 0 | Azerbaijan U21 |
| 24 | (Jordan) Omar Hani | 2021–2024 | 71 | 3 | 0 | 0 | 10 | 1 | 4 | 0 | 85 | 4 | Jordan |
| 24 | (Azerbaijan) Shahin Shahniyarov | 2023–present | 76 | 4 | 2 | 0 | 7 | 0 | 0 | 0 | 85 | 4 | Azerbaijan |
| 26 | (Azerbaijan) Ali Ismaylov | 2006–2009 | 71 | 1 | 0 | 0 | 11 | ? | 0 | 0 | 82 | 1 | - |
| 27 | (Estonia) Sergei Zenjov | 2015–2017 | 47 | 7 | 0 | 0 | 6 | 0 | 27 | 7 | 80 | 14 | Estonia |
| 28 | (Ukraine) Vitaliy Vernydub | 2015–2018 | 45 | 2 | 0 | 0 | 7 | 0 | 26 | 1 | 78 | 2 | Ukraine |
| 28 | (Azerbaijan) Anar Nazirov | 2010-2013, 2014–2015, 2019–2021 | 66 | 0 | 0 | 0 | 10 | 0 | 2 | 0 | 78 | 0 | Azerbaijan |
| 30 | (Croatia) (Note: Filip Ozobić was born in Bjelovar SR Croatia, representing Croatia in 2017 before switching to represent Azerbaijan in 2021, after leaving Gabala.) Filip Ozobić | 2016–2018 | 45 | 16 | 0 | 0 | 10 | 6 | 18 | 3 | 73 | 25 | Croatia |
| 30 | (Albania) (Note: Isnik Alimi was born in Delogoždi North Macedonia, representing Albania U21 between 2014 and 2016 before switching to represent North Macedonia in 2023, after leaving Gabala.) Isnik Alimi | 2021–2023 | 61 | 17 | 0 | 0 | 10 | 5 | 2 | 0 | 73 | 22 | Albania U21 |
| 30 | (Azerbaijan) Magsad Isayev | 2021–2023 | 61 | 3 | 0 | 0 | 10 | 1 | 2 | 0 | 73 | 4 | Azerbaijan U23 |
| 33 | (Brazil) Ruan Renato | 2021–2023 | 59 | 4 | 0 | 0 | 11 | 0 | 2 | 0 | 72 | 4 | - |
| 34 | (Ukraine) Oleksiy Hai | 2015–2016 | 51 | 14 | 0 | 0 | 6 | 4 | 14 | 0 | 71 | 18 | Ukraine |
| 35 | (Brazil) Ricardinho | 2015–2017 | 36 | 1 | 0 | 0 | 6 | 1 | 27 | 1 | 69 | 3 | - |
| 36 | (France) Yannick Kamanan | 2011–2014 | 62 | 15 | 0 | 0 | 6 | 1 | 0 | 0 | 68 | 17 | - |
| 36 | (Azerbaijan) İlkin Qırtımov | 2022–2024 | 54 | 0 | 0 | 0 | 10 | 0 | 4 | 0 | 68 | 0 | Azerbaijan |
| 36 | (Republic of the Congo) Domi Massoumou | 2024–2026 | 60 | 25 | 1 | 0 | 6 | 3 | 0 | 0 | 67 | 28 | - |
| 39 | (Brazil) Bruno Silva | 2010–2012 | 58 | 2 | 0 | 0 | 7 | 0 | 0 | 0 | 65 | 2 | - |
| 39 | (Azerbaijan) Vurğun Hüseynov | 2008–2010, 2011–2013 | 65 | 4 | 0 | 0 | ? | ? | 0 | 0 | 65 | 4 | Azerbaijan |
| 39 | (Azerbaijan) (Note: Arif Dashdemirov was born in Makhachkala Dagestan ASSR, qualified to represent Azerbaijan, representing them at Youth level before making his full debut for Azerbaijan in 2010.) Arif Dashdemirov | 2009–2010, 2015–2016 | 48 | 1 | 0 | 0 | 2+ | 0 | 14 | 0 | 65 | 5 | Azerbaijan |
| 42 | (Azerbaijan) Goga Beraia | 2008–2011 | 61 | 1 | 0 | 0 | 3+ | ? | 0 | 0 | 64+ | 1 | Azerbaijan U21 |
| 43 | (Azerbaijan) Nuqay Rashidov | 2023–present | 55 | 1 | 2 | 0 | 6 | 2 | 0 | 0 | 63 | 3 | - |
| 44 | (France) Bagaliy Dabo | 2016–2018 | 43 | 20 | 0 | 0 | 6 | 4 | 13 | 3 | 62 | 27 | - |
| 44 | (France) Steeven Joseph-Monrose | 2017–2019 | 47 | 15 | 0 | 0 | 9 | 3 | 6 | 2 | 62 | 20 | - |
| 46 | (Azerbaijan) (Note: Mahammad Mirzabeyov was born in Makhachkala Dagestan ASSR, representing Russia at Youth level before switching to Azerbaijan in 2015) Mahammad Mirzabeyov | 2015–2017 | 45 | 0 | 0 | 0 | 5 | 0 | 11 | 0 | 61 | 0 | Azerbaijan |
| 47 | (Azerbaijan) (Note: Nodar Mammadov was born in Kaspi Georgian SSR, but qualified to represent Azerbaijan, representing them at Youth level before making his full debut for Azerbaijan in 2007) Nodar Mammadov | 2010–2012 | 54 | 2 | 0 | 0 | 5 | 0 | 0 | 0 | 59 | 2 | Azerbaijan |
| 47 | (Azerbaijan) Yashar Abuzarov | 2009–2013 | 59 | 2 | 0 | 0 | ? | ? | 0 | 0 | 59 | 2 | - |
| 47 | (Azerbaijan) (Note: Ruslan Gurbanov was born in Stavropol Russian SFSR, but qualified to represent Azerbaijan, representing them at Youth level before making his full debut for Azerbaijan in 2015) Ruslan Gurbanov | 2016–2018 | 45 | 6 | 0 | 0 | 8 | 3 | 6 | 2 | 59 | 11 | Azerbaijan |
| 50 | (Montenegro) Stefan Vukčević | 2020–2022 | 51 | 1 | 0 | 0 | 7 | 1 | 0 | 0 | 58 | 2 | Montenegro U21 |
| 50 | (Georgia (country)) Tornike Aptsiauri | 2007–2009 | 46 | 7 | 0 | 0 | 12 | 0 | 0 | 0 | 58 | 7 | Georgia |
| 52 | (Nigeria) James Adeniyi | 2018–2021 | 48 | 14 | 0 | 0 | 7 | 4 | 2 | 0 | 57 | 18 | - |
| 52 | (Azerbaijan) Eshqin Ahmadov | 2023–present | 54 | 2 | 1 | 0 | 2 | 0 | 0 | 0 | 57 | 2 | - |
| 54 | (Morocco) (Note: Ayyoub Allach was born in Mechelen Belgium, but qualified to represent Morocco, representing that at Youth level in 2015.) Ayyoub Allach | 2023–2024 | 46 | 8 | 0 | 0 | 8 | 0 | 2 | 2 | 56 | 10 | Morocco U20 |
| 55 | (Jamaica) (Note: Deon Burton was born in Reading England, but qualified to represent Jamaica, making his debut for Jamaica in 1997.) Deon Burton | 2010–2012 | 50 | 15 | 0 | 0 | 5 | 0 | 0 | 0 | 55 | 15 | Jamaica |
| 56 | (Serbia) Milan Antic | 2009–2011 | 54 | 6 | 0 | 0 | ? | ? | 0 | 0 | 54 | 6 | - |
| 56 | (Netherlands) Steve Olfers | 2010–2012 | 49 | 0 | 0 | 0 | 5 | 0 | 0 | 0 | 54 | 0 | - |
| 58 | (Argentina) (Note: Cristian Torres was born in Vicente López Argentina, but qualified to represent Latvia, making his debut for Latvia in 2016, after leaving Gabala.) Cristian Torres | 2009–2011 | 52 | 7 | 0 | 0 | 1+ | 0 | 0 | 0 | 53 | 7 | - |
| 59 | (Azerbaijan) (Note: Aleksandr Chertoganov was born in Dnipro Ukrainian SSR, but qualified to represent Azerbaijan, making his debut for Azerbaijan in 2006.) Aleksandr Chertoganov | 2011–2013 | 49 | 3 | 0 | 0 | 3 | 0 | 0 | 0 | 52 | 3 | Azerbaijan |
| 60 | (Azerbaijan) Ruslan Abishov | 2014, 2015–2016 | 44 | 4 | 0 | 0 | 5 | 0 | 2 | 0 | 51 | 4 | Azerbaijan |

=== Goal scorers ===
As of match played 7 November 2026
Competitive, professional matches only, appearances including substitutes appear in brackets.

| | Name | Years | League apps | League goals | Playoff apps | Playoff goals | Cup apps | Cup goals | Europe apps | Europe goals | Total apps | Total goals | Ratio |
|---|---|---|---|---|---|---|---|---|---|---|---|---|---|
| 1 | (Senegal) Victor Mendy | 2011–2015 | 112 | 29 | 0 | 0 | 13 | 4 | 2 | 0 | 127 | 33 | 0.26 |
| 2 | (Brazil) Dodô | 2011–2016 | 131 | 23 | 0 | 0 | 15 | 3 | 15 | 4 | 161 | 30 | 0.19 |
| 3 | (France) Bagaliy Dabo | 2016–2018 | 43 | 20 | 0 | 0 | 6 | 4 | 13 | 3 | 62 | 27 | 0.44 |
| 3 | (Republic of the Congo) Domi Massoumou | 2024–2026 | 60 | 25 | 1 | 0 | 6 | 3 | 0 | 0 | 67 | 28 | 0.42 |
| 5 | (Croatia) Filip Ozobić | 2016–2018 | 45 | 16 | 0 | 0 | 10 | 6 | 18 | 3 | 73 | 25 | 0.34 |
| 6 | (Albania) Isnik Alimi | 2021–2023 | 61 | 17 | 0 | 0 | 10 | 5 | 2 | 0 | 73 | 22 | 0.3 |
| 7 | (Azerbaijan) Javid Huseynov | 2014–2015, 2016–2019, 2020-2021 | 109 | 16 | 0 | 0 | 20 | 2 | 11 | 3 | 140 | 21 | 0.15 |
| 7 | (Azerbaijan) Ulvi Isgandarov | 2017–2024 | 118 | 17 | 0 | 0 | 16 | 4 | 6 | 0 | 140 | 21 | 0.15 |
| 9 | (France) Steeven Joseph-Monrose | 2017–2019 | 47 | 15 | 0 | 0 | 9 | 3 | 6 | 2 | 62 | 20 | 0.32 |
| 10 | (Switzerland) (Note: Danijel Subotić was born in Zagreb SR Croatia, but qualified to represent Switzerland, representing them at Youth level.) Danijel Subotić | 2013-2014, 2017 | 40 | 15 | 0 | 0 | 8 | 4 | 0 | 0 | 48 | 19 | 0.4 |
| 11 | (Azerbaijan) Kanan Karimov | 2008–2010 | 46 | 11 | 0 | 0 | ? | 7 | 0 | 0 | 45+ | 18 | 0.4 |
| 11 | (Ukraine) Oleksiy Hai | 2015–2016 | 51 | 14 | 0 | 0 | 6 | 4 | 14 | 0 | 71 | 18 | 0.25 |
| 11 | (Nigeria) James Adeniyi | 2018–2021 | 48 | 14 | 0 | 0 | 7 | 4 | 2 | 0 | 57 | 18 | 0.32 |
| 11 | (Brazil) Raphael Utzig | 2020–2023 | 81 | 15 | 0 | 0 | 11 | 2 | 2 | 1 | 94 | 18 | 0.19 |
| 15 | (France) Yannick Kamanan | 2011–2014 | 62 | 15 | 0 | 0 | 6 | 1 | 0 | 0 | 68 | 17 | 0.25 |
| 15 | (Azerbaijan) Asif Mammadov | 2006-2007, 2015–2026 | 208 | 13 | 0 | 0 | 31 | 3 | 24 | 1 | 263 | 17 | 0.06 |
| 17 | (Jamaica) Deon Burton | 2010–2012 | 50 | 15 | 0 | 0 | 5 | 0 | 0 | 0 | 55 | 15 | 0.27 |
| 18 | (Azerbaijan) Samir Zargarov | 2006–2009, 2015–2016 | 95 | 10 | 0 | 0 | 18 | 4 | 9 | 0 | 122 | 14 | 0.11 |
| 18 | (Estonia) Sergei Zenjov | 2015–2017 | 47 | 7 | 0 | 0 | 6 | 0 | 27 | 7 | 80 | 14 | 0.18 |
| 20 | Own Goals | 2005–Present | 651 | 12 | 1 | 1 | 89 | 0 | 42 | 0 | 783 | 13 | 0.02 |
| 21 | (Russia) Vitali Balamestny | 2006–2008 | 30 | 11 | 0 | 0 | ? | 1 | 0 | 0 | 30+ | 12 | 0.4 |
| 21 | (Azerbaijan) Rovlan Muradov | 2016–2023 | 100 | 10 | 0 | 0 | 14 | 1 | 3 | 1 | 117 | 12 | 0.1 |
| 23 | (Azerbaijan) Ruslan Gurbanov | 2016–2018 | 45 | 6 | 0 | 0 | 8 | 3 | 6 | 2 | 59 | 11 | 0.19 |
| 24 | (Bosnia and Herzegovina) Ermin Zec | 2015-2016 | 23 | 7 | 0 | 0 | 4 | 3 | 9 | 0 | 36 | 10 | 0.28 |
| 24 | (Georgia (country)) Davit Volkovi | 2019 | 27 | 7 | 0 | 0 | 5 | 3 | 2 | 0 | 34 | 10 | 0.29 |
| 24 | (Brazil) Ramon | 2022–2023 | 32 | 8 | 0 | 0 | 5 | 2 | 0 | 0 | 37 | 10 | 0.27 |
| 24 | (Israel) Osama Khalaila | 2023–2024 | 33 | 9 | 0 | 0 | 5 | 1 | 2 | 0 | 40 | 10 | 0.25 |
| 24 | (Morocco) Ayyoub Allach | 2023–2024 | 46 | 8 | 0 | 0 | 8 | 0 | 2 | 2 | 56 | 10 | 0.18 |
| 29 | (Azerbaijan) Vusal Garaev | 2006-2007 | 20 | 4 | 0 | 0 | ? | 5 | 0 | 0 | 20+ | 9 | 0.45 |
| 29 | (Iran) Farzad Hatami | 2008–2009 | 22 | 8 | 0 | 0 | ? | 1 | 0 | 0 | 23+ | 9 | 0.39 |
| 29 | (Azerbaijan) Elshad Taghiyev | 2024–2026 | 35 | 9 | 0 | 0 | 4 | 0 | 0 | 0 | 39 | 9 | 0.23 |
| 32 | (Brazil) Leonardo | 2013-2014 | 31 | 7 | 0 | 0 | 2 | 1 | 0 | 0 | 33 | 8 | 0.24 |
| 32 | (Netherlands) Lorenzo Ebecilio | 2013-2014 | 32 | 8 | 0 | 0 | 5 | 0 | 0 | 0 | 37 | 8 | 0.22 |
| 32 | (Ukraine) Oleksiy Antonov | 2015-2016 | 32 | 7 | 0 | 0 | 3 | 0 | 14 | 1 | 49 | 8 | 0.16 |
| 32 | (Nigeria) Abdullahi Shuaibu | 2024–2025 | 27 | 8 | 0 | 0 | 2 | 0 | 0 | 0 | 29 | 8 | 0.28 |
| 36 | (Georgia (country)) Tornike Aptsiauri | 2007–2009 | 46 | 7 | 0 | 0 | 12 | 0 | 0 | 0 | 58 | 7 | 0.12 |
| 36 | (Poland) Tomasz Stolpa | 2009–2010 | 31 | 7 | 0 | 0 | ? | 0 | 0 | 0 | 31+ | 7 | 0.23 |
| 36 | (Argentina) Cristian Torres | 2009–2011 | 52 | 7 | 0 | 0 | 1 | 0 | 0 | 0 | 53 | 7 | 0.13 |
| 36 | (Liberia) Theo Weeks | 2016–2017 | 16 | 2 | 0 | 0 | 5 | 0 | 12 | 0 | 33 | 7 | 0.21 |
| 36 | (Nigeria) Ekigho Ehiosun | 2014-2015, 2017 | 35 | 6 | 0 | 0 | 4 | 1 | 0 | 0 | 39 | 7 | 0.18 |
| 36 | (Mali) Famoussa Koné | 2017–2018 | 23 | 6 | 0 | 0 | 6 | 1 | 4 | 0 | 32 | 7 | 0.22 |
| 36 | (Slovenia) (Note: Nicolas Rajsel was born in Pontoise France, but qualified to represent Slovenia, representing them at Youth level.) Nicolas Rajsel | 2020–2021 | 30 | 7 | 0 | 0 | 3 | 0 | 0 | 0 | 33 | 7 | 0.21 |
| 36 | (Azerbaijan) Murad Musayev | 2013–2016, 2019–2026 | 167 | 7 | 1 | 0 | 23 | 0 | 3 | 0 | 194 | 7 | 0.04 |
| 36 | (Ghana) Prince Owusu | 2025–2026 | 30 | 4 | 1 | 0 | 4 | 3 | 0 | 0 | 35 | 7 | 0.2 |
| 36 | (Nigeria) Ismahil Akinade | 2026–present | 27 | 5 | 1 | 0 | 2 | 2 | 0 | 0 | 30 | 7 | 0.23 |
| 46 | (Azerbaijan) Ibrahim Huseynov | 2006-2008 | 16 | 2 | 0 | 0 | ? | 4 | 0 | 0 | 16+ | 6 | 0.38 |
| 46 | (Ukraine) Ihor Melnyk | 2009–2010 | 27 | 6 | 0 | 0 | ? | 0 | 0 | 0 | 27+ | 6 | 0.22 |
| 46 | (Serbia) Milan Antic | 2009–2011 | 54 | 6 | 0 | 0 | ? | ? | 0 | 0 | 54 | 6 | 0.11 |
| 46 | (Brazil) Lourival Assis | 2012-2014 | 36 | 6 | 0 | 0 | 8 | 0 | 0 | 0 | 44 | 6 | 0.14 |
| 46 | (Brazil) (Note: Felipe Santos was born in São Paulo Brazil, but qualified to represent Benin, making his debut for Benin in March 2026, after leaving Gabala.) Felipe Santos | 2022–2023 | 35 | 3 | 0 | 0 | 6 | 2 | 2 | 1 | 43 | 6 | 0.14 |
| 46 | (Azerbaijan) Urfan Abbasov | 2010-2019, 2021–2024 | 248 | 5 | 0 | 0 | 40 | 1 | 17 | 0 | 305 | 6 | 0.02 |
| 46 | (France) Bilel Aouacheria | 2023–2024 | 35 | 6 | 0 | 0 | 5 | 0 | 2 | 0 | 42 | 6 | 0.14 |
| 46 | (Azerbaijan) Nicat Aliyev | 2022–present | 83 | 6 | 2 | 0 | 8 | 0 | 0 | 0 | 93 | 6 | 0.06 |
| 54 | Unknown | 2006–2008 | 0 | 0 | 0 | 0 | 4 | 5 | 0 | 0 | 4 | 5 | 1.25 |
| 54 | (Serbia) Ljubo Baranin | 2009–2012 | 82 | 4 | 0 | 0 | 8 | 1 | 0 | 0 | 90 | 5 | 0.06 |
| 54 | (Azerbaijan) Rashad Abdullayev | 2012-2013 | 25 | 5 | 0 | 0 | 3 | 0 | 0 | 0 | 28 | 5 | 0.18 |
| 54 | (Argentina) Facundo Pereyra | 2015 | 14 | 4 | 0 | 0 | 1 | 1 | 5 | 0 | 20 | 5 | 0.25 |
| 54 | (Azerbaijan) Rashad Eyyubov | 2016–2017 | 25 | 3 | 0 | 0 | 8 | 2 | 8 | 0 | 41 | 5 | 0.12 |
| 54 | (Azerbaijan) Tellur Mutallimov | 2015–2017 | 24 | 5 | 0 | 0 | 4 | 0 | 2 | 0 | 30 | 5 | 0.17 |
| 54 | (Azerbaijan) Emil Safarov | 2021–2024 | 76 | 4 | 0 | 0 | 14 | 1 | 3 | 0 | 93 | 5 | 0.05 |
| 61 | (Democratic Republic of the Congo) Ngoy Bomboko | 2007-2008 | 11 | 4 | 0 | 0 | ? | 0 | 0 | 0 | 11+ | 4 | 0.36 |
| 61 | (Moldova) Vladimir Ţaranu | 2007-2008 | 12 | 4 | 0 | 0 | ? | 0 | 0 | 0 | 12+ | 4 | 0.33 |
| 61 | (Azerbaijan) Azer Jabbarov | 2007-2008 | 18 | 4 | 0 | 0 | ? | 0 | 0 | 0 | 18+ | 4 | 0.22 |
| 61 | (Azerbaijan) Vurğun Hüseynov | 2008-2010, 2011-2013 | 65 | 4 | 0 | 0 | 3 | ? | 0 | 0 | 65+ | 4 | 0.06 |
| 61 | (Azerbaijan) (Note: Sasha Yunisoglu was born in Mykolaiv Ukrainian SSR, but qualified to represent Azerbaijan, representing them at Youth level before making his full debut for Azerbaijan in 2007.) Sasha Yunisoglu | 2010-2012 | 44 | 3 | 0 | 0 | 2 | 1 | 0 | 0 | 46 | 4 | 0.09 |
| 61 | (Azerbaijan) (Note: Murad Hüseynov was born in Makhachkala Dagestan ASSR, qualified to represent Azerbaijan, making his debut for Azerbaijan in 2011.) Murad Hüseynov | 2010-2012 | 24 | 4 | 0 | 0 | 3 | 0 | 0 | 0 | 27 | 4 | 0.15 |
| 61 | (Ivory Coast) Serge Djiehoua | 2011-2012 | 9 | 2 | 0 | 0 | 1 | 2 | 0 | 0 | 10 | 4 | 0.4 |
| 61 | (Azerbaijan) Bakhtiyar Soltanov | 2014-2015 | 21 | 2 | 0 | 0 | 3 | 2 | 0 | 0 | 24 | 4 | 0.17 |
| 61 | (Azerbaijan) Ruslan Abışov | 2014-2015 | 27 | 4 | 0 | 0 | 3 | 0 | 2 | 0 | 32 | 4 | 0.13 |
| 61 | (Azerbaijan) Rauf Aliyev | 2018–2019 | 23 | 4 | 0 | 0 | 5 | 0 | 2 | 0 | 30 | 4 | 0.13 |
| 61 | (Spain) Fernán López | 2019–2020, 2021–2022 | 34 | 4 | 0 | 0 | 5 | 0 | 2 | 0 | 41 | 4 | 0.1 |
| 61 | (Azerbaijan) Magsad Isayev | 2021–2023 | 61 | 3 | 0 | 0 | 10 | 1 | 2 | 0 | 73 | 4 | 0.05 |
| 61 | (Brazil) Ruan Renato | 2021–2023 | 59 | 4 | 0 | 0 | 11 | 0 | 2 | 0 | 72 | 4 | 0.06 |
| 61 | (Jordan) Omar Hani | 2021–2024 | 71 | 3 | 0 | 0 | 10 | 1 | 4 | 0 | 85 | 4 | 0.05 |
| 61 | (Mozambique) Clésio | 2019–2020, 2024 | 29 | 1 | 0 | 0 | 4 | 3 | 2 | 0 | 35 | 4 | 0.11 |
| 61 | (Nigeria) Oche Ochowechi | 2024–2025 | 23 | 4 | 0 | 0 | 2 | 0 | 0 | 0 | 25 | 4 | 0.16 |
| 61 | (Ivory Coast) Adriel Ba Loua | 2025–2026 | 30 | 4 | 1 | 0 | 4 | 2 | 0 | 0 | 35 | 4 | 0.11 |
| 61 | (France) Ibrahim Sangaré | 2025–2026 | 25 | 2 | 1 | 0 | 1 | 2 | 0 | 0 | 27 | 4 | 0.15 |
| 61 | (Senegal) Seydina Keita | 2026 | 17 | 3 | 1 | 1 | 2 | 0 | 0 | 0 | 20 | 4 | 0.2 |
| 61 | (Azerbaijan) Shahin Shahniyarov | 2023–present | 76 | 4 | 2 | 0 | 7 | 0 | 0 | 0 | 85 | 4 | 0.05 |
| 81 | (Azerbaijan) Vasif Äliyev | 2006-2007 | 21 | 3 | 0 | 0 | ? | 0 | 0 | 0 | 21+ | 3 | 0.14 |
| 81 | (Guinea) Kader Camara | 2007-2009, 2010-2012 | 88 | 1 | 0 | 0 | 8 | 2 | 0 | 0 | 96 | 3 | 0.03 |
| 81 | (Russia) Anatoli Tebloev | 2007-2009 | 27 | 3 | 0 | 0 | ? | 0 | 0 | 0 | 27+ | 3 | 0.11 |
| 81 | (Azerbaijan) Aleksandr Chertoganov | 2011-2013 | 49 | 3 | 0 | 0 | 3 | 0 | 0 | 0 | 52 | 3 | 0.06 |
| 81 | (Ukraine) Vitaliy Vernydub | 2015–2018 | 45 | 2 | 0 | 0 | 7 | 0 | 26 | 1 | 78 | 3 | 0.04 |
| 81 | (Brazil) Ricardinho | 2015–2017 | 36 | 1 | 0 | 0 | 6 | 1 | 27 | 1 | 69 | 3 | 0.04 |
| 81 | (Serbia) Vojislav Stanković | 2015–2019 | 92 | 1 | 0 | 0 | 21 | 1 | 29 | 1 | 142 | 3 | 0.02 |
| 81 | (Ghana) Samuel Tetteh | 2023–2024 | 21 | 2 | 0 | 0 | 4 | 1 | 0 | 0 | 25 | 3 | 0.12 |
| 81 | (Israel) Fares Abu Akel | 2022–2024 | 37 | 2 | 0 | 0 | 8 | 1 | 2 | 0 | 47 | 3 | 0.06 |
| 81 | (Togo) Yaovi Akakpo | 2019–2024 | 26 | 3 | 0 | 0 | 2 | 0 | 2 | 0 | 30 | 3 | 0.1 |
| 81 | (Azerbaijan) Nuqay Rashidov | 2023–present | 55 | 1 | 2 | 0 | 6 | 2 | 0 | 0 | 63 | 3 | 0.05 |
| 92 | (Azerbaijan) Rahman Azizov | 2006-2008 | 14 | 2 | 0 | 0 | ? | 0 | 0 | 0 | 14+ | 2 | 0.14 |
| 92 | (Azerbaijan) Rovshan Veliev | 2006-2007 | 8 | 0 | 0 | 0 | ? | 2 | 0 | 0 | 8+ | 2 | 0.25 |
| 92 | (Portugal) Paulino Tavares | 2009-2010 | 14 | 2 | 0 | 0 | ? | 0 | 0 | 0 | 14+ | 2 | 0.14 |
| 92 | (Azerbaijan) Yashar Abuzerov | 2009-2013 | 59 | 2 | 0 | 0 | ? | 0 | 0 | 0 | 59+ | 2 | 0.03 |
| 92 | (Azerbaijan) Arif İsayev | 2010-2012 | 36 | 2 | 0 | 0 | 5 | 0 | 0 | 0 | 41 | 2 | 0.05 |
| 92 | (Azerbaijan) (Note: Branimir Subašić was born in Belgrade SR Serbia, but qualified to represent Azerbaijan, making his debut for Azerbaijan in 2007.) Branimir Subašić | 2010-2011 | 19 | 2 | 0 | 0 | 2 | 0 | 0 | 0 | 21 | 2 | 0.1 |
| 92 | (Azerbaijan) Nodar Mammadov | 2010-2012 | 54 | 2 | 0 | 0 | 5 | 0 | 0 | 0 | 59 | 2 | 0.03 |
| 92 | (Guinea) Oumar Kalabane | 2011-2014 | 30 | 2 | 0 | 0 | 2 | 0 | 0 | 0 | 32 | 2 | 0.06 |
| 92 | (Brazil) Bruno Barbosa | 2011-2013 | 58 | 2 | 0 | 0 | 7 | 0 | 0 | 0 | 65 | 2 | 0.03 |
| 92 | (Azerbaijan) (Note: Volodimir Levin was born in Arkhangelsk Russian SFSR, but qualified to represent Azerbaijan, making his debut for Azerbaijan in 2008.) Volodimir Levin | 2013-2015 | 26 | 2 | 0 | 0 | 3 | 0 | 0 | 0 | 31 | 2 | 0.06 |
| 92 | (Azerbaijan) Nizami Hajiyev | 2013-2014 | 29 | 0 | 0 | 0 | 5 | 2 | 0 | 0 | 36 | 2 | 0.06 |
| 92 | (Nigeria) Abdulwaheed Afolabi | 2013-2014 | 22 | 1 | 0 | 0 | 4 | 1 | 0 | 0 | 26 | 2 | 0.08 |
| 92 | (Russia) Marat Izmailov | 2014 | 14 | 1 | 0 | 0 | 4 | 1 | 0 | 0 | 18 | 2 | 0.11 |
| 92 | (Slovakia) Pavol Farkaš | 2014-2015 | 13 | 1 | 0 | 0 | 1 | 1 | 0 | 0 | 14 | 2 | 0.14 |
| 92 | (Azerbaijan) Rashad Sadiqov | 2014–2017 | 61 | 1 | 0 | 0 | 8 | 1 | 22 | 0 | 91 | 2 | 0.02 |
| 92 | (Brazil) Rafael Santos | 2014–2017 | 72 | 2 | 0 | 0 | 12 | 0 | 20 | 0 | 104 | 2 | 0.02 |
| 92 | (Azerbaijan) Elvin Mammadov | 2017–2018 | 11 | 2 | 0 | 0 | 1 | 0 | 3 | 0 | 15 | 2 | 0.13 |
| 92 | (Azerbaijan) Roman Huseynov | 2015–2021 | 35 | 2 | 0 | 0 | 8 | 0 | 3 | 0 | 46 | 2 | 0.04 |
| 92 | (Croatia) Ivica Žunić | 2019–2020 | 17 | 2 | 0 | 0 | 2 | 0 | 2 | 0 | 21 | 2 | 0.1 |
| 92 | (Azerbaijan) Yusif Nabiyev | 2016–2017, 2018–2021 | 31 | 2 | 0 | 0 | 4 | 0 | 1 | 0 | 36 | 2 | 0.06 |
| 92 | (Albania) Jurgen Goxha | 2020–2021 | 24 | 2 | 0 | 0 | 2 | 0 | 0 | 0 | 26 | 2 | 0.08 |
| 92 | (Montenegro) Stefan Vukčević | 2020–2022 | 51 | 1 | 0 | 0 | 7 | 1 | 0 | 0 | 58 | 2 | 0.03 |
| 92 | (Azerbaijan) Ruslan Voronsov | 2024–2025 | 17 | 1 | 0 | 0 | 1 | 1 | 0 | 0 | 18 | 2 | 0.11 |
| 92 | (Azerbaijan) Salman Alasgarov | 2024–present | 7 | 2 | 0 | 0 | 2 | 0 | 0 | 0 | 9 | 2 | 0.22 |
| 92 | (Azerbaijan) Farid Isgandarov | 2023–present | 40 | 1 | 2 | 0 | 6 | 1 | 0 | 0 | 48 | 2 | 0.04 |
| 92 | (Azerbaijan) Eshqin Ahmadov | 2023–present | 54 | 2 | 1 | 0 | 2 | 0 | 0 | 0 | 57 | 2 | 0.04 |
| 92 | (Ghana) Isaac Amoah | 2025–present | 40 | 2 | 2 | 0 | 4 | 0 | 0 | 0 | 46 | 2 | 0.04 |
| 119 | (Azerbaijan) Shahruz Mustafayev | 2006-2009 | 27 | 1 | 0 | 0 | ? | 0 | 0 | 0 | 27+ | 1 | 0.04 |
| 119 | (Azerbaijan) Ali Ismaylov | 2006-2009 | 46 | 1 | 0 | 0 | 11 | 0 | 0 | 0 | 57 | 1 | 0.02 |
| 119 | (Ukraine) Oleg Osadchi | 2006-2007 | 4 | 0 | 0 | 0 | ? | 1 | 0 | 0 | 4+ | 1 | 0.25 |
| 119 | (Turkey) Abdulkadir Öz | 2007-2008 | 8 | 0 | 0 | 0 | ? | 1 | 0 | 0 | 8+ | 1 | 0.13 |
| 119 | (Azerbaijan) Jamal Mamedov | 2007-2008 | 19 | 1 | 0 | 0 | ? | 0 | 0 | 0 | 19+ | 1 | 0.05 |
| 119 | (Georgia (country)) Irakli Vashakidze | 2007-2008 | 24 | 1 | 0 | 0 | ? | 0 | 0 | 0 | 24+ | 1 | 0.04 |
| 119 | (Azerbaijan) Ceyhun Adishirinov | 2007-2008 | 10 | 1 | 0 | 0 | ? | 0 | 0 | 0 | 10+ | 1 | 0.1 |
| 119 | (Moldova) Victor Comleonoc | 2009 | 10 | 1 | 0 | 0 | ? | 0 | 0 | 0 | 10+ | 1 | 0.1 |
| 119 | (Bulgaria) Asen Nikolov | 2008 | 10 | 1 | 0 | 0 | ? | 0 | 0 | 0 | 10+ | 1 | 0.1 |
| 119 | (Brazil) Tiago | 2008-2009 | 11 | 1 | 0 | 0 | ? | 0 | 0 | 0 | 11+ | 1 | 0.09 |
| 119 | (Moldova) Anatolie Ostap | 2009-2010 | 31 | 1 | 0 | 0 | ? | 0 | 0 | 0 | 31+ | 1 | 0.03 |
| 119 | (Azerbaijan) Anar Gasimov | 2008-2009 | 11 | 0 | 0 | 0 | ? | 1 | 0 | 0 | 11+ | 1 | 0.09 |
| 119 | (Azerbaijan) Parvin Pashayev | 2007-2010 | 22 | 1 | 0 | 0 | ? | 0 | 0 | 0 | 22+ | 1 | 0.05 |
| 119 | (Georgia (country)) Goga Beraia | 2008-2011 | 61 | 1 | 0 | 0 | ? | 0 | 0 | 0 | 61+ | 1 | 0.02 |
| 119 | (Romania) Răzvan Ţârlea | 2009-2011 | 46 | 1 | 0 | 0 | ? | 0 | 0 | 0 | 46+ | 1 | 0.02 |
| 119 | (Brazil) Bruno Anjos | 2010-2011 | 15 | 0 | 0 | 0 | 2 | 1 | 0 | 0 | 17 | 1 | 0.06 |
| 119 | (England) Terry Cooke | 2010-2011 | 12 | 1 | 0 | 0 | 0 | 0 | 0 | 0 | 12 | 1 | 0.08 |
| 119 | (Azerbaijan) Amil Yunanov | 2010-2014 | 21 | 1 | 0 | 0 | ? | 0 | 0 | 0 | 21+ | 1 | 0.05 |
| 119 | (Brazil) Daniel Cruz | 2011-2013 | 35 | 1 | 0 | 0 | 2 | 0 | 0 | 0 | 37 | 1 | 0.03 |
| 119 | (Slovenia) Dejan Kelhar | 2012-2013 | 35 | 1 | 0 | 0 | 3 | 0 | 0 | 0 | 38 | 1 | 0.03 |
| 119 | (Turkey) Muammer Erdoğdu | 2012 | 1 | 0 | 0 | 0 | 1 | 1 | 0 | 0 | 2 | 1 | 0.5 |
| 119 | (Slovenia) Luka Žinko | 2013 | 8 | 1 | 0 | 0 | 0 | 0 | 0 | 0 | 8 | 1 | 0.13 |
| 119 | (Senegal) Moustapha Dabo | 2013 | 7 | 1 | 0 | 0 | 1 | 0 | 0 | 0 | 8 | 1 | 0.13 |
| 119 | (Senegal) Ibrahima Niasse | 2013-2014, 2019–2020 | 32 | 1 | 0 | 0 | 8 | 0 | 0 | 0 | 40 | 1 | 0.03 |
| 119 | (Azerbaijan) Mushfig Teymurov | 2010-2015 | 18 | 1 | 0 | 0 | 3 | 0 | 0 | 0 | 21 | 1 | 0.05 |
| 119 | (Brazil) Marquinhos | 2014 | 12 | 1 | 0 | 0 | 1 | 0 | 0 | 0 | 13 | 1 | 0.08 |
| 119 | (Paraguay) David Meza | 2015 | 4 | 0 | 0 | 0 | 1 | 1 | 5 | 0 | 10 | 1 | 0.1 |
| 119 | (Azerbaijan) Vagif Javadov | 2015 | 3 | 0 | 0 | 0 | 1 | 1 | 1 | 0 | 5 | 1 | 0.2 |
| 119 | (Azerbaijan) Arif Dashdemirov | 2009-2010, 2015–2016 | 48 | 1 | 0 | 0 | 2+ | 0 | 14 | 0 | 64+ | 1 | 0.02 |
| 119 | (Georgia (country)) Nika Kvekveskiri | 2016–2017 | 14 | 0 | 0 | 0 | 4 | 0 | 11 | 1 | 29 | 1 | 0.03 |
| 119 | (Azerbaijan) Ilgar Gurbanov | 2017–2019 | 29 | 0 | 0 | 0 | 6 | 0 | 6 | 1 | 41 | 1 | 0.02 |
| 119 | (Azerbaijan) Hajiagha Hajili | 2017–2019 | 3 | 0 | 0 | 0 | 1 | 1 | 0 | 0 | 4 | 1 | 0.25 |
| 119 | (Azerbaijan) Tamkin Khalilzade | 2018 | 23 | 1 | 0 | 0 | 5 | 0 | 2 | 0 | 30 | 1 | 0.03 |
| 119 | (Azerbaijan) Rasim Ramaldanov | 2017–2021 | 32 | 1 | 0 | 0 | 4 | 0 | 3 | 0 | 39 | 1 | 0.03 |
| 119 | (Togo) Lalawélé Atakora | 2018–2019 | 23 | 1 | 0 | 0 | 4 | 0 | 2 | 0 | 4 | 1 | 0.03 |
| 119 | (Azerbaijan) Gismat Aliyev | 2016–2020 | 70 | 1 | 0 | 0 | 13 | 0 | 3 | 0 | 86 | 1 | 0.01 |
| 119 | (Azerbaijan) Amin Seydiyev | 2016–2020 | 31 | 1 | 0 | 0 | 6 | 0 | 2 | 0 | 39 | 1 | 0.03 |
| 119 | (Georgia (country)) Merab Gigauri | 2019–2021 | 40 | 1 | 0 | 0 | 5 | 0 | 2 | 0 | 47 | 1 | 0.02 |
| 119 | (Croatia) Vinko Međimorec | 2020–2021 | 23 | 1 | 0 | 0 | 3 | 0 | 0 | 0 | 26 | 1 | 0.04 |
| 119 | (Azerbaijan) Ehtiram Shahverdiyev | 2016–2017, 2020–2022 | 35 | 1 | 0 | 0 | 8 | 0 | 0 | 0 | 43 | 1 | 0.02 |
| 119 | (Nigeria) Ahmed Isaiah | 2023–2024 | 23 | 0 | 0 | 0 | 1 | 0 | 2 | 1 | 26 | 1 | 0.04 |
| 119 | (Azerbaijan) Rauf Hüseynli | 2023–2024 | 31 | 1 | 0 | 0 | 3 | 0 | 2 | 0 | 36 | 1 | 0.03 |
| 119 | (Brazil) Lucas Áfrico | 2023–2024 | 29 | 1 | 0 | 0 | 3 | 0 | 2 | 0 | 34 | 1 | 0.03 |
| 119 | (Azerbaijan) Mehrac Bakhshali | 2022–2026 | 19 | 0 | 0 | 0 | 2 | 1 | 1 | 0 | 22 | 1 | 0.05 |
| 119 | (Azerbaijan) Vugar Hasanov | 2024–2025 | 17 | 0 | 0 | 0 | 2 | 1 | 1 | 0 | 20 | 1 | 0.05 |
| 119 | (Azerbaijan) Urfan Ismayilov | 2024–2025 | 25 | 1 | 0 | 0 | 2 | 0 | 0 | 0 | 27 | 1 | 0.04 |
| 119 | (Ivory Coast) Kouya Mabea | 2026–present | 10 | 1 | 0 | 0 | 0 | 0 | 0 | 0 | 10 | 1 | 0.1 |
| 119 | (Switzerland) Karim Rossi | 2026–present | 8 | 1 | 1 | 0 | 0 | 0 | 0 | 0 | 9 | 1 | 0.11 |
| 119 | (Azerbaijan) Ziya Shakarkhanov | 2024–present | 17 | 0 | 3 | 1 | 0 | 0 | 0 | 0 | 20 | 1 | 0.05 |
| 119 | (Albania) Endri Çekiçi | 2026–present | 4 | 0 | 1 | 1 | 0 | 0 | 0 | 0 | 5 | 1 | 0.2 |
| 119 | (Portugal) Bruno Silva | 2026–present | 11 | 0 | 1 | 1 | 0 | 0 | 0 | 0 | 12 | 1 | 0.08 |

=== List of hat-tricks ===
The Result column shows the Gabala score first.

As of match played 30 January 2026

Key
| (X) | Number of times player scored a hat-trick (only for players with multiple hat-tricks) |
| 4 | Player scored four goals |
| 5 | Player scored five goals |
| 6 | Player scored six goals |
| | Gabala lost the match |
| | Gabala drew the match |
| ¤ | Away matches |
| ~ | Matches at neutral venues |

| # | Player | G | Against | Res. | Date | Competition | Ref. |
|---|---|---|---|---|---|---|---|
| 1 | (Azerbaijan) Vusal Garaev | 3 | Shahdag Qusar | 6–0 | 10 October 2006 | Azerbaijan Cup | |
| 2 | (Iran) Farzad Hatami | 3 | MOIK Baku | 3–0 ¤ | 17 August 2008 | Azerbaijan Premier League | |
| 3 | (Liberia) Theo Weeks | 3 | Samtredia | 5–1 | 30 June 2016 | UEFA Europa League | |
| 4 | (France) Bagaliy Dabo | 3 | Neftçi | 8–0 ¤ | 10 September 2016 | Azerbaijan Premier League | |
| 5 | (Croatia) Filip Ozobić | 3 | Mil-Mugan | 8–0 | 29 November 2017 | Azerbaijan Cup | |
| 6 | (France) Bilel Aouacheria | 3 | Turan Tovuz | 4–0 | 25 November 2023 | Azerbaijan Premier League | |
| 7 | (Ghana) Prince Owusu | 3 | Mingəçevir | 5–1 | 29 October 2025 | Azerbaijan Cup | |
| 8 | (Republic of the Congo) Domi Massoumou | 3 | İmişli | 3–2 | 30 January 2026 | Azerbaijan Premier League | |

== Team ==
=== Record wins ===
- Record win: 8–0; v Neftchi Baku, 2016–17 Azerbaijan Premier League, 10 September 2016, & v Mil-Muğan, 2017-18 Azerbaijan Cup, 29 November 2017
- Record League win: 8–0 v Neftchi Baku, 2016–17 Azerbaijan Premier League, 10 September 2016
- Record Azerbaijan Cup win: 8–0 v Mil-Muğan, 2017-18 Azerbaijan Cup, 29 November 2017
- Record away win: 8–0 v Neftchi Baku, 2016–17 Azerbaijan Premier League, 10 September 2016
- Record home win: 8–0 v Mil-Muğan, 2017-18 Azerbaijan Cup, 29 November 2017

=== Record defeats ===
- Record defeat: 1–7

v Sabah, 2025-26 Azerbaijan Premier League, 10 March 2026

- Record League defeat: 1–7

v Sabah, 2025-26 Azerbaijan Premier League, 10 March 2026

- Record away defeat: 1–7

v Sabah, 2025-26 Azerbaijan Premier League, 10 March 2026

- Record Azerbaijan Cup defeat: 0–5

v Inter Baku, Semi-Final 1st leg, 29 April 2009

- Record home defeat: 1–4

v Karvan, Azerbaijan Premier League, 17 September 2006
v Neftchi Baku, Azerbaijan Premier League, 2 April 2007

=== Wins/draws/losses in a season ===
- Most wins in a league season: 22 – 2005–06
- Most draws in a league season: 14 – 2009–10
- Most defeats in a league season: 16 – 2006-07
- Fewest wins in a league season: 4 – 2006-07
- Fewest draws in a league season: 4 – 2006-07
- Fewest defeats in a league season: 2 – 2005–06

=== Goals ===
- Most League goals scored in a season: 72 – 2005–06
- Most Premier League goals scored in a season: 43 – 2011–12
- Fewest League goals scored in a season: 17 – 2006-07
- Most League goals conceded in a season: 48 – 2009–10
- Fewest League goals conceded in a season: 14 – 2005–06

=== Points ===
- Most points in a season:

72 in 30 matches, First Division, 2005–06

- Fewest points in a season:

16 in 24 matches, Azerbaijan Premier League, 2006-07
