= List of Gabala FC internationals =

This is a list of all full international footballers to play for Gabala FK. Players who were capped while a Gabala player are marked in bold. Players who gained their first International cap after leaving Gabala are not included.

== International representatives ==
As of match played 27 March 2026

The following list includes only players who either earnt caps whilst playing for Gabala, marked in Bold, or had caps prior to joining the club. Players who went on to represent their country after leaving Gabala, or whilst away on loan, are not included.

Key

*	Active national team player
§	Current Gabala player
‡	Active national team and current Gabala player
†	Active professional footballer

Name	Country	Overall			Gabala		
Name	Country	Years	Caps	Goals	Years	Caps	Goals
Ali Abishov	Azerbaijan	1993	1	0	2006-2008	0	0
Nadir Shukurov	Azerbaijan	2000-2001	3	4	2006-2007	0	0
Jamal Mamedov	Azerbaijan	2004	1	0	2007-2008	0	0
**Asif Mammadov**‡	Azerbaijan	2018	1	0	2007, 2015-Present	1	0
**Ngoy Bomboko**	DR Congo	2004-2007	4	0	2007	2	0
Tornike Aptsiauri	Georgia	2004-2010	5	0	2007-2010	0	0
Giorgi Gabidauri	Georgia	2004	3	1	2007-2008	0	0
Zurab Mamaladze	Georgia	2004-2009	3	0	2007-2008	0	0
Irakli Vashakidze	Georgia	1998	1	0	2007-2008	0	0
Kader Camara	Guinea	2002-2003	2	0	2007-2009, 2010-2012	0	0
Jahangir Hasanzade	Azerbaijan	1998-2007	32	0	2008-2009	0	0
**Vurğun Hüseynov**	Azerbaijan	2010-2013	15	1	2008-2009, 2011-2012	9	0
**Vüsal Hüseynov**	Azerbaijan	2003-2004	6	0	2008	0	0
Farrukh Ismayilov	Azerbaijan	1998-2007	32	5	2008-2009	0	0
Kanan Karimov	Azerbaijan	2002-2007	14	1	2008-2010	0	0
Asen Nikolov	Bulgaria	1999	1	0	2008	0	0
**Mekan Nasyrow**	Turkmenistan	2003-2009	18	4	2008-2009	0	0
**Arif Dashdemirov**	Azerbaijan	2012-2016	15	0	2009-2010, 2015-2016	0	0
Azer Mammadov	Azerbaijan	2001-2006	12	0	2009-2010	0	0
**Pāvels Doroševs**	Latvia	2012-2013	3	0	2009-2012	0	0
**Victor Comleonoc**	Moldova	2001-2009	18	0	2009	0	0
Ramin Guliyev	Azerbaijan	2005-2008	17	0	2010-2011	0	0
Nodar Mammadov	Azerbaijan	2007-2008	4	0	2010-2012	0	0
**Anar Nazirov**	Azerbaijan	2013-2016	3	0	2010-2013, 2014-2015, 2019-2021	0	0
Sergei Sokolov	Azerbaijan	2006	7	0	2010-2012	0	0
**Branimir Subašić**	Azerbaijan	2007-2013	40	7	2010-2011	0	0
**Sasha Yunisoglu**	Azerbaijan	2004-2011	29	0	2010-2012	0	0
Deon Burton	Jamaica	1997-2009	61	14	2010-2012	0	0
**Ürfan Abbasov**	Azerbaijan	2015-Present	8	1	2011-2019, 2021-2024	0	0
Elmar Bakhshiyev	Azerbaijan	2011-2014	32	0	2004-2009	0	0
**Aleksandr Chertoganov**	Azerbaijan	2006-2012	53	0	2011-2013	0	0
**Murad Hüseynov**	Azerbaijan	2011	4	0	2011-2012	0	0
Arif İsayev	Azerbaijan	2011-2013	32	5	2011-2012	0	0
**Mahir Shukurov**	Azerbaijan	2004-2014	76	4	2011-2012	0	0
Collins John	Netherlands	2004	2	0	2011	0	0
**Veseljko Trivunović**	Serbia	2010-2011	6	1	2011-2012	0	0
Al Bangura	Sierra Leone	2008-2014	3	0	2011	0	0
Rashad Abdullayev	Azerbaijan	2004-2006	10	0	2012-2013	0	0
**Oumar Kalabane**	Guinea	2000-2013	54	5	2012-2014	0	0
**Dejan Kelhar**	Slovenia	2010-2013	6	0	2012-2013	0	0
**Elnur Allahverdiyev**	Azerbaijan	2008-2014	39	0	2013, 2014	0	0
**Elvin Camalov**‡	Azerbaijan	2019-Present	21	0	2013-2019, 2026-Present	0	0
Amit Guluzade	Azerbaijan	2010	3	0	2013-2014	0	0
Nizami Hajiyev	Azerbaijan	2011-2012	2	1	2013-2014	0	0
**Volodimir Levin**	Azerbaijan	2008-2013	28	0	2013-2015	0	0
Rail Malikov	Azerbaijan	2004-2012	40	0	2013-2014	0	0
Ceyhun Sultanov	Azerbaijan	1998-2007	16	1	2013	0	0
Ifeanyi Emeghara	Nigeria	2007-2008	3	0	2013	0	0
Cristian Pulhac	Romania	2006-2008	3	0	2013-2014	0	0
Luka Žinko	Slovenia	2004-2008	3	0	2013	0	0
**Ruslan Abishov**	Azerbaijan	2009-2018	56	4	2014-2016	0	0
**Kamran Agayev**	Azerbaijan	2008-2018	79	0	2014-2015	0	0
**Ruslan Amirjanov**	Azerbaijan	2010-2014	4	0	2014-2015	0	0
**Javid Huseynov**	Azerbaijan	2008-2019	58	2	2014-2015, 2016-2019, 2020-2021	0	0
Ekigho Ehiosun	Nigeria	2011-2012	6	1	2014-2015, 2017	0	0
Andrei Cristea	Romania	2003-2010	10	0	2014-2015	0	0
Adrian Ropotan	Romania	2008-2016	7	0	2014-2015	0	0
Marat Izmailov	Russia	2001-2012	35	2	2014	0	0
**Pavol Farkaš**	Slovakia	2006-2014	3	0	2014-2015	0	0
**Davronjon Ergashev**	Tajikistan	2008-2022	72	8	2014	0	0
Vagif Javadov	Azerbaijan	2006-2014	58	9	2015	0	0
**Mahammad Mirzabeyov**	Azerbaijan	2015-2017	18	0	2015-2017	0	0
**Tellur Mutallimov**	Azerbaijan	2017-2021	7	0	2015-2017	0	0
Andriy Popovych	Azerbaijan	2011-2012	2	0	2015-2016	0	0
**Rashad Sadiqov**	Azerbaijan	2006-2015	26	0	2015-2017	0	0
**Mikhail Sivakow**	Belarus	2010-2019	25	1	2015	0	0
**Ermin Zec**	Bosnia and Herzegovina	2008-2015	10	1	2015-2016	0	0
**Sergei Zenjov**	Estonia	2008-2014	114	17	2015-2017	0	0
George Florescu	Romania	2010-2012	11	1	2015	0	0
Vojislav Stanković	Serbia	2010	1	0	2015-2016, 2016-2019	0	0
Oleksiy Antonov	Ukraine	2011-2014	2	0	2015-2016	0	0
Oleksiy Hai	Ukraine	2003-2011	29	1	2015-2016	0	0
Vitaliy Vernydub	Ukraine	2015-2018	1	0	2014	0	0
**Rashad Eyyubov**	Azerbaijan	2015-2019	7	0	2016-2017	0	0
**Ruslan Gurbanov**	Azerbaijan	2015-2018	26	1	2016-2018	0	0
**Filip Ozobić**	Croatia	2017	2	0	2016-2018	0	0
**Filip Ozobić**	Azerbaijan	2021-Present	15	1	2016-2018	0	0
**Nika Kvekveskiri**	Georgia	2015-2025	62	0	2016-2017	0	0
**Theo Weeks**	Liberia	2006-2016	25	1	2016-2017	0	0
**Pavel Pashayev**	Ukraine	2009	2	0	2016	0	0
**Pavel Pashayev**	Azerbaijan	2015-2019	21	0	2016	0	0
**Araz Abdullayev**	Azerbaijan	2008-2021	44	3	2017	0	0
**Ilgar Gurbanov**	Azerbaijan	2004-2018	30	1	2017-2019	0	0
Agil Mammadov	Azerbaijan	2015	1	0	2017, 2018-2019	0	0
Elvin Mammadov	Azerbaijan	2008-2017	39	7	2017-2018	0	0
Rasim Ramaldanov	Azerbaijan	2012-2014	17	0	2017-2021	0	0
**Sabien Lilaj**	Albania	2011-2018	19	0	2018-2019	0	0
**Rauf Aliyev**	Azerbaijan	2010-2018	47	7	2018-2019	0	0
**Tamkin Khalilzade**	Azerbaijan	2017-2022	25	3	2018	0	0
Lalawélé Atakora	Togo	2011-2019	48	2	2018-2019	0	0
Merab Gigauri	Georgia	2013	1	0	2019-2021	0	0
**Clésio**	Mozambique	2011-Present	62	9	2019-2020, 2024	0	0
**Emil Safarov**	Azerbaijan	2023-Present	5	0	2021-2024	0	0
**Omar Hani**	Jordan	2019-Present	4	0	2021-2024	0	0
**Səlahət Ağayev**‡	Azerbaijan	2010-Present	22	0	2022-2023, 2024-Present	0	0
İlkin Qırtımov	Azerbaijan	2014	5	0	2022-2024	0	0
**Shahin Shahniyarov**‡	Azerbaijan	2025-Present	1	0	2023-Present	1	0
Samuel Tetteh	Ghana	2015-2017	8	1	2023-2024	0	0
Osama Khalaila	Israel	2021-Present	1	0	2023-2024	0	0
Elvin Yunuszade	Azerbaijan	2014	3	1	2024-2025	0	0
Domi Massoumou	Congo	2023-Present	3	0	2024-2026	0	0
Jeando Fuchs	Cameroon	2018-Present	2	0	2025-2026	0	0
Adriel Ba Loua	Ivory Coast	2014-Present	1	0	2025-2026	0	0
**Rza Jafarov**	Azerbaijan	2024-Present	7	0	2026	1	0

1. The player's international record across their whole career.
2. The player's international record whilst playing for Gabala.
3. Born in England
4. Born in the Georgian SSR
5. Born in Liberia
6. Born in Russia
7. Born in Russian SFSR
8. Born in SR Bosnia and Herzegovina
9. Born in SR Serbia
10. Born in Ukraine
11. Born in Ukrainian SSR

Country	Players	Caps	Goals
Albania	1	16	0
Azerbaijan	57	1,219	69
Belarus	1	25	1
Bosnia and Herzegovina	1	10	1
Bulgaria	1	1	0
Cameroon	1	2	0
Croatia	1	2	0
DR Congo	1	4	0
Estonia	1	114	17
Ghana	1	8	1
Georgia	6	75	1
Guinea	2	56	5
Israel	1	1	0
Ivory Coast	1	1	0
Jamaica	1	61	14
Jordan	1	4	0
Latvia	1	3	0
Liberia	1	25	1
Moldova	1	18	0
Mozambique	1	62	9
Netherlands	1	2	0
Nigeria	2	9	1
Romania	4	31	1
Russia	1	35	2
Serbia	2	7	1
Sierra Leone	1	3	0
Slovakia	1	3	0
Slovenia	2	9	0
Tajikistan	1	72	8
Togo	1	48	2
Turkmenistan	1	18	4
Ukraine	4	34	1
Total	172	1,978	139
