= Zurab Mamaladze =

Georgian footballer (born 1982)

Personal information
- Full name: Zurab Mamaladze
- Date of birth: 2 October 1982 (age 44)
- Place of birth: Tbilisi, Soviet Union
- Height: 1.95 m (6 ft 5 in)
- Position: Goalkeeper

Team information
- Current team: Merani Martvili

Youth career
- Dinamo Tbilisi

Senior career*
Years	Team	Apps	(Gls)
1999–2000	Tbilisi	6	(0)
2000–2002	Dinamo Tbilisi	0	(0)
2002–2003	Milani Tsnori	25	(0)
2003	Spartaki Tbilisi	20	(0)
2004	Lokomotivi Tbilisi	10	(0)
2004–2005	Dinamo Tbilisi	14	(0)
2005–2006	Borjomi	27	(0)
2006	Chikhura Sachkhere	13	(0)
2007	Sioni Bolnisi	7	(0)
2007–2008	Gabala	21	(0)
2008	Mglebi Zugdidi	16	(0)
2009–2012	Zestaponi	29	(0)
2013	Dila Gori	1	(0)
2013	Zugdidi	16	(0)
2014–	Merani Martvili	10	(0)

International career^{‡}
?–2003	Georgia U21		
2004–2010	Georgia	3	(0)
- * Club domestic league appearances and goals as of 20 June 2014 ‡ National team caps and goals as of 16 October 2013

Zurab Mamaladze (Georgian: ზურაბ მამალაძე) (born 2 October 1982 in Tbilisi) is a Georgian footballer who plays for Merani Martvili.

Since Grigol Chanturia left for FC Sioni Bolnisi, Mamaladze was signed by FC Zestaponi in January 2009.

Mamaladze made his international debut on 21 February 2004, with his second cap coming on 9 September 2009.

== Career statistics ==
Club statistics
Season	Club	League	League		Cup		Other		Total	
Season	Club	League	App	Goals	App	Goals	App	Goals	App	Goals
1998–99	Dinamo Tbilisi	Umaglesi Liga	0	0			0	0	0	0
1999–2000	Olimpi Tbilisi	Umaglesi Liga	6	0			-		6	0
2000–01	Dinamo Tbilisi	Umaglesi Liga	0	0			-		0	0
2001–02	Dinamo Tbilisi	Umaglesi Liga	0	0			-		0	0
2002–03	Milani Tsnori	Umaglesi Liga	25	0			-		25	0
2003–04	Spartaki Tbilisi	Umaglesi Liga	20	0			-		20	0
2003–04	Lokomotivi Tbilisi	Umaglesi Liga	10	0			-		10	0
2004–05	Dinamo Tbilisi	Umaglesi Liga	14	0			5	0	19	0
2005–06	Borjomi	Umaglesi Liga	27	0			-		27	0
2006–07	Chikhura Sachkhere	Umaglesi Liga	13	0			-		13	0
2006–07	Sioni Bolnisi	Umaglesi Liga	7	0			-		7	0
2007–08	Gabala	Azerbaijan Premier League	21	0			-		21	0
2008–09	Mglebi Zugdidi	Umaglesi Liga	16	0			-		16	0
2008–09	Zestaponi	Umaglesi Liga	9	0			-		9	0
2009–10	Zestaponi	Umaglesi Liga	18	0	2	0	3	0	23	0
2010–11	Zestaponi	Umaglesi Liga	1	0	1	0	2	0	4	0
2011–12	Zestaponi	Umaglesi Liga	9	0	4	0	0	0	13	0
2012–13	Zestaponi	Umaglesi Liga	1	0	0	0	0	0	1	0
2012–13	Dila Gori	Umaglesi Liga	1	0	2	0	-		3	0
2013–14	Baia Zugdidi	Umaglesi Liga	16	0	1	0	-		17	0
2013–14	Merani Martvili	Umaglesi Liga	10	0	2	0	-		12	0
Total	Georgia		203	0	12	0	10	0	215	0
Total	Azerbaijan		21	0			-		21	0
Total			224	0	12	0	10	0	246	0

== National team statistics ==
As of 16 October 2013

Georgian national team
Year	Apps	Goals
2004	1	0
2009	2	0
Total	3	0
