= Erivelto (footballer, born 1982) =

Brazilian footballer

Personal information
- Full name: Erivelto Alixandrino da Silva
- Date of birth: 7 April 1982 (age 44)
- Place of birth: Guarulhos, Brazil
- Height: 1.84 m (6 ft 0 in)
- Position: Forward

Senior career*
Years	Team	Apps	(Gls)
2004–2005	SFC Opava	2	(1)
2007	FK Srem		
2007	Inter de Limeira		
2008–2009	Rio Branco-SP		
2008	→ Gabala (loan)	2	(0)
2009	XV de Jaú		
2009	Flamengo		
2010	Canedense		
2010	Náutico	2	(0)
2010	Brasiliense	6	(2)
2011	Trindade	9	(2)
2012	Fluminense	5	(0)
2012	Botafogo-PB		
2013	América-TO	0	(0)
- * Club domestic league appearances and goals

Erivelto Alixandrino da Silva (born 7 April 1982) is a Brazilian former professional footballer who played as forward.

== Career ==
Erivelto was born in Guarulhos, Brazil. In the 2004–05 season he played with SFC Opava in the Gambrinus Liga, Czech top tier. Later he played in the Serbian First League with FK Srem during the second half of the 2006–07 season.

Erivelto joined Gabala in the Azerbaijan Premier League on loan for the latter half of the 2007–08 season, appearing twice in the league.

In September 2010 Erivelto signed a contract with Brasiliense until the May 2011, before then moving to Trindade in 2011. In January 2012 Erivelto joined Fluminense, but less than two months later he moved to Botafogo-PB, and then onto América in January 2013 before cancelling his contract and retiring from the game to take an administrative job in his home town of Guarulhos in March of the same year.

== Career statistics ==
Appearances and goals by club, season and competition
Club	Season	League			Cup		Continental		Total	
Club	Season	Division	Apps	Goals	Apps	Goals	Apps	Goals	Apps	Goals
Gabala	2007–08	Azerbaijan Premier League	2	0			—		2	0
Career total			2	0			-		2	0
