= Giorgi Gabidauri =

Georgian footballer

Personal information
- Date of birth: 6 December 1979 (age 46)
- Height: 1.78 m (5 ft 10 in)
- Position: Midfielder

Senior career*
Years	Team	Apps	(Gls)
1995–1998	Kodako Tbilisi	59	(5)
1998–1999	Gantiadi Kaspi	24	(4)
2000	Dinamo Tbilisi	2	(0)
2000	Torpedo Kutaisi	5	(2)
2001	Dinamo Tbilisi	16	(2)
2002	Merani-91 Tbilisi	11	(0)
2002–2003	Kolkheti-1913 Poti	25	(1)
2003–2004	Sioni Bolnisi	20	(0)
2004–2005	Anorthosis Famagusta	22	(3)
2006	Panachaiki	14	(2)
2006–2007	Shakhter Karagandy	29	(1)
2007–2008	Gabala	19	(0)
2008	Olimpi Rustavi	12	(2)
2009	Meskheti Akhaltsikhe	2	(0)
2009–2012	Hapoel Bnei Lod	79	(6)
2012–2013	Maccabi Umm al-Fahm	34	(2)
2013–2014	Hapoel Bnei Lod	12	(0)
2014–	F.C. Kafr Qasim	0	(0)

International career
2004	Georgia	3	(1)
- * Club domestic league appearances and goals as of 3 March 2014

Giorgi Gabidauri (Georgian: გიორგი ჯაბადარი; born 6 December 1979) is a Georgian professional football player.

== Career statistics ==
As of 3 March 2014

Club statistics
Season	Club	League	League		Cup		Europe		Total	
Season	Club	League	App	Goals	App	Goals	App	Goals	App	Goals
1999–2000	Dinamo Tbilisi	Umaglesi Liga	2	0			0	0	2	0
2000–01	Torpedo Kutaisi	Umaglesi Liga	5	2			0	0	5	2
2000–01	Dinamo Tbilisi	Umaglesi Liga	10	1			—		10	1
2001–02	Merani-91 Tbilisi	Umaglesi Liga	11	0			—		11	0
2001–02	Dinamo Tbilisi	Umaglesi Liga	5	0			—		5	0
2002–03	Kolkheti-1913 Poti	Umaglesi Liga	25	1			—		25	1
2003–04	Anorthosis Famagusta	Cypriot First Division	10	2			0	0	10	2
2004–05	Anorthosis Famagusta	Cypriot First Division	9	1			—		9	1
2005–06	Anorthosis Famagusta	Cypriot First Division	2	0			0	0	2	0
2005–06	Panachaiki	Beta Ethniki	14	2			—		14	2
2006	Shakhter Karagandy	Kazakhstan Premier League	17	1			—		17	1
2007	Shakhter Karagandy	Kazakhstan Premier League	12	0			—		12	0
2007–08	Gabala	Azerbaijan Premier League	19	0			—		19	0
2008–09	Olimpi Rustavi	Umaglesi Liga	13	2			—		13	2
2008–09	Meskheti Akhaltsikhe	Umaglesi Liga	10	1			—		10	1
2009–10	Hapoel Bnei Lod	Liga Leumit	23	2			—		23	2
2010–11	Hapoel Bnei Lod	Liga Leumit	27	1			—		27	1
2011–12	Hapoel Bnei Lod	Liga Leumit	30	3			—		30	3
2012–13	Maccabi Umm al-Fahm	Liga Leumit	34	2			—		34	2
2013–14	Hapoel Bnei Lod	Liga Leumit	12	0	1	0	—		13	0
Total	Georgia		81	7			0	0	81	7
Total	Cyprus		21	0			0	0	21	0
Total	Greece		14	2			-	-	14	2
Total	Kazakhstan		29	1			-	-	29	1
Total	Azerbaijan		19	0			-	-	19	0
Total	Israel		127	8	1	0	-	-	128	8
Total			291	21	1	0	0	0	292	21
