= Vladimir Țaranu =

Moldovan footballer

Personal information
- Date of birth: 27 July 1982 (age 44)
- Height: 1.84 m (6 ft 0 in)
- Position: Forward

Senior career*
Years	Team	Apps	(Gls)
2005	Tiligul-Tiras Tiraspol	11	(1)
2006–2007	Nistru Otaci	54	(18)
2008	Gabala	12	(4)
2008	Nistru Otaci	11	(3)
2009	Mughan	11	(4)
2009–2011	Iskra-Stal	46	(5)
- * Club domestic league appearances and goals as of 17 December 2013

Vladimir Țaranu (born 27 June 1982) is a Moldovan footballer who last played as a forward for Iskra-Stal.

In February 2009 Țaranu re-joined the Azerbaijan Premier League, signing for Mughan for the remainder of the seasons, and was the clubs joint top goalscorer that season with Farid Guliyev on 4 goals.

== Career statistics ==
Club performance			League		Cup		Continental		Total	
Season	Club	League	Apps	Goals	Apps	Goals	Apps	Goals	Apps	Goals
2005-06	Tiligul-Tiras Tiraspol	Moldovan National Division	11	1			2	0	13	1
2005-06	Nistru Otaci	Moldovan National Division	3	0			—		3	0
2006-07	Nistru Otaci	Moldovan National Division	34	16			2	0	36	16
2007-08	Nistru Otaci	Moldovan National Division	17	2	1	0	2	0	20	2
2007-08	Gabala	Azerbaijan Premier League	12	4			—		12	4
2008-09	Nistru Otaci	Moldovan National Division	11	3			—		11	3
2008-09	Mughan	Azerbaijan Premier League	11	4			—		11	4
2009-10	Iskra-Stal	Moldovan National Division	21	4	4	0	0	0	25	4
2010-11	Iskra-Stal	Moldovan National Division	25	1	2	0	2	0	29	1
Total	Moldova		122	27			8	0	130	27
Total	Azerbaijan		23	8			-		23	8
Career total			145	35			8	0	153	35

== Honours ==
- Moldovan Cup: 2010–11
