= Tornike Aptsiauri =

Georgian professional football player

Personal information
- Date of birth: 29 November 1979 (age 46)
- Place of birth: Tbilisi, Georgian SSR
- Height: 1.77 m (5 ft 10 in)
- Position: Midfielder

Senior career*
Years	Team	Apps	(Gls)
1996–1998	Lokomotivi Tbilisi	6	(1)
1998–1999	Dinamo-2 Tbilisi	14	(2)
1999–2000	Tbilisi	1	(0)
2000	Lokomotivi Tbilisi	2	(0)
2001–2002	Dinamo Tbilisi	16	(1)
2002–2003	Merani-Olimpi Tbilisi	18	(2)
2003–2005	Tbilisi	61	(5)
2006	Borjomi	19	(5)
2006–2007	Olimpi Rustavi	25	(4)
2007–2009	Gabala	46	(7)
2009–2013	Zestaponi	114	(11)
2013–2014	Sioni Bolnisi	29	(2)

International career
2004–2010	Georgia	5	(0)
- * Club domestic league appearances and goals

Tornike Aptsiauri (Georgian: თორნიკე აფციაური; born 29 November 1979) is a Georgian former professional footballer who played as a midfielder.

== Career statistics ==
As of match played 24 October 2014

Appearances and goals by club, season and competition
Club	Season	League			Cup		Europe		Total	
Club	Season	Division	Apps	Goals	Apps	Goals	Apps	Goals	Apps	Goals
Lokomotivi Tbilisi	1996–97	Umaglesi Liga	5	1			–		5	1
Lokomotivi Tbilisi	1997–98	Umaglesi Liga	1	0			–		1	0
Lokomotivi Tbilisi	Total		6	1			0	0	6	1
Dinamo-2 Tbilisi	1998–99	Pirveli Liga	14	2			–		14	2
Norchi Dinamo Tbilisi	1999–2000	Umaglesi Liga	1	0			–		1	0
Lokomotivi Tbilisi	2000–01	Umaglesi Liga	2	0			0	0	2	0
Dinamo Tbilisi	2000–01	Umaglesi Liga	10	0			–		10	0
Dinamo Tbilisi	2001–02	Umaglesi Liga	6	1			1	0	7	1
Dinamo Tbilisi	Total		16	1			1	0	17	1
Merani Tbilisi	2002–03	Umaglesi Liga	8	2			–		8	2
Metalurgi Rustavi	2003–04	Umaglesi Liga	30	4			4	0	34	4
Metalurgi Rustavi	2004–05	Umaglesi Liga	23	1			–		23	1
Metalurgi Rustavi	2005–06	Umaglesi Liga	8	0			–		8	0
Metalurgi Rustavi	Total		61	5			4	0	65	5
Borjomi	2005–06	Umaglesi Liga	19	5			–		19	5
Olimpi Rustavi	2006–07	Umaglesi Liga	25	4			–		25	4
Gabala	2007–08	Azerbaijan Premier League	24	4	12	0	—		24	4
Gabala	2008–09	Azerbaijan Premier League	22	3	12	0	—		22	3
Gabala	Total		46	7	12	0	0	0	58	7
Zestaponi	2009–10	Umaglesi Liga	30	2	3	1	3	1	36	4
Zestaponi	2010–11	Umaglesi Liga	34	5	4	1	4	0	42	6
Zestaponi	2011–12	Umaglesi Liga	28	3	7	1	6	0	41	4
Zestaponi	2012–13	Umaglesi Liga	22	1	1	0	2	0	25	1
Zestaponi	Total		114	11	15	3	15	1	144	15
Sioni	2013–14	Umaglesi Liga	23	2	3	1	–		26	3
Sioni	2014–15	Umaglesi Liga	6	0	0	0	–		6	0
Sioni	Total		29	2	3	1	0	0	32	3
Career total			338	39	30	4	20	1	391	44

== Honours ==
Dinamo-2 Tbilisi

- Pirveli Liga: 1998–99 Regionuli Liga (East, B zone)

Olimpi Rustavi

- Umaglesi Liga: 2006–07

Zestaponi

- Umaglesi Liga: 2010–11, 2011–12
- Georgian Cup runner-up: 2011–12
- Georgian Super Cup: 2011, 2012
