= Irakli Vashakidze =

Georgian footballer (born 1976)

Personal information
- Date of birth: 13 March 1976 (age 50)
- Place of birth: Tbilisi, Georgia
- Height: 1.89 m (6 ft 2 1/2 in)
- Position: Defender

Team information
- Current team: Former Soccer player

Senior career*
Years	Team	Apps	(Gls)
1993–1995	Samtredia	3	(0)
1995–1997	Morkinali Tbilisi	65	(8)
1997	WIT Georgia	15	(2)
1998	Torpedo Kutaisi	21	(3)
1999–2001	Dinamo Tbilisi	57	(2)
2001	Torpedo Kutaisi	7	(1)
2001–2003	Dinamo Tbilisi	48	(3)
2003–2004	Lokomotivi Tbilisi	31	(7)
2004	Aris	3	(0)
2005	Sioni Bolnisi	14	(1)
2005	Tbilisi	6	(0)
2006–2007	Turan Tovuz	37	(1)
2007–2008	Gabala	24	(1)
2008	Merani Martvili	12	(0)
2009	Sioni Bolnisi	28	(0)

International career^{‡}
1998	Georgia	1	(0)
- * Club domestic league appearances and goals as of 29 May 2015 ‡ National team caps and goals as of 29 May 2015

Irakli Vashakidze (born 13 March 1976) is a Georgian former professional football player.

== Career statistics ==
Club statistics
Season	Club	League	League		Cup		Europe		Total	
Season	Club	League	App	Goals	App	Goals	App	Goals	App	Goals
1993–94	Samtredia	Georgian Premier League	3	0			-		3	0
1994–95	Samtredia	Georgian Premier League	0	0			-		0	0
1995–96	Morkinali Tbilisi	Pirveli Liga	31	4			-		31	4
1996–97	Morkinali Tbilisi	Pirveli Liga	34	4			-		34	4
1997–98	WIT Georgia	Georgian Premier League	15	2			-		15	2
1997–98	Torpedo Kutaisi	Georgian Premier League	14	0			3	0	17	0
1998–99	Torpedo Kutaisi	Georgian Premier League	7	3			-		7	3
1998–99	Dinamo Tbilisi	Georgian Premier League	26	1			-		30	1
1999–2000	Dinamo Tbilisi	Georgian Premier League	26	1			2	0	30	1
2000–01	Dinamo Tbilisi	Georgian Premier League	17	1			-		17	1
2000–01	Torpedo Kutaisi	Georgian Premier League	7	1	4	0	-		7	1
2001–02	Dinamo Tbilisi	Georgian Premier League	27	2			2	0	31	2
2002–03	Dinamo Tbilisi	Georgian Premier League	21	1	9	3	4	0	34	1
2003–04	Lokomotivi Tbilisi	Georgian Premier League	31	7	4	0	-		31	7
2004–05	Aris	Super League Greece	3	0			-		3	0
2004–05	Sioni Bolnisi	Georgian Premier League	14	1			-		14	1
2005–06	Tbilisi	Georgian Premier League	6	0			-		6	0
2005–06	Turan Tovuz	Azerbaijan Premier League	13	0			-		13	0
2006–07	Turan Tovuz	Azerbaijan Premier League	24	1			-		24	1
2007–08	Gabala	Azerbaijan Premier League	24	1	8	0	-		24	1
2008–09	Merani Martvili	Georgian Premier League	12	0	4	0	-		12	0
2008–09	Sioni Bolnisi	Georgian Premier League	14	0			-		14	0
2009–10	Sioni Bolnisi	Georgian Premier League	14	0	4	0	-		18	0
Total	Georgia		319	28	33	3	11	0	363	31
Total	Greece		3	0	0	0	-		3	0
Total	Azerbaijan		61	2	0	0	-		61	2
Total			383	30	33	3	11	0	427	33

== Achievements ==
- Umaglesi Liga:
- 1998–1999 Champion (Dinamo Tbilisi),
- 1999-2000 3rd place (Dinamo Tbilisi),
- 2000–2001 Champion (Torpedo Kutaisi),
- 2001-2002 3rd place (Dinamo Tbilisi)
- 2002–2003 Champion (Dinamo Tbilisi)
- 2013-2014 Champion (Dinamo Tbilisi) (as Sport Director)
- Georgian Super Cup: 2014 (as Sport Director of Dinamo Tbilisi)
- Georgian Cup: 2003
- Georgian Cup: 2001
- Georgian Super Cup: 1999
