= Anatoli Tebloyev =

Russian footballer

Personal information
- Full name: Anatoli Grigoryevich Tebloyev
- Date of birth: July 16, 1974 (age 52)
- Place of birth: Arkhangelsk, Russian SFSR
- Height: 1.90 m (6 ft 3 in)
- Positions: Midfielder; defender

Senior career*
Years	Team	Apps	(Gls)
1993	FC Irtysh Omsk	12	(0)
1994–1997	FC Iriston Vladikavkaz	119	(9)
1998	FC Lokomotiv-Taim Mineralnye Vody	29	(0)
1999	FC Volgar-Gazprom Astrakhan	37	(2)
2000–2001	FC Anzhi Makhachkala	32	(0)
2001–2002	FC Alania Vladikavkaz	4	(0)
2002	Volgar Astrakhan	9	(1)
2004	FC Mashuk-KMV Pyatigorsk	15	(0)
2004–2005	Neftchi Baku	31	(0)
2005–2006	Mashuk-KMV Pyatigorsk	18	(1)
2006	FC Oryol	21	(0)
2007	FC Znamya Truda Orekhovo-Zuyevo	23	(3)
2007–2009	Gabala	27	(3)
- * Club domestic league appearances and goals

Anatoli Grigoryevich Tebloyev (Russian: Анатолий Григорьевич Теблоев; born July 16, 1974) is a Russian retired professional footballer. His last club was Gabala.

== Career statistics ==
Club statistics
Season	Club	League	League		Cup		Other		Total	
Season	Club	League	App	Goals	App	Goals	App	Goals	App	Goals
Russia			League		Russian Cup		Europe		Total	
1993	Irtysh Omsk	FNL	12	0			-		12	0
1994	Iriston Vladikavkaz	Russian Second Division	23	1			-		23	1
1995	Iriston Vladikavkaz	Russian Second Division	39	0			-		39	0
1996	Iriston Vladikavkaz	Russian Second Division	14	0			-		14	0
1997	Iriston Vladikavkaz	Russian Amateur Football League	43	8			-		43	8
1998	Lokomotiv-Taym Mineralnye Vody	Russian Second Division	29	0			-		29	0
1999	Volgar-Gazprom Astrakhan	FNL	37	2			-		37	2
2000	Anzhi Makhachkala	RFPL	24	0	4	0	-		36	0
2001	Anzhi Makhachkala	RFPL	8	0	4	0	-		36	0
2001	Alania Vladikavkaz	RFPL	2	0			-		2	0
2002	Alania Vladikavkaz	RFPL	2	0			-		2	0
2002	Volgar Astrakhan	FNL	9	1			-		9	1
2004	Mashuk-KMV Pyatigorsk	Russian Second Division	15	0			-		15	0
Azerbaijan			League		Azerbaijan Cup		Europe		Total	
2004–05	Neftchi Baku	Azerbaijan Premier League	31	0			2	0	33	0
Russia			League		Russian Cup		Europe		Total	
2005	Mashuk-KMV Pyatigorsk	Russian Second Division	14	1			-		14	1
2006	Mashuk-KMV Pyatigorsk	FNL	4	0			-		4	0
2006	Oryol	FNL	21	0			-		21	0
2007	Znamya Truda	Russian Second Division	23	3			-		23	3
Azerbaijan			League		Azerbaijan Cup		Europe		Total	
2007–08	Gabala	Azerbaijan Premier League	13	0			-		13	0
2008–09	Gabala	Azerbaijan Premier League	14	3			-		14	3
Total	Russia		319	16	0	0	0	0	319	16
Total	Azerbaijan		58	3			2	0	60	3
Total			377	19	0	0	2	0	379	19

== Honours ==
- Neftchi Baku
  - Azerbaijan Premier League champion: 2004–05
