= Ngoy Bomboko =

Congolese footballer (1977–2024)

Personal information
- Full name: David Mbomboko Fiston Ngoy
- Date of birth: 21 May 1977
- Place of birth: Zaire (now DR Congo)
- Date of death: 4 June 2024 (aged 47)
- Place of death: Lubumbashi, DR Congo
- Height: 1.77 m (5 ft 10 in)
- Position: Forward

Senior career*
| Years | Team | Apps | (Gls) |
| 1997–2012 | TP Mazembe | | |
| 2007 | → Gabala (loan) | 11 | (4) |

International career
| 2004–2007 | DR Congo | 4 | (0) |
- * Club domestic league appearances and goals

David Mbomboko Fiston Ngoy (21 May 1977 – 4 June 2024) was a Congolese professional footballer who played as a forward. He spent the majority of his career at TP Mazembe.

== Club career ==
Bomboko joined Azerbaijani Premier League side Gabala SC on loan for the first half of the 2007-08 season, scoring 4 goals in 11 appearances.

== International career ==
Bomboko was part of the DR Congo national team at the 2004 African Nations Cup, which finished bottom of its group in the first round of competition, thus failing to secure qualification for the quarter-finals.

== Death ==
Bomboko died on the night of 4 June 2024, at the age of 47, after a fire erupted at a bar in Lubumbashi.

== Career statistics ==
Appearances and goals by national team and year
| National team | Year | Apps | Goals |
|---|---|---|---|
| Congo DR | 2004 | 2 | 0 |
| Congo DR | 2005 | 0 | 0 |
| Congo DR | 2006 | 0 | 0 |
| Congo DR | 2007 | 2 | 0 |
| Total | | 4 | 0 |

== Honours ==
TP Mazembe

- Linafoot: 2006, 2007, 2009
- CAF Champions League: 2009, 2010
- CAF Super Cup: 2010, 2011
