= Kader Camara =

Guinean footballer (born 1982)

Personal information
- Full name: Abdoul Kader Camara
- Date of birth: 18 March 1982 (age 44)
- Place of birth: Conakry, Guinea
- Height: 1.78 m (5 ft 10 in)
- Position: Midfielder

Youth career
- Vasco de Conakry
- Athlético de Coléah
- 1998–2000: Vitesse

Senior career*
Years	Team	Apps	(Gls)
2000–2002	RC Harelbeke	12	(0)
2002–2004	Cercle Brugge	52	(0)
2004–2006	Beringen-Heusden-Zolder	42	(0)
2006–2007	Dessel Sport	23	(0)
2007–2009	Gabala	40	(1)
2009	Olimpik-Shuvalan	14	(0)
2010–2012	Gabala	48	(0)
2013	Visé	9	(0)
2013–2014	UR Namur		
2014–2015	Turkania Faymonville		
2016	Etzella Ettelbruck	9	(0)

International career
2004	Guinea	5	(1)
- * Club domestic league appearances and goals

Kader Camara (born 18 March 1982) is a Guinean former professional footballer who played as a midfielder.

== Club career ==
In 2003, Camara was part of Cercle Brugge, the team that became Belgian Second Division champions, thus achieving promotion to the highest level of Belgian football. Among Camara's for teams are Vitesse (as youth player), RC Harelbeke, Dessel Sport and Beringen-Heusden-Zolder. Also, he played five seasons for Azerbaijan Premier League side Gabala from July 2007.

Camara returned to Gabala following, six months with Olimpik-Shuvalan, in February 2010.

== International career ==
Camara was part of the Guinean 2004 African Nations Cup team, who finished second in their group in the first round of competition, before losing in the quarter-finals to Mali. He played 12 minutes of the 1-1 group game against Rwanda, coming on as a substitute for Abdoul Salam Sow.

== Career statistics ==
Appearances and goals by club, season and competition
Club	Season	League			Cup		Europe		Total	
Club	Season	Division	Apps	Goals	Apps	Goals	Apps	Goals	Apps	Goals
Cercle Brugge	2002–03	Belgian Second Division	30	0	3	0	–		33	0
Cercle Brugge	2003–04	Belgian Pro League	22	0	1	0	–		23	0
Cercle Brugge	Total		52	0	4	0	0	0	56	0
Beringen-Heusden-Zolder	2004–05	Belgian Second Division	27	0			–		27	0
Beringen-Heusden-Zolder	2005–06	Belgian Second Division	15	0			–		15	0
Beringen-Heusden-Zolder	Total		42	0			0	0	42	0
Olympic de Charleroi-Marchienne	2005–06	Belgian Third Division					–			
Dessel	2006–07	Belgian Second Division	23	2			–		23	2
Gabala	2007–08	Azerbaijan Premier League	18	0			–		18	0
Gabala	2008–09	Azerbaijan Premier League	22	1			–		22	1
Gabala	Total		40	1			0	0	40	1
Olimpik-Shuvalan	2009–10	Azerbaijan Premier League	14	0			–		14	0
Gabala	2009–10	Azerbaijan Premier League	13	0			–		13	0
Gabala	2010–11	Azerbaijan Premier League	25	0	0	0	–		25	0
Gabala	2011–12	Azerbaijan Premier League	10	0	0	0	–		10	0
Gabala	Total		45	0			0	0	45	0
Visé	2012–13	Belgian Second Division	9	0	0	0	–		9	0
Career total			228	1	4	0	0	0	232	1
