= Vitali Balamestny =

Russian footballer

Personal information
- Full name: Vitali Ivanovich Balamestny
- Date of birth: 28 July 1980 (age 46)
- Height: 1.73 m (5 ft 8 in)
- Positions: Striker; midfielder

Senior career*
Years	Team	Apps	(Gls)
2002	Krasnodar-2000	9	(0)
2002	Zhemchuzhina Sochi	11	(8)
2003	Zhemchuzhina Budyonnovsk	36	(15)
2005	Nizhny Novgorod	25	(3)
2006	Dynamo Stavropol	25	(6)
2006–2008	Gabala	30	(11)
2008–2009	Krasnodar	33	(10)
2009	Standard Baku	9	(3)
2010	Chernomorets Novorossiysk	10	(3)
2011	Gornyak Uchaly	13	(0)
2012–2013	Neftchala		(2)
- * Club domestic league appearances and goals

Vitali Ivanovich Balamestny (Russian: Виталий Иванович Баламестный; born 28 July 1980) is a Russian former professional footballer who played as a striker or midfielder.

== Career ==
During Gabala's 3–1 defeat to Simurq on 7 April 2007, Balamestny scored Gabala's 100th goal.

He played in the Russian Football National League for FC Krasnodar in 2009.

== Career statistics ==
As of 24 April 2013

Appearances and goals by club, season and competition
Club	Season	League			Cup		Other		Total	
Club	Season	Division	Apps	Goals	Apps	Goals	Apps	Goals	Apps	Goals
Gabala	2006–07	Azerbaijan Premier League	12	3			—		12	3
Gabala	2007–08	Azerbaijan Premier League	18	8			—		18	8
Gabala	Total		30	11					30	11
Krasnodar	2008	Russian Second Division South					—			
Krasnodar	2009	Russian First Division	15	2			—		15	2
Krasnodar	Total									
Standard Baku	2009–10	Azerbaijan Premier League	9	3	1	0	—		10	3
Chernomorets Novorossiysk	2010	Russian Second Division South	10	3	—		—		10	3
Gornyak Uchaly	2011–12	Russian Second Ural-Povolzhye	13	0	1	0	—		14	0
Neftchala	2012–13	Azerbaijan First Division		2	1	0	—		1	0
Career total			77	21	3	0	0	0	80	21

== Honours ==
Chernomorets Novorossiysk

- Russian Professional Football League South: 2010
