= FC Mglebi Zugdidi =

- Full name: FC Mglebi Zugdidi
- Founded: 2005; 21 years ago
- Dissolved: 2006; 20 years ago
- Ground: Zugdidi, Georgia
Home colours

FC Mglebi Zugdidi were a Georgian football club based in Zugdidi.

In July 2006, FC Mglebi Zugdidi and FC Zugdidi merged.

== Seasons ==
Season	League	Pos.	Pl.	W	D	L	GF	GA	P	Cup	Notes	Manager
2005–06	Regionuli Liga West											

== See also ==
- FC Dinamo Zugdidi
- FC Zugdidi
