= 1999–2000 Umaglesi Liga =

Umaglesi Liga
- Season: 1999–2000
- Dates: 12 August 1999 – 30 May 2000
- Champions: Torpedo Kutaisi; 1st Georgian title
- Relegated: Samgurali Tskaltubo; FC Tbilisi; Arsenali Tbilisi; Kolkheti Khobi
- Champions League: Torpedo Kutaisi
- UEFA Cup: WIT Georgia; Locomotive Tbilisi
- Intertoto Cup: Dinamo Tbilisi
- Matches played: 224
- Goals scored: 570 (2.54 per match)
- Top goalscorer: Zurab Ionanidze (24)
- Biggest home win: Dinamo Tbilisi 7–1 Samgurali; Dinamo Batumi 6–0 Iberia
- Biggest away win: Kolkheti Khobi 0–7 Locomotive
- Highest scoring: TSU 7–2 Kolkheti Khobi

The 1999–2000 Umaglesi Liga was the eleventh season of top-tier football in Georgia. It began on 12 August 1999 and ended on 30 May 2000. Dinamo Tbilisi were the defending champions.

== Locations ==
Location of teams in 1999–2000 Umaglesi Liga

== First stage ==
=== Group A ===
Pos	Team	Pld	W	D	L	GF	GA	GD	Pts	Qualification
1	Dinamo Tbilisi	14	11	1	2	38	12	+26	34	Qualification to Championship group
2	Dinamo Batumi	14	6	7	1	15	4	+11	25	Qualification to Championship group
3	WIT Georgia	14	6	5	3	20	12	+8	23	Qualification to Championship group
4	Sioni Bolnisi	14	6	3	5	13	19	−6	21	Qualification to Championship group
5	Locomotive Tbilisi	14	5	3	6	21	19	+2	18	Qualification to Relegation group
6	FC Tbilisi (Note: FC Tbilisi were previously called Dinamo-2 Tbilisi)	14	3	4	7	21	31	−10	13	Qualification to Relegation group
7	Samgurali Tskaltubo	14	3	2	9	9	27	−18	11	Qualification to Relegation group
8	Arsenali Tbilisi	14	2	3	9	10	23	−13	9	Qualification to Relegation group

Source: rsssf.org
Rules for classification: 1st points; 2nd matches won; 3rd head-to-head

==== Results ====
Home \ Away	ARS	DBA	DIN	LOC	SMG	SIO	TBI	WIT
Arsenali Tbilisi		0–1	2–0	0–4	2–1	0–1	1–1	1–2
Dinamo Batumi	1–0		1–0	4–1	0–0	4–0	2–0	0–0
Dinamo Tbilisi	1–1	2–1		4–0	7–1	3–0	3–2	4–1
Locomotive Tbilisi	2–2	0–0	1–2		2–0	0–1	2–1	1–1
Samgurali Tskaltubo	1–0	0–0	1–2	0–3		1–0	1–0	0–1
Sioni Bolnisi	1–0	0–0	1–3	1–0	2–0		2–2	0–0
FC Tbilisi	3–1	1–1	0–6	0–4	5–2	3–4		2–1
WIT Georgia	4–0	0–0	0–1	3–1	3–1	3–0	1–1	

Source: rsssf.org
Legend: Blue = home team win; Yellow = draw; Red = away team win.

=== Group B ===
Pos	Team	Pld	W	D	L	GF	GA	GD	Pts	Qualification
1	Torpedo Kutaisi	14	11	3	0	33	5	+28	36	Qualification to Championship group
2	Kolkheti-1913 Poti	14	8	1	5	19	15	+4	25	Qualification to Championship group
3	Dila Gori	14	6	2	6	19	24	−5	20	Qualification to Championship group
4	Iberia Samtredia	14	5	3	6	9	20	−11	18	Qualification to Championship group
5	Gorda Rustavi	14	5	1	8	17	18	−1	16	Qualification to Relegation group
6	TSU Tbilisi	14	4	4	6	13	18	−5	16	Qualification to Relegation group
7	Merani-91 Tbilisi	14	3	6	5	14	15	−1	15	Qualification to Relegation group
8	Kolkheti Khobi	14	2	4	8	15	24	−9	10	Qualification to Relegation group

Source: rsssf.org
Rules for classification: 1st points; 2nd matches won; 3rd head-to-head

==== Results ====
Home \ Away	DIL	GOR	IBS	KKH	KOL	MER	TKU	TSU
Dila Gori		1–2	2–0	1–0	3–0	3–2	0–5	1–1
Gorda Rustavi	2–0		4–0	4–1	0–1	0–0	0–2	3–1
Iberia Samtredia	2–1	1–0		2–1	1–0	1–1	0–3	0–1
Kolkheti Khobi	2–3	5–1	0–1		0–3	1–1	1–2	0–0
Kolkheti-1913 Poti	3–0	2–0	1–0	2–3		1–0	0–0	1–0
Merani-91 Tbilisi	3–1	2–1	0–0	0–0	1–2		0–1	1–1
Torpedo Kutaisi	2–2	1–0	5–0	0–0	4–1	3–1		3–0
TSU Tbilisi	0–1	1–0	1–1	4–1	3–2	0–2	0–2	

Source: rsssf.org
Legend: Blue = home team win; Yellow = draw; Red = away team win.

== Second stage ==
=== Championship playoff ===
Teams take half their totals (rounded) to spring playoffs.

Team	Points
Torpedo Kutaisi	18
WIT Georgia	12
Dinamo Tbilisi	17
Dinamo Batumi	13
Kolkheti-1913 Poti	13
Sioni Bolnisi	11
Iberia Samtredia	9
Dila Gori	10

Pos	Team	Pld	W	D	L	GF	GA	GD	Pts	Qualification
1	Torpedo Kutaisi (C)	14	8	4	2	37	11	+26	46	Qualification for the Champions League second qualifying round
2	WIT Georgia	14	8	5	1	15	7	+8	41	Qualification for the UEFA Cup qualifying round
3	Dinamo Tbilisi	14	5	9	0	19	4	+15	41	Qualification for the Intertoto Cup first round
4	Dinamo Batumi	14	8	2	4	22	10	+12	39	
5	Kolkheti-1913 Poti	14	7	3	4	18	10	+8	37	
6	Sioni Bolnisi	14	3	1	10	14	31	−17	21	
7	Iberia Samtredia	14	2	2	10	6	29	−23	17	
8	Dila Gori	14	2	0	12	9	38	−29	16	

Source: rsssf.org
Rules for classification: 1st points; 2nd matches won; 3rd head-to-head
(C) Champions

==== Results ====
Home \ Away	DIL	DBA	DIN	IBS	KOL	TKU	SIO	WIT
Dila Gori		0–1	0–3	3–0	0–2	0–4	1–0	0–2
Dinamo Batumi	4–0		0–0	6–0	2–0	2–1	3–0	0–1
Dinamo Tbilisi	6–1	0–0		2–0	1–1	1–1	3–0	0–0
Iberia Samtredia	2–1	0–2	0–0		1–0	0–3	0–1	0–1
Kolkheti-1913 Poti	3–1	1–0	0–0	1–0		2–1	5–0	2–0
Torpedo Kutaisi	4–1	4–0	0–0	5–0	3–1		6–1	0–0
Sioni Bolnisi	5–0	1–2	0–2	2–2	1–0	2–4		1–2
WIT Georgia	2–1	2–0	1–1	2–1	0–0	1–1	1–0	

Source: rsssf.org
Legend: Blue = home team win; Yellow = draw; Red = away team win.

=== Relegation playoff ===
Pos	Team	Pld	W	D	L	GF	GA	GD	Pts	Qualification or relegation
9	Merani-91 Tbilisi	14	9	4	1	18	5	+13	39	
10	Locomotive Tbilisi	14	8	3	3	22	8	+14	36	Qualification for the UEFA Cup qualifying round
11	TSU Tbilisi	14	9	0	5	26	15	+11	35	
12	Gorda Rustavi	14	8	2	4	25	10	+15	34	
13	Samgurali Tskaltubo (R)	14	8	3	3	17	8	+9	33	Relegation to Pirveli Liga
14	FC Tbilisi (Note: FC Tbilisi was previously called Dinamo-2 Tbilisi) (R)	14	3	2	9	12	26	−14	18	Relegation to Pirveli Liga
15	Arsenali Tbilisi (R)	14	3	0	11	11	27	−16	14	Relegation to Pirveli Liga
16	Kolkheti Khobi (R)	14	1	0	13	13	45	−32	8	Relegation to Pirveli Liga

Source: rsssf.org
Rules for classification: 1st points; 2nd matches won; 3rd head-to-head
(R) Relegated

==== Results ====
Home \ Away	ARS	GOR	KKH	LOC	MER	SMG	TBI	TSU
Arsenali Tbilisi		0–4	4–2	0–1	0–2	2–1	4–2	0–2
Gorda Rustavi	3–0		2–0	1–0	1–1	1–2	2–0	2–0
Kolkheti Khobi	2–1	1–4		0–7	1–2	0–2	1–2	2–4
Locomotive Tbilisi	1–0	2–1	4–1		0–0	0–0	1–1	3–0
Merani-91 Tbilisi	1–0	0–0	1–0	3–1		0–0	4–0	1–0
Samgurali Tskaltubo	2–0	2–0	2–1	1–0	0–1		2–1	3–1
FC Tbilisi	2–0	1–4	3–0	0–1	0–1	0–0		0–4
TSU Tbilisi	2–0	1–0	7–2	0–1	2–1	1–0	2–0	

Source: rsssf.org
Legend: Blue = home team win; Yellow = draw; Red = away team win.

== Top goalscorers ==
Rank	Goalscorer	Team	Goals
1	(Georgia (country)) Zurab Ionanidze	Torpedo Kutaisi	24
2	(Georgia (country)) Tsotsonava	TSU Tbilisi	14
3	(Georgia (country)) Giorgi Koridze	WIT Georgia	12
4	(Georgia (country)) Rati Aleksidze	Dinamo Tbilisi	11
4	(Georgia (country)) Mikhail Ashvetia	Dinamo Tbilisi	11
4	(Georgia (country)) Varlam Kilasonia	Gorda Rustavi	11
4	(Georgia (country)) Giorgi Megreladze	Torpedo Kutaisi	11

== See also ==
- 1999–2000 Georgian Cup
