= 2007–08 Azerbaijan Premier League =

Azerbaijan Premier League
- Season: 2007–08
- Champions: Inter Baku
- Relegated: Gänclärbirliyi Sumqayit; ABN Bärdä
- Champions League: Inter Baku
- UEFA Cup: Olimpik Baku; Khazar Lankaran
- Intertoto Cup: Neftchi Baku
- Matches played: 182
- Goals scored: 437 (2.4 per match)
- Top goalscorer: Khagani Mammadov (19)
- Biggest home win: Standard Baku 6-0 ABN Bärdä; Masallı 6-0 Gänclärbirliyi Sumqayit
- Biggest away win: Gänclärbirliyi Sumqayit 0-6 Gabala
- Highest scoring: Gänclärbirliyi Sumqayit 2-6 Neftchi Baku

The 2007–08 Azerbaijan Premier League is the 16th season of Azerbaijan Premier League, the Azerbaijani professional league for association football clubs, since its establishment in 1992. Khazar Lankaran were the defending champions, having won the previous season.

== Teams ==
Shahdag Qusar were relegated after finishing the previous season in 13th. FK Gäncä, who were excluded from the league the previous season, also would not take part in the 2007–08 season. On 13 August 2007 UEFA declared MKT Araz defunct and withdrew their participation from the league.

They were replaced by ABN Bärdä, Masallı and Standard Baku from the Azerbaijan First Division.

=== Stadia and locations ===
Location of teams in Azerbaijan Premier League 2007–08

Team	Venue	Capacity
ABN Bärdä	Barda City Stadium	10,000
FK Baku	Tofik Bakhramov Stadium	29,858
Gabala	Gabala City Stadium	2,000
Gänclärbirliyi Sumqayit	Mehdi Huseynzade Stadium	15,350
Inter Baku	Shafa Stadium	8,200
Karabakh	Guzanli Olympic Stadium^{1}	15,000
Karvan	Yevlakh Stadium	5,000
Khazar Lankaran	Lankaran City Stadium	15,000
FK Masallı	Anatoliy Banishevskiy Stadium	7,500
Neftchi Baku	Tofik Bakhramov Stadium	29,858
Olimpik Baku	Shafa Stadium	8,200
Simurq Zaqatala	Zaqatala City Stadium	4,000
Standard Baku	Shafa Stadium	8,200
Turan Tovuz	Tovuz City Stadium	10,000

^{1}Karabakh played their home matches at Surakhani Stadium in Baku before moving to their current stadium on 3 May 2009.

=== Personnel and kits ===
Note: Flags indicate national team as has been defined under FIFA eligibility rules. Players may hold more than one non-FIFA nationality.

Team	Manager	Team captain	Kit manufacturer	Shirt sponsor
ABN Bärdä	(Azerbaijan) Faig Jabbarov			
Baku	(North Macedonia) Gjoko Hadžievski			
Gabala	(Azerbaijan) Ramiz Mammadov		Erreà	
Gänclärbirliyi Sumqayit	(Azerbaijan) Sabir Aliyev			
Inter Baku	(Ukraine) Valentyn Khodukin			
Karabakh	(Turkey) Rasim Kara			
Karvan	(Azerbaijan) Tabriz Hasanov			
Khazar Lankaran	(Azerbaijan) Agaselim Mirjavadov			
FK Masallı	(Azerbaijan) Gahraman Aliyev			
Neftchi Baku	(Ukraine) Anatoliy Demyanenko			
Olimpik Baku	(Azerbaijan) Asgar Abdullayev		Umbro	Silk Way Airlines
Simurq	(Ukraine) Roman Pokora			
Standard Baku	(Azerbaijan) Yunis Huseynov			
Turan Tovuz	(Turkey) Salahattin Darvand			

=== Managerial changes ===
Team	Outgoing manager	Manner of departure	Date of vacancy	Position in table	Incoming manager	Date of appointment
Neftchi Baku	(Czech Republic) Vlastimil Petržela	Sacked	5 January 2008		(Ukraine) Anatoliy Demyanenko	5 January 2008

== League table ==
Pos	Team	Pld	W	D	L	GF	GA	GD	Pts	Qualification or relegation
1	Inter Baku (C)	26	18	4	4	55	18	+37	58	Qualification for Champions League first qualifying round
2	Olimpik Baku	26	17	7	2	29	7	+22	58	Qualification for UEFA Cup first qualifying round (Note: Khazar Lankaran qualified for the first qualifiying round of the 1st qualifying round of the UEFA Cup as winners of the 2007–08 Azerbaijan Cup.)
3	Neftçi Baku	26	16	7	3	42	18	+24	55	Qualification for Intertoto Cup first round
4	Khazar Lankaran	26	14	10	2	44	16	+28	52	Qualification for UEFA Cup first qualifying round
5	Qarabağ	26	11	8	7	25	16	+9	41	
6	Gabala	26	11	3	12	33	36	−3	36	
7	Simurq	26	9	9	8	31	25	+6	36	
8	Baku	26	8	11	7	35	26	+9	35	
9	Standard Baku	26	8	8	10	36	26	+10	32	
10	FK Masallı	26	8	6	12	30	40	−10	30	
11	Karvan	26	6	5	15	23	36	−13	23	
12	Turan	26	4	6	16	21	49	−28	18	
13	Gänclärbirliyi Sumqayit (R)	26	4	2	20	21	68	−47	14	Relegation to Azerbaijan First Division
14	ABN Bärdä (R)	26	2	6	18	12	56	−44	12	Relegation to Azerbaijan First Division

Source: Azerbaijan Professional Football league
Rules for classification: 1) points; 2) goal difference; 3) number of goals scored.
(C) Champions; (R) Relegated

== Results ==
Home \ Away	ABB	BAK	GAB	GAS	INT	KAR	KHA	MAS	NEF	OLI	QAR	SIM	STA	TUR
ABN Bärdä		0–4	1–2	2–0	1–4	2–0	0–4	1–2	0–2	1–1	0–3	1–1	0–1	0–0
Baku	0–0		3–0	3–1	0–1	3–3	2–2	2–1	5–1	0–1	0–0	1–1	0–1	2–2
Gabala	2–0	2–0		2–2	2–1	1–0	1–1	1–1	2–3	0–1	1–2	1–0	1–0	2–1
Gänclärbirliyi Sumqayit	4–0	0–2	0–6		0–3	3–1	1–2	1–0	2–6	0–1	0–1	0–3	1–5	1–1
Inter Baku	4–0	1–0	4–0	3–0		3–1	2–2	3–0	0–0	2–0	1–0	2–0	1–1	3–1
Karvan	2–0	0–1	1–2	1–2	0–3		0–1	0–1	0–1	0–1	0–0	1–1	1–1	1–0
Khazar Lankaran	0–0	0–0	2–1	5–0	3–1	0–0		4–1	0–1	0–0	2–0	2–1	2–2	2–0
FK Masallı	1–1	2–0	1–0	6–0	0–3	4–1	0–3		0–2	1–2	1–0	1–1	1–1	3–1
Neftçi Baku	3–0	3–2	2–0	2–0	2–0	2–1	0–1	4–1		0–0	0–0	2–1	3–1	1–2
Olimpik Baku	1–0	3–0	2–0	1–0	1–0	2–0	0–0	3–1	0–0		0–1	1–0	1–0	3–0
Qarabağ	3–1	1–1	2–1	3–1	0–1	0–1	2–0	1–1	0–0	0–1		2–0	1–0	0–0
Simurq	3–1	0–0	2–0	3–0	3–4	0–1	1–1	1–0	0–0	0–0	1–0		1–0	3–0
Standard Baku	6–0	1–1	0–1	3–1	1–2	1–2	0–1	4–1	1–1	0–0	0–1	3–0		1–1
Turan	3–0	0–2	4–2	2–0	0–4	1–5	0–4	0–0	0–1	1–3	0–2	1–2	0–2	

Source: APL: Yüksək dəstə - 2007-08
Legend: Blue = home team win; Yellow = draw; Red = away team win.

== Season statistics ==
=== Top scorers ===
Rank	Player	Club	Goals
1	(Azerbaijan) Khagani Mammadov	Inter	19
2	(Azerbaijan) Branimir Subašić	Neftchi	14
3	(Uruguay) Walter Guglielmone	Inter	11
3	(Brazil) Junivan	Olimpik-Shuvalan	11
3	(Azerbaijan) Zaur Ramazanov	Khazar	11
6	(Ukraine) Volodymyr Mazyar	Simurq	10
7	(Georgia (country)) Roman Akhalkatsi	Karvan	9
7	(Georgia (country)) Georgi Adamia	Neftchi	9
9	(Russia) Vitali Balamestny	Gabala	8
9	(Brazil) Léo Rocha	Standard Baku	8

=== Hat-tricks ===
Player	For	Against	Result	Date
(Azerbaijan) Branimir Subašić	Neftchi	Gänclärbirliyi	6–2	18 August 2007
(Georgia (country)) Roman Akhalkatsi	Karvan	Turan	5–1	1 September 2007
(Azerbaijan) Khagani Mammadov	Inter	Turan	4–0	10 November 2007
(Russia) Vitali Balamestny^{4}	Gabala	Gänclärbirliyi	0–6	11 November 2007
(Moldova) Anatolie Doroș	Standard	Gänclärbirliyi	5–1	1 December 2007
(Azerbaijan) Nadir Nabiyev	Khazar	Gänclärbirliyi	5–0	29 March 2008

- ^{4} Player scored 4 goals
