= 2009–10 Gabala FC season =

Gabala
2009-10 season
- Chairman: Taleh Heydərov
- Manager: Ramiz Mammadov
- Stadium: Gabala City Stadium
- Premier League: 6th
- Azerbaijan Cup: 1st round vs Olimpik-Shuvalan
- Top goalscorer: League: Tomasz Stolpa (7); All: Tomasz Stolpa (7)
- Highest home attendance: 4,000 vs Khazar Lankaran; 19 September 2009
- Lowest home attendance: 290 vs Turan Tovuz; 9 February 2010
- Average home league attendance: 1,703
Home colours	Away colours

The Gabala FC 2009–10 season was Gabala's fourth Azerbaijan Premier League season, and their fourth season under manager Ramiz Mammadov. They finished the season in sixth place and were knocked out of the Azerbaijan Cup at the last 16 stage by Olimpik-Shuvalan. Their kit was supplied by Erreà and their main sponsor was Hyundai.

== Squad ==
As of match played 15 May 2010

No.	Name	Nationality	Position	Date of birth (age)	Signed from	Signed in	Contract ends	Apps.	Goals
Goalkeepers
1	Elnar Karimov	(Azerbaijan)	GK	5 April 1985 (aged 25)	Khazar Lankaran	2006		17	0
12	Pāvels Doroševs	(Latvia)	GK	9 October 1980 (aged 29)	Skonto Riga	2009			
Defenders
2	Velichko Velichkov	(Bulgaria)	DF	24 November 1986 (aged 23)	OFC Sliven 2000	2010	2010		
3	Vurğun Hüseynov	(Azerbaijan)	DF	25 April 1988 (aged 22)	Turan Tovuz	2008			
4	Azer Mammadov	(Azerbaijan)	DF	7 February 1976 (aged 34)	Qarabağ	2009	2010		
5	Sergei Sokolov (Note: Sergei Sokolov was born in Stavropol, Russian SFSR, but qualified to represent Azerbaijan, representing them at senior level in 2006.)	(Azerbaijan)	DF	12 March 1977 (aged 33)	Simurq	2010	2010		
6	Ljubo Baranin	(Serbia)	DF	25 August 1986 (aged 23)	Bežanija	2009	2010		
14	Milan Antić	(Serbia)	DF	1 July 1981 (aged 28)	Jedinstvo Bijelo Polje	2009	2010		
15	Răzvan Țârlea	(Romania)	DF	5 August 1979 (aged 30)	Petrolul Ploiești	2009	2010		
21	Arif Dashdemirov (Note: Sergei Sokolov was born in Makhachkala, Russian SFSR, but qualified to represent Azerbaijan, representing them at senior level in 2010.)	(Azerbaijan)	DF	10 February 1987 (aged 23)	Standard Sumgayit	2009	2010		
Midfielders
7	Yashar Abuzarov	(Azerbaijan)	MF	9 September 1977 (aged 32)	Olimpik Baku	2009	2010		
8	Maksym Skorokhodov	(Ukraine)	MF	3 December 1986 (aged 23)	Metalurh Zaporizhzhia	2009			
11	Anatolie Ostap	(Moldova)	MF	22 November 1979 (aged 30)	Vėtra	2009	2010		
16	Kader Camara	(Guinea)	MF	16 August 1977 (aged 32)	Olimpik-Shuvalan	2010			
17	Paulino Tavares	(Portugal)	MF	10 December 1984 (aged 25)	Trelleborg	2010	2010		
18	Goga Beraia (Note: Goga Beraia was born in the Georgian SSR, but qualified to represent Azerbaijan, representing them at U21 level in 2006.) (captain)	(Azerbaijan)	MF	26 January 1984 (aged 26)	Qarabağ	2008			
19	Revaz Getsadze	(Georgia (country))	MF	11 January 1985 (aged 25)	Olimpik-Shuvalan	2009	2010		
20	Cristian Torres (Note: Cristian Torres was born in Vicente López, Argentina, but qualified to represent Latvia after gaining citizenship, making his international debut for Latvia in September 2016.)	(Argentina)	MF	18 June 1985 (aged 24)	Jūrmala-VV	2009			
22	Parvin Pashaev	(Azerbaijan)	MF	29 August 1988 (aged 21)	Neftçi	2007			
23	Azer Hashimov	(Azerbaijan)	MF	6 November 1984 (aged 25)		2007			
26	Namig Aliev	(Azerbaijan)	MF	29 September 1990 (aged 19)		2009			
	Mushfig Teymurov	(Azerbaijan)	MF	15 January 1993 (aged 17)	Karvan	2009			
Forwards
9	Tomasz Stolpa	(Poland)	FW	18 March 1983 (aged 27)	Grindavík	2008			
10	Kanan Karimov	(Azerbaijan)	FW	5 August 1976 (aged 33)	Qarabağ	2008			
24	Ihor Melnyk	(Ukraine)	FW	5 March 1983 (aged 27)	Illichivets Mariupol	2009	2010		
25	Rahman Musayev	(Azerbaijan)	FW	14 December 1986 (aged 23)	Trainee	2008			
Left during the season
2	Milan Marinković	(Serbia)	DF	23 May 1986 (aged 23)	Radnički Niš	2009	2010		
16	Mykola Hybalyuk	(Ukraine)	DF	21 May 1984 (aged 25)	Dacia Chișinău	2009	2010		
17	Volodymyr Bondarchuk	(Ukraine)	MF	20 February 1981 (aged 29)	Ihroservice Simferopol	2009	2010		

== Transfers ==
=== In ===
Date	Position	Nationality	Name	From	Fee	Ref.
Summer 2009	MF	(Argentina)	Cristian Torres	Jūrmala	Undisclosed	
Summer 2009	MF	(Azerbaijan)	Mushfig Teymurov	Karvan	Undisclosed	
Summer 2009	MF	(Ukraine)	Maksym Skorokhodov	Metalurh Zaporizhzhia	Undisclosed	
20 July 2009	DF	(Azerbaijan)	Arif Dashdemirov	Standard Sumgayit	Undisclosed	
20 July 2009	MF	(Georgia (country))	Revaz Getsadze	Olimpik Baku	Undisclosed	
20 July 2009	FW	(Ukraine)	Ihor Melnyk	Illichivets Mariupol	Undisclosed	
9 August 2009	DF	(Serbia)	Milan Marinković	Radnički Niš	Undisclosed	
9 August 2009	DF	(Serbia)	Ljubo Baranin	Bežanija	Undisclosed	
9 August 2009	DF	(Serbia)	Milan Antić	Jedinstvo Bijelo Polje	Undisclosed	
9 August 2009	DF	(Romania)	Răzvan Țârlea	Petrolul Ploiești	Undisclosed	
9 August 2009	DF	(Ukraine)	Mykola Hybalyuk	Dacia Chișinău	Undisclosed	
9 August 2009	MF	(Ukraine)	Volodymyr Bondarchuk	Ihroservice Simferopol	Undisclosed	
13 August 2009	DF	(Azerbaijan)	Azer Mammadov	Qarabağ	Undisclosed	
28 January 2010	DF	(Azerbaijan)	Sergey Sokolov	Simurq	Undisclosed	
28 January 2010	MF	(Portugal)	Paulino Tavares	Trelleborg	Undisclosed	
1 February 2010	MF	(Guinea)	Kader Camara	Olimpik-Shuvalan	Undisclosed	
2 February 2010	DF	(Bulgaria)	Velichko Velichkov	OFC Sliven 2000	Undisclosed	

=== Released ===
Date	Position	Nationality	Name	Joined	Date	Ref
Winter 2010	DF	(Serbia)	Milan Marinković	Dinamo Vranje		
Winter 2010	DF	(Ukraine)	Mykola Hybalyuk	Hoverla-Zakarpattia Uzhhorod		
Winter 2010	DF	(Ukraine)	Volodimir Bondarchuk	Sevastopol		
31 May 2010	DF	(Azerbaijan)	Arif Dashdemirov	Inter Baku		
31 May 2010	DF	(Azerbaijan)	Azer Mammadov	Kapaz		
31 May 2010	MF	(Azerbaijan)	Azer Hashimov	MOIK Baku		
31 May 2010	MF	(Georgia (country))	Revaz Getsadze	Metalurgi Rustavi		
31 May 2010	MF	(Moldova)	Anatolie Ostap	Banga Gargždai		
31 May 2010	MF	(Portugal)	Paulino Tavares	Aubervilliers		
31 May 2010	MF	(Ukraine)	Maksym Skorokhodov	Feniks-Illichovets Kalinine		
31 May 2010	FW	(Azerbaijan)	Kanan Karimov	Kapaz		
31 May 2010	FW	(Poland)	Tomasz Stolpa	Zagłębie Sosnowiec	12 September 2010	
31 May 2010	FW	(Ukraine)	Ihor Melnyk	Sumy		

== Friendlies ==
	Gabala	6–0	Energetik
AZST (UTC+5)	Presl 22'	Report	Karimov; Stolpa; Torres; Hybalyuk

== Competitions ==
=== Overview ===
Competition	First match	Last match	Starting round	Final position	Record							
Competition	First match	Last match	Starting round	Final position	Pld	W	D	L	GF	GA	GD	Win %
Premier League	16 August 2009	15 May 2010	Matchday 1	6th	32	13	10	9	36	36	+0	40.63
Azerbaijan Cup	4 November 2009	11 November 2009	Last 16	Last 16	2	1	0	1	1	2	−1	50.00
Total					34	14	10	10	37	38	−1	41.18

Last updated: 15 May 2010
Source: Competitions

=== Premier League ===
==== First Round ====
===== Results =====
16 August 2009 1	Gabala	2 - 1	Simurq	Qabala
18:00 AZST (UTC+5)	Karimov 11'; Melnyk 23'	Summary	Artiukh 34'	Stadium: Gabala City Stadium; Attendance: 2,600; Referee: Rovshan Ahmadov

12 September 2009 2	Karvan	4 - 1	Gabala	Yevlakh
17:00 AZST (UTC+5)	Gomes 14'; Mammadov 16'; Pereira 63'; Ataýew 87'	Summary	Antić 64'	Stadium: Yevlakh Stadium; Attendance: 2,000; Referee: Afgan Hamzayev

19 September 2009 3	Gabala	1 - 1	Khazar Lankaran	Qabala
17:00 AZST (UTC+5)	Melnyk 88'	Summary	Souza 26'	Stadium: Gabala City Stadium; Attendance: 4,000; Referee: Fariz Yusifov

23 September 2009 4	Qarabağ	0 - 0	Gabala	Baku^{1}
16:00 AZST (UTC+5)		Summary		Stadium: Tofiq Bahramov Stadium; Attendance: 3,000; Referee: Anar Salmanov

26 September 2009 5	Inter Baku	3 - 2	Gabala	Baku
17:00 AZST (UTC+5)	Levin 68'; Rocha 88'; Karlsons 90'	Summary	Melnyk 36'; Torres 69'	Stadium: Shafa Stadium; Attendance: 750; Referee: Aliyar Aghayev

17 October 2009 6	Gabala	2 - 1	Olimpik-Shuvalan	Qabala
16:00 AZST (UTC+5)	Karimov 60'; Claudiano 68' (o.g.)	Summary	Doroş 55'	Stadium: Gabala City Stadium; Attendance: 1,000; Referee: Vusal Aliyev

21 October 2009 7	Gabala	1 - 0	Neftchi Baku	Qabala
16:00 AZST (UTC+5)	Torres 80'	Summary		Stadium: Gabala City Stadium; Attendance: 1,500; Referee: Fariz Yusifov

25 October 2009 8	Turan Tovuz	0 - 1	Gabala	Tovuz
15:00 AZST (UTC+5)		Summary	Hüseynov 56'	Stadium: Tovuz City Stadium; Attendance: 500; Referee: Elchin Mämmädov

31 October 2009 9	Gabala	0 - 2	Baku	Qabala
14:00 AZST (UTC+5)		Summary	Savinov 40'; Šolić 76'	Stadium: Gabala City Stadium; Attendance: 1,500; Referee: Rovshan Ahmadov

7 November 2009 10	Gabala	3 - 0	Mughan	Qabala
14:00 AZT (UTC+4)	Stolpa 3', 42'; Beraia 85'	Summary	Hodžić (yellow card) 43' (yellow-red card) 79'	Stadium: Gabala City Stadium; Attendance: 500; Referee: Afgan Hamzayev

20 November 2009 11	Standard	1 - 2	Gabala	Sumgayit
14:00 AZT (UTC+4)	Zeynalov 75'	Summary	Stolpa 21'; Melnyk 68'; Melnyk (red card) 78'	Stadium: Mehdi Huseynzade Stadium; Attendance: 300; Referee: Azer Salmanov

28 November 2009 12	Simurq	1 - 1	Gabala	Zaqatala
18:00 AZT (UTC+4)	Mammadov 47'	Summary	Malygin 86' (o.g.)	Stadium: Zaqatala City Stadium; Attendance: 2,000; Referee: Elchin Mämmädov

6 December 2009 13	Gabala	1 - 1	Qarabağ	Qabala
14:15 AZT (UTC+4)	Stolpa 52' (pen.); Stolpa (yellow card) 1' (yellow-red card) 71'	Summary	Sadygov 78'; Teli (yellow card) 89' (yellow-red card) 90'	Stadium: Gabala City Stadium; Attendance: 1,000; Referee: Anar Salmanov

10 December 2009 14	Neftchi Baku	1 - 1	Gabala	Baku
14:00 AZT (UTC+4)	Malikov 65'	Summary	Hüseynov 73'; Aliyev (yellow card) 64' (yellow-red card) 90+2'	Stadium: Tofik Bakhramov Stadium; Attendance: 500; Referee: Rovshan Ahmadov

13 December 2009 15	Gabala	1 - 0	Karvan	Qabala
14:00 AZT (UTC+4)	Ţârlea 31'; Stolpa (red card) 54'	Summary	Jafarguliyev (red card) 54'	Stadium: Gabala City Stadium; Attendance: 2,000; Referee: Rauf Jabbarov

19 December 2009 16	Khazar Lankaran	1 - 0	Gabala	Lankaran
16:00 AZT (UTC+4)	Amirguliev 52'	Summary		Stadium: Lankaran City Stadium; Attendance: 7,000; Referee: Azad Mutallimov

24 December 2009 17	Gabala	0 - 1	Inter Baku	Qabala
14:00 AZT (UTC+4)		Summary	Zlatinov 87'	Stadium: Gabala City Stadium; Attendance: 800; Referee: Afgan Hamzayev

2 February 2010 18	Olimpik-Shuvalan	0 - 2	Gabala	Baku
14:00 AZT (UTC+4)		Summary	Torres 11', 43'	Stadium: AZAL Stadium; Attendance: 400; Referee: Rasim Mammadov

9 February 2010 19	Gabala	1 - 0	Turan Tovuz	Qabala
14:00 AZT (UTC+4)	Karimov 63' (pen.)	Summary		Stadium: Gabala City Stadium; Attendance: 290; Referee: Rauf Jabbarov

13 February 2010 20	Baku	2 - 0	Gabala	Baku
14:00 AZT (UTC+4)	Duymuş 35'; Adriano 90+2'	Summary		Stadium: Tofig Bakhramov Stadium; Attendance: 500; Referee: Fariz Yusifov

17 February 2010 21	Mughan	0 - 0	Gabala	Salyan
14:00 AZT (UTC+4)	Novruzov (red card) 23'	Summary		Stadium: Salyan Olympic Sport Complex Stadium; Attendance: 640; Referee: Zohrab Aliyev

21 February 2010 22	Gabala	2 - 1	Standard	Qabala
14:00 AZT (UTC+4)	Torres 13'; Hüseynov 59'	Summary	Balamestny 9'	Stadium: Gabala City Stadium; Attendance: 1,050; Referee: Vusal Aliyev

===== Table =====
Pos	Team	Pld	W	D	L	GF	GA	GD	Pts	Qualification
3	Qarabağ	22	11	9	2	21	12	+9	42	Qualification for championship group
4	Baku	22	10	7	5	22	17	+5	37	Qualification for championship group
5	Gabala	22	10	6	6	24	21	+3	36	Qualification for championship group
6	Neftçi Baku	22	9	8	5	20	14	+6	35	Qualification for championship group
7	Simurq	22	9	7	6	26	21	+5	34	Qualification for relegation group

Source: Soccerway.com
Rules for classification: 1) points; 2) goal difference; 3) number of goals scored.

==== Championship Group ====
===== Results =====
12 March 2010 23	Khazar Lankaran	4 - 1	Gabala	Lankaran
18:00 AZT (UTC+4)	Lalín 22', 59'; Opara 75'; Calincov 90'	Summary	Antić 81'	Stadium: Lankaran City Stadium; Attendance: 7,000; Referee: Elnur Muradov

21 March 2010 24	Gabala	3 - 1	Qarabağ	Qabala
15:00 AZT (UTC+4)	Lopes Tavares 49'; Ihor Melnyk 73', 84'	Summary	Adamia 43'	Stadium: Gabala City Stadium; Attendance: 1,000; Referee: Afgan Hamzayev

28 March 2010 25	Baku	1 - 1	Gabala	Baku
16:00 AZST (UTC+5)	Šolić 21'	Summary	Pashayev 78'	Stadium: Tofig Bakhramov Stadium; Attendance: 700; Referee: Anar Salmanov

3 April 2010 26	Neftchi Baku	1 - 2	Gabala	Baku
16:00 AZST (UTC+5)	Abdullayev 63'	Summary	Antić 35'; Stolpa 90+5'	Stadium: Tofik Bakhramov Stadium; Attendance: 2,000; Referee: Elnur Muradov

10 April 2010 27	Gabala	1 - 1	Inter Baku	Qabala
16:00 AZST (UTC+5)	Karimov 90' (pen.)	Summary	Poškus 61' (pen.)	Stadium: Gabala City Stadium; Attendance: 1,500; Referee: Anar Salmanov

17 April 2010 28	Gabala	1 - 2	Khazar Lankaran	Qabala
16:00 AZST (UTC+5)	Stolpa 37'	Summary	Lalín 9'; Opara 53'	Stadium: Gabala City Stadium; Attendance: 3,000; Referee: Rovshan Ahmadov

24 April 2010 29	Qarabağ	1 - 1	Gabala	Baku^{1}
17:00 AZST (UTC+5)	Aliyev 10'	Summary	Karimov 18'	Stadium: Tofiq Bahramov Stadium; Attendance: 2,500; Referee: Fariz Yusifov

1 May 2010 30	Gabala	1 - 0	Baku	Qabala
17:15 AZST (UTC+5)	Lopes Tavares 72'	Summary		Stadium: Gabala City Stadium; Attendance: 2,000; Referee: Fariz Yusifov

9 May 2010 31	Gabala	0 - 0	Neftchi Baku	Qabala
17:15 AZST (UTC+5)		Summary		Stadium: Gabala City Stadium; Attendance: 3,500; Referee: Afgan Hamzayev

15 May 2010 32	Inter Baku	4 - 1	Gabala	Baku
17:15 AZST (UTC+5)	Poškus 40', 47', 67'; Zlatinov 16'	Summary	Stolpa 90+1'	Stadium: Shafa Stadium; Attendance: 1,500; Referee: Elchin Mämmädov

===== Table =====
Pos	Team	Pld	W	D	L	GF	GA	GD	Pts	Qualification
2	Baku	20	7	7	6	19	15	+4	28	Qualification for Europa League second qualifying round (Note: Baku were the winners of the 2009–10 Azerbaijan Cup competition and qualified for the second qualifying round of the UEFA Europa League.)
3	Qarabağ	20	6	9	5	16	18	−2	27 (Note: QAR: 7 pts, 4–3; KHA: 4 pts, 3–4)	Qualification for Europa League first qualifying round
4	Khazar Lankaran	20	6	9	5	19	14	+5	27	Qualification for Europa League first qualifying round
5	Neftçi Baku	20	4	11	5	11	12	−1	23	
6	Gabala	20	4	8	8	18	27	−9	20	

Source: Soccerway.com
Rules for classification: 1) points; 2) head-to-head points; 3) head-to-head goal difference; 4) head-to-head goals scored; 5) goal difference; 6) number of goals scored.

=== Azerbaijan Cup ===
4 November 2009 Last 16 1st Leg	Olimpik-Shuvalan	2 - 0	Gabala	Baku
14:00 AZT (UTC+4)	Doroș 74', 76'	Summary; Summary		Stadium: AZAL Stadium; Referee: Azad Mutallimov

11 November 2009 Last 16 2nd Leg	Gabala	1 - 0 (1 - 2 agg.)	Olimpik-Shuvalan	Qabala
14:00 AZT (UTC+4)	Karimov 90' (pen.)	Summary; Summary		Stadium: Gabala City Stadium

== Squad statistics ==
As of match played 15 May 2010

=== Appearances and goals ===
No.	Pos	Nat	Player	Total		Premier League		Azerbaijan Cup	
No.	Pos	Nat	Player	Apps	Goals	Apps	Goals	Apps	Goals
1	GK	(Azerbaijan) AZE	Elnar Karimov	3	0	3	0	0	0
2	DF	(Bulgaria) BUL	Velichko Velichkov	4	0	4	0	0	0
3	DF	(Azerbaijan) AZE	Vurğun Hüseynov	27	3	26+1	3	0	0
4	DF	(Azerbaijan) AZE	Azer Mammadov	3	0	3	0	0	0
5	DF	(Azerbaijan) AZE	Sergey Sokolov	5	0	2+3	0	0	0
6	DF	(Serbia) SRB	Ljubo Baranin	30	0	29+1	0	0	0
7	MF	(Azerbaijan) AZE	Yashar Abuzerov	16	0	7+9	0	0	0
8	MF	(Ukraine) UKR	Maksym Skorokhodov	7	0	6+1	0	0	0
9	FW	(Poland) POL	Tomasz Stolpa	27	7	15+12	7	0	0
10	FW	(Azerbaijan) AZE	Kanan Karimov	23	6	20+3	5	0	1
11	MF	(Moldova) MDA	Anatolie Ostap	19	0	14+5	0	0	0
12	GK	(Latvia) LAT	Pāvels Doroševs	29	0	29+0	0	0	0
14	DF	(Serbia) SRB	Milan Antić	29	3	28+1	3	0	0
15	DF	(Romania) ROU	Răzvan Țârlea	25	1	23+2	1	0	0
16	MF	(Guinea) GUI	Kader Camara	13	0	13	0	0	0
17	MF	(Portugal) POR	Paulino Tavares	14	2	7+7	2	0	0
18	MF	(Azerbaijan) AZE	Goga Beraia	28	1	28	1	0	0
19	MF	(Georgia (country)) GEO	Revaz Getsadze	17	0	12+5	0	0	0
20	MF	(Argentina) ARG	Cristian Torres	28	5	16+12	5	0	0
21	DF	(Azerbaijan) AZE	Arif Dashdemirov	18	0	13+5	0	0	0
22	MF	(Azerbaijan) AZE	Parvin Pashayev	12	1	3+9	1	0	0
23	MF	(Azerbaijan) AZE	Azer Hashimov	2	0	1+1	0	0	0
24	FW	(Ukraine) UKR	Ihor Melnyk	27	6	22+5	6	0	0
25	FW	(Azerbaijan) AZE	Rahman Musayev	2	0	0+2	0	0	0
26	MF	(Azerbaijan) AZE	Namig Aliyev	13	0	6+7	0	0	0
Players who appeared for Gabala who left during the season:
2	DF	(Serbia) SRB	Milan Marinković	1	0	0+1	0	0	0
16	DF	(Ukraine) UKR	Mykola Hybalyuk	11	0	10+1	0	0	0
17	MF	(Ukraine) UKR	Volodimir Bondarchuk	14	0	12+2	0	0	0

=== Goal scorers ===
Place	Position	Nation	Number	Name	Premier League	Azerbaijan Cup	Total
1	FW	(Poland)	9	Tomasz Stolpa	7	0	7
2	FW	(Ukraine)	24	Ihor Melnyk	6	0	6
2	FW	(Azerbaijan)	10	Kanan Karimov	5	1	6
4	MF	(Argentina)	20	Cristian Torres	5	0	5
5	DF	(Serbia)	14	Milan Antić	3	0	3
5	DF	(Azerbaijan)	3	Vurğun Hüseynov	3	0	3
7	MF	(Portugal)	17	Paulino Tavares	2	0	2
7				Own goal	2	0	2
9	DF	(Romania)	15	Răzvan Țârlea	1	0	1
9	MF	(Azerbaijan)	22	Parvin Pashayev	1	0	1
9	MF	(Azerbaijan)	18	Goga Beraia	1	0	1
				TOTALS	36	1	37

=== Disciplinary record ===
Number	Nation	Position	Name	Premier League		Azerbaijan Cup		Total	
Number	Nation	Position	Name	Yellow card	Red card	Yellow card	Red card	Yellow card	Red card
1	(Azerbaijan)	GK	Elnar Karimov	1	0	0	0	1	0
2	(Bulgaria)	DF	Velichko Velichkov	2	0	0	0	2	0
3	(Azerbaijan)	DF	Vurğun Hüseynov	10	0	0	0	10	0
5	(Azerbaijan)	DF	Sergei Sokolov	1	0	0	0	1	0
6	(Serbia)	DF	Ljubo Baranin	7	0	0	0	7	0
7	(Azerbaijan)	MF	Yashar Abuzerov	6	0	0	0	6	0
8	(Ukraine)	MF	Maksym Skorokhodov	1	0	0	0	1	0
9	(Poland)	FW	Tomasz Stolpa	8	2	0	0	8	2
10	(Azerbaijan)	FW	Kanan Karimov	4	0	0	0	4	0
12	(Latvia)	GK	Pāvels Doroševs	3	0	0	0	3	0
11	(Moldova)	MF	Anatolie Ostap	6	0	0	0	6	0
14	(Serbia)	DF	Milan Antić	8	0	0	0	8	0
15	(Romania)	DF	Răzvan Țârlea	8	0	0	0	8	0
16	(Guinea)	MF	Kader Camara	5	0	0	0	5	0
17	(Portugal)	MF	Paulino Tavares	2	0	0	0	2	0
18	(Azerbaijan)	MF	Goga Beraia	10	0	0	0	10	0
19	(Georgia (country))	MF	Revaz Getsadze	4	0	0	0	4	0
20	(Argentina)	MF	Cristian Torres	2	0	0	0	2	0
23	(Azerbaijan)	MF	Azer Hashimov	1	0	0	0	1	0
24	(Ukraine)	FW	Ihor Melnyk	0	1	0	0	0	1
26	(Azerbaijan)	MF	Namig Aliev	3	1	0	0	3	1
Players away on loan:
Players who left Gabala during the season:
16	(Ukraine)	DF	Mykola Hybalyuk	2	0	0	0	2	0
17	(Ukraine)	MF	Volodimir Bondarchuk	3	0	0	0	3	0
			TOTALS	97	4	0	0	97	4
