= 2008–09 Gabala FC season =

Gabala
2008–09 season
- Chairman: Taleh Heydərov
- Manager: Ramiz Mammadov
- Stadium: Gabala City Stadium
- Premier League: 10th
- Azerbaijan Cup: Semi-finals
- Top goalscorer: League: Farzad Hatami (8); All: Kanan Karimov (12)
Home colours	Away colours

The Gabala FC 2008–09 season was Gabala's third Azerbaijan Premier League season, and their third season under manager Ramiz Mammadov. They finished 10th in the Premier League, whilst being knocked out at the Semifinal stage of the 2008–09 Azerbaijan Cup by Inter Baku. Their kit was supplied by Erreà and their main sponsor was Hyundai.

== Squad ==
As of match played 17 May 2009

No.	Name	Nationality	Position	Date of birth (age)	Signed from	Signed in	Contract ends	Apps.	Goals
Goalkeepers
1	Elnar Karimov	(Azerbaijan)	GK	5 April 1985 (aged 24)	Khazar Lankaran	2006			
12	Pāvels Doroševs	(Latvia)	GK	9 October 1980 (aged 28)	Skonto Riga	2009			
Defenders
2	Azar Bagirov	(Azerbaijan)	DF	26 June 1984 (aged 24)		2008			
5	Mikayil Namazov	(Azerbaijan)	DF	17 October 1983 (aged 25)	Viləş Masallı	2009			
15	Vurğun Hüseynov	(Azerbaijan)	DF	25 April 1988 (aged 21)	Turan Tovuz	2008			
19	Vugar Hasanov	(Azerbaijan)	DF			2007			
	Ruslan Huseynov	(Azerbaijan)	DF			2007			
Midfielders
3	Anatoli Tebloyev	(Russia)	MF	16 July 1974 (aged 34)	Znamya Truda	2007			
6	Kader Camara	(Guinea)	MF	16 August 1977 (aged 31)	Dessel Sport	2007			
7	Yashar Abuzarov	(Azerbaijan)	MF	9 September 1977 (aged 31)	Olimpik Baku	2009			
8	Matlab Mammadov	(Azerbaijan)	MF	14 August 1981 (aged 27)	Karvan	2008			
11	Anatolie Ostap	(Moldova)	MF	22 November 1979 (aged 29)	Vėtra	2009			
16	Victor Comleonoc	(Moldova)	MF	23 February 1979 (aged 30)	SKA Rostov-on-Don	2009			
17	Tornike Aptsiauri	(Georgia (country))	MF	29 November 1979 (aged 29)	Olimpi Rustavi	2007			
18	Goga Beraia	(Azerbaijan)	MF	26 January 1984 (aged 25)	Qarabağ	2008			
20	Anar Qasimov	(Azerbaijan)	MF	16 August 1988 (aged 20)		2008			
21	Azer Hashimov	(Azerbaijan)	MF	6 November 1984 (aged 24)		2007			
22	Parvin Pashaev	(Azerbaijan)	MF	29 August 1988 (aged 20)	Neftçi	2007			
24	Mekan Nasyrow	(Turkmenistan)	MF	16 April 1982 (aged 27)	Karvan	2009			
Forwards
9	Tomasz Stolpa	(Poland)	FW	18 March 1983 (aged 26)	Grindavík	2009			
10	Kanan Karimov	(Azerbaijan)	FW	5 August 1976 (aged 32)	Qarabağ	2008			
14	Farzad Hatami	(Iran)	FW	3 January 1986 (aged 23)	Rah Ahan	2008			
23	Rahman Musayev	(Azerbaijan)	FW	14 December 1986 (aged 22)	Trainee	2008			
25	Samir Zargarov	(Azerbaijan)	FW	29 September 1986 (aged 22)	Adliyya Baku	2006			
Out on loan
Left during the season
2	Tiago	(Brazil)	DF			2008			
4	Milija Žižić	(Serbia)	DF	28 February 1979 (aged 30)	Kitchee	2008			
5	Ali Ismaylov	(Azerbaijan)	DF	19 December 1981 (aged 27)	Adliyya Baku	2005			
7	Şəhruz Mustafayev	(Azerbaijan)	MF	8 September 1975 (aged 33)	Olimpik Baku	2007			
10	Asen Nikolov	(Bulgaria)	MF	5 August 1976 (aged 32)	Baku	2008			
12	Jahangir Hasanzade	(Azerbaijan)	GK	4 August 1979 (aged 29)	Inter Baku	2008			
14	Eldaniz Suleymanov	(Azerbaijan)	DF			2007			
15	Elnur Abbasov	(Azerbaijan)	DF	7 March 1984 (aged 25)	Baku	2008			
16	Farrukh Ismayilov	(Azerbaijan)	MF	30 August 1978 (aged 30)	Olympik Baku	2008			
18	Samir Mammadov	(Azerbaijan)	MF	20 October 1980 (aged 28)		2006			
20	Vusal Huseynov	(Azerbaijan)	MF	9 November 1982 (aged 26)	Turan Tovuz	2008			

== Transfers ==
=== In ===
Date	Position	Nationality	Name	From	Fee	Ref.
Summer 2008	GK	(Azerbaijan)	Jahangir Hasanzade	Inter Baku	Undisclosed	
Summer 2008	DF	(Azerbaijan)	Elnur Abbasov	Baku	Undisclosed	
Summer 2008	DF	(Azerbaijan)	Vurğun Hüseynov	Turan Tovuz	Undisclosed	
Summer 2008	DF	(Serbia)	Milija Žižić	Kitchee	Undisclosed	
Summer 2008	MF	(Azerbaijan)	Goga Beraia	Qarabağ	Undisclosed	
Summer 2008	MF	(Azerbaijan)	Vusal Huseynov	Turan Tovuz	Undisclosed	
Summer 2008	MF	(Azerbaijan)	Farrukh Ismayilov	Olimpik Baku	Undisclosed	
Summer 2008	MF	(Azerbaijan)	Matlab Mamedov	Karvan	Undisclosed	
Summer 2008	MF	(Bulgaria)	Asen Nikolov	Baku	Undisclosed	
Summer 2008	FW	(Azerbaijan)	Kanan Karimov	Qarabağ	Undisclosed	
Summer 2008	FW	(Iran)	Farzad Hatami	Rah Ahan	Undisclosed	
Winter 2009	DF	(Azerbaijan)	Azar Bagirov	Turan Tovuz	Undisclosed	
January 2009	GK	(Latvia)	Pāvels Doroševs	Skonto Riga	Undisclosed	
January 2009	DF	(Azerbaijan)	Mikayil Namazov	Viləş Masallı	Undisclosed	
January 2009	MF	(Azerbaijan)	Yashar Abuzarov	Olimpik Baku	Undisclosed	
January 2009	MF	(Moldova)	Victor Comleonoc	SKA Rostov-on-Don	Undisclosed	
January 2009	MF	(Moldova)	Anatolie Ostap	Vėtra	Undisclosed	
January 2009	MF	(Turkmenistan)	Mekan Nasyrow	Karvan	Undisclosed	
January 2009	FW	(Poland)	Tomasz Stolpa	Grindavík	Undisclosed	

=== Released ===
Date	Position	Nationality	Name	Joined	Date	Ref
Winter 2009	GK	(Azerbaijan)	Jahangir Hasanzade	AZAL		
Winter 2009	DF	(Azerbaijan)	Elnur Abbasov			
Winter 2009	DF	(Azerbaijan)	Ali Ismaylov			
Winter 2009	DF	(Azerbaijan)	Eldaniz Suleymanov			
Winter 2009	DF	(Brazil)	Tiago			
Winter 2009	DF	(Serbia)	Milija Žižić	Grafičar Beograd		
Winter 2009	MF	(Azerbaijan)	Vusal Huseynov	Turan Tovuz		
Winter 2009	MF	(Azerbaijan)	Farrukh Ismayilov	Mughan		
Winter 2009	MF	(Azerbaijan)	Samir Mamedov			
Winter 2009	MF	(Azerbaijan)	Shahruz Mustafayev			
Winter 2009	MF	(Bulgaria)	Asen Nikolov	Slavia Sofia		
Summer 2009	MF	(Georgia (country))	Tornike Aptsiauri	Zestaponi		
Summer 2009	MF	(Guinea)	Kader Camara	Olimpik-Shuvalan		
Summer 2009	MF	(Moldova)	Victor Comleonoc	Obolon Kyiv		
Summer 2009	MF	(Russia)	Anatoli Tebloyev	Retired		
Summer 2009	MF	(Turkmenistan)	Mekan Nasyrow	Persik Kediri		
Summer 2009	FW	(Iran)	Farzad Hatami	Sepahan		

== Competitions ==
=== Overview ===
Competition	First match	Last match	Starting round	Final position	Record							
Competition	First match	Last match	Starting round	Final position	Pld	W	D	L	GF	GA	GD	Win %
Premier League	9 August 2008	17 May 2009	Matchday 1	10th	26	9	6	11	28	21	+7	34.62
Azerbaijan Cup	29 October 2008	6 May 2009	Round of 16	Semifinal	6	4	1	1	8	8	+0	66.67
Total					32	13	7	12	36	29	+7	40.63

Last updated: 17 May 2009
Source: Competitions

=== Premier League ===
==== Results summary ====
Overall								Home						Away					
Pld	W	D	L	GF	GA	GD	Pts	W	D	L	GF	GA	GD	W	D	L	GF	GA	GD
26	9	6	11	28	21	+7	33	5	2	6	16	10	+6	4	4	5	12	11	+1

Last updated: 13 August 2011.
Source: Soccerway

==== Results by round ====
Round	1	2	3	4	5	6	7	8	9	10	11	12	13	14	15	16	17	18	19	20	21	22	23	24	25	26
Ground	H	A	H	A	H	A	H	A	A	A	H	H	A	A	H	A	H	A	H	A	H	H	H	A	A	H
Result	W	W	L	D	L	L	W	L	L	L	L	D	D	W	W	D	L	D	W	W	D	W	L	W	L	L
Position																										10

Source: Soccerway
A = Away; H = Home; W = Win; D = Draw; L = Loss

==== Results ====
9 August 2008 1	Gabala	4–1	NBC Salyan^{1}	Qabala
18:00 AZST (UTC+5)	Karimov 4' (pen.), 65'; Tebloev 26'; Zargarov 87'	Summary	Guliev 77'	Stadium: Gabala City Stadium; Attendance: 800; Referee: Afgan Hamzayev

17 August 2008 2	MOIK Baku	0–3	Gabala	Baku
18:00 AZST (UTC+5)		Summary	Hatami 63', 69', 76'	Stadium: MOIK Stadium; Attendance: 200; Referee: İmankhan Sultani

24 August 2008 3	Gabala	0–1	Neftchi Baku	Qabala
18:00 AZST (UTC+5)		Summary	Herasymyuk 39'	Stadium: Gabala City Stadium; Attendance: 1,500; Referee: Vusal Aliyev

30 August 2008 4	Inter Baku	1–1	Gabala	Baku
19:00 AZST (UTC+5)	Guglielmone 85'	Summary	Tiago 23'	Stadium: Shafa Stadium; Attendance: 800; Referee: Azad Mutallimov

20 September 2008 5	Gabala	1–2	Qarabağ	Qabala
17:00 AZST (UTC+5)	Karimov 78'	Summary	Imamaliev 31'; Javadov 85'	Stadium: Gabala City Stadium; Attendance: 1,500; Referee: İmankhan Sultani

28 September 2008 6	Karvan	2–1	Gabala	Yevlakh
16:30 AZST (UTC+5)	Nadirov 45'; Guliyev 79'	Summary	Tebloev 38'	Stadium: Yevlakh Stadium; Attendance: 4,000; Referee: Babek Guliyev

5 October 2008 7	Gabala	3–0	Bakili Baku	Qabala
16:00 AZST (UTC+5)	Nikolov 27' (pen.); Zargarov 57'; Hatami 90+2'	Summary		Stadium: Gabala City Stadium; Attendance: 700; Referee: Elchin Mammadov

18 October 2008 8	Olimpik Baku	1–0	Gabala	Baku
16:00 AZST (UTC+5)	Getsadze 4'	Summary		Stadium: Shafa Stadium; Attendance: 300; Referee: Vusal Aliyev

25 October 2008 9	Standard Baku	2–0	Gabala	Baku
16:00 AZST (UTC+5)	Gutierrez 1'; César 83'	Summary		Stadium: Shafa Stadium; Attendance: 200; Referee: Zöhrab Gadiyev

9 November 2008 10	Baku	3–0	Gabala	Baku
15:00 AZT (UTC+4)	Pérez 21'; Mujiri 54' (pen.), 74'	Summary		Stadium: Tofig Bakhramov Stadium; Attendance: 300; Referee: Vusal Aliyev

15 November 2008 11	Gabala	0–1	Khazar Lankaran	Qabala
14:00 AZT (UTC+4)		Summary	Abdullayev 48'	Stadium: Gabala City Stadium; Attendance: 1,000; Referee: Zohrab Gadiyev

23 November 2008 12	Gabala	0–0	Simurq	Qabala
14:00 AZT (UTC+4)		Summary		Stadium: Gabala City Stadium; Attendance: 950; Referee: Azad Mutallimov

29 November 2008 13	Turan Tovuz	0–0	Gabala	Tovuz
14:00 AZT (UTC+4)		Summary	A.Gasimov (red card) 40'	Stadium: Tovuz City Stadium; Attendance: 500; Referee: Elchin Mammadov

14 February 2009 14	Mughan^{1}	0–4	Gabala	Salyan
18:30 AZT (UTC+4)		Summary	Camara 24'; Karimov 53', 90+2' (pen.); Hatami 78'	Stadium: Salyany Olympic Sport Complex Stadium; Attendance: 150

21 February 2009 15	Gabala	2–0	MOIK Baku	Qabala
14:00 AZT (UTC+4)	Aptsiauri 21'; Tebloev 34'	Summary		Stadium: Gabala City Stadium; Attendance: 500; Referee: Zohrab Gadiyev

1 March 2009 16	Neftchi Baku	0–0	Gabala	Baku
16:15 AZT (UTC+4)		Summary		Stadium: Tofig Bakhramov Stadium; Attendance: 600; Referee: Afgan Hamzayev

7 March 2009 17	Gabala	0–1	Inter Baku	Qabala
15:00 AZT (UTC+4)		Summary	Guglielmone 32'	Stadium: Gabala City Stadium; Attendance: 1,350; Referee: Fariz Yusifov

15 March 2009 18	Qarabağ	0–0	Gabala	Baku^{2}
14:30 AZT (UTC+4)		Summary		Stadium: Tofiq Bahramov Stadium; Attendance: 1,000; Referee: Rovshan Ahmadov

22 March 2009 19	Gabala	3–0	Karvan	Qabala
15:00 AZT (UTC+4)	Hatami 2'; Aptsiauri 79'; Karimov 80'; A.Hashimov (red card) 90'	Summary	Pereira (red card) 90'	Stadium: Gabala City Stadium; Attendance: 2,000; Referee: Elchin Mammadov

4 April 2009 20	Bakili Baku	0–1	Gabala	Baku
16:00 AZST (UTC+5)		Summary	Hatami 63'; Karimov (penalty missed)	Stadium: Shafa Stadium; Attendance: 150; Referee: Amrah İbrahimov

12 April 2009 21	Gabala	1–1	Olimpik Baku	Qabala
16:00 AZST (UTC+5)	Hatami 50'	Summary	Gomes 86'	Stadium: Gabala City Stadium

18 April 2009 22	Gabala	2–1	Standard Baku	Qabala
16:00 AZST (UTC+5)	Comleonoc 65' (pen.); Zargarov 90+2'	Summary	Gutierrez 72'	Stadium: Gabala City Stadium; Attendance: 1,000; Referee: Elchin Mammadov

26 April 2009 23	Gabala	0–1	Baku	Qabala
16:00 AZST (UTC+5)		Summary	Batista 74'	Stadium: Gabala City Stadium; Attendance: 2,000; Referee: Fariz Yusifov

3 May 2009 24	Khazar Lankaran	1–2	Gabala	Lankaran
18:00 AZST (UTC+5)	Tsvetkov 25'	Summary	Aptsiauri 76'; Ostap 79' (pen.)	Attendance: 6,000; Referee: RovshanAhmadov

11 May 2009 25	Simurq	1–0	Gabala	Zaqatala
20:00 AZST (UTC+5)	Mazyar 84'	Summary	Aptsiauri (yellow card) 77' (yellow-red card) 77'	Stadium: Zaqatala City Stadium; Attendance: 700; Referee: Azad Mutallimov

17 May 2009 26	Gabala	0–1	Turan Tovuz	Qabala
18:00 AZST (UTC+5)		Summary	Ismayilov 16' (pen.)	Stadium: Gabala City Stadium; Attendance: 500; Referee: Afgan Hamzayev

==== Table ====
Pos	Team	Pld	W	D	L	GF	GA	GD	Pts
8	Neftçi Baku	26	9	9	8	30	21	+9	36
9	Karvan	26	10	4	12	28	33	−5	34
10	Gabala	26	9	6	11	28	21	+7	33
11	Turan	26	5	5	16	19	45	−26	20
12	Mughan	26	4	2	20	19	53	−34	14

Source: Soccerway.com
Rules for classification: 1) points; 2) goal difference; 3) number of goals scored.

=== Azerbaijan Cup ===
29 October 2008 Round of 16 1st Leg	Gabala	2 - 1	Turan Tovuz	Qabala
15:00 AZT (UTC+4)	Karimov 79', 83'	Summary	Hüseynov 76'	Stadium: Gabala City Stadium

5 November 2008 Round of 16 2nd Leg	Turan Tovuz	1 - 2 (2 - 4 agg.)	Gabala	Tovuz
14:00 AZT (UTC+4)	Akpan 46'	Summary	Karimov 79', 83'	Stadium: Tovuz City Stadium

25 February 2009 Quarterfinals 1st Leg	Gabala	1 - 1	Olimpik Baku	Qabala
14:00 AZT (UTC+4)	Karimov 67' (pen.)	Summary	Mogaadi 35' (pen.)	Stadium: Gabala City Stadium

11 March 2009 Quarterfinals 2nd Leg	Olimpik Baku	0 - 1 (1 - 2 agg.)	Gabala	Baku
15:00 AZT (UTC+4)		Summary	Hatami 66'	Stadium: Shafa Stadium

29 April 2009 Semifinals 1st Leg	Inter Baku	5 - 0	Gabala	Baku
16:00 AZST (UTC+5)	Guglielmone 5', 12' (pen.); Zlatinov 8'; Accioly 61'; Testemiţanu 76'	Summary		Stadium: Shafa Stadium

6 May 2009 Semifinals 2nd Leg	Gabala	2 - 0 (2 - 5 agg.)	Inter Baku	Qabala
16:00 AZST (UTC+5)	Karimov 41'; Gasimov 89'	Summary		Stadium: Gabala City Stadium

== Squad statistics ==
=== Appearances and goals ===
No.	Pos	Nat	Player	Total		Premier League		Azerbaijan Cup	
No.	Pos	Nat	Player	Apps	Goals	Apps	Goals	Apps	Goals
1	GK	(Azerbaijan) AZE	Elnar Karimov	6	0	6	0	0	0
3	MF	(Russia) RUS	Anatoli Tebloev	14	3	14	3	0	0
5	DF	(Azerbaijan) AZE	Mikayil Namazov	11	0	11	0	0	0
6	MF	(Guinea) GUI	Abdoul Kader Camara	22	1	22	1	0	0
7	MF	(Azerbaijan) AZE	Yashar Abuzerov	9	0	9	0	0	0
8	MF	(Azerbaijan) AZE	Matlab Mamedov	11	0	11	0	0	0
9	FW	(Poland) POL	Tomasz Stolpa	4	0	4	0	0	0
10	FW	(Azerbaijan) AZE	Kanan Karimov	9	0	9	0	0	0
11	MF	(Moldova) MDA	Anatolie Ostap	12	1	12	1	0	0
12	GK	(Latvia) LAT	Pāvels Doroševs	9	0	9	0	0	0
14	FW	(Iran) IRI	Farzad Hatami	9	0	9	0	0	0
15	DF	(Azerbaijan) AZE	Vurğun Hüseynov	10	0	10	0	0	0
16	MF	(Moldova) MDA	Victor Comleonoc	10	1	10	1	0	0
17	MF	(Georgia (country)) GEO	Tornike Aptsiauri	22	3	22	3	0	0
18	MF	(Azerbaijan) AZE	Goga Beraia	16	0	16	0	0	0
19	DF	(Azerbaijan) AZE	Vugar Hasanov	11	0	11	0	0	0
20	MF	(Azerbaijan) AZE	Anar Gasimov	11	0	11	0	0	0
21	MF	(Azerbaijan) AZE	Azer Hashimov	15	0	15	0	0	0
22	FW	(Azerbaijan) AZE	Parvin Pashayev	9	0	9	0	0	0
23	FW	(Azerbaijan) AZE	Rahman Musayev	9	0	9	0	0	0
24	MF	(Turkmenistan) TKM	Mekan Nasyrow	8	0	8	0	0	0
25	MF	(Azerbaijan) AZE	Samir Zargarov	24	3	24	3	0	0
Players who appeared for Gabala no longer at the club:
2	DF	(Brazil) BRA	Tiago	11	1	11	1	0	0
4	DF	(Serbia) SRB	Milija Žižić	15	0	15	0	0	0
5	DF	(Azerbaijan) AZE	Ali Ismaylov	10	0	10	0	0	0
7	MF	(Azerbaijan) AZE	Shahruz Mustafayev	2	0	2	0	0	0
10	MF	(Bulgaria) BUL	Asen Nikolov	10	1	10	1	0	0
12	GK	(Azerbaijan) AZE	Jahangir Hasanzade	11	0	11	0	0	0
15	DF	(Azerbaijan) AZE	Elnur Abbasov	4	0	4	0	0	0
16	FW	(Azerbaijan) AZE	Farrukh Ismayilov	9	0	9	0	0	0
18	MF	(Azerbaijan) AZE	Samir Mamedov	5	0	5	0	0	0
20	MF	(Azerbaijan) AZE	Vusal Huseynov	8	0	8	0	0	0

=== Goal scorers ===
Place	Position	Nation	Number	Name	Premier League	Azerbaijan Cup	Total
1	FW	(Azerbaijan)	10	Kanan Karimov	6	6	12
2	FW	(Iran)	14	Farzad Hatami	8	1	9
3	MF	(Russia)	3	Anatoli Tebloev	3	0	3
3	FW	(Azerbaijan)	25	Samir Zargarov	3	0	3
3	MF	(Georgia (country))	17	Tornike Aptsiauri	3	0	3
6	MF	(Bulgaria)	10	Asen Nikolov	1	0	1
6	MF	(Guinea)	6	Abdoul Kader Camara	1	0	1
6	DF	(Brazil)	2	Tiago	1	0	1
6	MF	(Moldova)	16	Victor Comleonoc	1	0	1
6	MF	(Moldova)	11	Anatolie Ostap	1	0	1
6	MF	(Azerbaijan)	24	Anar Gasimov	0	1	1
				TOTALS	28	8	36

== Notes ==
- On 31 October 2008, FK NBC Salyan changed their name to FK Mughan.
- Qarabağ have played their home games at the Tofiq Bahramov Stadium since 1993 due to the ongoing situation in Quzanlı.
