= 2006–07 Gabala FC season =

Gabala
2006–07 season
- Chairman: Taleh Heydərov
- Manager: Ramiz Mammadov
- Stadium: Gabala City Stadium
- Premier League: 11th
- Azerbaijan Cup: Round of 16
- Top goalscorer: League: Vusal Garaev (4); All: Vusal Garaev (6)
Home colours	Away colours

The Gabala FC 2006-07 season was Gabala FC's first Azerbaijan Premier League season, and their first season under manager Ramiz Mammadov. They finished the season in 11th place, whilst they also took part in the 2006–07 Azerbaijan Cup, which they were knocked out of in at the Last 16 stage by Baku.

== Squad ==
As of match played 22 May 2007

No.	Name	Nationality	Position	Date of birth (age)	Signed from	Signed in	Contract ends	Apps.	Goals
Goalkeepers
	Elnar Karimov	(Azerbaijan)	GK	5 April 1985 (aged 22)	Khazar Lankaran	2006			
	Rashad Mustafaev	(Azerbaijan)	GK	15 November 1976 (aged 30)		2006			
	Nadir Shukurov	(Azerbaijan)	GK	28 February 1967 (aged 40)	MKT Araz	2006			
	Khayal Zeynalov	(Azerbaijan)	GK	13 May 1982 (aged 25)	Olimpik Baku	2007			
Defenders
	Ali Abishov	(Azerbaijan)	DF	31 August 1968 (aged 38)	Shahdag Qusar	2005			
	Rahman Azizov	(Azerbaijan)	DF	2 July 1982 (aged 24)		2005			
	Azər Həşimov	(Azerbaijan)	DF	6 November 1984 (aged 22)	Energetik Mingəçevir	2005			
	Vugar Hasanov	(Azerbaijan)	DF			2006			
	Samir Mammadov	(Azerbaijan)	DF	20 October 1980 (aged 26)		2006			
	Subhi Məmmədov	(Azerbaijan)	DF		Kapaz	2006			
	Şəhruz Mustafayev	(Azerbaijan)	DF	8 September 1975 (aged 31)	Olimpik Baku	2007			
	Rashad Yusubov	(Azerbaijan)	DF	9 June 1984 (aged 22)		2005			
	Giorgi Krasovski	(Georgia (country))	DF	20 December 1979 (aged 27)	Torpedo Kutaisi	2006			
	Oleg Osadci	(Ukraine)	DF	8 February 1979 (aged 28)		2005			
	Vyaçeslav Sidoryuk	(Ukraine)	DF	21 February 1971 (aged 36)	Shahdag Qusar	2006			
Midfielders
	Elmir Aliev	(Azerbaijan)	MF	3 March 1981 (aged 26)	Olimpik Baku	2006			
	Vusal Garaev	(Azerbaijan)	MF	8 July 1986 (aged 20)	Turan Tovuz	2005			
	Ibrahim Huseynov	(Azerbaijan)	MF	6 August 1977 (aged 29)		2005			
	Ali Ismaylov	(Azerbaijan)	MF	19 December 1981 (aged 25)	Adliyya Baku	2005			
	Asif Mammadov	(Azerbaijan)	MF	5 August 1986 (aged 20)	Mil-Muğan	2007			
	Nail Mammadov	(Azerbaijan)	MF	1 March 1984 (aged 23)		2006			
	Eldeniz Suleymanov	(Azerbaijan)	MF	29 August 1975 (aged 31)	AMMK Baku	2006			
	Anar Veliev	(Azerbaijan)	MF	20 August 1979 (aged 27)	Olimpik Baku	2006			
	Samir Zərgərov	(Azerbaijan)	MF	29 August 1986 (aged 20)	Adliyya Baku	2006			
	Dmitri Kapanadze	(Georgia (country))	MF	26 May 1975 (aged 31)	Göyazan Qazakh	2006			
Forwards
	Vasif Äliyev	(Azerbaijan)	FW	13 May 1982 (aged 25)	Genclerbirliyi Sumqayit	2006			
	Rovshan Veliev	(Azerbaijan)	FW	4 January 1980 (aged 27)		2005			
	Dmitri Ditmarxusişvili	(Georgia (country))	FW			2006			
	Marius Humenike	(Romania)	FW	22 October 1977 (aged 29)	Shahdag Qusar	2006			
	Vitali Balamestny	(Russia)	FW	28 July 1980 (aged 26)	Dynamo Stavropol	2006			
Out on loan
Left during the season
	Sanan Gurbanov	(Azerbaijan)	FW	4 August 1980 (aged 26)	Shahdag Qusar	2006			

== Transfers ==
=== In ===
Date	Position	Nationality	Name	From	Fee	Ref.
Summer 2006	GK	(Azerbaijan)	Elnar Karimov	Khazar Lankaran	Undisclosed	
Summer 2006	GK	(Azerbaijan)	Nadir Shukurov	MKT Araz	Undisclosed	
Summer 2006	DF	(Azerbaijan)	Ali Abishov	Shahdag	Undisclosed	
Summer 2006	DF	(Azerbaijan)	Subhi Məmmədov	Kapaz	Undisclosed	
Summer 2006	DF	(Azerbaijan)	Şəhruz Mustafayev	Olimpik Baku	Undisclosed	
Summer 2006	DF	(Romania)	Marius Humenike	Shahdag	Undisclosed	
Summer 2006	MF	(Azerbaijan)	Anar Vəliyev	Olimpik Baku	Undisclosed	
Summer 2006	MF	(Azerbaijan)	Elmir Aliev	Olimpik Baku	Undisclosed	
Summer 2006	MF	(Azerbaijan)	Vusal Garaev	Turan Tovuz	Undisclosed	
Summer 2006	MF	(Georgia (country))	Dmitri Kapanadze	Göyazan Qazakh	Undisclosed	
Summer 2006	MF	(Ukraine)	Vyacheslav Sidoryuk	Shahdag	Undisclosed	
Summer 2006	FW	(Azerbaijan)	Vasif Äliyev	Gänclärbirliyi Sumqayit	Undisclosed	
Summer 2006	FW	(Azerbaijan)	Sanan Gurbanov	Shahdag	Undisclosed	
Summer 2006	FW	(Russia)	Vitali Balamestny	Dynamo Stavropol	Undisclosed	
Winter 2007	GK	(Azerbaijan)	Khayal Zeynalov	Olimpik Baku	Undisclosed	
Winter 2007	DF	(Georgia (country))	Giorgi Krasovski	Torpedo Kutaisi	Undisclosed	
Winter 2007	MF	(Azerbaijan)	Asif Mammadov	MKT Araz	Undisclosed	

=== Out ===
Date	Position	Nationality	Name	From	Fee	Ref.
Winter 2007	FW	(Azerbaijan)	Sanan Gurbanov	Olimpik Baku	Undisclosed	

=== Released ===
Date	Position	Nationality	Name	Joined	Date	Ref
Summer 2007	GK	(Azerbaijan)	Khayal Zeynalov	ABN Bärdä		
Summer 2007	GK	(Azerbaijan)	Nadir Shukurov	Karvan		
Summer 2007	DF	(Azerbaijan)	Rəşad Yusubov			
Summer 2007	DF	(Georgia (country))	Giorgi Krasovski	Mglebi Zugdidi		
Summer 2007	DF	(Romania)	Marius Humenike			
Summer 2007	DF	(Ukraine)	Oleg Osadci			
Summer 2007	MF	(Azerbaijan)	Elmir Alıyev			
Summer 2007	MF	(Azerbaijan)	Vusal Garaev	Turan Tovuz		
Summer 2007	MF	(Azerbaijan)	Asif Mammadov	Standard Baku		
Summer 2007	MF	(Azerbaijan)	Nail Məmmədov	ABN Barda		
Summer 2007	MF	(Azerbaijan)	Anar Vəliyev	Viləş Masallı		
Summer 2007	MF	(Georgia (country))	Dmitri Kapanadze			
Summer 2007	MF	(Ukraine)	Vyacheslav Sidoryuk			
Summer 2007	FW	(Azerbaijan)	Vasif Äliyev	Baku		
Summer 2007	FW	(Azerbaijan)	Senan Gurbanov	Olimpik Baku		
Summer 2007	FW	(Azerbaijan)	Rovshan Veliev			
Summer 2007	FW	(Georgia (country))	Dmitri Ditmarxusişvili			

== Competitions ==
=== Overview ===
Competition	First match	Last match	Starting round	Final position	Record							
Competition	First match	Last match	Starting round	Final position	Pld	W	D	L	GF	GA	GD	Win %
Top League	5 August 2006	22 May 2007	Matchday 1	11th	24	4	4	16	17	47	−30	16.67
Azerbaijan Cup	11 September 2006	2 December 2006	Round of 32	Last 16	4	2	0	2	11	5	+6	50.00
Total					28	6	4	18	28	52	−24	21.43

Last updated: 22 May 2007
Source: Competitions

=== Top League ===
==== Results summary ====
Overall								Home						Away					
Pld	W	D	L	GF	GA	GD	Pts	W	D	L	GF	GA	GD	W	D	L	GF	GA	GD
24	4	4	16	17	47	−30	16	2	2	8	6	20	−14	2	2	8	11	27	−16

Last updated: 13 August 2011.
Source: Soccerway

==== Results by round ====
Round	1	2	3	4	5	6	7	8	9	10	11	12	13	14	15	16	17	18	19	20	21	22	23	24
Ground	H	A	H	A	H	A	H	A	H	A	H	A	A	H	A	H	H	A	H	A	H	A	H	A
Result	D	L	L	W	L	L	L	L	L	D	W	L	L	L	L	D	L	L	L	D	L	W	W	L
Position																							11	11

Source: Soccerway
A = Away; H = Home; W = Win; D = Draw; L = Loss

==== Results ====
5 August 2006 1	Gabala	0–0	Inter Baku	Qabala
		Summary		Stadium: Gabala City Stadium

11 August 2006 2	MKT Araz	4–1	Gabala	Imishli
	Mämmädov 42'; Doroş 66'; Ağakişiyev 70', 89'	Summary	Garaev 90'	Stadium: Heydar Aliyev Stadium

20 August 2006 3	Gabala	0–2	Qarabağ	Qabala
		Summary	Kerimov 29'; Haqverdiyev 88'	Stadium: Gabala City Stadium

25 August 2006 4	Şahdağ	0–1	Gabala	Qusar
		Summary	Äliyev 5'	Stadium: Şövkət Orduxanov Stadium

18 September 2006 5	Gabala	1–4	Karvan	Qabala
	Huseynov 17' (pen.)	Summary	Ferreira 23', 29'; Muradov 40'; Bamba 77'	Stadium: Gabala City Stadium

30 September 2006 6	Neftchi Baku	4–1	Gabala	Baku
	Tagizade 9'; Abbasov 12'; Adamia 72'; Boreț 83'	Summary	Azizov 86'	Stadium: Tofik Bakhramov Stadium; Attendance: 2,000

23 October 2006 7	Gabala	1–2	Simurq	Qabala
	Azizov 65'	Summary	Mämmädov 2'; Näsibov 75'	Stadium: Gabala City Stadium

29 October 2006 8	Baku	1–0	Gabala	Baku
	Gogoberishvili 4'	Summary		Stadium: Tofig Bakhramov Stadium; Attendance: 500

4 November 2006 9	Gabala	0–3	Olimpik Baku	Qabala
		Summary	Mammadov 35'; Drobnjak 40'; Rzayev 87'	Stadium: Gabala City Stadium; Attendance: 500

9 November 2006 10	Turan Tovuz	0–0	Gabala	Tovuz
		[ Summary]		Stadium: Tovuz City Stadium

26 November 2006 11	Gabala	2–0	Gänclärbirliyi Sumqayit	Qabala
	Garaev 15' (pen.), 20'	[ Summary]		Stadium: Gabala City Stadium

8 December 2006 12	Khazar Lankaran	4–0	Gabala	Lankaran
	Abdullayev 17', 67'; Ramazanov 59'; Qurbanov 79'	[ Summary]		Stadium: Lankaran City Stadium; Attendance: 4,500

11 December 2006 13	Inter Baku	2–0	Gabala	Baku
	Axtyamov 48', 55'	[ Summary]		Stadium: Shafa Stadium

15 February 2007 14	Gabala	0–1	MKT Araz	Qabala
		[ Summary]	Yunisoğlu 75'	Stadium: Gabala City Stadium; Attendance: 250

21 February 2007 15	Qarabağ	3–2	Gabala	Baku
	Javadov 21'; K.Kerimov 25'; A.Kerimov 60'	[ Summary]	Äliyev 77'; Zargarov 82'	Stadium: Tofiq Bahramov Stadium^{2} Attendance: 500

16 March 2007 16	Gabala	0–0	Şahdağ	Qabala
		[ Summary]		Stadium: Gabala City Stadium; Attendance: 500

2 April 2007 17	Gabala	1–4	Neftchi Baku	Qabala
	Mammadov 90+1'	[ Summary]	Sadygov 50' (pen.); Subašić 56'; Adamia 65'; Näbiyev 90+2'	Stadium: Gabala City Stadium; Attendance: 300

7 April 2007 18	Simurq	3–1	Gabala	Zaqatala
	Nasibov 50', 59'; Ömärov 52'	[ Summary]	Balamestny 28'	Stadium: Zaqatala City Stadium; Attendance: 500

17 April 2007 19	Gabala	0–1	Baku	Qabala
		[ Summary]	Quliyev 55'	Stadium: Gabala City Stadium; Attendance: 200

27 April 2007 20	Karvan	3–3	Gabala	Yevlakh
	Vasilyev 22', 24' (pen.); Ferreira 80'	[ Summary]	Garaev 45'; Balamestny 60'; Mammadov 87'	Stadium: Yevlakh Stadium; Attendance: 500

2 May 2007 21	Olimpik Baku	3–1	Gabala	Baku
	Mammadov 25'; Bangoura 27'; Äliyev 62'	[ Summary]	Balamestny 33'	Stadium: Shafa Stadium; Attendance: 400

7 May 2007 22	Gabala	1–0	Turan Tovuz	Qabala
	Äliyev 65'	[ Summary]		Stadium: Gabala City Stadium; Attendance: 500

17 May 2007 23	Gänclärbirliyi Sumqayit	0–1	Gabala	Sumqayit
		[ Summary]	Mammadov 90'	Stadium: Mehdi Huseynzade Stadium; Attendance: 300

22 May 2007 24	Gabala	0–3	Khazar Lankaran	Qabala
		[ Summary]	Quliyev 5'; Abdullayev 22'; Ramazanov 41'	Stadium: Gabala City Stadium; Attendance: 1,000

==== Table ====
Pos	Team	Pld	W	D	L	GF	GA	GD	Pts	Qualification or relegation
9	Simurq	24	6	7	11	27	33	−6	25	
10	Turan	24	5	5	14	24	38	−14	20	
11	Gabala	24	4	4	16	17	47	−30	16	
12	Gänclärbirliyi Sumqayit	24	3	3	18	16	54	−38	12	
13	Şahdağ (R)	24	1	8	15	15	47	−32	11	Relegation to Azerbaijan First Division

Source: Azerbaijan Professional Football league
(R) Relegated

=== Azerbaijan Cup ===
11 September 2006 Round of 32 1st Leg	Shahdag Qudar	2–5	Gabala	Qusar
AZT (UTC+4)	Äliyev 9'; Hüseynov 38'		Zərgərov 6' (pen.); Osadci 16'; R.Veliev 56'; Garaev 57', 76'	Stadium: Şövkət Orduxanov Stadium

16 October 2006 Round of 32 2nd Leg	Gabala	6–0 (11–2 agg.)	Shahdag Qudar	Qabala
AZT (UTC+4)	Garaev; R.Veliev			Stadium: City Stadium

21 November 2006 Last 16 1st leg	Gabala	0–2	Baku	Qabala
AZT (UTC+4)			Megreladze 78'; Gomes 90+2'	Stadium: City Stadium; Attendance: 400

2 December 2006 Last 16 2nd Leg	Baku	1–0 (3–0 agg.)	Gabala	Baku
AZT (UTC+4)	Gomes 51'			Stadium: Tofig Bakhramov Stadium; Attendance: 100

== Squad statistics ==
As of match played 22 May 2007

=== Appearances and goals ===
No.	Pos	Nat	Player	Total		Premier League		Azerbaijan Cup	
No.	Pos	Nat	Player	Apps	Goals	Apps	Goals	Apps	Goals
	GK	(Azerbaijan) AZE	Elnar Karimov	3	0	3	0	0	0
	GK	(Azerbaijan) AZE	Rashad Mustafaev	1	0	1	0	0	0
	GK	(Azerbaijan) AZE	Nadir Shukurov	9	0	9	0	0	0
	GK	(Azerbaijan) AZE	Khayal Zeynalov	11	0	11	0	0	0
	DF	(Azerbaijan) AZE	Ali Abishov	11	0	11	0	0	0
	DF	(Azerbaijan) AZE	Rahman Azizov	10	2	10	2	0	0
	DF	(Azerbaijan) AZE	Azər Həşimov	21	0	21	0	0	0
	DF	(Azerbaijan) AZE	Vugar Hasanov	9	0	9	0	0	0
	DF	(Azerbaijan) AZE	Samir Mammadov	24	0	24	0	0	0
	DF	(Azerbaijan) AZE	Sabuhi Mamedov	20	0	20	0	0	0
	DF	(Azerbaijan) AZE	Şəhruz Mustafayev	7	0	7	0	0	0
	DF	(Azerbaijan) AZE	Rəşad Yusubov	5	0	5	0	0	0
	DF	(Georgia (country)) GEO	Gorgi Krasovski	11	0	11	0	0	0
	MF	(Ukraine) UKR	Oleg Osadci	4	0	4	0	0	0
	MF	(Ukraine) UKR	Vyaçeslav Sidoryuk	10	0	10	0	0	0
	MF	(Azerbaijan) AZE	Elmir Alıyev	2	0	2	0	0	0
	MF	(Azerbaijan) AZE	Vusal Garaev	20	4	20	4	0	0
	MF	(Azerbaijan) AZE	Ibrahim Huseynov	9	1	9	1	0	0
	MF	(Azerbaijan) AZE	Ali Ismaylov	15	0	15	0	0	0
	MF	(Azerbaijan) AZE	Asif Mammadov	9	3	9	3	0	0
	MF	(Azerbaijan) AZE	Nail Məmmədov	18	0	18	0	0	0
	MF	(Azerbaijan) AZE	Eldeniz Suleymanov	5	0	5	0	0	0
	MF	(Azerbaijan) AZE	Anar Vəliyev	6	0	6	0	0	0
	MF	(Azerbaijan) AZE	Samir Zərgərov	21	1	21	1	0	0
	MF	(Georgia (country)) GEO	Dmitri Kapanadze	11	0	11	0	0	0
	FW	(Azerbaijan) AZE	Vasif Äliyev	21	3	21	3	0	0
	FW	(Azerbaijan) AZE	Rovshan Veliev	8	0	8	0	0	0
	FW	(Georgia (country)) GEO	Dmitri Ditmarxusişvili	6	0	6	0	0	0
	FW	(Romania) ROU	Marius Humenike	4	0	4	0	0	0
	FW	(Russia) RUS	Vitali Balamestny	12	3	12	3	0	0
Players who appeared for Gabala no longer at the club:
	FW	(Azerbaijan) AZE	Sanan Gurbanov	13	0	13	0	0	0

=== Goal Scorers ===
Place	Position	Nation	Number	Name	Premier League	Azerbaijan Cup	Total
1	MF	(Azerbaijan)		Vusal Garaev	4	5	9
2	FW	(Azerbaijan)		Vasif Äliyev	3	0	3
2	MF	(Azerbaijan)		Asif Mammadov	3	0	3
2	FW	(Russia)		Vitali Balamestny	3	0	3
5	DF	(Azerbaijan)		Rahman Azizov	2	0	2
5	MF	(Azerbaijan)		Samir Zərgərov	1	1	2
5	DF	(Azerbaijan)		Rovshan Veliev	0	2	2
8	MF	(Azerbaijan)		Ibrahim Huseynov	2	0	2
8	MF	(Ukraine)		Oleg Osadci	1	1	2
				Unknown	0	2	2
				TOTALS	17	11	28
