= Ihor Melnyk (footballer, born 1983) =

Ukrainian footballer

Personal information
- Full name: Ihor Melnyk
- Date of birth: 5 March 1983 (age 43)
- Place of birth: Mykolaiv, Soviet Union (now Ukraine)
- Height: 1.90 m (6 ft 3 in)
- Position: Forward

Youth career
- 1998–2000: Torpedo Mykolaiv

Senior career*
Years	Team	Apps	(Gls)
2002–2005	Metalist Kharkiv	1	(0)
2002–2005	→ Metalist-2 Kharkiv	59	(7)
2005	Helios Kharkiv	14	(3)
2006–2007	Ihroservice Simferopol	51	(1)
2007–2009	Illichivets Mariupol	20	(3)
2007–2009	→ Illichivets-2 Mariupol	36	(22)
2009–2010	Gabala	27	(6)
2011–2014	Sumy	80	(16)
2015–2016	Bakhchisaray	25	(6)
2016–2017	Krymteplytsia Molodizhne	28	(13)
2017	TSK Simferopol	11	(0)
2018–2019	Gvardeyets Skvortsovo	23	(4)
- * Club domestic league appearances and goals

Ihor Melnyk (born 5 March 1983) is a Ukrainian football forward.

== Career ==
Melnyk started his career with Torpedo Mykolaiv before moving to Kharkiv with first Metalist Kharkiv and then a short spell at Helios Kharkiv. Melnyk then played for both Ihroservice Simferopol and Illichivets Mariupol before moving to Azerbaijan with Gabala on a one-year contract. In his only Season with Gabala, Melnyk scored 6 goals in 27 league games, finishing second in the club's goal scoring charts behind Tomasz Stolpa. Melnyk returned to Ukraine at the start of the 2011–12 season, signing with FC Sumy and helping them to promotion to the Ukrainian First League, as well as the league title, the same season.

== Career statistics ==
Club statistics
Season	Club	League	League		Cup		Other		Total	
Season	Club	League	App	Goals	App	Goals	App	Goals	App	Goals
2002–03	Metalist Kharkiv	Ukrainian Premier League	0	0	0	0	-		0	0
2003–04	Metalist Kharkiv	Ukrainian First League	1	0	1	0	-		2	0
2004–05	Metalist Kharkiv	Ukrainian Premier League	0	0	0	0	-		0	0
2005–06	Helios Kharkiv	Ukrainian First League	14	3	1	0	-		15	3
2005–06	Ihroservice Simferopol	Ukrainian First League	17	8	0	0	-		17	8
2006–07	Ihroservice Simferopol	Ukrainian First League	34	7	2	1	-		36	8
2007–08	Illichivets Mariupol	Ukrainian First League	11	2	1	0	-		12	2
2008–09	Illichivets Mariupol	Ukrainian Premier League	9	1	0	0	-		9	1
2009–10	Gabala	Azerbaijan Premier League	27	6		0	-		27	6
2011–12	Sumy	Ukrainian Second League	20	9	2	2	-		22	11
2012–13	Sumy	Ukrainian First League	32	4	0	0	-		32	4
2013–14	Sumy	Ukrainian First League	26	2	1	0	-		27	2
Total			191	42	8	3	0	0	199	45

== Honours ==
=== Team ===
FC Sumy

- Ukrainian Second League: (1) 2011–12
