= 2012 Gabala Cup =

2012 International Football Tournament of 1st Gabala Cup 2012 for U-15
Tournament details
- Host country: Azerbaijan
- Dates: May 30 - June 04
- Teams: 8 (from 1 confederation)

The 2012 Gabala Cup is an international football tournament for U-15 teams held in Azerbaijan.

== Participants ==
- (Spain) Villarreal
- (Spain) Levante
- (Turkey) Galatasaray
- (Netherlands) Feyenoord
- (Denmark) Brondby
- (Azerbaijan) Qarabağ
- (Azerbaijan) Gabala
- Serbia

== Format ==
The eight invited teams were split into two groups that played a round-robin tournament. On completion of this, the fourth placed teams in each group would play each other to determine seventh and eighth place, the third placed teams in each group would play each other to decide fifth and sixth place, the second placed teams in each group would play to determine third and fourth place and the winners of each group would compete for first and second place overall.

Points awarded in the group stage followed the standard formula of three points for a win, one point for a draw and zero points for a loss.

== Group A ==
Team	Pts	Pld	W	D	L	GF	GA	GD
(Turkey) Galatasaray	5	3	1	2	0	4	2	+2
(Denmark) Brondby	4	3	1	1	1	4	7	-3
(Spain) Villarreal	4	3	1	1	1	4	2	+2
(Azerbaijan) Gabala	3	3	1	0	2	6	7	-1

31 May 2012

(Azerbaijan) Gabala	6–2	(Denmark) Brondby

Jalə stadionu, Gabala

31 May 2012

(Turkey) Galatasaray	1–1	(Spain) Villarreal

Jalə stadionu, Gabala

31 May 2012

(Azerbaijan) Gabala	0–2	(Turkey) Galatasaray

Natura stadionu, Gabala

31 May 2012

(Denmark) Brondby	1–0	(Spain) Villarreal

Natura stadionu, Gabala

1 June 2012

(Azerbaijan) Gabala	0–3	(Spain) Villarreal

Jalə stadionu, Gabala

1 June 2012

(Denmark) Brondby	1–1	(Turkey) Galatasaray

Jalə stadionu, Gabala

== Group B ==
Team	Pts	Pld	W	D	L	GF	GA	GD
Serbia	9	3	3	0	0	13	1	+12
(Spain) Levante	6	3	2	0	1	6	3	+3
(Netherlands) Feyenoord	3	3	1	0	2	1	8	-7
(Azerbaijan) Qarabağ	0	3	0	0	3	1	9	-8

31 May 2012

(Azerbaijan) Qarabağ	1–2	(Spain) Levante

Natura stadionu, Gabala

31 May 2012

(Netherlands) Feyenoord	0–5	Serbia

Natura stadionu, Gabala

31 May 2012

(Azerbaijan) Qarabağ	0–1	(Netherlands) Feyenoord

Jalə stadionu, Gabala

31 May 2012

(Spain) Levante	1–2	Serbia

Jalə stadionu, Gabala

1 June 2012

(Azerbaijan) Qarabağ	0–6	Serbia

Natura stadionu, Gabala

1 June 2012

(Spain) Levante	3–0	(Netherlands) Feyenoord

Natura stadionu, Gabala
