= Nadir Shukurov =

Azerbaijani footballer (born 1967)

Personal information
- Full name: Nadir Shukurov
- Date of birth: February 28, 1967 (age 59)
- Height: 1.88 m (6 ft 2 in)
- Position: Goalkeeper

Senior career*
Years	Team	Apps	(Gls)
1992–1996	Kapaz	54	(0)
1996–1997	Polis Akademy Baku	28	(0)
1997–2001	Dinamo Baku	75	(0)
2001–2002	Qarabağ	13	(0)
2004–2006	MKT Araz	35	(0)
2006–2007	Gabala	9	(0)
2008–2009	Karvan	5	(0)

International career^{‡}
2000–2001	Azerbaijan	3	(0)
- * Club domestic league appearances and goals as of 16 October 2013 ‡ National team caps and goals as of 01 December 2009

Nadir Shukurov (born February 28, 1967) is an Azerbaijani former footballer.

During his career he played for Azerbaijani sides Baku, Qarabağ, MKT Araz, Gabala and Karvan. During his time with Karvan, on 19 April 2009, Shukurov became the oldest player to play in the Azerbaijan Premier League. Shukurov had initially retired at the end of the 2007–08 season, but had retained his playing registration in case he was called upon. Due to Karvan's injury problems at the time, he stepped in helped halt a seven-game losing streak in their 3–1 victory over Mughan.

== Career statistics ==
Club statistics
Season	Club	League	League		Cup		Other		Total	
Season	Club	League	App	Goals	App	Goals	App	Goals	App	Goals
Azerbaijan			League		Azerbaijan Cup		Europe		Total	
1992	Kapaz	Azerbaijan Premier League	8	0			-		8	0
1993	Kapaz	Azerbaijan Premier League	10	0			-		10	0
1993–94	Kapaz	Azerbaijan Premier League	14	0			-		14	0
1994–95	Kapaz	Azerbaijan Premier League	6	0			-		6	0
1995–96	Kapaz	Azerbaijan Premier League	16	0			2	0	18	0
1996–97	Polis Akademy Baku	Azerbaijan Premier League	28	0			-		28	0
1997–98	Dinamo Baku	Azerbaijan Premier League	13	0			-		13	0
1998–99	Dinamo Baku	Azerbaijan Premier League	32	0			1	0	33	0
1999–2000	Dinamo Baku	Azerbaijan Premier League	20	0			-		20	0
2000–01	Dinamo Baku	Azerbaijan Premier League	10	0			-		10	0
2001–02	Qarabağ	Azerbaijan Premier League	13	0			-		13	0
2004–05	FK MKT-Araz	Azerbaijan Premier League	29	0			-		29	0
2005–06	FK MKT-Araz	Azerbaijan Premier League	6	0			-		6	0
2006–07	Gabala	Azerbaijan Premier League	9	0			-		9	0
2008–09	Karvan	Azerbaijan Premier League	5	0			-		5	0
Total	Azerbaijan		219	0			3	0	222	0
Total			219	0			3	0	222	0

== National team statistics ==
As of 14 October 2013

Azerbaijan national team
Year	Apps	Goals
2000	1	0
2001	2	0
Total	3	0
