= Mekan Nasyrow =

Turkmenistan footballer (born 1982)

Mekan Nasyrov
Personal information
- Date of birth: 16 April 1982 (age 44)
- Place of birth: Mary, Turkmen SSR, Soviet Union
- Height: 1.76 m (5 ft 9 in)
- Position: Midfielder

Team information
- Current team: Merw FK (manager)

Senior career*
Years	Team	Apps	(Gls)
2001–2002	Şagadam Türkmenbaşy		(2)
2002–2003	Nisa Aşgabat		
2003–2004	Merw Mary		(3)
2004–2008	FK Karvan	58	(4)
2008–2009	Gabala	8	(0)
2009–2011	Persik Kediri	52	(3)
2011–2012	Persibo Bojonegoro	19	(2)
2012–2013	Barito Putera	29	(3)
2014	Merw FT		
2014	Barito Putera	23	(1)
2015–2016	Energetik		
2016–2017	Semen Padang F.C.	21	(1)

International career^{‡}
2003–2009	Turkmenistan	18	(4)
- * Club domestic league appearances and goals as of 9 January 2014 ‡ National team caps and goals as of 10 June 2009

Mekan Nasyrov (born 16 April 1982) is a Turkmenistan footballer who has formerly played for Persik Kediri, Barito Putera and Semen Padang.

== Career ==
In February 2009, Nasyrov signed for Gabala along with Victor Comleonoc and Pāvels Doroševs. Nasyrov made eight appearances for Gabala before leaving six-months later for Persik Kediri in Indonesia. In 2012 he joined PS Barito Putera, and Persik Kediri in 2013. He again joined PS Barito Putera in 2014, and later Semen Padang F.C.

== International career ==
He is a member of the Turkmenistan national football team.

== Club career statistics ==
As of 9 January 2014.

Club performance			League		Cup		League Cup		Total	
Season	Club	League	Apps	Goals	Apps	Goals	Apps	Goals	Apps	Goals
Turkmenistan			League		Turkmenistan Cup		League Cup		Total	
2002	Şagadam Türkmenbaşy	Ýokary Liga	?	2	?	?	-		?	2
2003	Şagadam Türkmenbaşy	Ýokary Liga	?	?	?	0	-		?	0
2003	Nisa Aşgabat	Ýokary Liga	?	?	?	0	-		?	0
2004	Merw Mary	Ýokary Liga	?	3	?	0	-		?	3
Azerbaijan			League		Azerbaijan Cup		League Cup		Total	
2004–05	FK Karvan	Top League	29	4			-		29	4
2005–06	FK Karvan	Top League	5	0			-		5	0
2006–07	FK Karvan	Top League	5	0			-		5	0
2007–08	FK Karvan	Premier League	19	0			-		19	0
2008–09	Gabala	Premier League	8	0			-		8	0
Indonesia			League		Piala Indonesia		League Cup		Total	
2009–10	Persik Kediri	Super League	28	1	7	0	-		35	1
2010–11	Persik Kediri	Premier Division	21	0	-		-		21	0
2011–12	Persibo Bojonegoro	Premier League	15	1	6	1	-		21	2
2013	Barito Putera	Super League	29	0	0	0	-		29	0
Total	Turkmenistan		?	5	?	0	-		?	5
Total	Azerbaijan		66	4	?	0	-		66	4
Total	Indonesia		93	2	13	1	-		106	3
Career total			159	11	13	1	-		172	12

== International career statistics ==
=== Goals for senior national team ===
Scores and results list Turkmenistan's goal tally first.

#	Date	Venue	Opponent	Score	Result	Competition
1.	28 October 2007	Saparmurat Turkmenbashi Olympic Stadium, Ashgabat, Turkmenistan	Cambodia	1–1	4–1	2010 FIFA World Cup qualification
2.	18 November 2007	Saparmurat Turkmenbashi Olympic Stadium, Ashgabat, Turkmenistan	Hong Kong	1–0	3–0	2010 FIFA World Cup qualification
3.	14 April 2009	National Football Stadium, Malé, Maldives	Maldives	1–0	3–1	2010 AFC Challenge Cup qualification
4.	18 April 2009	National Football Stadium, Malé, Maldives	Philippines	3–0	5–0	2010 AFC Challenge Cup qualification

== Honours ==
Şagadam Türkmenbaşy

- Ýokary Liga: 2002

Nisa Aşgabat

- Ýokary Liga: 2003

Persibo Bojonegoro

- Piala Indonesia: 2012
