= Paulino Tavares =

Portuguese footballer

Personal information
- Date of birth: 10 December 1984 (age 41)
- Place of birth: Lisbon, Portugal
- Height: 1.73 m (5 ft 8 in)
- Position: Midfielder

Team information
- Current team: FC Saint-Leu 95

Youth career
- –1996: Cultural Pontinha
- 1996–01: Benfica

Senior career*
Years	Team	Apps	(Gls)
2001–2004	Campomaiorense		
2004–2006	Créteil		
2006–2007	Levallois SC		
2007	Villemomble Sports	17	(1)
2008–2009	Trelleborg	20	(3)
2009	Gabala	14	(2)
2011–2012	Aubervilliers	21	(1)
2012–2013	Viry-Châtillon	18	(1)
2013–2014	Aubervilliers	7	(0)
2014–2015	Lusitanos Saint-Maur		
2015–2016	AS Beauvais	17	(0)
2017–2018	Aubervilliers	5	(0)
2019–	FC Saint-Leu 95	1	(0)
- * Club domestic league appearances and goals as of 18:49, 30 November 2019 (UTC)

Paulino Lopes Tavares (born 10 December 1984) is a Portuguese footballer who plays as a midfielder for FC Saint-Leu 95 in the Championnat National 3.

== Career ==
Tavares was born in Lisbon. In December 2007 he went on trial with Trelleborg of the Swedish Allsvenskan. Following his trial he signed a two-year contract with the club. In January 2010, after his contract Trelleborgs had expired, Tavares joined Gabala FK of the Azerbaijan Premier League. Following 14 league appearances and 2 goals, Tavares left Gabala for FCM Aubervilliers in France. In October 2012, Tavares moved from Aubervilliers to ES Viry-Châtillon. He returned to Aubervilliers for the 2013–14 season before signing for US Lusitanos Saint-Maur at the sixth level of French football in July 2014. Whilst there he was part of the team that reached the Round of 64 in the Coupe de France, most notable scoring twice in a 4–3 victory against Ligue 2 side US Créteil-Lusitanos in the seventh round. After achieving promotion at the end of the season, Tavares left Saint-Maur and signed for AS Beauvais Oise in Championnat de France Amateur 2.

For the 2017–18 season, Tavares rejoined Aubervilliers for a third time.
