= Victor Comleonoc =

Moldovan footballer

Personal information
- Full name: Victor Comleonoc
- Date of birth: 23 February 1979 (age 47)
- Place of birth: Soviet Union
- Height: 1.70 m (5 ft 7 in)
- Position: Midfielder

Senior career*
Years	Team	Apps	(Gls)
1995–2000	Constructorul Chişinău	109	(33)
2001–2004	FC Sheriff Tiraspol	73	(12)
2004	Spartak Ivano-Frankivsk	15	(1)
2005	Tiligul Tiraspol	7	(2)
2005	FC Dacia Chişinău	1	(0)
2005–2007	Obolon Kyiv	58	(5)
2007–2008	FC SKA Rostov-on-Don	15	(0)
2009	Gabala	10	(1)
2009–2010	Obolon Kyiv	10	(0)
2010	Akzhayik	17	(1)
2011	Iskra-Stal	1	(0)
2012–2013	FC Dacia Chișinău	7	(1)

International career^{‡}
2001–2009	Moldova	19	(0)
- * Club domestic league appearances and goals as of 9 January 2014 ‡ National team caps and goals as of 22 November 2013

Victor Comleonoc (Russian: Виктор Комлёнок, born 23 February 1979) is a Moldovan footballer who last played for Moldovan National Division side FC Dacia Chișinău.

== Career ==
In February 2009, Comleonoc signed for Gabala along with Mekan Nasyrow and Pāvels Doroševs. Comleonoc scored once in his ten games for Gabala before he left for Obolon Kyiv six-months later.

== International career ==
Comleonoc has made 19 appearances for the Moldova national football team He played four games in UEFA Euro 2008 qualifying.

== Career statistics ==
Club statistics
Season	Club	League	League		Cup		Europe		Total	
Season	Club	League	App	Goals	App	Goals	App	Goals	App	Goals
1995–96	Constructorul Chişinău	Divizia Naţională	8	2			-		8	2
1996-97	Constructorul Chişinău	Divizia Naţională	26	12			3	0	29	12
1997-98	Constructorul Chişinău	Divizia Naţională	24	12			2	1	26	13
1998–99	Constructorul Chişinău	Divizia Naţională	15	0			2	0	17	0
1999–2000	Constructorul Chişinău	Divizia Naţională	29	7			2	1	31	8
2000–01	Constructorul Chişinău	Divizia Naţională	7	0			2	0	9	0
2000–01	Sheriff Tiraspol	Divizia Naţională	14	3			-		14	3
2001–02	Sheriff Tiraspol	Divizia Naţională	25	3			4	1	29	4
2002-03	Sheriff Tiraspol	Divizia Naţională	21	6			4	0	25	6
2003-04	Sheriff Tiraspol	Divizia Naţională	13	0			1	0	14	0
2004-05	Spartak Ivano-Frankivsk	Ukrainian First League	15	1			-		15	1
2004-05	Tiligul-Tiras Tiraspol	Divizia Naţională	7	2			-		7	2
2005-06	Dacia Chișinău	Divizia Naţională	1	0			1	0	2	0
2005–06	Obolon Kyiv	Ukrainian First League	32	3			-		32	3
2006–07	Obolon Kyiv	Ukrainian First League	26	2			—		26	2
2007	SKVO Rostov	RNFL	15	1			-		15	1
2008	SKVO Rostov	RNFL	21	0			—		21	0
2008–09	Gabala	Azerbaijan Premier League	10	1			—		10	1
2009-10	Obolon Kyiv	Ukrainian Premier League	11	0	2	0	-		13	0
2010	Akzhayik	Kazakhstan Premier League	17	1			-		17	1
2011-12	Iskra-Stal Rîbniţa	Divizia Naţională	1	0			0	0	1	0
2012-13	Dacia Chișinău	Divizia Naţională	7	1			0	0	7	1
Total	Moldova		198	48			21	3	219	51
Total	Ukraine		84	6			0	0	84	6
Total	Russia		36	1			0	0	36	1
Total	Azerbaijan		10	1			0	0	10	1
Total	Kazakhstan		17	1			0	0	17	1
Total			345	57			21	3	366	60
