= Velichko Velichkov =

Bulgarian footballer

Personal information
- Full name: Velichko Mitkov Velichkov
- Date of birth: 24 November 1986 (age 39)
- Place of birth: Topolovgrad, Bulgaria
- Height: 1.90 m (6 ft 3 in)
- Position: Centre-back

Youth career
- Sakarski sportist

Senior career*
Years	Team	Apps	(Gls)
2004–2006	FC St. Karadzha	61	(6)
2006–2008	Botev Plovdiv	54	(3)
2009–2010	Sliven 2000	12	(0)
2010–2011	Gabala FK	4	(0)
2011	Svilengrad 1921	10	(0)
2012–2013	Lyubimets 2007	35	(0)
2014	Slavia Sofia	6	(0)
2014–2015	PFC Burgas	24	(0)
2015	Neftochimic Burgas	5	(0)
2016	New Radiant		
2017–2018	Victory		
2018–2019	Maritsa Plovdiv		
2019	Oborishte		
2020	Lokomotiv GO	3	(0)
2020–2022	Maritsa Plovdiv	8	(1)
- * Club domestic league appearances and goals

Velichko Velichkov (Bulgarian Cyrillic: Величко Величков; born 24 November 1986) is a Bulgarian former professional footballer who played as a centre-back.

== Career ==
Velichkov started his career in home town Elhovo in local team FC Stefan Karadzha. With this team he played three years in Bulgarian amateur division. Because of his good displays Velichkov caught eye of Botev scouts. As his contract with Karadzha expired in August 2006, he made a move to Botev Plovdiv with a free transfer.

=== Botev ===
Velichkov made his official debut for Botev in a match against CSKA Sofia on 1 October 2006. He played for 90 minutes. The result of the match was 1–0 with win for Botev. On 2 September 2007. he scored his first goal for Botev against Lokomotiv Sofia. He scored goal in 66th minute for 2–1 for Botev. The result of the match was 2–2.

=== Sliven ===
In January 2009 Velichkov transferred to OFC Sliven 2000. He made his competitive debut on 21 March in a match against Slavia Sofia.

=== Gabala ===
Shortly before the 2010 transfer window closed, Velichkov signed a one-year contract with Gabala FC of the Azerbaijan Premier League.

=== Maritsa Plovdiv ===
On 10 June 2018, Velichkov joined Maritsa Plovdiv.

== Career statistics ==
As of 24 January 2014

Club statistics
Season	Club	League	League		Cup		Other		Total	
Season	Club	League	App	Goals	App	Goals	App	Goals	App	Goals
2006–07	Botev Plovdiv	A PFG	18	0			-		18	0
2007–08	Botev Plovdiv	A PFG	21	2			-		21	2
2008–09	Botev Plovdiv	A PFG	11	0			-		11	0
2008–09	Sliven	A PFG	10	0			-		10	0
2009–10	Sliven	A PFG	2	0			-		2	0
2009–10	Gabala	Azerbaijan Premier League	4	0			-		4	0
2010–11	Gabala	Azerbaijan Premier League	0	0	0	0	-		0	0
2011–12	Svilengrad	V AFG	10	0			-		10	0
2011–12	Lyubimets 2007	B PFG	5	0			-		5	0
2012–13	Lyubimets 2007	B PFG	15	0			-		15	0
2013–14	Lyubimets 2007	A PFG	15	0	1	1	-		16	1
Total	Bulgaria		107	2	1	1	-		108	3
Total	Azerbaijan		4	0			-		4	0
Total			111	2	1	1	0	0	112	2
