= Anatolie Ostap =

Moldovan footballer (born 1979)

Personal information
- Date of birth: 22 November 1979 (age 46)
- Height: 1.80 m (5 ft 11 in)
- Position: Midfielder

Senior career*
Years	Team	Apps	(Gls)
2001–2003	Agro-Goliador Chişinău		
2004	Tiligul-Tiras Tiraspol		
2004	Nistru Otaci		
2005	Tobol		
2006	Mash’al Mubarek		
2006–2007	Žalgiris Vilnius	39	(3)
2008	Vetra	20	(3)
2009–2010	Gabala	31	(1)
2010–2013	Banga Gargždai	17	(2)

International career
	Moldova U16	2	(0)
	Moldova U21	3	(0)
- * Club domestic league appearances and goals

Anatolie Ostap (born 22 November 1979) is a Moldovan former professional footballer who played as a midfielder. He played for Žalgiris Vilnius, Vetra and Banga Gargždai in Lithuania, Gabala in Azerbaijan, Mash’al Mubarek in Uzbekistan, Tobol in Kazakhstan and Nistru Otaci, Tiligul-Tiras Tiraspol and Agro-Goliador Chişinău in his native Moldova.

== Club career ==
=== Gabala ===
In January 2009 Ostap signed for Azerbaijan Premier League side Gabala. In the summer of 2010 Ostap left Gabala after playing 31 league games for the club and scoring 1 goal.

=== Banga Gargždai ===
Following his release from Gabala, Ostap returned to Lithuania and signed for Banga Gargždai. After 17 league games spanning two years, he had his contract cancelled by Banga Gargždai.

== International career ==
Ostap played twice for the Moldovan Under-16 team and three times for their under-21 team.

== Career statistics ==
As of 7 October 2013

Club performance			League		Cup		Continental		Total	
Season	Club	League	Apps	Goals	Apps	Goals	Apps	Goals	Apps	Goals
Lithuania			League		Lithuanian Cup		Europe		Total	
2006	Žalgiris Vilnius	A Lyga	13	0			-		13	0
2007	Žalgiris Vilnius	A Lyga	26	3			-		26	3
2008	Vėtra	A Lyga	20	3			-		20	3
Azerbaijan			League		Azerbaijan Cup		Europe		Total	
2008–09	Gabala	Azerbaijan Premier League	12	1			-		12	1
2009–10	Gabala	Azerbaijan Premier League	19	0			-		19	0
Lithuania			League		Lithuanian Cup		Europe		Total	
2010	Banga Gargždai	A Lyga	7	1			2	1	9	2
2011	Banga Gargždai	A Lyga	4	1			1	0	5	1
2012	Banga Gargždai	A Lyga	6	0			-		6	0
Total	Azerbaijan		31	1			-		31	1
Total	Lithuania		76	8			3	1	79	9
Career total			107	9			3	1	110	10
