= Faig Jabbarov =

Azerbaijani footballer (born 1972)

Personal information
- Full name: Faiq Cabbarov
- Date of birth: 26 June 1972
- Place of birth: Ganja, Azerbaijani SSR
- Position: Defender

Senior career*
Years	Team	Apps	(Gls)
1990	Avtomobilist Evlakh	1	(0)
1990	Kyapaz Kirovabad	18	(0)
1991	Dinamo Kirovabad	1	(0)
1991–1992	Neftchi Baku	43	(2)
1993–1999	Kapaz	164	(19)
1999–2001	Shamkir	22	(1)
2001–2002	Shafa Baku	4	(0)
2003–2004	Shamkir	6	(0)
2004–2005	Kapaz	6	(0)
Total		265	(22)

International career
1993–1998	Azerbaijan	21	(0)
- * Club domestic league appearances and goals

Faig Jabbarov (Azerbaijani: Faiq Cabbarov, 26 June 1972) is an Azerbaijani footballer.

== Honours ==
=== Individual ===
- Azerbaijani Footballer of the Year (1): 1997
