= Sanan Gurbanov =

Azerbaijani footballer and manager (born 1980)

Personal information
- Full name: Sanan Gurbanov
- Date of birth: 4 August 1980 (age 46)
- Place of birth: Georgian SSR
- Height: 1.86 m (6 ft 1 in)
- Position: Striker

Senior career*
| Years | Team | Apps | (Gls) |
| 1997–1998 | Qarabağ | 2 | |
| 1998–1999 | Shafa Baku | 1 | |
| 1999–2001 | Baku | 27 | |
| 2002 | Shafa Baku | 7 | |
| 2002–2003 | Saipa | | |
| 2003–2004 | Shafa Baku | 18 | (12) |
| 2004–2005 | Mil-Muğan | 11 | (2) |
| 2005–2006 | Shahdağ | 9 | (0) |
| 2006 | Gabala | 13 | (0) |
| 2007 | Olimpik Baku | | |
| 2007–2008 | ABN Bärdä | 10 | (1) |
| 2008 | MOIK Baku | 7 | (0) |
| 2009 | Muğan | 9 | (2) |

International career
| 2004 | Azerbaijan | 1 | (0) |

Managerial career
- 2012–2018: Gabala (assistant)
- 2014: Gabala (Interim)
- 2018–2019: Gabala
- 2021-: Keşla
- * Club domestic league appearances and goals

Sanan Gurbanov (Azerbaijani: Sənan Qurbanov, born 4 August 1980) is a retired Azerbaijani footballer and current manager of Keşla FK.

== Career ==
=== Club ===
He was born in Georgia on 4 August 1980. Moving to Baku with his family in his 1st year, Sanan began to develop his football career in the city of winds. He got into professional football by Azerbaijan”s Garabagh, Shafa, Baku, MKT-Araz, Shahdagh, Gabala, ABN-Barda, MOIK and Mughan, as well as Saypa of Iran. Being capitalized with his possession of air shots, heads and high sense of scoring, the striker was subjected to leave soccer before his real time, but he still stuck to the job he loves. Having the B class of UEFA, he worked as a coach for 3 years and joined Gabala”s A team as an assistant coach since 2012. But his time with Gabala goes a bit more back to when he started as a trainer for lower age groups of the Gabala Football Academy. Before joining Gabala, Sanan worked for Neftchi ISM that were playing in the First Division.

=== Managerial ===
Having previously manager Gabala FK in an Interim position in December 2014, following the sacking of Dorinel Munteanu, Gabala appointed Gurbanov on a two-year contract on 30 On 30 May 2018 after Roman Hryhorchuk had left Gabala the previous day. On 31 August 2019, Gurbanov resigned as manager following Gabala's 4–0 defeat at home to Keşla.

25 January 2021, Gurbanov was appointed as manager of Keşla.
