= Vusal Garaev =

Azerbaijani footballer (born 1986)

Personal information
- Full name: Vusal Garaev
- Date of birth: 8 July 1986 (age 40)
- Place of birth: Azerbaijan
- Height: 1.81 m (5 ft 11 in)
- Position: Forward

Team information
- Current team: Turan Tovuz
- Number: 21

Senior career*
Years	Team	Apps	(Gls)
2003–2006	Turan Tovuz	35	(2)
2006–2007	Gabala	20	(4)
2007–2009	Turan Tovuz	30	(7)
2009	Mughan	13	(0)
2009–2012	AZAL	37	(3)
2012	Ravan Baku	17	(1)
2015–	Turan Tovuz		
- * Club domestic league appearances and goals as of 16 January 2016

Vusal Garaev (born 1986) is an Azerbaijani football forward playing for Turan in the Azerbaijan First Division.

== Career statistics ==
As of 16 December 2013

Club performance			League		Cup		Continental		Total	
Season	Club	League	Apps	Goals	Apps	Goals	Apps	Goals	Apps	Goals
Azerbaijan			League		Azerbaijan Cup		Europe		Total	
2003-04	Turan Tovuz	Azerbaijan Premier League	20	1			-		20	1
2004-05	Turan Tovuz	Azerbaijan Premier League	5	0			-		5	0
2005-06	Turan Tovuz	Azerbaijan Premier League	10	1			-		10	1
2006-07	Gabala	Azerbaijan Premier League	20	4		5	-		20	9
2007-08	Turan Tovuz	Azerbaijan Premier League	23	6			-		23	6
2008-09	Turan Tovuz	Azerbaijan Premier League	7	1			-		7	1
2008-09	Mughan	Azerbaijan Premier League	13	0			-		13	0
2009-10	AZAL	Azerbaijan Premier League	6	0			-		6	0
2010-11	AZAL	Azerbaijan Premier League	24	3	3	0	-		26	3
2011-12	AZAL	Azerbaijan Premier League	7	0	1	0	1	0	9	0
2011-12	Ravan Baku	Azerbaijan Premier League	9	0	0	0	-		9	0
2012-13	Ravan Baku	Azerbaijan Premier League	5	1	1	0	-		6	1
2013-14	Ravan Baku	Azerbaijan Premier League	3	0	1	2	-		4	2
Total	Azerbaijan		152	17	6	7	1	0	159	24
Career total			152	17	6	7	1	0	159	24
