= Tomasz Stolpa =

Polish footballer

Personal information
- Full name: Tomasz Stolpa
- Date of birth: 18 March 1983 (age 43)
- Place of birth: Sosnowiec, Poland
- Height: 1.88 m (6 ft 2 in)
- Position: Striker

Senior career*
Years	Team	Apps	(Gls)
2001–2004	Zagłębie Sosnowiec	70	(25)
2004–2006	Tromsø	5	(0)
2005	→ Eendracht Aalst 2002 (loan)	4	(0)
2006	Enköping	14	(4)
2007	Gefle	6	(0)
2008	Grindavík	19	(4)
2009–2010	Gabala	31	(7)
2010	Zagłębie Sosnowiec	3	(0)
2011	Odra Wodzisław	9	(3)
2011–2013	Siarka Tarnobrzeg	9	(7)
Total		170	(50)
- * Club domestic league appearances and goals

Tomasz Stolpa (born 18 March 1983) is a Polish former professional footballer who played as a striker.

== Career ==
=== Zagłębie Sosnowiec ===
Tomasz Stolpa began his career playing from youth level as a striker for Zagłębie Sosnowiec, a football club in Sosnowiec, Poland, making his first appearance for them in June 2001. He was the top-scorer for this club with 25 goals over 70 appearances and helped them to win promotion twice.

=== Tromsø IL ===
Tomasz's appearances with Zagłębie Sosnowiec attracted the attention of the Norwegian Premier League club Tromsø IL and he was subsequently signed to play for them in Norway. After a short while on loan to the Belgian club V.C. Eendracht Aalst 2002, Tomasz returned to Tromsø, participated in the Royal League, a football tournament between top clubs in Norway, Sweden and Denmark, and played with Tromsø IL in the UEFA Cup.

=== Enköpings SK ===
In January 2006, he was signed to play for Enköpings SK in Sweden and helped them towards promotion to the second-highest football league in Sweden, the Superettan, by scoring 4 goals in 14 games.

=== Gefle IF ===
In December 2006, he signed a two-year contract with the club Gefle IF, who play in the top football league in Sweden, the Allsvenskan.

=== Grindavík ===
In 2008 Tomasz Stolpa left Gefle IF over selection concerns and joined the Icelandic club Grindavík. His performances attracted the attention of some Greek and Cypriot clubs, but the manager of Grindavík would not sanction his transfer. Tomasz scored 5 goals in 22 games in his first season for Grindavík, playing often, not in his normal position as striker but on the left wing, due to his ability with his left foot.

=== FK Qäbälä ===
In January 2009, after receiving a good offer, he signed a one-year contract with the club FK Qäbälä, who play in the Azerbaijan Premier League. During Gabala's 2-1 victory over Standard Sumgayit on 20 November 2009, Stolpa scored Gabala's 200th goal.

=== Zagłębie Sosnowiec ===
In September 2010, he joined Zagłębie Sosnowiec on a half year contract.

=== Odra Wodzisław ===
In February 2011, he moved to Odra Wodzisław.

== Career statistics ==
Club statistics
Season	Club	League	League		Cup		Europe		Total	
Season	Club	League	App	Goals	App	Goals	App	Goals	App	Goals
2000–01	Zagłębie Sosnowiec	II liga					-			
2001–02	Zagłębie Sosnowiec	I liga	2	0	1	0	-		3	0
2002–03	Zagłębie Sosnowiec	II liga			3	0	-		3	0
2003–04	Zagłębie Sosnowiec	II liga					-			
2004–05	Zagłębie Sosnowiec	I liga	1	0			-		1	0
2004	Tromsø	Tippeligaen	2	0			-		2	0
2004–05	Eendracht Aalst (loan)	Division II	4	0			-		4	0
2005	Tromsø	Tippeligaen	0	0			-		0	0
2006	Tromsø	Tippeligaen	3	0			-		3	0
2006	Enköping	Division 1	14	4			-		14	4
2007	Gefle	Allsvenskan	6	0			-		6	0
2008	Gefle	Allsvenskan	0	0			-		0	0
2008	Grindavík	Úrvalsdeild	19	4			-		19	4
2008–09	Gabala	Azerbaijan Premier League	4	0			-		4	0
2009–10	Gabala	Azerbaijan Premier League	27	7			-		27	7
2010–11	Zagłębie Sosnowiec	II liga	3	0			-		3	0
2010–11	Odra Wodzisław	I liga	9	3			-		9	3
2011–12	Siarka Tarnobrzeg	III liga	9	7			-		9	7
Total	Poland		21	10			-		21	10
Total	Sweden		20	4			-		20	4
Total	Iceland		19	4			-		19	4
Total	Azerbaijan		31	7			-		31	7
Total			91	25	0	0	0	0	91	25
