= Qabala İK =

Association football club in Azerbaijan

Qəbələ
- Full name: Qəbələ İdman Klubu
- Nicknames: Radarlar (The Radars); Qırmızı-qaralar (The Red-blacks)
- Founded: 4 May 2005; 21 years ago, as Qabala
- Ground: Gabala City Stadium
- Capacity: 3,748
- Chairman: Fariz Najafov
- Manager: Jeton Beqiri
- League: Azerbaijan Premier League
- 2025–26: 11th of 12
- Website: www.gabalafc.az
Home colours	Away colours

Qəbələ İdman Klubu (pronounced [ɡæbæˈlæ]), is an Azerbaijani professional football club based in Qabala, which has competed in the Azerbaijan Premier League since 2006. They will be set to play in the Azerbaijan Premier League from the 2025–26 season following their promotion from the Azerbaijan First Division in 2024–25. Gabala has been the runner up in the Premier League three times and has won the national cup twice, in 2019 and 2023. Gabala is one of the 2 teams that started the first qualifying round of the UEFA Europa League for 2 seasons and managed to move on to the group stage.

== History ==
The club was founded under the name of Goy Gol on 3 July 1995, based in Goy Gol. On 1 September 2005, Goy Gol was registered in Gabala by the Ministry of Justice, before the AFFA registered the team as professional on 5 September of the same year. In the summer of 2006, the team moved from Goygol to Qabala, before the club changed its name to Gilan PFK. Later, the club changed its name to Qəbələ PFK on 31 August 2007.

On 10 May 2010, former Arsenal defender Tony Adams was appointed as new manager after signing a £1 million per year deal with the club. In his first season in charge, Gabala finished in 7th place in Azerbaijan Premier League. In November 2011, Adams resigned as Gabala's coach due to family problems.

Despite the appointment of managers like Fatih Kavlak and Ramiz Mammadov, the club could not reach a satisfactory position in the league and was struggling in the middle of the table for many years. On 29 May 2013, Yuri Semin was appointed as the new manager after signing a £1 million per year deal with the club. In the same year, the club qualified for European cups for the first time in their history but lost to Neftchi Baku on penalties in the final of the Azerbaijan Cup.

In the 2015–16 season of the Europa League, they became the 3rd club from Azerbaijan to qualify for the group stage after Qarabağ FK and Neftçi Baku. They eliminated Dinamo Tbilisi, Čukarički, Apollon Limassol and surprisingly Panathinaikos. They came 4th in their tough group of Borussia Dortmund, PAOK, and FC Krasnodar. They got two points, both from 0–0 draws against PAOK.

Following their defeat to Keşla in the 2017–18 Azerbaijan Cup Final, Roman Hryhorchuk left Gabala after his contract was not extended. On 30 May 2018, Gabala announced that Sanan Gurbanov had been appointed as the club's new manager on a two-year contract. On 31 August 2019, Gurbanov resigned as manager following Gabala's 4–0 defeat at home to Keşla. On 2 September 2019, Elmar Bakhshiyev was appointed as Gabala's manager.

On 24 February 2024, Elmar Bakhshiyev resigned as head coach, with Kakhaber Tskhadadze being appointed the following day. On 27 May 2024, at the end of the 2023-24 season, Gabala extended their contract with Tskhadadze for an additional three-seasons.

Following their 5–0 victory over Baku Sporting on 4 April, Gabala secured promotion back to the Azerbaijan Premier League at their first attempt. On 31 August 2026, Kakhaber Tskhadadze left his role as head coach after his contract was terminated by mutual agreement. On 16 September 2026, Gabala announced the appointment of Jeton Beqiri as their new head coach, to a one-year contract with the option of an additional two season.

=== League and cup history ===
Season	League									Azerbaijan Cup	Top goalscorer		Managers
Season	Div.	Pos.	Pl.	W	D	L	GS	GA	P	Azerbaijan Cup	Name	League	Managers
2005–06	2nd	1st	30	22	6	2	72	14	72	Last 16	(Azerbaijan) R.Ahmadov	18	(Azerbaijan) Faig Jabbarov
2006–07	1st	11th	24	4	4	16	17	47	16	Last 16	(Azerbaijan) Vusal Garaev	4	(Azerbaijan) Ramiz Mammadov
2007–08	1st	6th	26	11	3	12	33	36	36	Semi-finals	(Russia) Vitali Balamestny	8	(Azerbaijan) Ramiz Mammadov
2008–09	1st	10th	26	9	6	11	28	21	33	Semi-finals	(Azerbaijan) Kanan Karimov	6	(Azerbaijan) Ramiz Mammadov
2009–10	1st	6th	42	15	14	14	42	48	56	1st round	(Poland) Tomasz Stolpa	7	(Azerbaijan) Ramiz Mammadov
2010–11	1st	7th	32	13	12	7	31	18	51	Quarter-finals	(Jamaica) Deon Burton	9	(England) Tony Adams
2011–12	1st	5th	32	15	7	10	43	32	52	Quarter-finals	(Brazil) Dodô (France) Yannick Kamanan	9	(England) Tony Adams (Turkey) Fatih Kavlak
2012–13	1st	6th	32	10	8	14	32	40	38	Quarter-finals	(Senegal) Victor Mendy (Brazil) Assis	6	(Turkey) Fatih Kavlak (Azerbaijan) Ramiz Mammadov (Spain) Luis Aragón
2013–14	1st	3rd	36	18	7	11	48	36	61	Runners-up	(Switzerland) Danijel Subotić	12	(Russia) Yuri Semin
2014–15	1st	3rd	32	15	9	8	46	35	54	Quarter-finals	(Azerbaijan) Javid Huseynov	11	(Romania) Dorinel Munteanu (Ukraine) Roman Hryhorchuk
2015–16	1st	3rd	36	16	11	9	44	28	59	Semi-finals	(Ukraine) Oleksiy Gai	10	(Ukraine) Roman Hryhorchuk
2016–17	1st	2nd	28	14	10	4	48	21	52	Runners-up	(Croatia) Filip Ozobić	11	(Ukraine) Roman Hryhorchuk
2017–18	1st	2nd	28	14	7	7	43	26	49	Runners-up	(France) Bagaliy Dabo	13	(Ukraine) Roman Hryhorchuk
2018–19	1st	4th	28	9	9	10	31	33	36	Champions	(Nigeria) James Adeniyi	10	(Azerbaijan) Sanan Gurbanov
2019–20	1st	8th	20	5	4	11	25	35	19	Semi-finals	(Georgia (country)) Davit Volkovi	5	(Azerbaijan) Sanan Gurbanov (Azerbaijan) Elmar Bakhshiyev
2020–21	1st	7th	28	5	11	12	23	44	26	Quarter-finals	(Brazil) Raphael Utzig	5	(Azerbaijan) Elmar Bakhshiyev
2021–22	1st	4th	28	12	9	7	38	34	45	Semi-finals	(Albania) Isnik Alimi	8	(Azerbaijan) Elmar Bakhshiyev
2022–23	1st	4th	36	13	11	12	47	47	50	Champions	(Albania) Isnik Alimi	9	(Azerbaijan) Elmar Bakhshiyev
2023–24	1st	10th	36	7	5	24	30	64	26	Semi-finals	(Israel) Osama Khalaila	9	(Azerbaijan) Elmar Bakhshiyev (Georgia (country)) Kakhaber Tskhadadze
2024–25	2nd	1st	27	21	4	2	56	8	67	Last 16	(Republic of the Congo) Domi Massoumou	16	(Georgia (country)) Kakhaber Tskhadadze
2025–26	1st	11th	33	7	6	20	32	49	27	Quarter-final	(Republic of the Congo) Domi Massoumou	9	(Georgia (country)) Kakhaber Tskhadadze

=== European record ===
As of match played 3 August 2023

Competition	Pld	W	D	L	GF	GA
UEFA Europa League	38	10	7	21	36	55
UEFA Europa Conference League	4	1	0	3	6	12
Total	42	11	7	24	42	67

Season	Competition	Round	Club	Home	Away	Aggregate
2014–15	UEFA Europa League	1Q	(Bosnia and Herzegovina) Široki Brijeg	0–2	0–3	0–5
2015–16	UEFA Europa League	1Q	(Georgia (country)) Dinamo Tbilisi	2–0	1–2	3–2
2015–16	UEFA Europa League	2Q	(Serbia) Čukarički	2–0	0–1	2–1
2015–16	UEFA Europa League	3Q	(Cyprus) Apollon Limassol	1–0	1–1	2–1
2015–16	UEFA Europa League	PO	(Greece) Panathinaikos	0–0	2–2	2–2 (a)
2015–16	UEFA Europa League	Group C	(Germany) Borussia Dortmund	1–3	0–4	4th
2015–16	UEFA Europa League	Group C	(Greece) PAOK	0–0	0–0	4th
2015–16	UEFA Europa League	Group C	(Russia) Krasnodar	0–3	1–2	4th
2016–17	UEFA Europa League	1Q	(Georgia (country)) Samtredia	5–1	1–2	6–3
2016–17	UEFA Europa League	2Q	(Hungary) MTK Budapest	2–0	2–1	4–1
2016–17	UEFA Europa League	3Q	(France) Lille	1–0	1–1	2–1
2016–17	UEFA Europa League	PO	(Slovenia) Maribor	3–1	0–1	3–2
2016–17	UEFA Europa League	Group C	(Belgium) Anderlecht	1–3	1–3	4th
2016–17	UEFA Europa League	Group C	(France) Saint-Étienne	1–2	0–1	4th
2016–17	UEFA Europa League	Group C	(Germany) Mainz 05	2–3	0–2	4th
2017–18	UEFA Europa League	2Q	(Poland) Jagiellonia Białystok	1–1	2–0	3–1
2017–18	UEFA Europa League	3Q	(Greece) Panathinaikos	1–2	0–1	1–3
2018–19	UEFA Europa League	1Q	(Luxembourg) Progrès Niederkorn	0–2	1–0	1–2
2019–20	UEFA Europa League	2Q	(Georgia (country)) Dinamo Tbilisi	0–2	0–3	0–5
2022–23	UEFA Europa Conference League	2Q	(Hungary) Fehérvár	2–1	1–4	3–5
2023–24	UEFA Europa Conference League	2Q	(Cyprus) Omonia	2–3	1–4	3–7

Notes

- 1Q: First qualifying round
- 2Q: Second qualifying round
- 3Q: Third qualifying round
- PO: Play-off round
- Group: Group stage

== Crest and colours ==
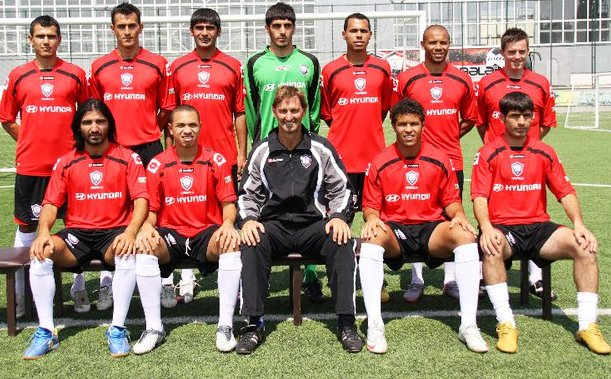
Team photo for the 2010–2011 season.

The club's crest includes Caucasus Mountains with a black crescent and red eight-pointed star, similar to Azerbaijani flag. It also includes 2005 which signifies the club's formation year.

=== Shirt sponsors and kit manufacturers ===
Gabala's traditional kit is composed of red shirts, black shorts and red socks. The club's first kit manufacturer was Erreà, until a two-year deal was agreed with Joma in 2013.

In August 2012, Gabala signed a one-year deal with the American multinational beverage corporation and manufacturer Pepsi, which will replace Hyundai as the shirt sponsor from the 2013–14 season.

In September 2015, Gabala signed a one-year deal with QafqaZ Hotels and Resorts.

On 31 January 2020, Gabala announced that dairy brand Milla would be the club's new title sponsor until the end of 2021.

On 4 July 2023, Gabala announced Capelli Sport as their new kit supplier on a three-year contract.

On 12 August 2025, Gabala announced that they had signed a one-year agreement with AFB Bank for them to be the clubs front of shirt sponsor.

Years	Manufacturer	Sponsor
2009–2010	(Germany) Adidas	(South Korea) Hyundai
2010–2011	(Italy) Lotto	(South Korea) Hyundai
2011–2012	(Italy) Erreà	(South Korea) Hyundai
2012–2013	(Italy) Erreà	(United States) Pepsi
2013–2015	(Spain) Joma	(United States) Pepsi
2015–2020	(Spain) Joma	(Azerbaijan) QafqaZ Hotels
2020–2021	(Spain) Joma	(Azerbaijan) Milla
2021–2022	(Spain) Joma	(Azerbaijan) Jale
2022–2023	(Spain) Joma	(Azerbaijan) Gilan & Knauf
2023–2025	(United States) Capelli Sport	(Azerbaijan) Gilan & Knauf
2025–present	(Spain) Joma	(Azerbaijan) AFB Bank

== Stadium ==
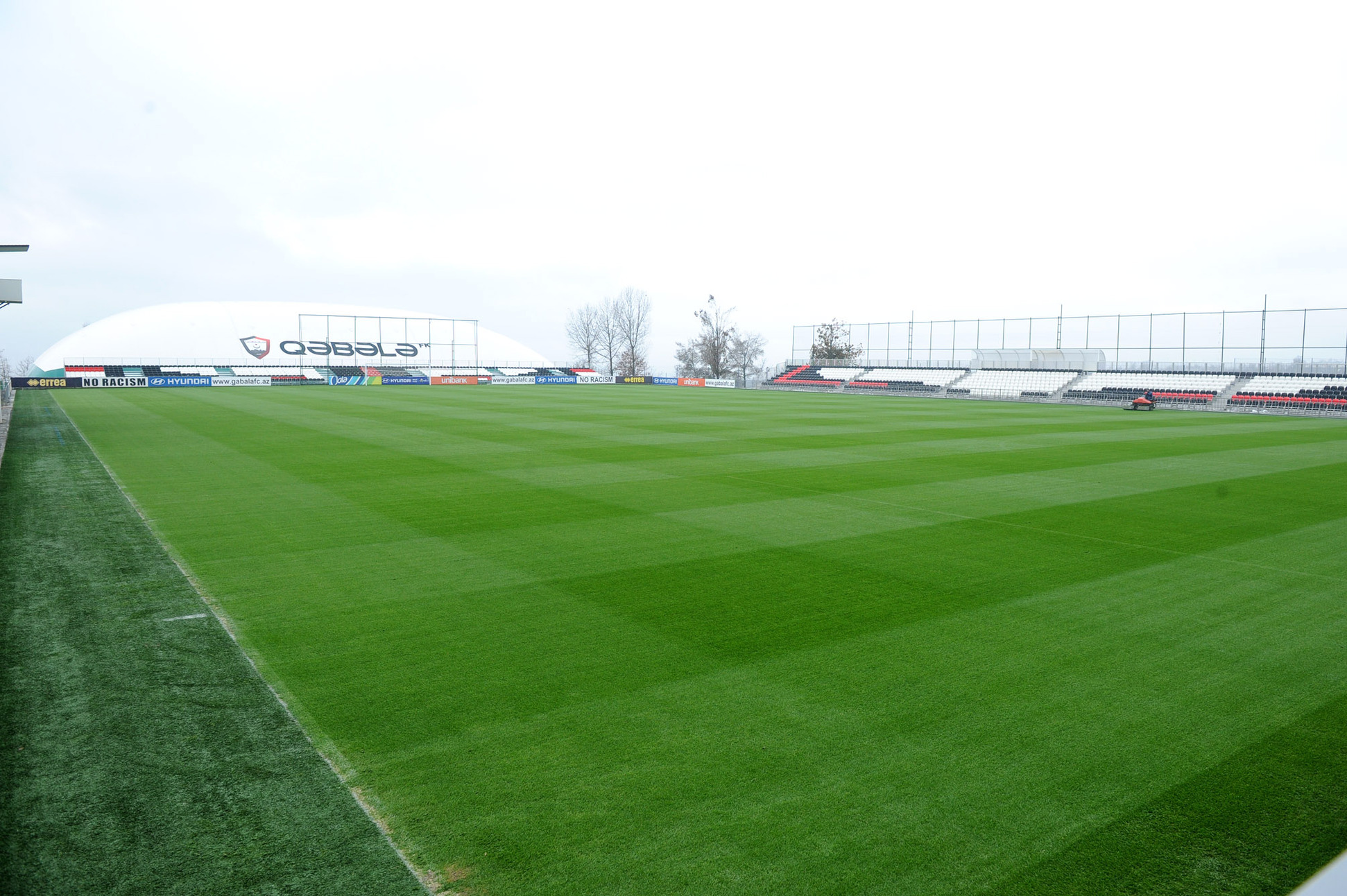
Gabala City Stadium in 2011.

The club play their home matches at the Gabala City Stadium, an all-seater football stadium situated in Qabala.

As of 2007, predominantly due to UEFA requirements, the club proposed an extensive renovation of the stadium, which has since been in constant process of redevelopment. AFL Architects were appointed to design a new 15,000 capacity stadium and training facility in December 2008 after winning a limited design competition. Accommodation within the stadium will include hotel and conferencing facilities, as well as retail and corporate hospitality space, and a dramatic viewing deck at the top of the entrance tower. It is expected that the stadium was scheduled to open in 2014.

== Supporters ==
Gabala has a large fanbase in relation to its comparative lack of success on the pitch. Gabala's fan base has fluctuated over the years with high crowds coinciding with the club's success in the Premier League so that the club now averages in the top four best home attendances in the country. One of the main supporters group name is Red Black Army.

== Honours ==
- Azerbaijan League
  - Runners-up (2): 2016–17, 2017–18
- Azerbaijan Cup
  - Winners (2): 2018–19, 2022–23
  - Runners-up (3): 2013–14, 2016–17, 2017–18
- Azerbaijan First Division
  - Winners (2): 2005–06, 2024–25

== Players ==
Azerbaijani teams are limited to nine players without Azerbaijani citizenship. The squad list includes only the principal nationality of each player, several non-European players on the squad have dual citizenship with an EU country.

=== Current squad ===
As of 3 October 2026

Note: Flags indicate national team as defined under FIFA eligibility rules; some limited exceptions apply. Players may hold more than one non-FIFA nationality.

No.	Pos.	Nation	Player
1	GK	AZE	Səlahət Ağayev
2	DF	AZE	Aqşin Yaqubov
3	DF	BRA	Edson Eduardo
4	MF	AZE	Elvin Camalov
5	DF	COD	Nathan Monzango
6	MF	ESP	Jaime Sierra
7	FW	POR	Bruno Silva
8	MF	ALB	Endri Çekiçi
9	FW	SUI	Karim Rossi
10	MF	AZE	Shahin Shahniyarov
11	MF	AZE	Asif Mammadov
12	DF	CIV	Kouya Mabea
13	DF	AZE	Nicat Aliyev
16	DF	GHA	Isaac Amoah

No.	Pos.	Nation	Player
17	MF	AZE	Qadir Ramazanov
21	FW	AZE	Ziya Shakarkhanov
22	MF	AZE	Farid Isgandarov
23	FW	BRA	Raphael Utzig
24	FW	NGR	Ismahil Akinade
26	DF	AZE	Elnur Mustafayev
27	MF	AZE	Eshqin Ahmadov
32	GK	BRA	Arthur Motta (on loan from Beroe)
44	DF	AZE	Salman Alasgarov
66	DF	AZE	Nuqay Rashidov
74	DF	AZE	Suleyman Damadayev
80	FW	NGR	Meshack Ubochioma
81	DF	AZE	Samir Ağayev
94	GK	AZE	Habib Hushanov

=== Out on loan ===
Note: Flags indicate national team as defined under FIFA eligibility rules; some limited exceptions apply. Players may hold more than one non-FIFA nationality.

No.	Pos.	Nation	Player
70	FW	ANG	Paulo Quimbila (at Gancabasar)

== Club officials ==
=== The Board of Directors ===
Position	Name
President	(Azerbaijan) Fariz Najafov
General manager	(Azerbaijan) Sabuhi Safiyarli
Team manager	(Azerbaijan) Mahammad Azizli
Press secretary	(Azerbaijan) Elnur Mammadli

=== Coaching staff ===
Position	Name
Head coach	(North Macedonia) Jeton Beqiri
Assistant coach	
Fitness coach	(Turkey) Chaglar Volga
Video analysis coach	(Azerbaijan) Arvid Bregasi
Goalkeeper coach	(Azerbaijan) Amil Agajanov
Under-19 head coach	(Azerbaijan) Famil Khalilov

=== Medical staff ===
Position	Name
Doctor	(Azerbaijan) Ilkin Islamov
Assistant doctor	(Azerbaijan) Movsum Huseynov
Assistant doctor	(Azerbaijan) Taleh Khalilov

== Managers ==
Information correct as of match played 7 November 2026. Only competitive matches are counted.

Name	Nat.	From	To	P	W	D	L	GS	GA	%W	Honours	Notes
Faig Jabbarov	Azerbaijan	2005	2006	30	22	6	2	0	0	73.33	Azerbaijan First Division (1)	
Ramiz Mammadov	Azerbaijan	2006	May 2010	118	38	27	53	0	0	32.20		
Tony Adams	England	12 May 2010	16 November 2011	44	17	15	12	45	35	38.64		
Fatih Kavlak	Turkey	18 November 2011	27 September 2012	29	14	7	8	43	27	48.28		
Ramiz Mammadov	Azerbaijan	24 September 2012	2 April 2013	21	8	6	7	23	22	38.10		
Luis Aragon (Interim)	Spain	2 April 2013	28 May 2013	8	1	3	4	5	10	12.50		
Yuri Semin	Russia	28 May 2013	23 May 2014	41	21	9	11	56	38	51.22		
Dorinel Munteanu	Romania	16 June 2014	8 December 2014	18	6	5	7	20	26	33.33		
Sanan Gurbanov (Interim)	Azerbaijan	8 December 2014	21 December 2014	3	1	2	0	4	3	33.33		
Roman Hryhorchuk	Ukraine	21 December 2014	29 May 2018	159	75	41	43	238	150	47.17		
Sanan Gurbanov	Azerbaijan	30 May 2018	31 August 2019	40	14	9	17	37	52	35.00	Azerbaijan Cup (1)	
Elmar Bakhshiyev	Azerbaijan	2 September 2019	24 February 2024	155	52	41	62	187	228	33.55	Azerbaijan Cup (1)	
Kakhaber Tskhadadze	Georgia	25 February 2024	31 August 2026	85	35	15	35	119	93	41.18	Azerbaijan First Division (1)	
Amil Agajanov (Interim)	Azerbaijan	31 August 2026	20 September 2026	3	1	0	2	2	5	33.33		
Jeton Beqiri	North Macedonia	20 September 2026		6	2	1	3	7	11	33.33		

- Notes:

P – Total of played matches W – Won matches D – Drawn matches L – Lost matches GS – Goal scored GA – Goals against
%W – Percentage of matches won

Nationality is indicated by the corresponding FIFA country code(s).

== Individual records ==
Urfan Abbasov is Gabala's most capped player, with 305 appearances for the club. Players in bold signifies current Gabala player.

=== Most appearances ===
As of match played 7 November 2026

	Name	Years	League apps	League goals	Playoff apps	Playoff goals	Cup apps	Cup goals	Europe apps	Europe goals	Total apps	Total goals
1	(Azerbaijan) Ürfan Abbasov	2011–2019, 2021–2024	248	5	0	0	40	1	17	0	305	6
2	(Azerbaijan) **Asif Mammadov**	2006-2007, 2015–Present	209	13	0	0	31	3	24	1	264	17
3	(Azerbaijan) Murad Musayev	2013–2016, 2019–2026	167	7	1	0	23	0	3	0	194	7
4	(Ukraine) Dmytro Bezotosnyi	2015–2019	117	0	0	0	17	0	32	0	166	0
5	(Brazil) Dodô	2011–2016	131	23	0	0	15	3	15	4	161	30
6	(Azerbaijan) **Elvin Camalov**	2013–2019, 2026–Present	117	0	1	0	18	0	12	0	148	0
7	(Serbia) Vojislav Stanković	2015–2016, 2016–2019	92	1	0	0	21	1	29	1	142	3
8	(Azerbaijan) Javid Huseynov	2014–2015, 2016–2019, 2020-2021	109	16	0	0	20	2	11	3	140	21
8	(Azerbaijan) Ulvi Isgandarov	2017–2024	118	17	0	0	16	4	6	0	140	21
10	(Senegal) Victor Mendy	2011–2015	112	29	0	0	13	4	2	0	127	33

=== Top goalscorers ===
As of match played 7 November 2026

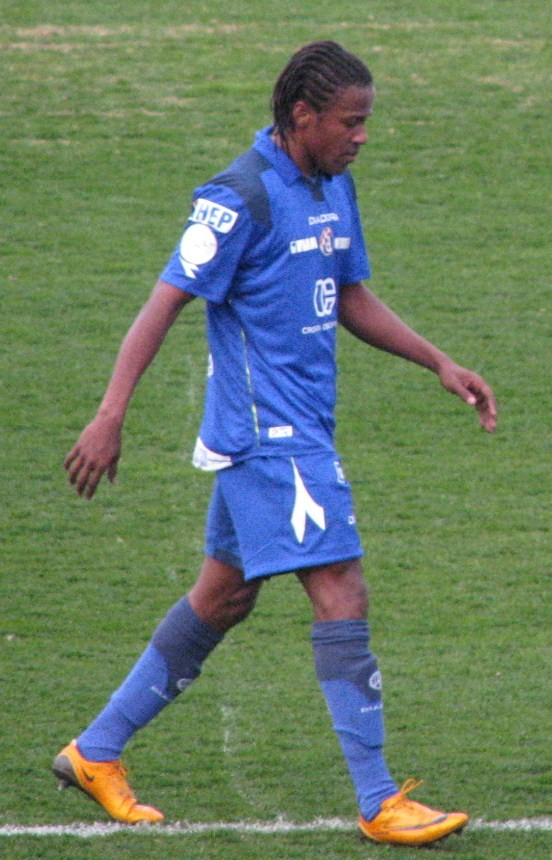
Dodô scored 30 goals in 161 games during his 5-years with Gabala

	Name	Years	League apps	League goals	Playoff apps	Playoff goals	Cup apps	Cup goals	Europe apps	Europe goals	Total apps	Total goals	Ratio
1	(Senegal) Victor Mendy	2011–2015	112	29	0	0	13	4	2	0	127	33	0.26
2	(Brazil) Dodô	2011–2016	131	23	0	0	15	3	15	4	161	30	0.19
3	(Republic of the Congo) Domi Massoumou	2024–2026	60	25	1	0	6	3	0	0	67	28	0.42
4	(France) Bagaliy Dabo	2016–2018	43	20	0	0	6	4	13	3	62	27	0.44
5	(Croatia) Filip Ozobić	2016–2018	45	16	0	0	10	6	18	3	73	25	0.34
6	(Albania) Isnik Alimi	2021–2023	61	17	0	0	10	5	2	0	73	22	0.3
7	(Azerbaijan) Javid Huseynov	2014–2015, 2016–2019, 2020-2021	109	16	0	0	20	2	11	3	140	21	0.15
7	(Azerbaijan) Ulvi Isgandarov	2017–2024	118	17	0	0	16	4	6	0	140	21	0.15
9	(France) Steeven Joseph-Monrose	2017–2019	47	15	0	0	9	3	6	2	62	20	0.32
10	(Switzerland) Danijel Subotić	2013–2014, 2017	40	15	0	0	8	4	0	0	48	19	0.4

== Presidential history ==
Name	Years
Tale Heydarov	2005–2019
Fariz Najafov	2019–

== See also ==
- Gabala Cup 2012
