= 2014–15 FK Qarabağ season =

Qarabağ
2014–15 season
- Chairman: Tahir Gözal
- Manager: Gurban Gurbanov
- Stadium: Tofiq Bahramov Stadium^{1}
- Premier League: 1st
- Azerbaijan Cup: Winners
- Champions League: 3rd qualifying round vs Red Bull Salzburg
- Europa League: Group Stage
- Top goalscorer: League: Two Players (10); All: Reynaldo (16)
| Home colours | Away colours |

The Qarabağ 2014–15 season was Qarabağ's 22nd Azerbaijan Premier League season and their seventh season under manager Gurban Gurbanov. They completed a domestic double by defending their Premier League title and winning the Azerbaijan Cup. In Europe, Qarabağ were knocked out of the UEFA Champions League in the 3rd qualifying round by Red Bull Salzburg, resulting in them going into the Play-off round for the UEFA Europa League. In the Europa League, Qarabağ reached the group stages for the first time, where they finished third, behind Internazionale and Dnipro Dnipropetrovsk, and ahead of Saint-Étienne.

== Squad ==
As of 21 December 2014

Note: Flags indicate national team as defined under FIFA eligibility rules; some limited exceptions apply. Players may hold more than one non-FIFA nationality.

| No. | Pos. | Nation | Player |
|---|---|---|---|
| 1 | GK | AZE | Farhad Valiyev |
| 2 | DF | AZE | Gara Garayev |
| 3 | DF | AZE | Tarlan Guliyev |
| 4 | DF | AZE | Bilal Abbaszade |
| 5 | DF | AZE | Maksim Medvedev |
| 6 | DF | AZE | Haji Ahmadov |
| 7 | MF | AZE | Namiq Yusifov |
| 9 | MF | BRA | Reynaldo |
| 10 | MF | MKD | Muarem Muarem |
| 11 | FW | BRA | Danilo Dias |
| 13 | GK | BIH | Ibrahim Šehić |
| 14 | DF | AZE | Rashad Sadygov (captain) |
| 15 | MF | AZE | Toghrul Bilalli |
| 17 | FW | AZE | Vüqar Nadirov |
| 18 | MF | AZE | Ilgar Gurbanov |

| No. | Pos. | Nation | Player |
|---|---|---|---|
| 20 | MF | BRA | Richard |
| 21 | FW | AZE | Tural Rzayev |
| 22 | MF | AZE | Toğrul Bilallı |
| 23 | FW | AZE | Tural Isgandarov |
| 24 | DF | ALB | Admir Teli |
| 25 | DF | ALB | Ansi Agolli |
| 27 | DF | AZE | Elvin Musazade |
| 33 | DF | AZE | Shahriyar Aliyev |
| 41 | FW | NED | Leroy George |
| 55 | DF | AZE | Badavi Guseynov |
| 70 | MF | BRA | Chumbinho |
| 77 | MF | AZE | Javid Tagiyev |
| 99 | FW | AZE | Namig Alasgarov |
| -- | MF | ESP | Dani Quintana |

=== Out on loan ===
Note: Flags indicate national team as defined under FIFA eligibility rules; some limited exceptions apply. Players may hold more than one non-FIFA nationality.

| No. / Pos. / Nation / Player; 33 / MF / AZE / Tamkin Khalilzade (at AZAL) | No. / Pos. / Nation / Player; 44 / DF / AZE / Eltun Yagublu (at AZAL) |

== Transfers ==
=== Summer ===
In: Note: Flags indicate national team as defined under FIFA eligibility rules; some limited exceptions apply. Players may hold more than one non-FIFA nationality.

| No. | Pos. | Nation | Player |
|---|---|---|---|
| 3 | DF | AZE | Tarlan Guliyev (from (Azerbaijan) Neftchi Baku) |
| 8 | FW | SUI | Innocent Emeghara |
| 11 | FW | BRA | Danilo Dias (from (Portugal) Marítimo) |
| 33 | DF | AZE | Shahriyar Aliyev (from (Azerbaijan) Baku) |
| 77 | MF | AZE | Javid Tagiyev (from (Azerbaijan) AZAL) |
| 99 | FW | AZE | Namig Alasgarov (from (Azerbaijan) Baku) |

Out: Note: Flags indicate national team as defined under FIFA eligibility rules; some limited exceptions apply. Players may hold more than one non-FIFA nationality.

| No. | Pos. | Nation | Player |
|---|---|---|---|
| 11 | FW | CGO | Ulrich Kapolongo (to (Czech Republic) Teplice) |
| 19 | FW | GEO | Jaba Dvali (loan return to (Georgia (country)) Dinamo Tbilisi) |
| 33 | MF | AZE | Tamkin Khalilzade (loan to (Azerbaijan) AZAL) |
| 44 | DF | AZE | Eltun Yagublu (loan to (Azerbaijan) AZAL) |
| 99 | FW | GEO | Nikoloz Gelashvili (to (Georgia (country)) Zestafoni) |

=== Winter ===
In: Note: Flags indicate national team as defined under FIFA eligibility rules; some limited exceptions apply. Players may hold more than one non-FIFA nationality.

| No. | Pos. | Nation | Player |
|---|---|---|---|
| -- | MF | ESP | Dani Quintana (from (Saudi Arabia) Al-Ahli) |

Out: Note: Flags indicate national team as defined under FIFA eligibility rules; some limited exceptions apply. Players may hold more than one non-FIFA nationality.

| No. | Pos. | Nation | Player |
|---|---|---|---|
| 8 | FW | SUI | Innocent Emeghara (to (United States) San Jose Earthquakes) |

== Friendlies ==
| 23 June 2014 | Shakhtar Donetsk (Ukraine) | 2 – 0 | (Azerbaijan) Qarabağ | Going am Wilden Kaiser, Austria |
| 21:00 AZST (UTC+5) | Ferreyra 59', 68' | Report; Summary | | Stadium: Stadium SC Going; Attendance: 100; Referee: Nenad Kostachevich (Austria) |

| 28 June 2014 | Krasnodar (Russia) | 1 – 0 | (Azerbaijan) Qarabağ | Hochfilzen, Austria |
| 20:00 AZST (UTC+5) | Ahmedov 47' | Summary | | Attendance: 100; Referee: Hofer |

| 1 July 2014 | Wacker Burghausen (Germany) | 0 – 2 | (Azerbaijan) Qarabağ | Kössen, Austria |
| 20:00 AZST (UTC+5) | | Summary | Nadirov 4'; Tagiyev 56' |

| 4 July 2014 | Viktoria Plzeň (Czech Republic) | 1 – 3 | (Azerbaijan) Qarabağ | Austria |
| AZST (UTC+5) | Kolář 70' | Summary | Reynaldo 4'; George 27'; Muarem 71' |

| 17 January 2015 | RNK Split (Croatia) | 3 – 1 | (Azerbaijan) Qarabağ | Antalya, Turkey |
| AZT (UTC+4) | Goal | Report | Alasgarov 70' |

| 21 January 2014 | Zürich (Switzerland) | 1 – 1 | (Azerbaijan) Qarabağ | Antalya, Turkey |
| AZT (UTC+4) | Schönbächler 28' | FC Zürich; Azerifootball | Reynaldo 78' (pen.) | Stadium: Santai Football Center |

| 24 January 2014 | Levski Sofia (Bulgaria) | 3 – 0 | (Azerbaijan) Qarabağ | Antalya, Turkey |
| AZT (UTC+4) | Goal | Report | Penalty missed |

| 27 January 2014 | Legia Warsaw (Poland) | 0 – 2 | (Azerbaijan) Qarabağ | Antalya, Turkey |
| AZT (UTC+4) | | Report | Reynaldo 67'; Tagiyev 82' |

| 29 January 2014 | Mordovia Saransk (Russia) | 0 – 0 | (Azerbaijan) Qarabağ | Antalya, Turkey |
| 13:00 AZT (UTC+4) | | Report |

| 31 January 2014 | Târgu Mureș (Romania) | 0 – 0 | (Azerbaijan) Qarabağ | Antalya, Turkey |
| AZT (UTC+4) | | Report |

== Competitions ==
=== Azerbaijan Supercup ===
| 13 August 2014 | Neftchi Baku | Postponed | Qarabağ | Qabala |
| AZST (UTC+5) | | [ Summary] | | Stadium: Gabala City Stadium |

=== Azerbaijan Premier League ===
==== Results summary ====
| Overall | | | | | | | | Home | | | | | | Away | | | | | |
| Pld | W | D | L | GF | GA | GD | Pts | W | D | L | GF | GA | GD | W | D | L | GF | GA | GD |
|---|---|---|---|---|---|---|---|---|---|---|---|---|---|---|---|---|---|---|---|
| 32 | 20 | 8 | 4 | 48 | 26 | +22 | 68 | 11 | 4 | 1 | 24 | 9 | +15 | 9 | 4 | 3 | 24 | 17 | +7 |

Last updated: 22 May 2015.
Source: Soccerway

==== Results ====
| 10 August 2014 1 | Sumgayit | 3 – 0 Awarded | Qarabağ | Sumqayit |
| 20:00 AZST (UTC+5) | T.Novruzov (yellow card) 77'; B.Hasanalizade (yellow card) 90+1' | Summary | Reynaldo 34', 85'; B.Hasanalizade 81' (o.g.) | Stadium: Kapital Bank Arena; Attendance: 1,380; Referee: Rauf Jabbarov |

| 16 August 2014 2 | Qarabağ | 0 – 0 | Inter Baku | Baku |
| 21:00 AZST (UTC+5) | George (yellow card) 37'; Yusifov (yellow card) 54' | Summary | D.Meza (yellow card) 86'; Madrigal (yellow card) 90+4' | Stadium: Tofiq Bahramov Stadium^{1} Attendance: 1,500; Referee: Fariz Yusifov |

| 22 August 2014 3 | Araz-Naxçıvan | Postponed | Qarabağ | Nakhchivan |
| 18:00 AZST (UTC+5) | | Summary | | Stadium: Nakhchivan City Stadium |

| 31 August 2014 4 | Qarabağ | 2 – 2 | Baku | Baku |
| 20:30 AZST (UTC+5) | Chumbinho 32' (pen.); Teli (yellow card) 44'; Šehić (yellow card) 71'; Nadirov (yellow card) 73'; Muarem 84'; Reynaldo (yellow card) 89' | Summary | M.Rahimov (yellow card) 31'; N.Novruzov 66'; Travner 70'; Horvat (yellow card) 83'; Mammadov (yellow card) 90+2' | Stadium: Tofiq Bahramov Stadium^{1} Attendance: 1,000; Referee: Ramil Diniyev |

| 13 September 2014 5 | AZAL | 0 – 3 | Qarabağ | Baku |
| 21:00 AZST (UTC+5) | Córdoba (yellow card) 16'; E.Yagublu (yellow card) 39'; A.Gasimov (yellow card) 68' | Summary | Chumbinho 20'; George 42'; Reynaldo 66' (yellow card) 81' | Stadium: AZAL Arena; Attendance: 500; Referee: Orkhan Mämmädov |

| 21 September 2014 6 | Qarabağ | 1 – 0 | Simurq | Baku |
| 20:00 AZST (UTC+5) | Nadirov 64' | Summary | Lambot (yellow card) 71'; V.Abdullayev (yellow card) 89' | Stadium: Tofiq Bahramov Stadium^{1} Attendance: 200; Referee: Aliyar Ağayev |

| 27 September 2014 7 | Neftchi Baku | 1 – 3 | Qarabağ | Baku |
| 16:00 AZST (UTC+5) | Nfor (yellow card) 24' (goal) 87'; Allahverdiyev (yellow card) 32'; Cardoso (yellow card) 34'; Ramos (yellow card) 37' | Summary | Reynaldo (yellow card) 14'; Richard 35' (pen.); Muarem 76'; Nadirov 85' | Stadium: Bakcell Arena; Attendance: 2,000; Referee: Orkhan Mämmädov |

| 17 October 2014 8 | Qarabağ | 2 – 0 | Gabala | Baku |
| 19:30 AZST (UTC+5) | Sadygov (yellow card) 17'; Teli (yellow card) 36'; Nadirov 45+2' (yellow card) 87'; Richard (yellow card) 54'; Reynaldo 89' (pen.) | Summary | E.Jamalov (yellow card) 30'; Benga (yellow card) 52'; Marquinhos (yellow card) 82'; M.Teymurov (yellow card) 88'; Ropotan (yellow card) 90+3' | Stadium: Tofiq Bahramov Stadium^{1} Attendance: 1,000; Referee: Rahim Häsänov |

| 26 October 2014 9 | Qarabağ | 3 – 2 | Khazar Lankaran | Baku |
| 18:00 AZT (UTC+4) | Emeghara 19' (pen.), 29'; Tagiyev 33'; N.Alasgarov (yellow card) 42'; Guliyev (yellow card) 90+2' | Summary | Thiego (yellow card) 18'; S.Tounkara (yellow card) 43'; Ivanov (yellow card) 54'; Aliyev (yellow card) 56' | Stadium: Tofiq Bahramov Stadium^{1} Attendance: 1,200; Referee: Ramil Diniyev |

| 29 October 2014 10 | Inter Baku | 0 – 0 | Qarabağ | Baku |
| 18:00 AZT (UTC+4) | D.Meza (yellow card) 35' | Summary | | Stadium: Inter Arena; Attendance: 2,000; Referee: Aliyar Ağayev |

| 2 November 2014 11 | Qarabağ | Annulled^{3} | Araz-Naxçıvan | Baku |
| 19:30 AZT (UTC+4) | Muarem 15'; Emeghara 34'; Reynaldo 50', 62' (pen.); S.Aliyev (yellow card) 52'; Gurbanov (yellow card) 59' | Summary | A.Dashzarini (yellow card) 32'; J.Hasanov (yellow card) 89' | Stadium: Tofiq Bahramov Stadium^{1} Attendance: 250; Referee: Vusal Äliyev |

| 20 November 2014 12 | Baku | 2 – 4 | Qarabağ | Baku |
| 14:00 AZT (UTC+4) | N.Gurbanov 10' (yellow card) 68'; Pelagias (yellow card) 21'; N.Novruzov (yellow card) 29'; Horvat (yellow card) 33'; Ristović 35' (yellow card) 71'; Jabá (yellow card) 71' | Summary | Emeghara 6', 15'; Garayev (yellow card) 50'; George (yellow card) 53' (goal) 78'; Reynaldo 70' | Stadium: Tofiq Bahramov Stadium; Attendance: 1,000; Referee: Orkhan Mämmädov |

| 23 November 2014 13 | Qarabağ | 2 – 1 | AZAL | Baku |
| 15:00 AZT (UTC+4) | Teli (yellow card) 24'; Gurbanov 30'; E.Yagublu 57' (o.g.) | Summary | Majidov (red card) 31'; Eduardo (yellow card) 53'; R.Abdullayev 61' (pen.) | Stadium: Tofiq Bahramov Stadium^{1} Attendance: 400; Referee: Ingilab Mämmädov |

| 30 November 2014 14 | Simurq | 2 – 3 | Qarabağ | Zaqatala |
| 17:00 AZT (UTC+4) | Ćeran 14'; T.Akhundov (yellow card) 64'; S.Zargarov (yellow card) 69'; Stanojević 80' | Summary | Gurbanov 23'; George 55', 74' | Stadium: Zaqatala City Stadium; Attendance: 3,000; Referee: Rahim Häsänov |

| 7 December 2014 15 | Qarabağ | 0 – 0 | Neftchi Baku | Baku |
| 15:15 AZT (UTC+4) | Richard (yellow card) 45+1'; Guseynov (yellow card) 64'; Emeghara (yellow card) 80' | Summary | A.Abdullayev (yellow card) 45+1' | Stadium: Tofiq Bahramov Stadium^{1} Attendance: 3,000; Referee: Aliyar Ağayev |

| 14 December 2014 16 | Gabala | 2 – 1 | Qarabağ | Qabala |
| 15:00 AZT (UTC+4) | U.Abbasov (yellow card) 45'; B.Soltanov 46'; Dodô 60' (yellow card) 90+2'; Aghayev (yellow card) 68' | Summary | N.Alasgarov 23'; Gurbanov (yellow card) 50'; Teli (yellow card) 80' | Stadium: Gabala City Stadium; Attendance: 500; Referee: Fariz Yusifov |

| 17 December 2014 17 | Khazar Lankaran | 2 – 3 | Qarabağ | Lankaran |
| 17:00 AZT (UTC+4) | Garayev 17' (o.g.); S.Tounkara 56' (yellow card) 71'; Thiego (yellow card) 58'; Ramaldanov (yellow card) 62'; Sadiqov (yellow card) 67' | Summary | Muarem 7', 63'; Richard (yellow card) 15'; Guseynov 80'; Garayev (yellow card) 85' | Stadium: Lankaran City Stadium; Attendance: 6,000; Referee: Orkhan Mämmädov |

| 21 December 2014 18 | Qarabağ | 2 – 0 | Sumgayit | Baku |
| 15:30 AZT (UTC+4) | George 26'; Hüseynov 56' (o.g.); Tagiyev (yellow card) 62'; Garayev (yellow card) 89' | Summary | Mammadov (yellow card) 59'; B.Nasirov (yellow card) 66' | Stadium: Tofiq Bahramov Stadium^{1} Attendance: 1,000; Referee: Ingilab Mämmädov |

| 30 January 2015 19 | Araz-Naxçıvan | – ^{3} | Qarabağ | Nakhchivan |
| AZST (UTC+5) | | [ Summary] | | Stadium: Nakhchivan City Stadium |

| 7 February 2015 20 | Qarabağ | 4 – 1 | Baku | Baku |
| 16:00 AZST (UTC+5) | Medvedev 2'; A.Karimov 7' (o.g.); Richard 26' (pen.), 83' | Summary | N.Novruzov 22' (pen.); T.Gurbatov (yellow card) 38' | Stadium: Tofiq Bahramov Stadium^{1} Attendance: 450; Referee: Omar Paşayev |

| 11 February 2015 21 | AZAL | 0 – 1 | Qarabağ | Baku |
| 15:00 AZT (UTC+4) | Kutsenko (yellow card) 56'; A.Shemonayev (yellow card) 67'; N.Gurbanov (yellow card) 85' | Summary | Reynaldo 57'; Medvedev (yellow card) 60'; George (yellow card) 71'; Tagiyev (yellow card) 73' | Stadium: AZAL Arena; Attendance: 500; Referee: Orkhan Mämmädov |

| 15 February 2015 22 | Qarabağ | 1 – 0 | Simurq | Baku |
| 18:00 AZT (UTC+4) | Muarem (yellow card) 20'; Reynaldo 21' | Summary | Stanojević (yellow card) 63'; Lambot (yellow card) 71' | Stadium: Tofiq Bahramov Stadium^{1} Attendance: 800; Referee: Ramil Diniyev |

| 19 February 2015 23 | Neftchi Baku | 0 – 1 | Qarabağ | Baku |
| 19:00 AZT (UTC+4) | Ramos (yellow card) 36'; Cardoso (yellow card) 57'; Aliyev (yellow card) 66'; Flavinho (yellow card) 71' | Summary | Medvedev (yellow card) 69'; Muarem (yellow card) 71'; Reynaldo 89'; George (yellow card) 90+1'; N.Alasgarov (yellow card) 90+3' | Stadium: Bakcell Arena; Attendance: 4,500; Referee: Aliyar Ağayev |

| 28 February 2015 24 | Qarabağ | 0 – 1 | Gabala | Baku |
| 17:00 AZT (UTC+4) | Medvedev (yellow card) 40'; Sadygov (yellow card) 45' | Summary | Dodô (yellow card) 28'; Ehiosun (yellow card) 34'; N.Alasgarov 44' (o.g.); Abışov (yellow card) 77'; R.Tagizade (yellow card) 82' | Stadium: Tofiq Bahramov Stadium^{1} Attendance: 1,000; Referee: Ingilab Mämmädov |

| 8 March 2015 25 | Qarabağ | 1 – 0 | Khazar Lankaran | Baku |
| 17:00 AZT (UTC+4) | E.Mirzəyev 48' (o.g.) | Summary | E.Mirzəyev (yellow card) 50'; Sankoh (yellow card) 52'; S.Tounkara (yellow card) 57'; E.Rzazadä (yellow card) 59' | Stadium: Tofiq Bahramov Stadium^{1} Attendance: 1,000; Referee: Ramil Diniyev |

| 18 March 2015 26 | Sumgayit | 1 – 2 | Qarabağ | Sumqayit |
| 16:00 AZT (UTC+4) | Agayev 50' | Summary | Reynaldo 52', 69' (yellow card) 70'; Guseynov (yellow card) 54' | Stadium: Kapital Bank Arena; Attendance: 1,500; Referee: Orkhan Mämmädov |

| 2 April 2015 27 | Qarabağ | 0 – 0 | Inter Baku | Baku |
| 18:00 AZST (UTC+5) | Richard (yellow card) 11'; Yusifov (yellow card) 83' | Summary | Stanković (yellow card) 23'; E.Mammadov (yellow card) 73' | Stadium: Tofiq Bahramov Stadium^{1} Attendance: 1,500; Referee: Rahim Häsänov |

| 5 April 2015 29 | Baku | 1 – 1 | Qarabağ | Baku |
| 17:00 AZST (UTC+5) | N.Novruzov 40' (pen.); E.Ahmadov (yellow card) 84' | Summary | Reynaldo 25'; Šehić (yellow card) 87'; Agolli (yellow card) 87' | Stadium: Tofiq Bahramov Stadium; Attendance: 600; Referee: Fariz Yusifov |

| 9 April 2015 29 | Qarabağ | 2 – 1 | AZAL | Baku |
| 17:00 AZST (UTC+5) | George 20'; Sadygov (yellow card) 40'; Nadirov 50' | Summary | S.Asadov 10'; Kutsenko (yellow card) 44'; Juanfran (yellow card) 47'; Mombongo-Dues (yellow card) 67' | Stadium: Tofiq Bahramov Stadium^{1} Attendance: 800; Referee: Rahim Häsänov |

| 16 April 2015 30 | Simurq | 0 – 2 | Qarabağ | Zaqatala |
| 18:00 AZST (UTC+5) | Qirtimov (yellow card) 55'; S.Zargarov (yellow card) 63'; T.Akhundov (yellow card) 90+1' | Summary | Muarem 19', 81'; Agolli (yellow card) 51'; Richard (yellow card) 58'; Medvedev (yellow card) 60' | Stadium: Zaqatala City Stadium; Attendance: 3,500; Referee: Rahim Häsänov |

| 25 April 2015 31 | Qarabağ | 3 – 2 | Neftchi Baku | Baku |
| 19:00 AZST (UTC+5) | Muarem 15' (yellow card) 43'; Tagiyev 29'; George 69'; Agolli (yellow card) 73' | Summary | A.Abdullayev 32' (yellow card) 67'; Ramos (yellow card) 39'; Canales 59'; Cardoso (yellow card) 71' (yellow-red card) 75'; Nfor (yellow card) 81' | Stadium: Tofiq Bahramov Stadium^{1} Attendance: 5,000; Referee: Fariz Yusifov |

| 2 May 2015 32 | Gabala | 1 – 1 | Qarabağ | Qabala |
| 19:00 AZST (UTC+5) | Abışov (yellow card) 36'; Ricardinho (yellow card) 53'; Sadiqov (yellow card) 60'; Huseynov 90' (pen.) | Summary | George (yellow card) 17'; Agolli (yellow card) 41'; Reynaldo 55'; Šehić (yellow card) 89' | Stadium: Gabala City Stadium; Attendance: 3,700; Referee: Elvin Äsgärov |

| 8 May 2015 33 | Khazar Lankaran | 1 – 1 | Qarabağ | Lankaran |
| 18:00 AZST (UTC+5) | Sankoh (yellow card) 45'; A.Ramazanov 78' | Summary | Muarem (yellow card) 26'; George 80'; Sadygov (yellow card) 90+3' | Stadium: Lankaran City Stadium; Attendance: 2,000; Referee: Orkhan Mämmädov |

| 16 May 2015 34 | Qarabağ | 1 – 0 | Sumgayit | Baku |
| 20:00 AZST (UTC+5) | George 33'; Agolli (yellow card) 90+2' | Summary | M.Rahimov (yellow card) 70'; S.Äliyev (yellow card) 90+2' | Stadium: Tofiq Bahramov Stadium^{1} Attendance: 4,000; Referee: Rahim Häsänov |

| 22 May 2015 35 | Inter Baku | 2 – 1 | Qarabağ | Baku |
| 18:00 AZST (UTC+5) | Ismayilov 19'; Dashdemirov 56'; Tskhadadze (yellow card) 76'; Lomaia (yellow card) 90+1' | Summary | Sadygov (yellow card) 28'; George 30'; Reynaldo (yellow card) 42'; Garayev (yellow card) 49' | Stadium: Inter Arena; Attendance: 1,700; Referee: Ingilab Mämmädov |

| 27 May 2015 36 | Qarabağ | – ^{3} | Araz-Naxçıvan | Baku |
| AZST (UTC+5) | | [ Summary] | | Stadium: Tofiq Bahramov Stadium^{1} |

==== League table ====
| Pos | Team | Pld | W | D | L | GF | GA | GD | Pts | Qualification |
|---|---|---|---|---|---|---|---|---|---|---|
| 1 | Qarabağ (C) | 32 | 20 | 8 | 4 | 51 | 28 | +23 | 68 | Qualification for Champions League second qualifying round |
| 2 | Inter Baku | 32 | 17 | 12 | 3 | 55 | 20 | +35 | 63 | Qualification for Europa League first qualifying round |
| 3 | Gabala | 32 | 15 | 9 | 8 | 46 | 35 | +11 | 54 | Qualification for Europa League first qualifying round |
| 4 | Neftchi Baku | 32 | 13 | 10 | 9 | 38 | 33 | +5 | 49 | Qualification for Europa League first qualifying round |
| 5 | Simurq | 32 | 11 | 6 | 15 | 41 | 39 | +2 | 39 | |
| 6 | AZAL | 32 | 10 | 9 | 13 | 37 | 42 | −5 | 39 | |
| 7 | Khazar Lankaran | 32 | 8 | 8 | 16 | 35 | 46 | −11 | 32 | |
| 8 | Sumgayit | 32 | 7 | 10 | 15 | 32 | 43 | −11 | 31 | |
| 9 | Baku | 32 | 3 | 8 | 21 | 19 | 68 | −49 | 17 | Relegation to the Azerbaijan First Division |
| 10 | Araz-Naxçıvan (Note: Araz-Naxçıvan were officially withdrawn from the league on 17 November 2014) | 0 | 0 | 0 | 0 | 0 | 0 | 0 | 0 | Team withdrawn |

Source: uefa.com
Rules for classification: 1) points; 2) head-to-head points; 3) head-to-head goal difference; 4) head-to-head goals scored; 5. head-to-head away goals (only if 2 teams are tied); 6) goal difference; 7) goals scored.
(C) Champions

=== Azerbaijan Cup ===
| 3 December 2014 Second round | Qarabağ | 4 – 2 | MOIK Baku | Baku |
| 15:30 AZT (UTC+4) | Emeghara 6'; Richard 7'; Valiyev (yellow card) 33'; Medvedev 49'; S.Aliyev (yellow card) 52'; Nadirov 71' | Summary | R.Qavami 35'; R. Nəcəfov 88' | Stadium: Tofiq Bahramov Stadium^{1} Attendance: 100; Referee: Xalil Xälilov |

| 4 March 2015 Quarterfinals 1st leg | Qarabağ | 3 – 0 | Baku | Baku |
| 17:00 AZT (UTC+4) | Reynaldo 6', 32'; Nadirov 24'; Teli (yellow card) 66' | Summary | | Stadium: Tofiq Bahramov Stadium^{1} Attendance: 500; Referee: Vusal Äliyev |

| 13 March 2015 Quarterfinals 2nd leg | Baku | 1 – 4 (1 – 7 agg.) | Qarabağ | Baku |
| 15:00 AZT (UTC+4) | Madatov 5' G.Aliyev (yellow card) 9' | Summary | Nadirov 12', 58', 69'; Garayev (yellow card) 27'; Taghiyev 56' | Stadium: Tofiq Bahramov Stadium; Attendance: 300; Referee: Xalili Xälilov |

| 13 April 2015 Semifinal 1st leg | Qarabağ | 1 – 0 | Simurq | Baku |
| 18:00 AZST (UTC+5) | Tagiyev 15'; Medvedev (yellow card) 27' | Summary | Qirtimov (yellow card) 66' | Stadium: Tofiq Bahramov Stadium^{1} Attendance: 1,400; Referee: Aliyar Ağayev |

| 21 April 2015 Semifinal 2nd leg | Simurq | 0 – 0 (0 – 1 agg.) | Qarabağ | Zaqatala |
| 18:00 AZST (UTC+5) | E.Abdullayev (yellow card) 85'; Kapsa (yellow card) 90+3' | Summary | George (yellow card) 40' | Stadium: Zaqatala City Stadium; Attendance: 3,000; Referee: Orkhan Mämmädov |

==== Final ====
| 3 June 2015 Final | Qarabağ | 3 – 1 | Neftchi Baku | Qabala |
| 20:00 AZST (UTC+5) | Reynaldo 5', 39'; Muarem 85' | Summary | Nfor 77'; Cardoso (yellow card) 81' | Stadium: Gabala City Stadium; Attendance: 4,500; Referee: Rähim Häsänov |

=== UEFA Champions League ===
==== Qualifying phase ====
| 15 July 2014 2nd qualifying round 1st leg | Valletta (Malta) | 0 – 1 | (Azerbaijan) Qarabağ | Attard, Malta |
| 22:30 AZST (UTC+5) | Briffa (yellow card) 71'; Camilleri (red card) 85'; Faria (yellow card) 90+2' | Report | Chumbinho 18' | Stadium: Ta' Qali Stadium; Attendance: 1,200; Referee: Adrien Jaccottet (Switzerland) |

| 22 July 2014 2nd qualifying round 2nd leg | Qarabağ (Azerbaijan) | 4 – 0 (5 – 0 agg.) | (Malta) Valletta | Baku, Azerbaijan |
| 21:30 AZST (UTC+5) | Reynaldo 15'; Chumbinho 48'; Dias 56'; George (yellow card) 73' (goal) 80' | Report | Bajada (yellow card) 19'; Caruana (red card) 19'; Dimech (yellow card) 60'; Faria (yellow card) 73'; Fenech (yellow card) 81' (yellow-red card) 84' | Stadium: Tofiq Bahramov Stadium^{1} Attendance: 23,350; Referee: Sergey Tsinkevich (Belarus) |

| 30 July 2014 3rd qualifying round 1st leg | Qarabağ (Azerbaijan) | 2 – 1 | (Austria) Red Bull Salzburg | Baku, Azerbaijan |
| 20:30 AZST (UTC+5) | Dias 2'; Richard (yellow card) 32'; Teli (yellow card) 40' (yellow-red card) 42'; Garayev (yellow card) 43'; Guseynov (yellow card) 55'; Reynaldo 86' (red card) 88' | Report | Leitgeb (yellow card) 31'; Schwegler (red card) 34'; Hinteregger (yellow card) 59'; Soriano 77'; Kampl (yellow card) 90+2' | Stadium: Tofiq Bahramov Stadium^{1} Attendance: 31,000; Referee: Serhiy Boyko (Ukraine) |

| 6 August 2014 3rd qualifying round 2nd leg | Red Bull Salzburg (Austria) | 2 – 0 (3 – 2 agg.) | (Azerbaijan) Qarabağ | Salzburg, Austria |
| 23:30 AZST (UTC+5) | Hinteregger 18', 34' | Report | Medvedev (yellow card) 32'; Dias (yellow card) 36'; Yusifov (yellow card) 88' | Stadium: Red Bull Arena; Attendance: 20,716; Referee: Bobby Madden (Scotland) |

=== UEFA Europa League ===
==== Qualifying phase ====
| 21 August 2014 Play-off round 1st leg | Qarabağ (Azerbaijan) | 0 – 0 | (Netherlands) Twente | Baku, Azerbaijan |
| 21:00 AZST (UTC+5) | Medvedev (yellow card) 35' | Report | Castaignos (yellow card) 35'; Kusk (yellow card) 45'; Hölscher (yellow card) 87' | Stadium: Tofiq Bahramov Stadium^{1} Attendance: 28,000; Referee: Manuel Gräfe (Germany) |

| 28 August 2014 Play-off round 2nd leg | Twente (Netherlands) | 1 – 1 (1 – 1(a) agg.) | (Azerbaijan) Qarabağ | Enschede, Netherlands |
| 22:30 AZST (UTC+5) | Castaignos 37'; Medvedev (yellow card) 87' | Report | Muarem 51' | Stadium: De Grolsch Veste; Referee: Paolo Mazzoleni (Italy) |

==== Group stage ====
| Pos | Team | Pld | W | D | L | GF | GA | GD | Pts | Qualification | INT | DNI | QAR | SET |
|---|---|---|---|---|---|---|---|---|---|---|---|---|---|---|
| 1 | (Italy) Internazionale | 6 | 3 | 3 | 0 | 6 | 2 | +4 | 12 | Advance to knockout phase | — | 2–1 | 2–0 | 0–0 |
| 2 | (Ukraine) Dnipro Dnipropetrovsk | 6 | 2 | 1 | 3 | 4 | 5 | −1 | 7 | Advance to knockout phase | 0–1 | — | 0–1 | 1–0 |
| 3 | (Azerbaijan) Qarabağ | 6 | 1 | 3 | 2 | 3 | 5 | −2 | 6 | | 0–0 | 1–2 | — | 0–0 |
| 4 | (France) Saint-Étienne | 6 | 0 | 5 | 1 | 2 | 3 | −1 | 5 | | 1–1 | 0–0 | 1–1 | — |

Source: Soccerway
Rules for classification: Group stage tiebreakers

| 18 September 2014 1 | Qarabağ (Azerbaijan) | 0 – 0 | (France) Saint-Étienne | Baku, Azerbaijan |
| 21:00 AZST (UTC+5) | | Report | Clément (yellow card) 64'; Gradel (yellow card) 67' | Stadium: Tofiq Bahramov Stadium^{1} Attendance: 28,786; Referee: Steven McLean (Scotland) |

| 3 October 2014 2 | Internazionale (Italy) | 2 – 0 | (Azerbaijan) Qarabağ | Milan, Italy |
| 00:05 AZST (UTC+5) | D'Ambrosio 18'; Juan (yellow card) 80'; Medel (yellow card) 82'; Icardi 85' | Report | Muarem (yellow card) 90+5' | Stadium: San Siro; Attendance: 28,435; Referee: Aleksei Kulbakov (Belarus) |

| 24 October 2014 3 | Dnipro Dnipropetrovsk (Ukraine) | 0 – 1 | (Azerbaijan) Qarabağ | Kyiv^{2}, Ukraine |
| 00:05 AZST (UTC+5) | Fedetskyi (yellow card) 8'; Kravchenko (yellow card) 19'; Rotan (yellow card) 53'; Konoplyanka (yellow card) 59' | Report | Muarem 21'; Nadirov (yellow card) 25'; Garayev (yellow card) 50'; Agolli (yellow card) 53'; Medvedev (yellow card) 84' | Stadium: Olympic Stadium; Attendance: 3,120; Referee: Libor Kovařík (Czech Republic) |

| 6 November 2014 4 | Qarabağ (Azerbaijan) | 1 – 2 | (Ukraine) Dnipro Dnipropetrovsk | Baku, Azerbaijan |
| 21:00 AZT (UTC+4) | George 36'; Guseynov (yellow card) 45' | Report | Kalinić 15', 73' (yellow card) 45+1'; Zozulya (yellow card) 30'; Strinić (yellow card) 30'; Kankava (yellow card) 49'; Rotan (yellow card) 51' | Stadium: Tofiq Bahramov Stadium^{1} Attendance: 31,000; Referee: Paweł Gil (Poland) |

| 28 November 2014 5 | Saint-Étienne (France) | 1 – 1 | (Azerbaijan) Qarabağ | Saint-Étienne, France |
| 00:05 AZT (UTC+4) | Van Wolfswinkel 21'; Lemoine (yellow card) 90+3' | Report | Nadirov 15' George (yellow card) 48'; Medvedev (yellow card) 74' | Stadium: Stade Geoffroy-Guichard; Attendance: 29,769; Referee: Kristinn Jakobsson (Iceland) |

| 11 December 2014 6 | Qarabağ (Azerbaijan) | 0 – 0 | (Italy) Internazionale | Baku, Azerbaijan |
| 21:00 AZT (UTC+4) | N.Alasgarov (yellow card) 18' | Report | | Stadium: Tofiq Bahramov Stadium^{1} Attendance: 31,200; Referee: Miroslav Zelinka (Czech Republic) |

== Squad statistics ==
As of Match played 3 June 2015

=== Appearances and goals ===
| No. | Pos | Nat | Player | Total | | Premier League | | Azerbaijan Cup | | Champions League | | Europa League | |
| No. | Pos | Nat | Player | Apps | Goals | Apps | Goals | Apps | Goals | Apps | Goals | Apps | Goals |
|---|---|---|---|---|---|---|---|---|---|---|---|---|---|
| 1 | GK | (Azerbaijan) AZE | Farhad Valiyev | 6 | 0 | 3 | 0 | 3 | 0 | 0 | 0 | 0 | 0 |
| 2 | DF | (Azerbaijan) AZE | Gara Garayev | 47 | 0 | 23+7 | 0 | 4+1 | 0 | 4 | 0 | 8 | 0 |
| 3 | DF | (Azerbaijan) AZE | Tarlan Guliyev | 10 | 0 | 7 | 0 | 1 | 0 | 0+2 | 0 | 0 | 0 |
| 5 | DF | (Azerbaijan) AZE | Maksim Medvedev | 37 | 2 | 23 | 1 | 5 | 1 | 2 | 0 | 7 | 0 |
| 6 | DF | (Azerbaijan) AZE | Haji Ahmadov | 17 | 0 | 7+6 | 0 | 2+2 | 0 | 0 | 0 | 0 | 0 |
| 7 | MF | (Azerbaijan) AZE | Namiq Yusifov | 37 | 0 | 11+12 | 0 | 2+2 | 0 | 0+4 | 0 | 4+2 | 0 |
| 9 | FW | (Brazil) BRA | Reynaldo | 37 | 16 | 21+3 | 10 | 3+1 | 4 | 3 | 2 | 6 | 0 |
| 10 | MF | (North Macedonia) MKD | Muarem Muarem | 43 | 10 | 24+5 | 7 | 4+1 | 1 | 1 | 0 | 8 | 2 |
| 11 | FW | (Brazil) BRA | Danilo Dias | 15 | 2 | 2+4 | 0 | 1+1 | 0 | 3+1 | 2 | 1+2 | 0 |
| 13 | GK | (Bosnia and Herzegovina) BIH | Ibrahim Šehić | 44 | 0 | 29 | 0 | 3 | 0 | 4 | 0 | 8 | 0 |
| 14 | DF | (Azerbaijan) AZE | Rashad Sadygov | 36 | 0 | 20+1 | 0 | 5 | 0 | 1+1 | 0 | 7+1 | 0 |
| 17 | FW | (Azerbaijan) AZE | Vüqar Nadirov | 42 | 10 | 15+11 | 4 | 4+1 | 5 | 1+2 | 0 | 4+4 | 1 |
| 18 | MF | (Azerbaijan) AZE | Ilgar Gurbanov | 23 | 2 | 9+3 | 2 | 1+3 | 0 | 3+1 | 0 | 1+2 | 0 |
| 20 | MF | (Brazil) BRA | Richard | 48 | 4 | 25+6 | 3 | 5 | 1 | 4 | 0 | 8 | 0 |
| 21 | FW | (Azerbaijan) AZE | Tural Rzayev | 1 | 0 | 0+1 | 0 | 0 | 0 | 0 | 0 | 0 | 0 |
| 23 | FW | (Azerbaijan) AZE | Tural Isgandarov | 2 | 0 | 0 | 0 | 1+1 | 0 | 0 | 0 | 0 | 0 |
| 24 | DF | (Albania) ALB | Admir Teli | 29 | 0 | 14+4 | 0 | 3+1 | 0 | 3 | 0 | 1+3 | 0 |
| 25 | DF | (Albania) ALB | Ansi Agolli | 42 | 0 | 24+2 | 0 | 4 | 0 | 4 | 0 | 8 | 0 |
| 33 | DF | (Azerbaijan) AZE | Shahriyar Aliyev | 3 | 0 | 2 | 0 | 1 | 0 | 0 | 0 | 0 | 0 |
| 41 | FW | (Netherlands) NED | Leroy George | 42 | 12 | 27 | 10 | 4+1 | 0 | 4 | 1 | 6 | 1 |
| 55 | DF | (Azerbaijan) AZE | Badavi Guseynov | 43 | 1 | 28 | 1 | 3 | 0 | 4 | 0 | 8 | 0 |
| 70 | MF | (Brazil) BRA | Chumbinho | 10 | 4 | 3+1 | 2 | 0 | 0 | 3+1 | 2 | 2 | 0 |
| 77 | MF | (Azerbaijan) AZE | Javid Tagiyev | 37 | 4 | 21+8 | 2 | 4 | 2 | 0 | 0 | 0+4 | 0 |
| 99 | FW | (Azerbaijan) AZE | Namig Alasgarov | 26 | 1 | 9+9 | 1 | 1+2 | 0 | 0 | 0 | 1+4 | 0 |
Players who appeared for Qarabağ but left during the season:
| 8 | FW | (Switzerland) SUI | Innocent Emeghara | 8 | 5 | 5+2 | 4 | 1 | 1 | 0 | 0 | 0 | 0 |

=== Goal scorers ===
| Place | Position | Nation | Number | Name | Premier League | Azerbaijan Cup | Champions League | Europa League | Total |
|---|---|---|---|---|---|---|---|---|---|
| 1 | FW | (Brazil) | 9 | Reynaldo | 10 | 4 | 2 | 0 | 16 |
| 2 | FW | (Netherlands) | 41 | Leroy George | 10 | 0 | 1 | 1 | 12 |
| 3 | MF | (North Macedonia) | 10 | Muarem Muarem | 7 | 1 | 0 | 2 | 10 |
| 3 | FW | (Azerbaijan) | 17 | Vüqar Nadirov | 4 | 5 | 0 | 1 | 10 |
| 5 | FW | (Switzerland) | 8 | Innocent Emeghara | 4 | 1 | 0 | 0 | 5 |
| 6 | MF | (Brazil) | 20 | Richard | 3 | 1 | 0 | 0 | 4 |
| 6 | MF | (Brazil) | 70 | Chumbinho | 2 | 0 | 2 | 0 | 4 |
| 6 | MF | (Azerbaijan) | 77 | Javid Tagiyev | 2 | 2 | 0 | 0 | 4 |
| 6 | | | | Own goal | 4 | 0 | 0 | 0 | 4 |
| 11 | MF | (Azerbaijan) | 18 | Ilgar Gurbanov | 2 | 0 | 0 | 0 | 2 |
| 11 | DF | (Azerbaijan) | 5 | Maksim Medvedev | 1 | 1 | 0 | 0 | 2 |
| 11 | FW | (Brazil) | 11 | Danilo Dias | 0 | 0 | 2 | 0 | 2 |
| 14 | FW | (Azerbaijan) | 99 | Namig Alasgarov | 1 | 0 | 0 | 0 | 1 |
| 14 | DF | (Azerbaijan) | 55 | Badavi Guseynov | 1 | 0 | 0 | 0 | 1 |
| | | | | TOTALS | 51 | 15 | 7 | 1 | 74 |

=== Disciplinary record ===
| Number | Nation | Position | Name | Premier League | | Azerbaijan Cup | | Champions League | | Europa League | | Total | |
| Number | Nation | Position | Name | Yellow card | Red card | Yellow card | Red card | Yellow card | Red card | Yellow card | Red card | Yellow card | Red card |
| 1 | (Azerbaijan) | GK | Farhad Valiyev | 0 | 0 | 1 | 0 | 0 | 0 | 0 | 0 | 1 | 0 |
| 2 | (Azerbaijan) | DF | Gara Garayev | 4 | 0 | 1 | 0 | 1 | 0 | 2 | 0 | 8 | 0 |
| 3 | (Azerbaijan) | DF | Tarlan Guliyev | 1 | 0 | 0 | 0 | 1 | 0 | 0 | 0 | 2 | 0 |
| 5 | (Azerbaijan) | DF | Maksim Medvedev | 4 | 0 | 1 | 0 | 1 | 0 | 3 | 0 | 9 | 0 |
| 7 | (Azerbaijan) | MF | Namiq Yusifov | 2 | 0 | 0 | 0 | 1 | 0 | 0 | 0 | 3 | 0 |
| 8 | (Switzerland) | FW | Innocent Emeghara | 1 | 0 | 0 | 0 | 0 | 0 | 0 | 0 | 1 | 0 |
| 9 | (Brazil) | FW | Reynaldo | 5 | 0 | 0 | 0 | 0 | 1 | 0 | 0 | 5 | 1 |
| 10 | (North Macedonia) | MF | Muarem Muarem | 4 | 0 | 0 | 0 | 0 | 0 | 0 | 1 | 4 | 1 |
| 11 | (Brazil) | FW | Danilo Dias | 0 | 0 | 0 | 0 | 0 | 1 | 0 | 0 | 0 | 1 |
| 13 | (Bosnia and Herzegovina) | GK | Ibrahim Šehić | 3 | 0 | 0 | 0 | 0 | 0 | 0 | 0 | 3 | 0 |
| 14 | (Azerbaijan) | DF | Rashad Sadygov | 5 | 0 | 0 | 0 | 0 | 0 | 0 | 0 | 5 | 0 |
| 17 | (Azerbaijan) | FW | Vüqar Nadirov | 2 | 0 | 0 | 0 | 0 | 0 | 1 | 0 | 3 | 0 |
| 18 | (Azerbaijan) | MF | Ilgar Gurbanov | 1 | 0 | 0 | 0 | 0 | 0 | 0 | 0 | 1 | 0 |
| 20 | (Brazil) | MF | Richard | 5 | 0 | 0 | 0 | 1 | 0 | 0 | 0 | 6 | 0 |
| 24 | (Albania) | DF | Admir Teli | 4 | 0 | 1 | 0 | 2 | 1 | 0 | 0 | 7 | 1 |
| 25 | (Albania) | DF | Ansi Agolli | 5 | 0 | 0 | 0 | 0 | 0 | 1 | 0 | 6 | 0 |
| 33 | (Azerbaijan) | DF | Shahriyar Aliyev | 0 | 0 | 1 | 0 | 0 | 0 | 0 | 0 | 1 | 0 |
| 41 | (Netherlands) | FW | Leroy George | 5 | 0 | 1 | 0 | 1 | 0 | 1 | 0 | 8 | 0 |
| 55 | (Azerbaijan) | DF | Badavi Guseynov | 2 | 0 | 0 | 0 | 1 | 0 | 1 | 0 | 4 | 0 |
| 77 | (Azerbaijan) | MF | Javid Tagiyev | 2 | 0 | 0 | 0 | 0 | 0 | 0 | 0 | 2 | 0 |
| 99 | (Azerbaijan) | FW | Namig Alasgarov | 2 | 0 | 0 | 0 | 0 | 0 | 1 | 0 | 3 | 0 |
| | | | TOTALS | 57 | 0 | 6 | 0 | 10 | 2 | 11 | 0 | 84 | 2 |

== Notes ==
- Qarabağ have played their home games at the Tofiq Bahramov Stadium since 1993 due to the ongoing situation in Quzanlı.
- Dnipro Dnipropetrovsk will play their home matches at Olympic Stadium, Kyiv instead of their regular stadium, Dnipro-Arena, Dnipropetrovsk, due to the pro-Russian unrest in Ukraine.
- Araz-Naxçıvan were excluded from the Azerbaijan Premier League on 17 November 2014, with all their results being annulled.
