= 2010–11 FK Qarabağ season =

Qarabağ
2010–11 season
- Chairman: Tahir Gözal
- Manager: Gurban Gurbanov
- Stadium: Tofiq Bahramov Stadium^{1}
- Premier League: 3rd
- Azerbaijan Cup: Last 16 vs Turan Tovuz
- Europa League: Play-off round vs Borussia Dortmund
- Top goalscorer: League: Giorgi Adamia (18); All: Giorgi Adamia (19)
- Highest home attendance: 29,500^{1} vs Wisła Kraków; 5 August 2010
- Lowest home attendance: 100 vs Simurq; 17 October 2010
- Average home league attendance: 4,436
Home colours	Away colours

The Qarabağ 2010–11 season was Qarabağ's 18th Azerbaijan Premier League season, and their third season under Gurban Gurbanov. They finished the season in 3rd place, and were knocked out of the 2010–11 Azerbaijan Cup at the Last 16 stage by Turan Tovuz. They also participated in the 2010–11 UEFA Europa League, entering at the first qualifying round stage. They beat Metalurg Skopje of Macedonia, before beating Portadown of Northern Ireland in the second qualifying round. Next they beat Wisła Kraków of Poland in the second qualifying round to make them the first Azerbaijani team to reach the Play-off Round of the Europa League. In this round they were defeated by Borussia Dortmund of Germany 5-0 on aggregate.

== Squad ==
Note: Flags indicate national team as defined under FIFA eligibility rules; some limited exceptions apply. Players may hold more than one non-FIFA nationality.

No.	Pos.	Nation	Player
1	GK	AZE	Farhad Veliyev
2	DF	AZE	Gara Garayev
3	DF	AZE	Aftandil Hajiyev
4	DF	AZE	Zaur Hashimov
5	DF	AZE	Maksim Medvedev
6	MF	AZE	Rashad Sadigov (captain)
7	MF	AZE	Namiq Yusifov (vice captain)
8	MF	AZE	Aslan Kerimov
9	MF	AZE	Elvin Mammadov
10	MF	AZE	Emin Imamaliev
11	FW	AZE	Rauf Aliyev
12	GK	AZE	Sahil Kerimov
13	DF	AZE	Samir Abbasov
14	DF	AZE	Rashad Sadygov

No.	Pos.	Nation	Player
15	MF	AZE	Aykhan Abbasov
16	MF	AZE	Rashad Kerimov
17	FW	AZE	Vügar Nadirov
18	MF	AZE	Ilgar Gurbanov
19	MF	LAT	Andrejs Rubins
20	MF	MKD	Nderim Nedzipi
21	FW	AZE	Murad Sattarli
22	MF	AZE	Afran Ismayilov
23	FW	AZE	Tural Isgandarov
24	DF	ALB	Admir Teli
25	DF	ALB	Ansi Agolli
72	MF	TUR	Devran Ayhan
77	FW	GEO	Giorgi Adamia
99	GK	SRB	Bojan Pavlović

== Transfers ==
=== Summer ===
In: Note: Flags indicate national team as defined under FIFA eligibility rules; some limited exceptions apply. Players may hold more than one non-FIFA nationality.

No.	Pos.	Nation	Player
13	DF	AZE	Samir Abbasov (from (Azerbaijan) Inter Baku)
19	MF	LAT	Andrejs Rubins (from (Azerbaijan) Inter Baku)
25	DF	ALB	Ansi Agolli (loan from (Ukraine) Kryvbas Kryvyi Rih)
72	MF	TUR	Devran Ayhan (from (Azerbaijan) Khazar Lankaran)

Out: Note: Flags indicate national team as defined under FIFA eligibility rules; some limited exceptions apply. Players may hold more than one non-FIFA nationality.

No.	Pos.	Nation	Player
14	DF	AZE	Rashad Sadygov (to (Turkey) Eskişehirspor)

=== Winter ===
In: Note: Flags indicate national team as defined under FIFA eligibility rules; some limited exceptions apply. Players may hold more than one non-FIFA nationality.

No.	Pos.	Nation	Player
14	DF	AZE	Rashad Sadygov (from (Turkey) Eskişehirspor)
18	MF	AZE	Ilgar Gurbanov (from (Turkey) Mersin İdmanyurdu)
20	MF	MKD	Nderim Nexhipi (from (Belgium) Lierse S.K.)
99	MF	SRB	Bojan Pavlović (from (Serbia) Red Star Belgrade)

Out: Note: Flags indicate national team as defined under FIFA eligibility rules; some limited exceptions apply. Players may hold more than one non-FIFA nationality.

No.	Pos.	Nation	Player

== Competitions ==
=== Azerbaijan Premier League ===
==== First round ====
===== Results =====
8 August 2010 1	Neftchi Baku	1 - 1	Qarabağ	Baku
21:00 AZST (UTC+5)	Nasimov 88'	Summary	R.F.Sadygov 80'	Stadium: Tofiq Bahramov Stadium; Attendance: 2,000; Referee: Fariz Yusifov

21 August 2010 3	MOIK Baku	0 - 1	Qarabağ	Baku
18:00 AZST (UTC+5)		Summary	Adamia 78'	Stadium: Shafa Stadium; Attendance: 250; Referee: Jeyhun Hashimov

11 September 2010 5	Inter Baku	1 - 0	Qarabağ	Baku
19:00 AZST (UTC+5)	Chertoganov 12'	Summary		Stadium: Shafa Stadium; Attendance: 1,200; Referee: Vusal Aliyev

19 September 2010 6	Qarabağ	0 - 0	AZAL	Baku
17:10 AZST (UTC+5)		Summary		Stadium: Tofiq Bahramov Stadium^{1} Attendance: 300; Referee: Rovshan Ahmadov

22 September 2010 2	Qarabağ	3 - 0	FK Ganja	Baku
17:00 AZST (UTC+5)	R.A.Sadigov 32'; Aliyev 54'; Adamia 78'	Summary		Stadium: Tofiq Bahramov Stadium^{1} Attendance: 500; Referee: Elchin Mämmädov

25 September 2010 7	Gabala	2 - 1	Qarabağ	Qabala
17:00 AZST (UTC+5)	Burton 57'; Subašić 72'	Report; Summary	Imamaliyev 83'	Stadium: Gabala City Stadium; Attendance: 1500; Referee: Afgan Hamzayev

2 October 2010 8	Turan Tovuz	0 - 1	Qarabağ	Tovuz
16:00 AZST (UTC+5)		Summary	Imamaliev 55'	Stadium: Tovuz City Stadium; Attendance: 2,500; Referee: Ramil Diniyev

17 October 2010 9	Qarabağ	3 - 2	Simurq	Baku
15:20 AZST (UTC+5)	Adamia 52'; Aliyev 77'; R.A.Sadigov 88'	Summary	Tskhadadze 46'; Mikayılov 73'	Stadium: Tofiq Bahramov Stadium^{1} Attendance: 100; Referee: Elvin Askerov

20 October 2010 4	Qarabağ	2 - 0	Baku	Baku
16:00 AZST (UTC+5)	Adamia 25', 66'	Summary		Stadium: Tofiq Bahramov Stadium^{1} Attendance: 500; Referee: Elchin Mämmädov

24 October 2010 10	FK Mughan	0 - 0	Qarabağ	Salyan
15:00 AZST (UTC+5)		Summary		Stadium: Salyan Olympic Stadium; Attendance: 800; Referee: Fariz Yusifov

30 October 2010 11	Qarabağ	0 - 1	Khazar Lankaran	Baku
AZT (UTC+4)		Summary	Arbănaş 66'	Stadium: Tofiq Bahramov Stadium^{1} Attendance: 2,000; Referee: Rovshan Ahmadov

5 November 2010 12	Qarabağ	3 - 0	MOIK Baku	Baku
14:00 AZT (UTC+4)	Adamia 17'; Aliyev 44', 49'	Summary		Stadium: Tofiq Bahramov Stadium^{1} Attendance: 200; Referee: Rahim Hasanov

13 November 2010 13	Baku	2 - 0	Qarabağ	Baku
16:00 AZT (UTC+4)	Borbiconi 17'; Leo Rocha 90+3'	Summary		Stadium: Tofik Bakhramov Stadium; Attendance: 500; Referee: Fariz Yusifov

21 November 2010 14	AZAL	2 - 0	Qarabağ	Baku
14:00 AZT (UTC+4)	Benouahi 75', 84'	Summary		Stadium: Shafa Stadium; Attendance: 600; Referee: Elchin Mämmädov

28 November 2010 15	Qarabağ	0 - 1	Neftchi Baku	Baku
15:00 AZT (UTC+4)		Summary	Abishov 56'	Stadium: Tofiq Bahramov Stadium^{1} Attendance: 2,500; Referee: Rovshan Ahmadov

4 December 2010 16	Qarabağ	1 - 0	Inter Baku	Baku
14:00 AZT (UTC+4)	Aliyev 45'	Summary		Stadium: Tofiq Bahramov Stadium^{1} Attendance: 1,500; Referee: Vusal Aliyev

11 December 2010 17	Simurq	0 - 1	Qarabağ	Zaqatala
14:00 AZT (UTC+4)		Summary	Hajiyev 77'	Stadium: Zaqatala City Stadium; Attendance: 600; Referee: Afgan Hamzayev

18 December 2010 18	Qarabağ	2 - 0	FK Mughan	Baku
13:00 AZT (UTC+4)	R.A.Sadigov 40'; Nadirov 59'	Summary		Stadium: Tofiq Bahramov Stadium^{1} Attendance: 1,500; Referee: Jeyhun Hashimov

23 December 2010 19	Khazar Lankaran	1 - 2	Qarabağ	Lankaran
17:00 AZT (UTC+4)	Gurbanov 15'	Summary	Aliyev 4', 75'	Stadium: Lankaran City Stadium; Attendance: 11,000; Referee: Rovshan Ahmadov

12 February 2011 20	Qarabağ	3 - 0	Gabala	Baku
14:00 AZT (UTC+4)	Aliyev 14'; Adamia 63'; Ismayilov 73'	Report; Summary		Stadium: Tofiq Bahramov Stadium^{1} Attendance: 1500; Referee: Elchin Mammadov

20 February 2011 21	FK Ganja	0 - 1	Qarabağ	Ganja
13:00 AZT (UTC+4)		Summary	Adamia 72'	Stadium: Ganja City Stadium; Attendance: 6,500; Referee: Anar Salmanov

25 February 2011 22	Qarabağ	5 - 1	Turan Tovuz	Baku
AZT (UTC+4)	Mammadov 9'; Adamia 10', 16'; Aliyev 53'; Teli 90'	Summary	Aliyev 57'	Stadium: Tofiq Bahramov Stadium^{1} Attendance: 300; Referee: Aliyar Ağayev

===== Table =====
Pos	Team	Pld	W	D	L	GF	GA	GD	Pts	Qualification
1	Neftçi Baku	22	14	6	2	40	9	+31	48	Qualification for championship group
2	Khazar Lankaran	22	14	5	3	28	12	+16	47	Qualification for championship group
3	Qarabağ	22	13	3	6	30	14	+16	42	Qualification for championship group
4	Inter Baku	22	12	4	6	24	16	+8	40	Qualification for championship group
5	AZAL	22	9	9	4	27	16	+11	36	Qualification for championship group

Source: Soccerway.com
Rules for classification: 1) points; 2) goal difference; 3) number of goals scored.

==== Championship group ====
===== Results =====
12 March 2011 23	Inter Baku	0 - 2	Qarabağ	Baku
16:00 AZT (UTC+4)		Summary	Aliyev 58'; Adamia 74'	Stadium: Shafa Stadium; Attendance: 1,500; Referee: Fariz Yusifov

18 March 2011 24	Qarabağ	1 - 0	AZAL	Baku
14:00 AZT (UTC+4)	Adamia 31' (pen.)	Summary		Stadium: Tofiq Bahramov Stadium^{1} Attendance: 550; Referee: Anar Salmanov

3 April 2011 25	Neftchi Baku	2 - 0	Qarabağ	Baku
16:00 AZST (UTC+5)	Rodriguinho 3'; Flavinho 60'	Summary		Stadium: Tofik Bakhramov Stadium; Attendance: 5,000; Referee: Rovshan Ahmadov

10 April 2011 26	Qarabağ	0 - 0	Khazar Lankaran	Baku
16:00 AZST (UTC+5)		Summary	Diego Souza (yellow card) 67' (yellow-red card) 90'	Stadium: Tofiq Bahramov Stadium^{1} Attendance: 2,800; Referee: Fariz Yusifov

16 April 2011 27	Baku	0 - 0	Qarabağ	Baku
18:00 AZST (UTC+5)		Summary		Stadium: Tofig Bahramov Stadium; Attendance: 500; Referee: Elchin Mämmädov

24 April 2011 28	Qarabağ	1 - 0	Inter Baku	Baku
16:30 AZST (UTC+5)	Adamia 76' (pen.)	Summary		Stadium: Tofiq Bahramov Stadium^{1} Attendance: 1,500; Referee: Ramil Diniyev

1 May 2011 29	Qarabağ	2 - 2	Baku	Baku
16:00 AZST (UTC+5)	Adamia 60'; Teli 90'	Summary	Hashimov 22' (o.g.); Javadov 26'	Stadium: Tofiq Bahramov Stadium^{1} Attendance: 1,500; Referee: Anar Salmanov

7 May 2011 30	Khazar Lankaran	1 - 1	Qarabağ	Lankaran
20:00 AZST (UTC+5)	Opara 16'	Summary	Gurbanov 90+1'	Stadium: Lankaran City Stadium; Attendance: 11,000; Referee: Fariz Yusifov

13 May 2011 31	Qarabağ	3 - 0	Neftchi Baku	Baku
15:00 AZST (UTC+5)	Adamia 5', 13', 49' (pen.)	Summary		Stadium: Tofiq Bahramov Stadium^{1} Attendance: 3,000; Referee: Elchin Mämmädov

18 May 2011 32	AZAL	3 - 1	Qarabağ	Baku
20:00 AZST (UTC+5)	Limani 41'; Bunjevčević 43'; Krastovchev 88'	Summary	Adamia 12'	Stadium: Shafa Stadium; Attendance: 2,000; Referee: Fariz Yusifov

===== Table =====
Pos	Team	Pld	W	D	L	GF	GA	GD	Pts	Qualification
1	Neftçi Baku (C)	32	19	10	3	53	17	+36	67	Qualification for Champions League second qualifying round
2	Khazar Lankaran	32	16	12	4	38	18	+20	60	Qualification for Europa League second qualifying round (Note: Khazar Lankaran won the 2010–11 Azerbaijan Cup and therefore qualified for the second qualifying round of the 2011–12 UEFA Europa League.)
3	Qarabağ	32	17	7	8	41	22	+19	58	Qualification for Europa League first qualifying round
4	AZAL	32	13	10	9	36	28	+8	49	Qualification for Europa League first qualifying round
5	Inter Baku	32	13	10	9	29	24	+5	49	
6	Baku	32	10	10	12	33	32	+1	40	

Source: Soccerway.com
Rules for classification: 1) points; 2) goal difference; 3) number of goals scored.
(C) Champions

=== Azerbaijan Cup ===
7 December 2010 Last 16	Qarabağ	0 – 0 (3 - 4 p)	Turan Tovuz	Baku
13:30 AZT (UTC+4)	Nadirov (yellow card) 106'	Report	Müslümzadä (yellow card) 31'	Stadium: Tofiq Bahramov Stadium; Attendance: 400; Referee: Ramil Diniyev

=== UEFA Europa League ===
==== Qualifying phase ====
1 July 2010 1st qualifying round 1st leg	Qarabağ (Azerbaijan)	4 – 1	(North Macedonia) Metalurg Skopje	Baku, Azerbaijan
21:00 AZST (UTC+5)	Sadygov 26'; Ismayilov 45'; Teli (yellow card) 32' (red card) 51'; Imamaliev 84'; Adamia 90+2'	Report	Simonovski 90+4'	Stadium: Tofiq Bahramov Stadium^{1} Attendance: 6,000; Referee: István Kovács (Romania)

8 July 2010 1st qualifying round 2nd leg	Metalurg Skopje (North Macedonia)	1 – 1 (2 – 5 agg.)	(Azerbaijan) Qarabağ	Skopje, Macedonia
21:00 AZST (UTC+5)	Krstev 78'	Report	Imamaliev 69'	Stadium: Philip II Arena^{2} Attendance: 860; Referee: Andriy Shandor (Ukraine)

15 July 2010 2nd qualifying round 1st leg	Portadown (Northern Ireland)	1 – 2	(Azerbaijan) Qarabağ	Portadown, Northern Ireland
22:45 AZST (UTC+5)	Lecky 29'	Report	Ismayilov 67', 86'	Stadium: Shamrock Park; Attendance: 765; Referee: Oliver Drachta (Austria)

22 July 2010 2nd qualifying round 2nd leg	Qarabağ (Azerbaijan)	1 – 1 (3 – 2 agg.)	(Northern Ireland) Portadown	Baku, Azerbaijan
21:00 AZST (UTC+5)	Ismayilov 83'	Report	Braniff 71'	Stadium: Tofiq Bahramov Stadium^{1} Attendance: 20,000; Referee: Tomasz Mikulski (Poland)

30 July 2010 3rd qualifying round 1st leg	Wisła Kraków (Poland)	0 – 1	(Azerbaijan) Qarabağ	Kraków, Poland
00:00 AZST (UTC+5)	Bunoza (yellow card) 51' (yellow-red card) 83'	Report	Nadirov 69'	Stadium: Suche Stawy; Attendance: 4,200; Referee: Tom Harald Hagen (Norway)

5 August 2010 3rd qualifying round 2nd leg	Qarabağ (Azerbaijan)	3 – 2 (4 – 2 agg.)	(Poland) Wisła Kraków	Baku, Azerbaijan
22:00 AZST (UTC+5)	Ismayilov 28'; Aliyev 33'; Sadyqov 35'	Report	Brożek 56'; Boguski 88'	Stadium: Tofiq Bahramov Stadium^{1} Attendance: 29,500; Referee: Bülent Yıldırım (Turkey)

20 August 2010 Play-off round 1st leg	Borussia Dortmund (Germany)	4 – 0	(Azerbaijan) Qarabağ	Dortmund, Germany
00:05 AZST (UTC+5)	Kagawa 13', 41'; Barrios 21', 29'	Report		Stadium: Westfalenstadion; Attendance: 47,800; Referee: Cristian Balaj (Romania)

26 August 2010 Play-off round 2nd leg	Qarabağ (Azerbaijan)	0 – 1 (0 – 5 agg.)	(Germany) Borussia Dortmund	Baku, Azerbaijan
21:00 AZST (UTC+5)		Report	Barrios 90+1'	Stadium: Tofiq Bahramov Stadium^{1} Attendance: 17,000; Referee: Serge Gumienny (Belgium)

== Squad statistics ==
As of match played 18 May 2011

=== Appearances and goals ===
No.	Pos	Nat	Player	Total		Premier League		Azerbaijan Cup		Europa League	
No.	Pos	Nat	Player	Apps	Goals	Apps	Goals	Apps	Goals	Apps	Goals
1	GK	(Azerbaijan) AZE	Farhad Valiyev	30	0	21	0	1	0	8	0
2	MF	(Azerbaijan) AZE	Gara Garayev	15	0	13	0	0	0	2	0
3	DF	(Azerbaijan) AZE	Aftandil Hajiyev	6	1	3+2	1	0	0	0+1	0
4	DF	(Azerbaijan) AZE	Zaur Hashimov	24	0	19	0	1	0	3+1	0
5	DF	(Azerbaijan) AZE	Maksim Medvedev	26	0	18	0	1	0	7	0
6	MF	(Azerbaijan) AZE	Rashad Sadiqov	41	5	29+3	4	1	0	8	1
7	MF	(Azerbaijan) AZE	Namiq Yusifov	31	0	23+4	0	1	0	1+2	0
8	MF	(Azerbaijan) AZE	Aslan Kerimov	12	0	1+5	0	0	0	1+5	0
9	MF	(Azerbaijan) AZE	Elvin Mammadov	35	1	19+10	1	1	0	3+2	0
10	MF	(Azerbaijan) AZE	Emin Imamaliev	16	4	8+1	2	1	0	3+3	2
11	FW	(Azerbaijan) AZE	Rauf Aliyev	38	11	25+6	10	1	0	6	1
12	GK	(Azerbaijan) AZE	Sahil Kerimov	3	0	2	0	0	0	0+1	0
13	DF	(Azerbaijan) AZE	Samir Abbasov	22	0	9+5	0	0	0	7+1	0
14	DF	(Azerbaijan) AZE	Rashad Sadygov	22	1	12+2	0	0	0	8	1
15	MF	(Azerbaijan) AZE	Aykhan Abbasov	1	0	1	0	0	0	0	0
16	MF	(Azerbaijan) AZE	Rashad Kerimov	10	0	7+3	0	0	0	0	0
17	FW	(Azerbaijan) AZE	Vügar Nadirov	37	2	18+12	1	0+1	0	1+5	1
18	DF	(Azerbaijan) AZE	Ilgar Gurbanov	3	1	1+2	1	0	0	0	0
19	MF	(Latvia) LAT	Andrejs Rubins	17	0	7+5	0	0+1	0	4	0
20	MF	(North Macedonia) MKD	Nderim Nedzipi	10	0	4+6	0	0	0	0	0
21	FW	(Azerbaijan) AZE	Murad Sattarli	1	0	0+1	0	0	0	0	0
22	MF	(Azerbaijan) AZE	Afran Ismayilov	18	6	9+3	1	0	0	6	5
23	FW	(Azerbaijan) AZE	Tural Isgandarov	6	0	1+5	0	0	0	0	0
24	DF	(Albania) ALB	Admir Teli	37	2	30	2	1	0	6	0
25	DF	(Albania) ALB	Ansi Agolli	38	0	31	0	1	0	6	0
72	MF	(Turkey) TUR	Devran Ayhan	15	0	9+5	0	0+1	0	0	0
77	FW	(Georgia (country)) GEO	Giorgi Adamia	40	19	23+8	18	1	0	8	1
99	GK	(Serbia) SRB	Bojan Pavlović	10	0	9+1	0	0	0	0	0
Players away on loan:
Players who left Qarabağ during the season:

=== Goal scorers ===
Place	Position	Nation	Number	Name	Premier League	Azerbaijan Cup	Europa League	Total
1	FW	(Georgia (country))	77	Giorgi Adamia	18	0	1	19
2	FW	(Azerbaijan)	11	Rauf Aliyev	10	0	1	10
3	MF	(Azerbaijan)	6	Rashad Sadiqov	4	0	2	6
3	MF	(Azerbaijan)	22	Afran Ismayilov	1	0	5	6
5	MF	(Azerbaijan)	10	Emin Imamaliev	2	0	2	4
6	DF	(Albania)	24	Admir Teli	2	0	0	2
6	FW	(Azerbaijan)	17	Vügar Nadirov	1	0	1	2
6	DF	(Azerbaijan)	14	Rashad Sadygov	0	0	2	2
9	DF	(Azerbaijan)	3	Aftandil Hajiyev	1	0	0	1
9	MF	(Azerbaijan)	9	Elvin Mammadov	1	0	0	1
9	MF	(Azerbaijan)	18	Ilgar Gurbanov	1	0	0	1
				TOTALS	41	0	12	53

=== Clean sheets ===
Place	Position	Nation	Number	Name	Premier League	Azerbaijan Cup	Europa League	Total
1	GK	(Azerbaijan)	1	Farhad Valiyev	10	1	1	12
2	GK	(Serbia)	99	Bojan Pavlović	6	0	0	6
3	GK	(Azerbaijan)	12	Sahil Kerimov	2	0	0	2
				TOTALS	18	1	1	20

=== Disciplinary record ===
Number	Nation	Position	Name	Premier League		Azerbaijan Cup		Europa League		Total	
Number	Nation	Position	Name	Yellow card	Red card	Yellow card	Red card	Yellow card	Red card	Yellow card	Red card
1	(Azerbaijan)	GK	Farhad Valiyev	1	0	0	0	0	0	1	0
2	(Azerbaijan)	DF	Gara Garayev	0	0	0	0	1	0	1	0
4	(Azerbaijan)	DF	Zaur Hashimov	2	0	0	0	0	0	2	0
5	(Azerbaijan)	DF	Maksim Medvedev	2	0	0	0	0	0	2	0
6	(Azerbaijan)	DF	Rashad Sadiqov	3	0	0	0	1	0	4	0
7	(Azerbaijan)	MF	Namiq Yusifov	2	0	0	0	0	0	2	0
8	(Azerbaijan)	MF	Aslan Kerimov	1	0	0	0	0	0	1	0
9	(Azerbaijan)	MF	Elvin Mammadov	2	0	0	0	1	0	3	0
11	(Azerbaijan)	FW	Rauf Aliyev	2	0	0	0	0	0	2	0
14	(Azerbaijan)	MF	Rashad Sadygov	2	0	0	0	0	0	2	0
17	(Azerbaijan)	FW	Vügar Nadirov	3	0	1	0	1	0	5	0
19	(Latvia)	MF	Andrejs Rubins	1	0	0	0	0	0	1	0
22	(Azerbaijan)	MF	Afran Ismayilov	2	0	0	0	0	0	2	0
24	(Albania)	DF	Admir Teli	2	0	0	0	1	1	3	1
25	(Georgia (country))	FW	Giorgi Adamia	2	0	0	0	0	0	2	0
72	(Turkey)	MF	Devran Ayhan	4	0	0	0	0	0	4	0
77	(Georgia (country))	FW	Giorgi Adamia	0	0	0	0	1	0	1	0
Plays away on loan:
Players who left Qarabağ during the season:
			TOTALS	32	0	1	0	6	1	39	1
