= 2012–13 FK Qarabağ season =

Qarabağ
2012–13 season
- Chairman: Tahir Gözal
- Manager: Gurban Gurbanov
- Stadium: Tofiq Bahramov Stadium^{1}
- Premier League: 2nd
- Azerbaijan Cup: Semifinals vs Neftchi Baku
- Top goalscorer: League: Richard (13); All: Richard (14)
- Highest home attendance: 3,000 vs Neftchi Baku; 4 May 2013
- Lowest home attendance: 150 vs FK Baku; 20 October 2012
- Average home league attendance: 768
Home colours	Away colours

The Qarabağ 2012–13 season was Qarabağ's 20th Azerbaijan Premier League season, and their fifth season under Gurban Gurbanov. Qarabağ also competed in the 2012–13 Azerbaijan Cup where they reached the Semifinals.

== Squad ==
As of 3 March 2013

Note: Flags indicate national team as defined under FIFA eligibility rules; some limited exceptions apply. Players may hold more than one non-FIFA nationality.

No.	Pos.	Nation	Player
1	GK	AZE	Farhad Veliyev
2	DF	AZE	Gara Garayev
3	DF	AZE	Kamil Huseynov
4	DF	AZE	Zaur Hashimov
5	DF	AZE	Maksim Medvedev
6	DF	AZE	Haji Ahmadov
7	MF	AZE	Namiq Yusifov
9	FW	AZE	Tural Isgandarov
10	MF	MKD	Muarem Muarem
11	FW	AZE	Branimir Subašić
12	GK	AZE	Osman Umarov
14	DF	AZE	Rashad Sadygov (captain)
15	FW	NGR	Emeka Opara
16	FW	AZE	Elnur Abdulov
17	FW	AZE	Vüqar Nadirov

No.	Pos.	Nation	Player
18	MF	AZE	Ilgar Gurbanov
20	MF	BRA	Richard
21	MF	BRA	Reynaldo
22	MF	AZE	Afran Ismayilov
24	DF	ALB	Admir Teli
25	DF	ALB	Ansi Agolli
27	DF	AZE	Elvin Musazade
32	MF	AZE	Toghrul Bilalli
33	MF	AZE	Tamkin Khalilzade
44	DF	AZE	Eltun Yagublu
55	DF	AZE	Badavi Guseynov
70	FW	AZE	Vagif Javadov
88	MF	ARG	Cristian Torres
89	GK	CRO	Miro Varvodić

=== Out on loan ===
Note: Flags indicate national team as defined under FIFA eligibility rules; some limited exceptions apply. Players may hold more than one non-FIFA nationality.

No. / Pos. / Nation / Player; — / FW / AZE / Bakhtiyar Soltanov (at Simurq)	No. / Pos. / Nation / Player; — / FW / AZE / Murad Sattarli (at Simurq)

== Transfers ==
=== Summer ===
In: Note: Flags indicate national team as defined under FIFA eligibility rules; some limited exceptions apply. Players may hold more than one non-FIFA nationality.

No.	Pos.	Nation	Player
6	DF	AZE	Haji Ahmadov (from (Azerbaijan) Baku)
16	FW	AZE	Elnur Abdulov (from (Azerbaijan) Inter Baku)
20	MF	BRA	Richard (from (Brazil) Santo André)
33	FW	EGY	Mostafa Afroto (from (Egypt) Al Ahly)
55	DF	AZE	Badavi Guseynov (from (Russia) Anzhi Makhachkala)
89	GK	CRO	Miro Varvodić (from (Germany) 1. FC Köln)

Out: Note: Flags indicate national team as defined under FIFA eligibility rules; some limited exceptions apply. Players may hold more than one non-FIFA nationality.

No.	Pos.	Nation	Player
6	MF	AZE	Rashad Sadigov (to (Azerbaijan) Neftchi Baku)
9	FW	AZE	Bakhtiyar Soltanov (loan to (Azerbaijan) Kapaz)
13	MF	AZE	Emin Imamaliev (loan to (Azerbaijan) Kapaz)
20	FW	MKD	Nderim Nedzipi (to (North Macedonia) Shkëndija)
21	FW	AZE	Murad Sattarli (loan to (Azerbaijan) Simurq)
77	FW	GEO	Giorgi Adamia (to (Azerbaijan) Inter Baku)
90	GK	SRB	Bojan Pavlović (to (Israel) Hapoel Ashkelon)

=== Winter ===
In: Note: Flags indicate national team as defined under FIFA eligibility rules; some limited exceptions apply. Players may hold more than one non-FIFA nationality.

No.	Pos.	Nation	Player
11	FW	AZE	Branimir Subašić (from (Azerbaijan) Khazar Lankaran)
15	FW	NGR	Emeka Opara (from (Kuwait) Al Naser)
21	MF	BRA	Reynaldo (from (Belgium) Anderlecht)
27	DF	AZE	Elvin Musazada (from (Azerbaijan) Ravan Baku)
88	MF	ARG	Cristian Torres (from (Azerbaijan) Ravan Baku)
—	MF	AZE	Emin Imamaliev (Loan return from (Azerbaijan) Kəpəz)
—	FW	AZE	Bakhtiyar Soltanov (loan return from (Azerbaijan) Kəpəz)

Out: Note: Flags indicate national team as defined under FIFA eligibility rules; some limited exceptions apply. Players may hold more than one non-FIFA nationality.

No.	Pos.	Nation	Player
11	FW	AZE	Rauf Aliyev (to (Azerbaijan) Baku)
33	FW	EGY	Mostafa Afroto (to (Egypt) Misr El Makasa)
88	MF	AZE	Emin Mustafayev (to (Azerbaijan) Ravan Baku)
—	FW	AZE	Bakhtiyar Soltanov (Loan to (Azerbaijan) Simurq)

== Competitions ==
=== Friendlies ===
19 January 2013	Qarabağ (Azerbaijan)	3–2	(Russia) Ural	Antalya, Turkey
19:00 AZT (UTC+4)	Garayev 28'; T.Bilalli 50'; E.Musazada 68'	Summary	Goal

=== Azerbaijan Premier League ===
==== Results summary ====
Overall								Home						Away					
Pld	W	D	L	GF	GA	GD	Pts	W	D	L	GF	GA	GD	W	D	L	GF	GA	GD
22	10	9	3	30	19	+11	39	6	4	1	16	6	+10	4	5	2	14	13	+1

Last updated: 3 March 2013.
Source: Soccerway

==== Results by round ====
Round	1	2	3	4	5	6	7	8	9	10	11	12	13	14	15	16	17	18	19	20	21	22
Ground	A	H	A	H	A	A	A	A	H	A	H	A	H	H	A	H	A	H	A	H	A	H
Result	D	W	W	D	L	W	D	D	D	L	L	W	W	D	W	W	D	W	D	W	W	D
Position	6	5	1	1	3	3	3	2	2	3	5	3	2	4	3	2	3	3	4	3	3	3

Source: Soccerway
A = Away; H = Home; W = Win; D = Draw; L = Loss

==== Results ====
3 August 2012 1	Inter Baku	1–1	Qarabağ	Baku
AZST (UTC+5)	Teli 89' (o.g.)	Summary	Muarem 37'	Stadium: Shafa Stadium; Attendance: 1,000; Referee: Fariz Yusifov

11 August 2012 2	Qarabağ	1–0	Neftchi Baku	Baku^{1}
20:00 AZST (UTC+5)	Garayev 41'	Summary		Stadium: Dalga Arena; Attendance: 800; Referee: Aliyar Agayev

19 August 2012 3	Sumgayit	1–6	Qarabağ	Sumqayit
18:00 AZST (UTC+5)	Hajiyev (red card) 20'; Allahquliyev 74'	Summary	Richard 14'; Sadygov 21' (pen.); Garayev (yellow card) 39' (yellow-red card) 44'; Nadirov 60'; Muarem 64'; Gurbanov 81'; Yusifov 90+1'	Stadium: Mehdi Huseynzade Stadium; Attendance: 8,000

24 August 2012 4	Qarabağ	0–0	Ravan Baku	Baku^{1}
20:00 AZST (UTC+5)		Summary		Stadium: Tofiq Bahramov Stadium; Attendance: 350; Referee: Rauf Jabbarov

16 September 2012 5	AZAL	6–2	Qarabağ	Baku
18:30 AZST (UTC+5)	Arsenijević 13'; Nildo 19', 49', 59', 77'; Benouahi 43' (pen.)	Summary	Richard 81', 87'	Stadium: AZAL Stadium; Attendance: 2,000; Referee: Aliyar Agayev

23 September 2012 6	Turan Tovuz	0–1	Qarabağ	Tovuz
17:00 AZST (UTC+5)		Summary	Sadygov 85' (pen.)	Stadium: Tovuz City Stadium; Attendance: 2,000; Referee: Elchin Mämmädov

29 September 2012 7	Simurq	0–0	Qarabağ	Zaqatala
18:00 AZST (UTC+5)		Summary		Stadium: Zaqatala City Stadium; Attendance: 3,500; Referee: Aliyar Agayev

4 October 2012 8	Kəpəz	0–0	Qarabağ	Ganja
16:00 AZST (UTC+5)		Summary		Stadium: Ganja City Stadium; Attendance: 8,000; Referee: Elchin Mämmädov

20 October 2012 9	Qarabağ	1–1	Baku	Baku^{1}
16:00 AZST (UTC+5)	Richard 79' (pen.)	Summary	Rodríguez 23'	Stadium: Tofiq Bahramov Stadium; Attendance: 150; Referee: Aliyar Ağayev

27 October 2012 10	Khazar Lankaran	2–0	Qarabağ	Lankaran
16:00 AZST (UTC+5)	Sialmas 36', 62'	Summary	Medvedev (yellow card) 40' (yellow-red card) 52'	Stadium: Lankaran City Stadium; Attendance: 6,000; Referee: Fariz Yusifov

31 October 2012 11	Qarabağ	1–2	Gabala	Baku^{1}
16:00 AZT (UTC+4)	Muarem 59'	Summary	Abdullayev 32'; Dodô 34'	Stadium: Tofiq Bahramov Stadium; Attendance: 500; Referee: Vusal Aliyev

4 November 2012 12	Qarabağ	2–0	AZAL	Baku^{1}
15:00 AZT (UTC+4)	Muarem 59'; Javadov 65'	Summary		Stadium: Tofiq Bahramov Stadium; Attendance: 200; Referee: Aliyar Ağayev

18 November 2012 13	Qarabağ	2–1	Simurq	Baku^{1}
16:00 AZT (UTC+4)	Richard 23'; Süleymanov 35' (o.g.)	Summary	Božić 61' (pen.)	Stadium: Tofiq Bahramov Stadium; Attendance: 400; Referee: Vusal Aliyev

24 November 2012 14	Qarabağ	1–1	Turan Tovuz	Baku
14:00 AZT (UTC+4)	M.Rahimov 85' (o.g.)	Summary	Ballo 69'	Stadium: Tofig Bakhramov Stadium; Attendance: 300; Referee: Rahim Hasanov

2 December 2012 15	Neftchi Baku	0–1	Qarabağ	Baku
18:00 AZT (UTC+4)		Summary	Nadirov 12'	Stadium: Ismat Gayibov Stadium; Attendance: 3,000; Referee: Fariz Yusifov

7 December 2012 16	Qarabağ	3–1	Kəpəz	Baku^{1}
16:00AZT (UTC+4)	Richard 7'; Javadov 21'; Ismayilov 89'	Summary	Fomenko 90+2'	Stadium: Tofiq Bahramov Stadium; Attendance: 250; Referee: Rauf Jabbarov

15 December 2012 17	Baku	0–0	Qarabağ	Baku
14:00 AZT (UTC+4)		Summary	Garayev (red card) 90+1'	Stadium: Tofig Bakhramov Stadium; Attendance: 1,000; Referee: Anar Salmanov

20 December 2012 18	Qarabağ	1–0	Khazar Lankaran	Baku^{1}
16:00 AZT (UTC+4)	Nadirov 73'	Summary		Stadium: Tofiq Bahramov Stadium; Attendance: 700; Referee: Aliyar Ağayev

10 February 2013 19	Gabala	1–1	Qarabağ	Qabala
15:30 AZT (UTC+4)	Žinko 41'	Summary	Richard 54' (pen.)	Stadium: Gabala City Stadium; Attendance: 1,200; Referee: Vusal Aliyev

16 February 2013 20	Qarabağ	3–0	Sumgayit	Baku^{1}
16:00 AZT (UTC+4)	Javadov 29'; Teli 83'; Sadygov 87'	Summary		Stadium: Tofiq Bahramov Stadium; Attendance: 350; Referee: RamilDiniyev

22 February 2013 21	Ravan Baku	2–3	Qarabağ	Baku
15:00 AZT (UTC+4)	Varea 26'; Kalonas 59'; Adamović (yellow card) 29' (yellow-red card) 67'	Summary	Richard 6'; Agolli 19'; Teli 90+1'	Stadium: Dalga Arena; Attendance: 600; Referee: Elchin Mämmädov

3 March 2013 22	Qarabağ	0–0	Inter Baku	Baku^{1}
17:00 AZT (UTC+4)		Summary		Stadium: Tofiq Bahramov Stadium; Attendance: 500; Referee: Vusal Aliyev

==== League table ====
Pos	Team	Pld	W	D	L	GF	GA	GD	Pts	Qualification
1	Neftçi Baku	22	14	2	6	47	24	+23	44	Qualification for championship group
2	Inter Baku	22	11	8	3	24	12	+12	41	Qualification for championship group
3	Qarabağ	22	10	9	3	30	19	+11	39	Qualification for championship group
4	Simurq	22	9	9	4	25	15	+10	36	Qualification for championship group
5	Gabala	22	9	5	8	26	27	−1	32	Qualification for championship group

Source: Association of Football Federations of Azerbaijan and Soccerway.com
Rules for classification: 1) points; 2) goal difference; 3) number of goals scored.

=== Azerbaijan Premier League Championship Group ===
==== Results summary ====
Overall								Home						Away					
Pld	W	D	L	GF	GA	GD	Pts	W	D	L	GF	GA	GD	W	D	L	GF	GA	GD
10	6	2	2	13	7	+6	20	3	1	1	8	5	+3	3	1	1	5	2	+3

Last updated: 20 14 May 2013.
Source: Soccerway

==== Results by round ====
Round	1	2	3	4	5	6	7	8	9	10
Ground	A	H	A	H	A	A	H	A	H	H
Result	L	W	W	W	W	W	L	D	W	D
Position	4	3	3	2	2	2	2	2	2	2

Updated to match(es) played on 20 May 2013. Source: Soccerway
A = Away; H = Home; W = Win; D = Draw; L = Loss

==== Results ====
12 March 2013 23	Simurq	1–0	Qarabağ	Zaqatala
17:00 AZT (UTC+4)	R.Eyyubov 31'; R.Eyyubov (yellow card) 28' (yellow-red card) 31'	Summary		Stadium: Zaqatala City Stadium; Attendance: 2,500; Referee: Rahim Häsänov

30 March 2013 24	Qarabağ	1–0	Gabala	Baku^{1}
15:00 AZT (UTC+4)	Richard 39'	Summary		Stadium: Tofiq Bahramov Stadium; Attendance: 0 Referee: Fariz Yusifov

6 April 2013 25	Neftchi Baku	1–2	Qarabağ	Baku
17:00 AZST (UTC+5)	Mitreski (red card) 44'; Canales 87'	Summary	Richard 35' (pen.), 69'	Stadium: Bakcell Arena; Attendance: 2,500; Referee: Rahim Häsänov

13 April 2013 26	Qarabağ	3–2	Inter Baku	Baku^{1}
15:00 AZST (UTC+5)	Medvedev 26'; Nadirov 46'; Opara 79'	Summary	Fomenko 54'; F.Bayramov 57'	Stadium: Tofiq Bahramov Stadium; Attendance: 1,000; Referee: Aliyar Ağayev

21 April 2013 27	Baku	0–1	Qarabağ	Baku
16:00 AZST (UTC+5)		Summary	Richard 87' (pen.)	Stadium: Tofig Bakhramov Stadium; Attendance: 1,000; Referee: Ramil Diniyev

28 April 2013 28	Gabala	0–2	Qarabağ	Qabala
16:00 AZST (UTC+5)		Summary	Reynaldo 67', 76'	Stadium: Gabala City Stadium; Attendance: 1,000; Referee: Aliyar Ağayev

4 May 2013 29	Qarabağ	1–2	Neftchi Baku	Baku^{1}
19:00 AZST (UTC+5)	Richard 72' (pen.)	Summary	Canales 23', 84'	Stadium: Tofiq Bahramov Stadium; Attendance: 3,000; Referee: Fariz Yusifov

9 May 2013 30	Inter Baku	0–0	Qarabağ	Baku
19:00 AZST (UTC+5)		Summary		Stadium: Shafa Stadium; Attendance: 1,000; Referee: Aliyar Agayev

14 May 2013 31	Qarabağ	3–1	Baku	Baku^{1}
17:30 AZST (UTC+5)	Muarem 37'; Nadirov 58'; Ivanovs 73' (o.g.)	Summary	Mario 18'; R.Aliyev (red card) 84'	Stadium: Tofiq Bahramov Stadium; Attendance: 800; Referee: Vusal Aliyev

19 May 2013 32	Qarabağ	0–0	Simurq	Baku^{1}
18:00 AZST (UTC+5)		Summary		Stadium: Tofiq Bahramov Stadium; Attendance: 300; Referee: Rahim Häsänov

==== Table ====
Pos	Team	Pld	W	D	L	GF	GA	GD	Pts	Qualification
1	Neftçi Baku (C)	32	19	5	8	59	32	+27	62	Qualification for Champions League second qualifying round
2	Qarabağ	32	16	11	5	43	26	+17	59	Qualification for Europa League first qualifying round
3	Inter Baku	32	16	9	7	38	22	+16	57	Qualification for Europa League first qualifying round
4	Simurq	32	12	12	8	32	26	+6	48	
5	Baku	32	9	14	9	33	27	+6	41	

Source: Soccerway.com
Rules for classification: 1) points; 2) goal difference; 3) number of goals scored.
(C) Champions

=== Azerbaijan Cup ===
28 November 2012 Second Round	Kəpəz	0–2 (a.e.t.)	Qarabağ	Ganja
13:00 AZT (UTC+4)		Summary	B.Asani 100' (o.g.); Ismayilov 115'	Stadium: Ganja City Stadium; Attendance: 500; Referee: Aliyar Ağayev

27 February 2013 Quarterfinals 1st Leg	Gabala	1–1	Qarabağ	Qabala
15:00 AZT (UTC+4)	Dodô 33'	Summary	Nadirov 56'	Stadium: Gabala City Stadium; Attendance: 1,150; Referee: Aliyar Ağayev

7 March 2013 Quarterfinals 2nd Leg	Qarabağ	0–0 (a 1 – 1 agg.)	Gabala	Baku^{1}
18:00 AZT (UTC+4)		Summary		Stadium: Tofiq Bahramov Stadium; Attendance: 700; Referee: Fariz Yusifov

17 April 2013 Semifinals 1st Leg	Neftchi Baku	2–1	Qarabağ	Baku
19:30 AZST (UTC+5)	Abdullayev 63' (pen.); Nasimov 90+1'	Summary	Nadirov 55'	Stadium: Bakcell Arena; Attendance: 1,000; Referee: Anar Salmanov

24 April 2013 Semifinals 2nd Leg	Qarabağ	2–2 (3–4 agg.)	Neftchi Baku	Baku^{1}
21:00 AZST (UTC+5)	Richard 41' (pen.); Opara 86'	Summary	Yunuszade 42'; Canales 77'	Stadium: Tofiq Bahramov Stadium; Attendance: 3,820; Referee: Fariz Yusifov

== Squad statistics ==
As of 20 May 2013

=== Appearances and goals ===
No.	Pos	Nat	Player	Total		Premier League		Azerbaijan Cup	
No.	Pos	Nat	Player	Apps	Goals	Apps	Goals	Apps	Goals
1	GK	(Azerbaijan) AZE	Farhad Veliyev	19	0	17+0	0	2+0	0
2	DF	(Azerbaijan) AZE	Gara Garayev	32	1	27+1	1	3+1	0
3	DF	(Azerbaijan) AZE	Kamil Huseynov	1	0	0+1	0	0+0	0
5	DF	(Azerbaijan) AZE	Maksim Medvedev	27	1	23+1	1	3+0	0
6	DF	(Azerbaijan) AZE	Haji Ahmadov	11	0	4+4	0	2+1	0
7	MF	(Azerbaijan) AZE	Namiq Yusifov	34	1	24+6	1	4+0	0
9	FW	(Azerbaijan) AZE	Tural Isgandarov	3	0	0+3	0	0+0	0
10	MF	(North Macedonia) MKD	Muarem Muarem	33	5	23+6	5	3+1	0
11	FW	(Azerbaijan) AZE	Branimir Subašić	8	0	2+5	0	0+1	0
14	DF	(Azerbaijan) AZE	Rashad Sadygov	30	3	24+1	3	4+1	0
15	FW	(Nigeria) NGR	Emeka Opara	12	2	6+4	1	2+0	1
16	FW	(Azerbaijan) AZE	Elnur Abdulov	6	0	2+4	0	0+0	0
17	FW	(Azerbaijan) AZE	Vüqar Nadirov	33	7	19+9	5	5+0	2
18	MF	(Azerbaijan) AZE	Ilgar Gurbanov	25	1	14+8	1	2+1	0
20	MF	(Brazil) BRA	Richard	34	14	29+1	13	3+1	1
21	MF	(Brazil) BRA	Reynaldo	12	2	8+1	2	2+1	0
22	MF	(Azerbaijan) AZE	Afran Ismayilov	27	2	12+10	1	2+3	1
24	DF	(Albania) ALB	Admir Teli	32	2	28+0	2	4+0	0
25	DF	(Albania) ALB	Ansi Agolli	31	1	27+0	1	4+0	0
27	DF	(Azerbaijan) AZE	Elvin Musazade	1	0	1+0	0	0+0	0
44	DF	(Azerbaijan) AZE	Eltun Yagublu	1	0	1+0	0	0+0	0
55	DF	(Azerbaijan) AZE	Badavi Guseynov	21	0	11+6	0	3+1	0
70	FW	(Azerbaijan) AZE	Vagif Javadov	28	3	16+8	3	2+2	0
88	MF	(Argentina) ARG	Cristian Torres	8	0	6+0	0	1+1	0
89	GK	(Croatia) CRO	Miro Varvodić	18	0	15+0	0	3+0	0
	MF	(Azerbaijan) AZE	Toğrul Bilallı	2	0	2+0	0	0+0	0
Players who appeared for Qarabağ no longer at the club:
11	FW	(Azerbaijan) AZE	Rauf Aliyev	19	0	10+8	0	1+0	0
33	FW	(Egypt) EGY	Mostafa Afroto	4	0	0+4	0	0+0	0
88	MF	(Azerbaijan) AZE	Emin Mustafayev	1	0	0+1	0	0+0	0

=== Goal scorers ===
Place	Position	Nation	Number	Name	Premier League	Azerbaijan Cup	Total
1	MF	(Brazil)	20	Richard	13	1	14
2	FW	(Azerbaijan)	17	Vüqar Nadirov	5	2	7
3	MF	(North Macedonia)	10	Muarem Muarem	5	0	5
4				Own goal	3	1	4
5	DF	(Azerbaijan)	14	Rashad Sadygov	3	0	3
5	FW	(Azerbaijan)	70	Vagif Javadov	3	0	3
7	DF	(Albania)	24	Admir Teli	2	0	2
7	MF	(Brazil)	21	Reynaldo	2	0	2
7	MF	(Azerbaijan)	22	Afran Ismayilov	1	1	2
7	FW	(Nigeria)	15	Emeka Opara	1	1	2
11	DF	(Azerbaijan)	2	Gara Garayev	1	0	1
11	MF	(Azerbaijan)	18	Ilgar Gurbanov	1	0	1
11	MF	(Azerbaijan)	7	Namiq Yusifov	1	0	1
11	DF	(Albania)	25	Ansi Agolli	1	0	1
11	DF	(Azerbaijan)	5	Maksim Medvedev	1	0	1
				TOTALS	43	6	49

=== Disciplinary record ===
Number	Nation	Position	Name	Premier League		Azerbaijan Cup		Total	
Number	Nation	Position	Name	Yellow card	Red card	Yellow card	Red card	Yellow card	Red card
1	(Azerbaijan)	GK	Farhad Veliyev	1	0	0	0	1	0
2	(Azerbaijan)	DF	Gara Garayev	6	2	2	0	8	2
5	(Azerbaijan)	DF	Maksim Medvedev	3	1	0	0	3	1
6	(Azerbaijan)	DF	Haji Ahmadov	1	0	0	0	1	0
7	(Azerbaijan)	MF	Namiq Yusifov	1	0	1	0	2	0
10	(North Macedonia)	MF	Muarem Muarem	3	0	1	0	4	0
11	(Azerbaijan)	FW	Rauf Aliyev	4	0	0	0	4	0
14	(Azerbaijan)	DF	Rashad Sadygov	2	0	1	0	3	0
15	(Nigeria)	FW	Emeka Opara	0	0	1	0	1	0
16	(Azerbaijan)	FW	Elnur Abdulov	1	0	0	0	1	0
17	(Azerbaijan)	FW	Vüqar Nadirov	8	0	1	0	9	0
18	(Azerbaijan)	MF	Ilgar Gurbanov	2	0	0	0	2	0
20	(Brazil)	MF	Richard	3	0	0	0	3	0
22	(Azerbaijan)	MF	Afran Ismayilov	2	0	0	0	2	0
24	(Albania)	DF	Admir Teli	2	0	0	0	2	0
25	(Albania)	DF	Ansi Agolli	4	0	1	0	5	0
55	(Azerbaijan)	DF	Badavi Guseynov	2	0	1	0	3	0
88	(Argentina)	MF	Cristian Torres	1	0	0	0	1	0
	(Azerbaijan)	MF	Toğrul Bilallı	1	0	0	0	1	0
			TOTALS	47	3	9	0	56	3

== Team kit ==
These are the 2012–13 Qarabağ kits.

Supplier: Adidas
Sponsor(s): Azersun
