= 2011–12 FK Qarabağ season =

Qarabağ
2011–12 season
- Chairman: Tahir Gözal
- Manager: Gurban Gurbanov
- Stadium: Guzanli Olympic Complex Stadium
- Premier League: 4th
- Azerbaijan Cup: Semi-finals vs FK Baku
- Europa League: Third Qualifying Round vs Club Brugge
- Top goalscorer: League: Giorgi Adamia (7); All: Giorgi Adamia & Rauf Aliyev (8)
- Highest home attendance: 17,387 vs EB/Streymur; 21 July 2011^{1}
- Lowest home attendance: 300 vs Turan Tovuz; 30 September 2011
- Average home league attendance: 3,704
Home colours	Away colours

The Qarabağ 2011–12 season was Qarabağ's 19th Azerbaijan Premier League season, and their fourth season under Gurban Gurbanov. They finished the season in 4th place, and were knocked out of the 2011–12 Azerbaijan Cup at the Semi-final stage by FK Baku. They also participated in the 2011–12 UEFA Europa League, entering at the first qualifying round stage. They beat Banga Gargždai of Lithuania, before beating EB/Streymur of the Faroe Islands on away goals in the second qualifying round. They were knocked out of the Europa League in the third qualifying round against Club Brugge of Belgium, losing 4-2 on aggregate. Their kits were manufactured by Kappa and was sponsored by Azersun.

== Squad ==
As of 7 February 2012

Note: Flags indicate national team as defined under FIFA eligibility rules; some limited exceptions apply. Players may hold more than one non-FIFA nationality.

No.	Pos.	Nation	Player
1	GK	AZE	Farhad Veliyev
2	DF	AZE	Gara Garayev
4	DF	AZE	Zaur Hashimov
5	DF	AZE	Maksim Medvedev
6	MF	AZE	Rashad Sadigov (captain)
7	MF	AZE	Namiq Yusifov (vice captain)
9	FW	AZE	Bakhtiyar Soltanov
10	MF	AZE	Emin Imamaliev
11	FW	AZE	Rauf Aliyev
12	GK	AZE	Osman Umarov
14	DF	AZE	Rashad Sadygov
15	DF	AZE	Elgiz Karamli
16	DF	AZE	Kamil Huseynov

No.	Pos.	Nation	Player
17	FW	AZE	Vügar Nadirov
18	MF	AZE	Ilgar Gurbanov
19	MF	MKD	Muarem Muarem
20	MF	MKD	Nderim Nedzipi
22	MF	AZE	Afran Ismayilov
23	FW	AZE	Tural Isgandarov
24	DF	ALB	Admir Teli
25	DF	ALB	Ansi Agolli
44	DF	AZE	Eltun Yagublu
70	FW	AZE	Vagif Javadov
77	FW	GEO	Giorgi Adamia
99	GK	SRB	Bojan Pavlović

== Transfers ==
=== Summer ===
In: Note: Flags indicate national team as defined under FIFA eligibility rules; some limited exceptions apply. Players may hold more than one non-FIFA nationality.

No.	Pos.	Nation	Player
9	MF	AZE	Bakhtiyar Soltanov (from (Azerbaijan) FK Baku)
25	DF	ALB	Ansi Agolli (from (Ukraine) Kryvbas Kryvyi Rih, previously on loan)
88	MF	BRA	Leonardo Rocha (from (Azerbaijan) FK Baku)

Out: Note: Flags indicate national team as defined under FIFA eligibility rules; some limited exceptions apply. Players may hold more than one non-FIFA nationality.

No.	Pos.	Nation	Player
3	DF	AZE	Aftandil Hajiyev (to (Azerbaijan) Turan Tovuz)
8	MF	AZE	Aslan Kerimov (to (Azerbaijan) Sumgayit City)
9	MF	AZE	Elvin Mammadov (to (Azerbaijan) FK Baku)
13	DF	AZE	Samir Abbasov (to (Azerbaijan) Sumgayit City)
12	GK	AZE	Sahil Kerimov (to (Azerbaijan) Sumgayit City)
16	MF	AZE	Rashad Karimov (to (Azerbaijan) Sumgayit City)
31	MF	LAT	Andrejs Rubins (to (Azerbaijan) Simurq)
72	MF	TUR	Devran Ayhan
—	FW	AZE	Murad Sattarli (on loan to (Azerbaijan) Sumgayit City)
—	MF	AZE	Aykhan Abbasov (to (Azerbaijan) Turan Tovuz)

=== Winter ===
In: Note: Flags indicate national team as defined under FIFA eligibility rules; some limited exceptions apply. Players may hold more than one non-FIFA nationality.

No.	Pos.	Nation	Player
20	MF	MKD	Muarem Muarem (from (North Macedonia) FK Rabotnički)
44	DF	AZE	Eltun Yagublu (from (Azerbaijan) Neftchi Baku)
70	FW	AZE	Vagif Javadov (from (Russia) Volga Nizhny Novgorod)

Out: Note: Flags indicate national team as defined under FIFA eligibility rules; some limited exceptions apply. Players may hold more than one non-FIFA nationality.

No.	Pos.	Nation	Player
88	FW	BRA	Leonardo Rocha (to (Brazil) Treze)

== Competitions ==
=== Azerbaijan Premier League ===
==== Results summary ====
Overall								Home						Away					
Pld	W	D	L	GF	GA	GD	Pts	W	D	L	GF	GA	GD	W	D	L	GF	GA	GD
22	12	5	5	27	14	+13	41	7	0	4	14	8	+6	5	5	1	13	6	+7

Last updated: 13 August 2011.
Source: Soccerway

==== Results by round ====
Round	1	2	3	4	5	6	7	8	9	10	11	12	13	14	15	16	17	18	19	20	21	22
Ground	H	A	H	A	H	A	H	A	A	A	H	H	A	H	A	A	H	A	A	H	H	H
Result	W	W	L	D	L	W	W	D	W	L	W	L	D	L	W	D	W	D	W	W	W	W
Position																			4	4	4	4

Source: Soccerway
A = Away; H = Home; W = Win; D = Draw; L = Loss

==== Results ====
14 August 2011 1	Qarabağ	1 - 0	Inter	Guzanli Olympic Stadium
18:00 AZST (UTC+5)	Aliyev 52'	Summary		Attendance: 5,000; Referee: Elchin Mämmädov

21 August 2011 2	Kəpəz	1 - 2	Qarabağ	Ganja City Stadium
17:00 AZST (UTC+5)	Parkhachev 49'	Summary	Adamia 8'; Aliyev 13'	Attendance: 10,000; Referee: Anar Salmanov

27 August 2011 3	Qarabağ	0 - 1	Gabala	Guzanli Olympic Complex Stadium
17:30 AZST (UTC+5)	Sadiqov (yellow card) 76' (yellow-red card) 90+1'	Summary	Mendy 37'	Attendance: 2,000; Referee: Vusal Aliyev

11 September 2011 4	Sumgayit	0 - 0	Qarabağ	Mehdi Huseynzade Stadium
17:00 AZST (UTC+5)		Summary		Attendance: 5,000; Referee: Jeyhun Hashimov

17 September 2011 5	Qarabağ	0 - 1	Khazar Lankaran	Guzanli Olympic Stadium
16:00 AZST (UTC+5)		Summary	Piţ 12'; Allahverdiyev (yellow card) 44' (yellow-red card) 63'	Attendance: 2,000; Referee: Fariz Yusifov

24 September 2011 6	AZAL	1 - 3	Qarabağ	AZAL Stadium
18:00 AZST (UTC+5)	Boghiu 3'	Summary	Arsenijević 15' (o.g.); Adamia 21', 77'	Attendance: 1,100; Referee: Anar Salmanov

30 September 2011 7	Qarabağ	3 - 1	Turan	Guzanli Olympic Stadium
18:00 AZST (UTC+5)	Nadirov 23'; Agolli 53'; Sadygov 85'	Summary	Aliyev 52'	Attendance: 300; Referee: Elnur Muradov

16 October 2011 8	Ravan Baku	1 - 1	Qarabağ	Dalga Arena
17:00 AZST (UTC+5)	Zečević 90+3'	Summary	Rocha 75'	Attendance: 800; Referee: Aliyar Ağayev

21 October 2011 9	Simurq	0 - 1	Qarabağ	Zaqatala City Stadium
17:00 AZST (UTC+5)		Summary	Aliyev 61'	Attendance: 2,000; Referee: Elnur Muradov

25 October 2011 10	Neftchi	3 - 2	Qarabağ	Ismat Gayibov Stadium
15:00 AZST (UTC+5)	R Abdullayev 27'; Teli 67' (og.); Flavinho 72'		Ismayilov 4', 24'	Attendance: 2,000; Referee: Rovshan Ahmadov

28 October 2011 11	Qarabağ	2 - 1	Baku	Guzanli Olympic Stadium
15:00 AZST (UTC+5)	Teli 7'; Sadigov 48'	Summary	Verpakovskis 36'	Attendance: 2,000; Referee: Anar Salmanov

5 November 2011 12	Qarabağ	1 - 2	Sumgayit	Guzanli Olympic Stadium
14:00 AZT (UTC+4)	Rocha 90+1'	Summary	Nurahmadov 20'; Sattarly 72'	Attendance: 4,000; Referee: Rahim Hasanov

19 November 2011 13	Inter	0 - 0	Qarabağ	Shafa Stadium
18:00 AZT (UTC+4)		Summary		Attendance: 2,000; Referee: Elchin Mämmädov

26 November 2011 14	Qarabağ	1 - 2	Neftchi	Guzanli Olympic Complex Stadium
14:00 AZT (UTC+4)	Ismayilov 65'	Summary	Abishov 9'; Flavinho 88'	Attendance: 2000; Referee: Anar Salmanov

4 December 2011 15	Turan	0 - 1	Qarabağ	Tovuz City Stadium
14:00 AZT (UTC+4)	Abbasov (yellow card) 63' (yellow-red card) 70'	Summary	Soltanov 4'	Attendance: 1,500; Referee: Rauf Jabbarov

10 December 2011 16	Khazar Lankaran	0 - 0	Qarabağ	Lankaran City Stadium
16:00 AZT (UTC+4)		Summary		Referee: Elchin Mämmädov

14 December 2011 17	Qarabağ	2 - 0	Ravan Baku	Guzanli Olympic Stadium
14:00 AZT (UTC+4)	Ismayilov 72', 76' (pen.)	Summary		Attendance: 2,000; Referee: Fariz Yusifov

20 December 2011 18	Gabala	0 - 0	Qarabağ	Gabala City Stadium
14:00 AZT (UTC+4)		Summary		Attendance: 1,000; Referee: Elchin Mämmädov

15 February 2012 19	Baku	0 - 3	Qarabağ	Tofig Bahramov Stadium
14:00 AZT (UTC+4)		Summary	Ismayilov 28' (pen.); Sadigov 48'; Adamia 65'	Attendance: 400; Referee: Aliyar Ağayev

20 February 2012 20	Qarabağ	1 - 0	Kəpəz	Guzanli Olympic Stadium
14:00 AZT (UTC+4)	Adamia 27'	Summary	Ismayilov (yellow card) 73' (yellow-red card) 90+1'	Attendance: 2,000; Referee: Orkhan Mämmädov

3 March 2012 21	Qarabağ	1 - 0	AZAL	Guzanli Olympic Stadium
14:30 AZT (UTC+4)	Aliyev 80'	Summary		Attendance: 2,000; Referee: Rahim Hasanov

7 March 2012 22	Qarabağ	2 - 0	Simurq	Guzanli Olympic Stadium
14:30 AZT (UTC+4)	Sadygov 22'; Nadirov 53'	Summary		Attendance: 2,000; Referee: Aliyar Ağayev

==== League table ====
Pos	Team	Pld	W	D	L	GF	GA	GD	Pts	Qualification
2	Inter Baku	22	13	6	3	21	10	+11	45	Qualification for championship group
3	Khazar Lankaran	22	13	5	4	33	19	+14	44	Qualification for championship group
4	Qarabağ	22	12	5	5	27	14	+13	41	Qualification for championship group
5	Baku	22	10	5	7	27	22	+5	35	Qualification for championship group
6	Gabala	22	10	5	7	27	23	+4	35	Qualification for championship group

Source: Soccerway: Azerbaijan Premier League Table
Rules for classification: 1) points; 2) goal difference; 3) number of goals scored.

=== Azerbaijan Premier League Championship Group ===
==== Results ====
11 March 2012 23	Qarabağ	1 - 0	Khazar Lankaran	Guzanli Olympic Stadium
15:00 AZT (UTC+4)	Adamia 69'	Summary		Attendance: 3,000; Referee: Elchin Mämmädov

17 March 2012 24	Qarabağ	1 - 1	Gabala	Guzanli Olympic Complex Stadium
15:00 AZT (UTC+4)	Gurbanov 90'	Summary	Mendy 17'	Attendance: 2,000; Referee: Rauf Jabbarov

24 March 2012 25	Baku	1 - 2	Qarabağ	Tofig Bakhramov Stadium
14:30 AZT (UTC+4)	Hajiyev 71'	Summary	Medvedev 8'; Javadov 47'	Attendance: 1,200; Referee: Vusal Aliyev

1 April 2012 26	Qarabağ	0 - 0	Neftchi	Guzanli Olympic Complex Stadium
16:00 AZST (UTC+5)		Summary		Attendance: 3,500; Referee: Anar Salmanov

7 April 2012 27	Inter Baku	1 - 1	Qarabağ	Shafa Stadium
16:00 AZST (UTC+5)	Tskhadadze 90+1'	Summary	Medvedev 75'	Attendance: 2,000; Referee: Aliyar Ağayev

14 April 2012 28	Gabala	1 - 0	Qarabağ	Gabala City Stadium
16:00 AZST (UTC+5)	Kamanan 70'	Summary		Attendance: 1,500; Referee: Rahim Hasanov

22 April 2012 29	Qarabağ	2 - 4	Baku	Guzanli Olympic Complex Stadium
16:00 AZST (UTC+5)	Adamia 34'; Muarem 89'	Summary	Ivanovs 14'; Česnauskis 62'; Šolić 65'; Yusifov 75' (o.g.)	Attendance: 2,000; Referee: Aliyar Agayev

29 April 2012 30	Neftchi	2 - 1	Qarabağ	Ismat Gayibov Stadium
17:00 AZST (UTC+5)	Abdullayev 71'; Abishov 90+1' (pen.)	Summary	Javadov 67'; Medvedev (red card) 90'	Attendance: 2,500; Referee: Rahim Hasanov

5 May 2012 31	Qarabağ	1 - 0	Inter Baku	Guzanli Olympic Complex Stadium
17:30 AZST (UTC+5)	Levin 75' (o.g.)	Summary		Attendance: 2,000; Referee: Fariz Yusifov

11 May 2012 32	Khazar Lankaran	4 - 1	Qarabağ	Lankaran City Stadium
17:30 AZST (UTC+5)	Sadio 11'; Brenes 22'; Bonfim 32', 66'; Beqiri (yellow card) 36' (yellow-red card) 67'	Summary	Aliyev 67' (pen.)	Attendance: 13,500; Referee: Elchin Mämmädov

==== Table ====
Pos	Team	Pld	W	D	L	GF	GA	GD	Pts	Qualification or relegation
1	Neftçi Baku (C)	32	20	3	9	55	30	+25	63	Qualification for Champions League second qualifying round
2	Khazar Lankaran	32	17	8	7	44	28	+16	59	Qualification for Europa League first qualifying round (Note: Baku qualified for the first qualifiying round of the 2012–13 UEFA Europa League as winner of the 2011–12 Azerbaijan Cup.)
3	Inter Baku	32	16	8	8	29	21	+8	56	Qualification for Europa League first qualifying round
4	Qarabağ	32	15	8	9	37	28	+9	53	
5	Gabala	32	15	7	10	43	32	+11	52	
6	Baku	32	15	5	12	42	37	+5	50	Qualification for Europa League first qualifying round

Source: Soccerway.com
Rules for classification: 1) points; 2) goal difference; 3) number of goals scored.
(C) Champions

=== Azerbaijan Cup ===
30 November 2011 Last 16	Qarabağ	3 - 0	Sumgayit	Guzanli Olympic Complex Stadium
13:00 AZT (UTC+4)	Soltanov 19'; Ismayilov 24'; Rocha 40'	Summary		Attendance: 1,500; Referee: Elchin Mämmädov

14 March 2012 Quarter Finals 1st Leg	Gabala	2 - 2	Qarabağ	Gabala City Stadium
14:00 AZT (UTC+4)	Mendy 42'; Dodo 66'	Summary	Aliyev 46'; Muarem 90'	Attendance: 1,000; Referee: Fariz Yusifov

28 March 2012 Quarter Finals 2nd Leg	Qarabağ	0 - 0 ((a)2 - 2 agg.)	Gabala	Guzanli Olympic Complex Stadium
15:00 AZT (UTC+4)		Summary		Attendance: 3,000; Referee: Elchin Mämmädov

18 April 2012 Semi Final 1st Leg	Baku	0 - 1	Qarabağ	Tofig Bahramov Stadium
15:30 AZST (UTC+5)		Summary	Adamia 89'	Attendance: 2,000; Referee: Fariz Yusifov

25 April 2012 Semi Final 2nd Leg	Qarabağ	0 - 1 (a.e.t.) (1 - 1 agg.) (4 - 5 p)	Baku	Guzanli Olympic Complex Stadium
16:00 AZST (UTC+5)		Summary; Youtube	Horvat 39'	Attendance: 2,000; Referee: Elchin Mämmädov
	Penalties
	Javadov (penalty scored); R.A.Sadigov (penalty missed); Medvedev (penalty scored); Yusifov (penalty scored); R.F.Sadygov (penalty scored)		(penalty scored) Šolić; (penalty scored) Česnauskis; (penalty scored) Maharramov; (penalty scored) Horvat; (penalty scored) Kovačević

=== UEFA Europa League ===
==== Qualifying phase ====
30 June 2011 1st qualifying round 1st leg	Banga Gargždai (Lithuania)	0 – 4	(Azerbaijan) Qarabağ	Gargždai, Lithuania
20:30 AZST (UTC+5)		Report	Sadigov 16'; Nadirov 33', 70'; Soltanov 88'	Stadium: Gargždai Stadium; Attendance: 1,400; Referee: Thorvaldur Arnason (Iceland)

7 July 2011 1st qualifying round 2nd leg	Qarabağ (Azerbaijan)	3 – 0 (7 - 0 agg.)	(Lithuania) Banga Gargždai	Baku, Azerbaijan
20:00 AZST (UTC+5)	Teli 29'; Sadigov 35'; Agoli 77'	Report		Stadium: Tofiq Bahramov Stadium^{1} Attendance: 10,000; Referee: Yuriy Mozharovskyy (Ukraine)

14 July 2011 2nd qualifying round 1st leg	EB/Streymur (Faroe Islands)	1 – 1	(Azerbaijan) Qarabağ	Tórshavn, Faroe Islands
22:00 AZST (UTC+5)	A. Hansen 90+3'	Report	Aliyev 11'	Stadium: Gundadalur^{2} Attendance: 735; Referee: Mark Steven Whitby (Wales)

21 July 2011 2nd qualifying round 2nd leg	Qarabağ (Azerbaijan)	0 – 0 ((a)1 - 1 agg.)	(Faroe Islands) EB/Streymur	Baku, Azerbaijan
20:00 AZST (UTC+5)		Report		Stadium: Tofiq Bahramov Stadium^{1} Attendance: 17,387; Referee: Goran Spirkoski (Macedonia)

28 July 2011 3rd qualifying round 1st leg	Club Brugge (Belgium)	4 – 1	(Azerbaijan) Qarabağ	Jan Breydel Stadium, Bruges
22:30 AZST (UTC+5)	Vleminckx 9'; Vázquez 55'; Donk 71'; Dirar 83'	Report	Aliyev 62'	Attendance: 22,213; Referee: Arnold Hunter (Northern Ireland)

4 August 2011 3rd qualifying round 2nd leg	Qarabağ (Azerbaijan)	1 – 0 (2 - 4 agg.)	(Belgium) Club Brugge	Baku, Azerbaijan
20:00 AZST (UTC+5)	Soltanov 87'	Report		Stadium: Tofiq Bahramov Stadium^{1} Attendance: 9,800; Referee: Sascha Kever (Switzerland)

== Squad statistics ==
=== Appearances and goals ===
As of 14 May 2012

No.	Pos	Nat	Player	Total		Premier League		Azerbaijan Cup		Europa League	
No.	Pos	Nat	Player	Apps	Goals	Apps	Goals	Apps	Goals	Apps	Goals
1	GK	(Azerbaijan) AZE	Farhad Veliyev	5	0	4+0	0	0+0	0	1+0	0
2	DF	(Azerbaijan) AZE	Gara Garayev	27	0	17+4	0	2+0	0	2+2	0
4	DF	(Azerbaijan) AZE	Zaur Hashimov	14	0	8+3	0	1+1	0	0+1	0
5	DF	(Azerbaijan) AZE	Maksim Medvedev	36	2	24+1	2	5+0	0	6+0	0
6	MF	(Azerbaijan) AZE	Rashad Sadigov	34	5	22+2	3	5+0	0	5+0	2
7	MF	(Azerbaijan) AZE	Namiq Yusifov	42	0	30+1	0	5+0	0	6+0	0
9	FW	(Azerbaijan) AZE	Bakhtiyar Soltanov	34	5	9+17	2	3+1	1	0+4	2
10	MF	(Azerbaijan) AZE	Emin Imamaliev	3	0	1+1	0	0+0	0	0+1	0
11	FW	(Azerbaijan) AZE	Rauf Aliyev	38	8	18+11	5	3+1	1	5+0	2
14	DF	(Azerbaijan) AZE	Rashad Sadygov	37	3	25+2	3	3+1	0	6+0	0
17	FW	(Azerbaijan) AZE	Vügar Nadirov	31	4	14+8	2	2+2	0	5+0	2
18	MF	(Azerbaijan) AZE	Ilgar Gurbanov	27	1	11+11	1	1+1	0	1+2	0
19	MF	(North Macedonia) MKD	Muarem Muarem	17	2	11+3	1	2+1	1	0+0	0
20	MF	(North Macedonia) MKD	Nderim Nedzipi	12	0	2+5	0	0+1	0	1+3	0
22	MF	(Azerbaijan) AZE	Afran Ismayilov	35	7	23+3	6	4+0	1	5+0	0
23	FW	(Azerbaijan) AZE	Tural Isgandarov	7	0	1+4	0	0+1	0	0+1	0
24	DF	(Albania) ALB	Admir Teli	43	2	32+0	1	5+0	0	6+0	1
25	DF	(Albania) ALB	Ansi Agolli	41	2	29+2	1	4+0	0	6+0	1
44	DF	(Azerbaijan) AZE	Eltun Yagublu	1	0	1+0	0	0+0	0	0+0	0
70	FW	(Azerbaijan) AZE	Vagif Javadov	13	2	6+3	2	4+0	0	0+0	0
77	FW	(Georgia (country)) GEO	Giorgi Adamia	38	7	26+2	6	2+2	1	6+0	0
99	GK	(Serbia) SRB	Bojan Pavlović	38	0	28+0	0	5+0	0	5+0	0
Players who appeared for Qarabağ no longer at the club:
88	FW	(Brazil) BRA	Leonardo Rocha	15	3	11+3	2	1+0	1	0+0	0

=== Goal scorers ===
Place	Position	Nation	Number	Name	Premier League	Azerbaijan Cup	Europa League	Total
1	FW	(Georgia (country))	77	Giorgi Adamia	7	1	0	8
1	FW	(Azerbaijan)	11	Rauf Aliyev	5	1	2	8
3	MF	(Azerbaijan)	22	Afran Ismayilov	6	1	0	7
4	FW	(Azerbaijan)	9	Bakhtiyar Soltanov	2	1	2	5
4	DF	(Azerbaijan)	14	Rashad Sadiqov	3	0	2	5
6	FW	(Azerbaijan)	17	Vüqar Nadirov	2	0	2	4
7	FW	(Brazil)	88	Leonardo Rocha	2	1	0	3
8	DF	(Albania)	24	Admir Teli	1	0	1	2
8	DF	(Albania)	25	Ansi Agolli	1	0	1	2
8	DF	(Azerbaijan)	5	Maksim Medvedev	2	0	0	2
8	FW	(Azerbaijan)	70	Vagif Javadov	2	0	0	2
8	MF	(North Macedonia)	19	Muarem Muarem	1	1	0	2
8				Own goal	2	0	0	2
14	MF	(Azerbaijan)	18	Ilgar Gurbanov	1	0	0	1
				TOTALS	37	6	10	53

=== Disciplinary record ===
Number	Nation	Position	Name	Premier League		Azerbaijan Cup		Europa League		Total	
Number	Nation	Position	Name	Yellow card	Red card	Yellow card	Red card	Yellow card	Red card	Yellow card	Red card
1	(Azerbaijan)	GK	Farhad Veliyev	1	0	0	0	0	0	1	0
2	(Azerbaijan)	DF	Gara Garayev	3	0	1	0	0	0	4	0
5	(Azerbaijan)	DF	Maksim Medvedev	7	1	1	0	2	0	10	1
6	(Azerbaijan)	MF	Rashad Sadigov	4	1	0	0	0	0	4	1
7	(Azerbaijan)	MF	Namiq Yusifov	4	0	1	0	2	0	7	0
11	(Azerbaijan)	FW	Rauf Aliyev	4	0	0	0	0	0	4	0
14	(Azerbaijan)	DF	Rashad Sadygov	8	0	1	0	0	0	9	0
17	(Azerbaijan)	FW	Vügar Nadirov	4	0	0	0	1	0	5	0
18	(Azerbaijan)	MF	Ilgar Gurbanov	3	0	0	0	0	0	3	0
19	(North Macedonia)	MF	Muarem Muarem	1	0	1	0	0	0	2	0
20	(North Macedonia)	MF	Nderim Nedzipi	1	0	0	0	0	0	1	0
22	(Azerbaijan)	MF	Afran Ismayilov	2	0	0	0	0	0	2	0
24	(Albania)	DF	Admir Teli	3	0	0	0	1	0	3	0
25	(Albania)	DF	Ansi Agolli	3	0	0	0	1	0	4	0
70	(Azerbaijan)	FW	Vagif Javadov	1	0	0	0	0	0	1	0
77	(Georgia (country))	DF	Giorgi Adamia	6	1	2	0	0	0	8	1
88	(Brazil)	FW	Leonardo Rocha	4	0	0	0	0	0	4	0
99	(Serbia)	GK	Bojan Pavlović	2	0	0	0	0	0	2	0
			TOTALS	62	3	6	0	7	0	75	3

=== Monthly awards ===
Month	Azerbaijan Professional Football League Awards	
Month	Player	Award
February	(Azerbaijan) Afran Ismayilov	Won

=== Annual awards ===
Award	PFL Seasonal Awards	
Award	Player	Award
Best Forward	(Azerbaijan) Rauf Aliyev	Won

== Notes ==
- Note 1: Qarabağ played their home match at Tofiq Bahramov Stadium, Baku as their own Guzanli Olympic Complex Stadium did not meet the UEFA criteria.
- Note 2: EB/Streymur played their home match at Gundadalur, Tórshavn as their own Við Margáir did not meet the UEFA criteria.
