= Ilgar Gurbanov =

Azerbaijani footballer (born 1986)

Personal information
- Full name: Ilgar Bahram oglu Gurbanov
- Date of birth: 25 April 1986 (age 40)
- Place of birth: Baku, Soviet Azerbaijan, Soviet Union (now Azerbaijan)
- Height: 1.77 m (5 ft 10 in)
- Positions: Full-back; midfielder

Youth career
- 2000–2004: Fenerbahçe

Senior career*
Years	Team	Apps	(Gls)
2004–2007	Khazar Lankaran	56	(6)
2007–2009	Sivasspor	11	(1)
2008–2009	→ Boluspor (loan)	19	(3)
2009–2010	Olimpik Baku	23	(2)
2010–2011	Mersin İdmanyurdu	7	(0)
2011–2017	Qarabağ	109	(6)
2017–2019	Gabala	28	(0)
2019–2020	Sumgayit	4	(0)

International career
2001	Turkey U15	7	(0)
2002	Turkey U16	2	(0)
2002	Turkey U17	4	(0)
2004	Azerbaijan U19	3	(0)
2005–2006	Azerbaijan U21	4	(0)
2004–2018	Azerbaijan	30	(1)
- * Club domestic league appearances and goals

Ilgar Gurbanov (Azerbaijani: İlqar Qurbanov; born 25 April 1986) is an Azerbaijani former professional footballer who played as a full-back and midfielder.

== Club career ==
Gurbanov started his career with Fenerbahçe PAF in 2000. In 2006, he transferred to Khazar Lankaran in his native country. On 7 August 2007, he signed a three-year contract with Sivasspor with his contract set to expire on 30 May 2010. From 2010 Gurbanov played for the Turkish second division club Mersin İdmanyurdu.

On 31 May 2017, Gabala FK announced the signing of Gurbanov on a two-year contract.

On 20 August 2019, Gurbanov signed a one-year contract with Sumgayit FK.

== International career ==
When he was playing for Fenerbahçe PAF, he started to play for Turkey national youth teams. His debut for Turkey U15 against Greece was on 17 June 2001. He played 7 times for Turkey U15, 2 times for Turkey U16 and 4 times for Turkey U17 team.

He called for Azerbaijan and chose to play for them. On 28 April 2004 he debuted with Azerbaijan senior team against Kazakhstan. Gurbanov also holds a Turkish passport.

== Career statistics ==
=== Club ===
As of match played 19 May 2019

Appearances and goals by club, season and competition
Club	Season	League			National cup		Continental		Other		Total	
Club	Season	Division	Apps	Goals	Apps	Goals	Apps	Goals	Apps	Goals	Apps	Goals
Khazar Lankaran	2004–05	Azerbaijan Top League	15	2			–		–		15	2
Khazar Lankaran	2005–06	Azerbaijan Top League	21	1			2	0	–		21	4
Khazar Lankaran	2006–07	Azerbaijan Top League	20	3			–		–		20	3
Khazar Lankaran	Total		56	6			2	0	0	0	58	6
Sivasspor	2007–08	Süper Lig	11	1	1	0	–		–		12	1
Sivasspor	2008–09	Süper Lig	0	0	0	0	1	0	–		1	0
Sivasspor	Total		11	1	1	0	1	0	0	0	13	1
Boluspor (loan)	2008–09	TFF First League	19	3	0	0	–		–		19	3
Olimpik Baku	2009–10	Azerbaijan Premier League	23	2	3	1	–		–		26	3
Mersin İdmanyurdu	2010–11	TFF First League	7	0	1	1	–		–		8	1
Qarabağ	2010–11	Azerbaijan Premier League	3	1	0	0	0	0	–		3	1
Qarabağ	2011–12	Azerbaijan Premier League	22	1	2	0	3	0	–		27	4
Qarabağ	2012–13	Azerbaijan Premier League	22	1	3	0	–		–		25	4
Qarabağ	2013–14	Azerbaijan Premier League	15	0	1	0	0	0	–		16	0
Qarabağ	2014–15	Azerbaijan Premier League	12	2	4	0	7	0	–		23	2
Qarabağ	2015–16	Azerbaijan Premier League	18	0	4	0	6	0	–		28	0
Qarabağ	2016–17	Azerbaijan Premier League	16	1	3	0	2	0	–		21	1
Qarabağ	Total		108	6	17	0	18	0	0	0	143	6
Gabala	2017–18	Azerbaijan Premier League	11	0	5	0	4	1	–		20	1
Gabala	2018–19	Azerbaijan Premier League	17	0	1	0	2	0	–		20	0
Gabala	Total		28	0	6	0	6	1	0	0	40	1
Sumgayit	2019–20	Azerbaijan Premier League	2	0	1	0	–		–		3	0
Career total			254	18	29	2	27	1	0	0	310	21

=== International ===
Azerbaijan national team
Year	Apps	Goals
2004	9	1
2005	3	0
2006	7	0
2007	7	0
2008	3	0
Total	29	1

Statistics accurate as of match played 4 June 2008

Scores and results list Azerbaijan's goal tally first.

#	Date	Venue	Opponent	Score	Result	Competition
1	28 May 2004	Tofiq Bahramov Stadium, Baku, Azerbaijan	Uzbekistan	1–0	3–1	Friendly

== Honours ==
Khazar Lankaran

- Azerbaijan Premier League: 2006–07

Qarabağ

- Azerbaijan Premier League: 2013–14, 2014–15, 2015–16, 2016–17
- Azerbaijan Cup: 2014–15, 2015–16

Gabala

- Azerbaijan Cup: 2018–19
