= Namiq Yusifov =

Azerbaijani footballer (born 1986)

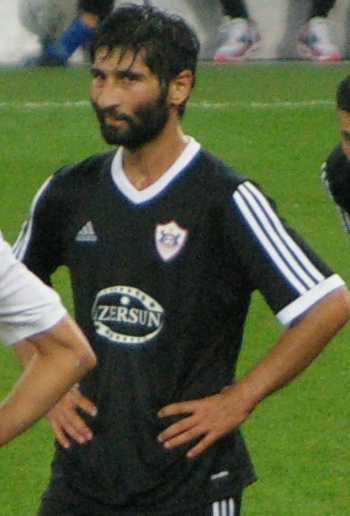

Personal information
- Full name: Namiq Asif oğlu Yusifov
- Date of birth: 14 August 1986 (age 40)
- Place of birth: Saint Petersburg, USSR
- Height: 1.72 m (5 ft 7 1/2 in)
- Position: Midfielder

Senior career*
Years	Team	Apps	(Gls)
2003–2004	Shafa Baku	25	(2)
2005	MKT Araz	13	(0)
2005–2007	Qarabağ	29	(0)
2007–2008	Neftçi Bakı	3	(0)
2008–2016	Qarabağ	185	(1)

International career
2006	Azerbaijan U21	1	(0)
- * Club domestic league appearances and goals as of 14 June 2016

Namiq Yusifov (born 14 August 1986) is an Azerbaijani professional footballer who played as a midfielder. He has played one match for Azerbaijan U21 against Belarus U21.

== Career statistics ==
=== Club ===
As of match played 15 May 2016

Appearances and goals by club, season and competition
Club	Season	League			National Cup		Continental		Other		Total	
Club	Season	Division	Apps	Goals	Apps	Goals	Apps	Goals	Apps	Goals	Apps	Goals
Shafa Baku	2003–04	Azerbaijan Premier League	12	0			-		-		12	0
Shafa Baku	2004–05	Azerbaijan Premier League	13	2			-		-		18	0
Shafa Baku	Total		25	2			-	-	-	-	25	2
MKT-Araz	2004–05	Azerbaijan Premier League	13	0			–		–		13	0
Qarabağ	2005–06	Azerbaijan Premier League	11	0			-		-		11	0
Qarabağ	2006–07	Azerbaijan Premier League	18	0			2	0	-		20	0
Qarabağ	Total		29	0			2	0	-	-	31	0
Neftçi Baku	2007–08	Azerbaijan Premier League	3	0			1	0	–		4	0
Qarabağ	2008–09	Azerbaijan Premier League	22	0			-		-		22	0
Qarabağ	2009–10	Azerbaijan Premier League	30	0			6	0	-		36	0
Qarabağ	2010–11	Azerbaijan Premier League	27	0	1	0	3	0	-		31	0
Qarabağ	2011–12	Azerbaijan Premier League	31	0	5	0	6	0	-		42	0
Qarabağ	2012–13	Azerbaijan Premier League	30	1	4	0	-		-		34	1
Qarabağ	2013–14	Azerbaijan Premier League	20	0	3	0	8	0	-		31	0
Qarabağ	2014–15	Azerbaijan Premier League	22	0	4	0	10	0	-		36	0
Qarabağ	2015–16	Azerbaijan Premier League	3	0	0	0	0	0	-		3	0
Qarabağ	Total		185	1	17	0	33	0	-	-	235	1
Career total			257	3	17	0	36	0	-	-	310	3
