= Qara Qarayev (footballer) =

Azerbaijani footballer (born 1992)

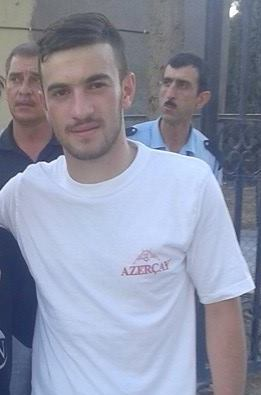
- Qarayev in 2014

Personal information
- Full name: Qara Elxan oğlu Qarayev
- Date of birth: 12 October 1992 (age 34)
- Place of birth: Horadiz, Füzuli, Azerbaijan
- Height: 1.69 m (5 ft 7 in)
- Position: Defensive midfielder

Senior career*
Years	Team	Apps	(Gls)
2008–2023	Qarabağ	308	(5)
2023–2024	Neftçi	25	(1)
2024–2025	Araz-Naxçıvan	30	(0)

International career^{‡}
- Azerbaijan U17
2009–2011	Azerbaijan U19	5	(0)
2011–2014	Azerbaijan U21	13	(0)
2013–	Azerbaijan	76	(0)
- * Club domestic league appearances and goals as of 30 December 2025 ‡ National team caps and goals as of 3 October 2024

Qara Elxan oğlu Qarayev (born 12 October 1992) is an Azerbaijani professional footballer who plays as a midfielder, most recently for Azerbaijan Premier League club Araz-Naxçıvan, and Azerbaijan national team. He has been twice selected as the footballer of the year in Azerbaijan in 2014 and 2020.

== Early years ==
Qara Qarayev was born on 12 October 1992 in Füzuli.

== Club career ==
On 22 May 2019, Qarayev signed a new two-year contract with Qarabağ.

Qarayev left Qarabağ on 24 July 2023, with Neftçi announcing his signing to a two-year contract with the option of an additional year the same day. On 19 September 2024, Neftçi announced the departure of Qarayev from the club by mutual agreement.

On 30 October 2024, Azerbaijan Premier League club Araz-Naxçıvan signed a contract with Qarayev until the end of the season.

On 25 December 2025, Araz announced that they had terminated their contract Qarayev by mutual agreement.

== Career statistics ==
=== Club ===
As of match played 2 December 2025

Appearances and goals by club, season and competition
Club	Season	League			National Cup		Continental		Total	
Club	Season	Division	Apps	Goals	Apps	Goals	Apps	Goals	Apps	Goals
Qarabağ	2008–09	Azerbaijan Premier League	1	0	0	0	—		1	0
Qarabağ	2009–10	Azerbaijan Premier League	1	0	0	0	0	0	1	0
Qarabağ	2010–11	Azerbaijan Premier League	13	0	0	0	2 (Note: Appearances in the UEFA Europa League)	0	15	0
Qarabağ	2011–12	Azerbaijan Premier League	21	0	3	0	4	0	27	0
Qarabağ	2012–13	Azerbaijan Premier League	28	1	4	0	-		32	1
Qarabağ	2013–14	Azerbaijan Premier League	32	0	3	0	8	0	43	0
Qarabağ	2014–15	Azerbaijan Premier League	31	0	5	0	12 (Note: Four appearances in the UEFA Champions League, and eight appearances in the UEFA Europa League.)	0	47	0
Qarabağ	2015–16	Azerbaijan Premier League	26	1	4	0	12 (Note: Four appearances in the UEFA Champions League, and eight appearances in the UEFA Europa League.)	0	42	1
Qarabağ	2016–17	Azerbaijan Premier League	20	0	5	0	11 (Note: Four appearances in the UEFA Champions League, and seven appearances in the UEFA Europa League.)	0	37	0
Qarabağ	2017–18	Azerbaijan Premier League	21	0	2	0	12 (Note: Appearances in the UEFA Champions League)	0	35	0
Qarabağ	2018–19	Azerbaijan Premier League	24	0	3	0	13 (Note: Five appearances in the UEFA Champions League, and eight appearances in the UEFA Europa League.)	0	40	0
Qarabağ	2019–20	Azerbaijan Premier League	16	1	2	0	11 (Note: Three appearances in the UEFA Champions League, and eight appearances in the UEFA Europa League.)	0	29	1
Qarabağ	2020–21	Azerbaijan Premier League	25	1	4	0	8 (Note: Two appearances in the UEFA Champions League, and six appearances in the UEFA Europa League.)	0	37	1
Qarabağ	2021–22	Azerbaijan Premier League	21	0	4	0	14 (Note: Appearances in the UEFA Europa Conference League)	0	12	0
Qarabağ	2022–23	Azerbaijan Premier League	28	0	2	0	12 (Note: Six appearances in the UEFA Champions League, five appearances in the UEFA Europa League and one appearance in the UEFA Europa Conference League.)	0	12	0
Qarabağ	2023–24	Azerbaijan Premier League	0	0	0	0	1	0	1	0
Qarabağ	Total		308	5	41	0	120	0	469	5
Neftçi	2023-24	Azerbaijan Premier League	25	1	3	0	-		28	1
Neftçi	2024-25	Azerbaijan Premier League	0	0	0	0	-		0	0
Neftçi	Total		25	1	3	0	0	0	28	1
Araz-Naxçıvan	2024-25	Azerbaijan Premier League	21	0	3	0	-		24	0
Araz-Naxçıvan	2025-26	Azerbaijan Premier League	9	0	1	0	3	0	12	0
Araz-Naxçıvan	Total		30	0	4	0	3	0	37	0
Career total			363	6	48	0	123	0	534	6

=== International ===
Statistics accurate as of match played 17 June 2022

Azerbaijan national team
Year	Apps	Goals
2013	6	0
2014	7	0
2015	8	0
2016	7	0
2017	7	0
2018	12	0
2019	9	0
2020	6	0
2021	10	0
2022	4	0
Total	76	0

== Honours ==
=== Club ===
Qarabağ FK

- Azerbaijan Premier League: (9) 2013–14, 2014–15, 2015–16, 2016–17, 2017–18, 2018–19, 2019–20, 2021–22, 2022–2023
- Azerbaijan Cup: (5) 2008–09, 2014–15, 2015–16, 2016–17, 2021–22

=== Individual ===
- Azerbaijani Footballer of the Year (2): 2014, 2020
