= Danilo Dias =

Brazilian footballer (born 1985)

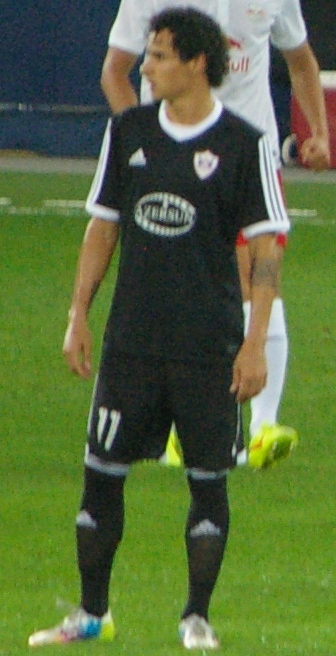

Personal information
- Full name: Danilo Leandro Dias
- Date of birth: 6 November 1985 (age 41)
- Place of birth: Ceres, Brazil
- Height: 1.74 m (5 ft 8 1/2 in)
- Position: Forward

Team information
- Current team: Mirandela

Youth career
- Goiás

Senior career*
Years	Team	Apps	(Gls)
2005–2008	Goiás	8	(0)
2006	→ Bandeirante (loan)		
2006	→ Gama (loan)		
2006	→ Atlético Goianiense (loan)		
2007	→ Goiânia (loan)		
2008	→ Noroeste (loan)		
2009–2010	Ipatinga	7	(2)
2010	→ Uberaba (loan)	12	(5)
2010–2014	Marítimo	104	(12)
2010–2014	Marítimo B	4	(3)
2014–2015	Qarabağ	6	(0)
2015–2016	União Madeira	29	(7)
2016	América-MG	3	(0)
2017–2018	União Madeira	11	(1)
2019	Cova Piedade	8	(0)
2019	Berço	3	(0)
2019–	Mirandela	12	(1)
- * Club domestic league appearances and goals as of 8 March 2020

Danilo Leandro Dias (born 6 November 1985) is a Brazilian professional footballer who plays for Portuguese club SC Mirandela as a forward.

== Club career ==
Born in Ceres, Goiás, Dias spent most of his career in his country in the lower leagues. His Série A input consisted of eight games for Goiás, in the 2005 season.

In June 2010, Dias moved abroad and joined a host of compatriots at C.S. Marítimo. He scored in only his third official appearance, contributing to an 8–2 home demolition of Bangor City for the third qualifying round of the UEFA Europa League, and added another goal until the end of the campaign in the Portuguese League Cup.

Danilo netted eight times while playing all 30 Primeira Liga games in 2011–12, helping the Madeirans finish fifth and once again qualify to the Europa League. On 30 May 2014 he moved to the Azerbaijan Premier League, signing a two-year contract with Qarabağ FK.

Danilo returned to both Portugal and the island of Madeira in August 2015, joining C.F. União.

== Club statistics ==
As of 25 May 2015

Club performance			League		Cup		League Cup		Continental		Total	
Season	Club	League	Apps	Goals	Apps	Goals	Apps	Goals	Apps	Goals	Apps	Goals
Portugal			League		Taça de Portugal		Taça da Liga		Europe		Total	
2010–11	Marítimo	Primeira Liga	21	0	1	0	2	1	6	2	30	3
2011–12	Marítimo	Primeira Liga	30	8	3	0	5	1	-		38	9
2012–13	Marítimo	Primeira Liga	29	3	2	0	2	0	10	1	43	4
2013–14	Marítimo	Primeira Liga	24	1	1	0	4	0	-		29	1
Azerbaijan			League		Azerbaijan Cup		Supercup		Europe		Total	
2014–15	Qarabağ	APL	6	0	3	0	0	0	7	2	16	2
Country	Portugal		104	12	7	0	13	2	17	4	141	18
Country	Azerbaijan		6	0	3	0	0	0	7	2	16	2
Total			110	12	10	0	13	2	24	6	157	20
