= Admir Teli =

Albanian footballer (born 1981)

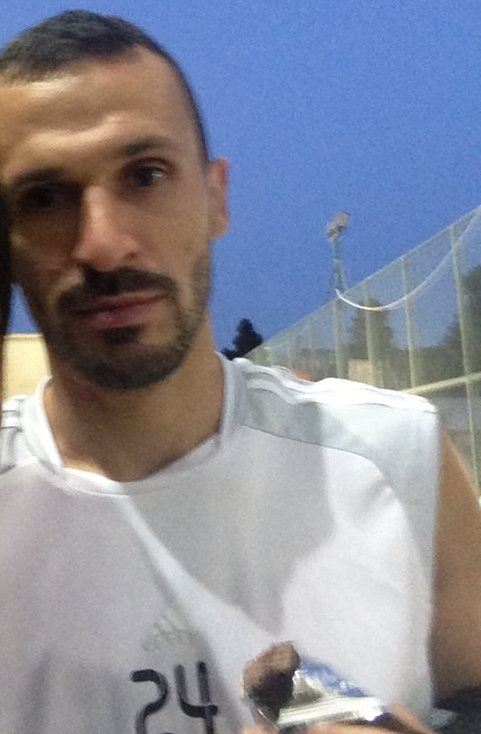
- Teli in 2014

Personal information
- Full name: Admir Teli
- Date of birth: 2 June 1981 (age 45)
- Place of birth: Shkodër, Albania
- Height: 1.85 m (6 ft 1 in)
- Position: Defender

Senior career*
Years	Team	Apps	(Gls)
2000–2008	Vllaznia	180	(6)
2008–2009	Hacettepe	16	(0)
2009–2015	Qarabağ	173	(8)
Total		369	(14)

International career^{‡}
2006–2013	Albania	19	(0)
- * Club domestic league appearances and goals as of 17 June 2015 ‡ National team caps and goals as of 11 September 2013

Admir Teli (born 2 June 1981) is an Albanian retired professional footballer who played as a defender. He spent most of his career in Albania and Azerbaijan, where he collected more than 400 appearances by representing Vllaznia Shkodër and Qarabağ, winning six major trophies in the process.

Teli began his senior international career in 2006 with Albania and went on earning 19 caps until 2013.

== Club career ==
Teli played for Elbasani in the 2005–06 Albanian Superliga season. After playing well for the club, he was given a surprise move to the biggest team in Albania, Tirana. However, he only ended up spending a few months at the club because he moved to Vllaznia Shkoder only two months later. He enjoyed a good spell there, notably winning the cup in the 2007–08 season.

In summer 2008, Teli along with two other players from Vllaznia Shkoder moved to Turkey after they had been spotted by the Turkish club Gençlerbirliği, along with Gilman Lika, Teli got a contract with the reserve team of Gençlerbirliği, Hacettepe Spor Kulübü, for whom he played in 16 Süper Lig matches. But the young Albanian striker Xhevahir Sukaj managed to get a contract with the parent team Gençlerbirliği.

In January 2009, he has signed a two-year contract with Azerbaijan Premier League team FK Qarabağ. Teli left Qarabağ at the end of the 2014–15 season.

== International career ==
Teli has been a former member of Albania national team whom he collected 19 caps.

== Career statistics ==
=== Club ===
Club performance			League		Cup		Continental		Total	
Season	Club	League	Apps	Goals	Apps	Goals	Apps	Goals	Apps	Goals
Albania			League		Albanian Cup		Europe		Total	
2000–01	Vllaznia Shkodër	Albanian Superliga	4	0			-		4	0
2001–02	Vllaznia Shkodër	Albanian Superliga	18	0			-		18	0
2002–03	Vllaznia Shkodër	Albanian Superliga	9	0			-		9	0
2003–04	Vllaznia Shkodër	Albanian Superliga	33	1			-		33	1
2004–05	Vllaznia Shkodër	Albanian Superliga	31	3			-		31	3
2005–06	Vllaznia Shkodër	Albanian Superliga	28	1			-		28	1
2006–07	Vllaznia Shkodër	Albanian Superliga	23	1			4	0	27	1
2007–08	Vllaznia Shkodër	Albanian Superliga	29	0			3	0	32	0
Turkey			League		Turkish Cup		Europe		Total	
2008–09	Hacettepe	Süper Lig	16	0	1	0	-		17	0
Azerbaijan			League		Azerbaijan Cup		Europe		Total	
2008–09	Qarabağ	APL	13	2			-		13	2
2009–10	Qarabağ	APL	30	1	2	1	6	0	38	2
2010–11	Qarabağ	APL	31	2	1	0	6	0	38	2
2011–12	Qarabağ	APL	32	1	5	0	6	1	43	2
2012–13	Qarabağ	APL	30	2	4	0	-		34	2
2013–14	Qarabağ	APL	19	0	2	0	8	0	29	0
2014–15	Qarabağ	APL	18	0	4	0	7	0	29	0
Career total			364	14	19	1	40	1	423	16

=== International ===
Appearances and goals by national team and year
National team	Year	Apps	Goals
Albania	2006	1	0
Albania	2007	0	0
Albania	2008	3	0
Albania	2009	1	0
Albania	2010	2	0
Albania	2011	8	0
Albania	2012	0	0
Albania	2013	4	0
Total		19	0

== Honours ==
Vllaznia Shkodër

- Albanian Superliga: 2000–01
- Albanian Cup: 2007–08
- Albanian Supercup: 2001

Qarabağ

- Azerbaijan Premier League: 2013–14, 2014–15
- Azerbaijan Cup: 2008–09
