= Farhad Valiyev =

Azerbaijani footballer (born 1980)

Fərhad Vəliyev
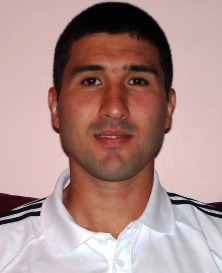

Personal information
- Full name: Farhad Mukhtar oglu Valiyev
- Date of birth: 1 November 1980 (age 45)
- Place of birth: Quba, Azerbaijan
- Height: 1.87 m (6 ft 2 in)
- Position: Goalkeeper
1998–2000	Kimyaçı Sumgayit	25	(0)
2000	Shahdag	4	(0)
2001	Masallı	4	(0)
2001–2002	Neftchi Baku	0	(0)
2003–2004	Neftchi Baku	1	(0)
2004–2005	Gänclärbirliyi Sumqayit	14	(0)
2005–2007	Inter Baku	41	(0)
2007–2016	Qarabağ	136	(0)
2016–2018	Sumgayit	51	(0)
2018–2019	Sabail	0	(0)

International career
Years	Team	Apps	(Gls)
1997	Azerbaijan U-18	7	(0)
2006–2010	Azerbaijan	32	(0)

Farhad Valiyev (Azerbaijani: Fərhad Vəliyev; born 1 November 1980) is a retired Azerbaijani football goalkeeper.

== Career ==
=== Club ===
On 3 June 2016, after 10-years with Qarabağ FK, Valiyev signed a one-year contract with Sumgayit FK.

Valiyev retired in the summer 2019.

=== International ===
Valiyev has made 32 appearances for the Azerbaijan national football team.

== Career statistics ==
=== Club ===
As of match played 29 April 2017

Club performance			League		Cup		Continental		Total	
Season	Club	League	Apps	Goals	Apps	Goals	Apps	Goals	Apps	Goals
1997–98	Azerbaijan U-18	APL	7	0			-		7	0
1997–98	Khazar Sumgayit	APL	1	0			-		1	0
1998–99	Khazar Sumgayit	APL	10	0			-		10	0
1999–2000	Khazar Sumgayit	APL	14	0			-		14	0
2000–01	Shahdag	APL	4	0			-		4	0
2000–01	Masallı	APL	4	0			-		4	0
2001–02	Neftchi Baku	APL	0	0			-		0	0
2002–03	no league championship was held		-		-		-		0	0
2003–04	Neftchi Baku	APL	1	0			-		1	0
2004–05	Gänclärbirliyi Sumqayit	APL	14	0			-		14	0
2005–06	Inter Baku	APL	19	0			-		19	0
2006–07	Inter Baku	APL	22	0			-		22	0
2007–08	Qarabağ	APL	24	0			-		24	0
2008–09	Qarabağ	APL	23	0			-		23	0
2009–10	Qarabağ	APL	29	0			6	0	35	0
2010–11	Qarabağ	APL	21	0	1	0	8	0	30	0
2011–12	Qarabağ	APL	4	0	0	0	1	0	5	0
2012–13	Qarabağ	APL	17	0	2	0	-		19	0
2013–14	Qarabağ	APL	12	0	0	0	0	0	12	0
2014–15	Qarabağ	APL	4	0	3	0	0	0	7	0
2015–16	Qarabağ	APL	2	0	1	0	0	0	3	0
2016–17	Sumgayit	APL	28	0	1	0	-		29	0
Total	Azerbaijan		260	0	8	0	15	0	283	0
Career total			260	0	8	0	15	0	283	0

=== International ===
Azerbaijan
Year	Apps	Goals
2006	8	0
2007	10	0
2008	6	0
2009	6	0
2010	2	0
Total	32	0

Statistics accurate as of match played 3 March 2010

== Honours ==
Neftchi Baku

- Azerbaijan Premier League (1): 2003–04
- Azerbaijan Cup (2): 2001–02, 2003–04

Qarabağ

- Azerbaijan Premier League (3): 2013–14, 2014–15, 2015–16
- Azerbaijan Cup (3): 2008–09, 2014–15, 2015–16
