= 2015–16 FK Qarabağ season =

Qarabağ
2015–16 season
- Chairman: Tahir Gözal
- Manager: Gurban Gurbanov
- Stadium: Tofiq Bahramov Stadium^{1}
- Premier League: 1st
- Azerbaijan Cup: Champions
- Champions League: 3rd qualifying round vs Celtic
- Europa League: Group Stage
- Top goalscorer: League: Dani Quintana (15); All: Dani Quintana (17)
Home colours	Away colours	Third colours

The Qarabağ 2015–16 season was Qarabağ's 23rd Azerbaijan Premier League season, of which they were defending champions, and was their eighth season under manager Gurban Gurbanov. They participated in the League, the Azerbaijan Cup, and the UEFA Champions League, entering at the Second qualifying round.

== Squad ==
As of 28 January 2016

Note: Flags indicate national team as defined under FIFA eligibility rules; some limited exceptions apply. Players may hold more than one non-FIFA nationality.

No.	Pos.	Nation	Player
1	GK	AZE	Farhad Valiyev
2	DF	AZE	Gara Garayev
4	DF	AZE	Eltun Yagublu
5	DF	AZE	Maksim Medvedev
7	MF	AZE	Namiq Yusifov
8	MF	ESP	Míchel
9	MF	BRA	Reynaldo
10	MF	ESP	Dani Quintana
12	GK	AZE	Agaseyid Gasimov
13	GK	BIH	Ibrahim Šehić
14	DF	AZE	Rashad Sadygov (captain)
15	MF	AZE	Rahid Amirguliyev
18	MF	AZE	Ilgar Gurbanov
19	DF	AZE	Azer Salahli
20	MF	BRA	Richard

No.	Pos.	Nation	Player
21	FW	AZE	Tural Rzayev
22	MF	AZE	Afran Ismayilov
23	DF	AZE	Elgun Ulukhanov
25	DF	ALB	Ansi Agolli
32	DF	AZE	Elvin Yunuszade
33	DF	AZE	Eltun Turabov
55	DF	AZE	Badavi Guseynov
63	GK	AZE	Shahrudin Mahammadaliyev
67	MF	MAR	Alharbi El Jadeyaoui
77	MF	AZE	Javid Tagiyev
90	FW	SWE	Samuel Armenteros
91	MF	AZE	Joshgun Diniyev
94	GK	TUR	Halit Citirki
97	FW	AZE	Mahir Madatov
99	MF	MKD	Muarem Muarem

=== Out on loan ===
Note: Flags indicate national team as defined under FIFA eligibility rules; some limited exceptions apply. Players may hold more than one non-FIFA nationality.

No.	Pos.	Nation	Player
6	MF	AZE	Vugar Mustafayev (at Zira)
99	MF	AZE	Namig Alasgarov (at Bursaspor)

== Transfers ==
=== Summer ===
In: Note: Flags indicate national team as defined under FIFA eligibility rules; some limited exceptions apply. Players may hold more than one non-FIFA nationality.

No.	Pos.	Nation	Player
4	DF	AZE	Eltun Yagublu (loan return from (Azerbaijan) AZAL)
6	MF	AZE	Vugar Mustafayev (from (Azerbaijan) Simurq)
8	MF	ESP	Míchel (from (Israel) Maccabi Haifa)
10	MF	ESP	Dani Quintana (from (Saudi Arabia) Al-Ahli)†
11	MF	AZE	Elvin Mammadov (from (Azerbaijan) Inter Baku)
19	DF	AZE	Azer Salahli (from (Azerbaijan) Inter Baku)
22	MF	AZE	Afran Ismayilov (from (Azerbaijan) Inter Baku)
23	DF	MKD	Vladimir Dimitrovski (from (Greece) Kerkyra)
29	FW	NED	Rydell Poepon (from (France) Valenciennes)
32	DF	AZE	Elvin Yunuszade (from (Azerbaijan) Neftchi Baku)
67	MF	MAR	Alharbi El Jadeyaoui (from (France) RC Lens)
91	MF	AZE	Joshgun Diniyev (from (Azerbaijan) Inter Baku)
90	FW	SWE	Samuel Armenteros (from (Belgium) Anderlecht)

Out: Note: Flags indicate national team as defined under FIFA eligibility rules; some limited exceptions apply. Players may hold more than one non-FIFA nationality.

No.	Pos.	Nation	Player
3	DF	AZE	Tarlan Guliyev (loan to (Azerbaijan) Kapaz)
4	DF	AZE	Bilal Abbaszade
6	DF	AZE	Haji Ahmadov (to (Azerbaijan) Zira)
10	MF	MKD	Muarem Muarem (to (Turkey) Eskişehirspor)
11	FW	BRA	Danilo Dias (to (Portugal) União da Madeira)
15	MF	AZE	Toghrul Bilalli
17	FW	AZE	Vüqar Nadirov (to (Azerbaijan) Khazar Lankaran)
22	MF	AZE	Toğrul Bilallı
23	FW	AZE	Tural Isgandarov
24	DF	ALB	Admir Teli
27	DF	AZE	Elvin Musazade
41	FW	NED	Leroy George (to (Turkey) Göztepe)
—	MF	AZE	Tamkin Khalilzade (to (Azerbaijan) Zira, previously on loan to (Azerbaijan) AZAL)

† Quintana's transfer was announced on 2 March 2015, but wasn't eligible to play until the summer transfer window.

=== Winter ===
In: Note: Flags indicate national team as defined under FIFA eligibility rules; some limited exceptions apply. Players may hold more than one non-FIFA nationality.

No.	Pos.	Nation	Player
4	DF	AZE	Eltun Yagublu (loan return from (Azerbaijan) Sumgayit)
15	MF	AZE	Rahid Amirguliyev (from (Azerbaijan) Khazar Lankaran)
23	DF	AZE	Elgun Ulukhanov (from (Russia) Krasnodar)
63	GK	AZE	Shahrudin Mahammadaliyev (from (Azerbaijan) Sumgayit)
99	MF	MKD	Muarem Muarem (from (Turkey) Eskişehirspor)

Out: Note: Flags indicate national team as defined under FIFA eligibility rules; some limited exceptions apply. Players may hold more than one non-FIFA nationality.

No.	Pos.	Nation	Player
4	DF	AZE	Eltun Yagublu (loan to (Azerbaijan) Sumgayit)
6	MF	AZE	Vugar Mustafayev (loan to (Azerbaijan) Zira)
11	MF	AZE	Elvin Mammadov (to (Azerbaijan) Zira)
23	DF	MKD	Vladimir Dimitrovski (to (Czech Republic) Teplice)
29	FW	NED	Rydell Poepon (to (Netherlands) Roda JC)
70	MF	BRA	Chumbinho (to (Greece) Atromitos)
99	MF	AZE	Namig Alasgarov (loan to (Azerbaijan) Kapaz)

== Friendlies ==
30 June 2015	Qarabağ (Azerbaijan)	3–4	(Austria) SV Horn	Austria
	Reynaldo 48', 68', 89'	Summary	Rakowitz 16' (pen.), 25'; Sakaki 38'; E.Dilić 52'

3 July 2015	Qarabağ (Azerbaijan)	2–3	(Romania) Steaua București	Austria
AZST (UTC+5)	Reynaldo 6'; N.Alasgarov 84'	Summary	Stanciu 2'; Tudorie 57'; Mihalcea 90'

7 July 2015	Qarabağ (Azerbaijan)	2–2	(Russia) Lokomotiv Moscow	Austria
AZST (UTC+5)	Reynaldo 45'; Mammadov 77'	Summary	Kasaev 36'; Tarasov 72'

16 January 2016	Qarabağ (Azerbaijan)	1-0	(Germany) Rot-Weiss Essen	Belek, Turkey
AZT (UTC+4)		Summary

20 January 2016	Qarabağ (Azerbaijan)	4-0	(Hungary) Diósgyőri	Belek, Turkey
AZT (UTC+4)	Medvedev 30'; Muarem 52'; Amirguliyev 58'; Madatov 73'	Summary

23 January 2016	Qarabağ (Azerbaijan)	3-4	(Austria) Admira Wacker	Belek, Turkey
AZT (UTC+4)		[ Summary]

23 January 2016	Qarabağ (Azerbaijan)	0-1	(Poland) Jagiellonia Białystok	Belek, Turkey
AZT (UTC+4)		[ Summary]

== Competitions ==
=== Azerbaijan Premier League ===
==== Results summary ====
Overall								Home						Away					
Pld	W	D	L	GF	GA	GD	Pts	W	D	L	GF	GA	GD	W	D	L	GF	GA	GD
36	26	6	4	63	18	+45	84	15	3	0	38	4	+34	11	3	4	25	14	+11

Last updated: 21 May 2016.
Source: Soccerway

==== Results ====
10 August 2015 1	Gabala	2 – 2	Qarabağ	Qabala
21:00 AZST (UTC+5)	Zenjov 32'; S.Zargarov (yellow card) 61' (goal) 87'; Sadiqov (red card) 73'	Report	Richard 62' (pen.), 83'; Gurbanov (yellow card) 75'	Stadium: Gabala City Stadium; Attendance: 3,200; Referee: Aliyar Ağayev

15 August 2015 2	Ravan Baku	1 – 2	Qarabağ	Baku
21:00 AZST (UTC+5)	Y.Ağakärimzadä (yellow card) 75'; T.Gurbatov 88'	Report	Yunuszade (yellow card) 27'; V.Mustafayev (yellow card) 38'; Diniyev (yellow card) 59'; Y.Ağakärimzadä 67' (o.g.); Garayev 83'	Stadium: Bayil Stadium; Attendance: 1,000; Referee: Ramil Diniyev

23 August 2015 3	AZAL	0 – 2	Qarabağ	Baku
21:00 AZST (UTC+5)	Malikov (yellow card) 22'; Jafarguliyev (yellow card) 27'; T.Hümbätov (yellow card) 57'	Report	V.Mustafayev (yellow card) 41'; M.Mahir 44'; Quintana 65'	Stadium: Dalga Arena; Attendance: 450; Referee: Elvin Äsgärov

12 September 2015 4	Qarabağ	1 – 0	Khazar Lankaran	Baku
20:30 AZST (UTC+5)	Yunuszade (yellow card) 49'; Mammadov (yellow card) 67'; Armenteros (yellow card) 71' (goal) 73'	Report	Amirguliyev (yellow card) 45'; I. Säfärzadä (yellow card) 80'	Stadium: Dalğa Arena; Attendance: 1,200; Referee: Ramil Diniyev

20 September 2015 5	Kapaz	2 – 3	Qarabağ	Ganja
16:30 AZST (UTC+5)	B.Soltanov 49'; S.Aliyev (yellow card) 73'; S.Rahimov 90+3'	Report	Yunuszade (yellow card) 18'; Diniyev 38' (pen.); Armenteros 50'; Mammadov 74' (pen.); Richard (yellow card) 77'	Stadium: Ganja City Stadium; Attendance: 20,000; Referee: Elvin Äsgärov

26 September 2015 6	Qarabağ	1 – 1	Neftchi Baku	Baku
19:00 AZST (UTC+5)	Quintana (yellow card) 70'; Diniyev (yellow card) 89'; Richard 90+1'	Report	Ramos (yellow card) 23' (goal) 61'; Qurbanov (yellow card) 42'; A.Mammadov (yellow card) 73'; S.Masimov (yellow card) 90'; Añete (yellow card) 90+1'	Stadium: Tofiq Bahramov Stadium^{1} Attendance: 4,000; Referee: Fariz Yusifov

4 October 2015 7	Inter Baku	0 – 2	Qarabağ	Baku
19:00 AZST (UTC+5)	Qirtimov (yellow card) 61'; Seyidov (yellow card) 72'; Lomaia (yellow card) 78' (red card) 90'; Khizanishvili (yellow card) 90' (red card) 90+3'	Report	Quintana 30'; Gurbanov (yellow card) 53'; Reynaldo 90+3'	Stadium: Inter Arena; Attendance: 1,800; Referee: Elvin Äsgärov

17 October 2015 8	Qarabağ	4 – 1	Zira	Baku
18:00 AZST (UTC+5)	Armenteros 5', 16' (yellow card) 11'; Richard 26', 83' (pen.)	Report	Ivanović 34'; V.Igbekoi (yellow card) 68'	Stadium: Tofiq Bahramov Stadium^{1} Attendance: 2,200; Referee: Ramil Diniyev

25 October 2015 9	Sumgayit	1 – 0	Qarabağ	Sumgayit
19:00 AZT (UTC+4)	Fardjad-Azad (yellow card) 39'; Mirzaga Huseynpur 85'; B.Hasanalizade (yellow card) 90+3'	Report	Chumbinho (yellow card) 45+1'	Stadium: Kapital Bank Arena; Attendance: 1,380; Referee: Ravan Hämzäzadä

28 October 2015 10	Qarabağ	1 – 0	Ravan Baku	Baku
19:00 AZT (UTC+4)	V.Mustafayev 36'	Report	Y.Ağakärimzadä (yellow card) 40'; N.Mammadov (yellow card) 77'	Stadium: Tofiq Bahramov Stadium^{1} Attendance: 350; Referee: Omar Paşayev

31 October 2015 11	Qarabağ	2 – 0	AZAL	Baku
19:00 AZT (UTC+4)	Yunuszade (yellow card) 23'; Ismayilov 49'; Poepon 90+3'	Report	A.Gasimov (yellow card) 61'	Stadium: Tofiq Bahramov Stadium^{1} Attendance: 830; Referee: İnqilab Mämmädov

8 November 2015 12	Khazar Lankaran	0 – 1	Qarabağ	Lankaran
16:00 AZT (UTC+4)		Report	Ismayilov 33'; Gurbanov (yellow card) 40'; Míchel (yellow card) 49'	Stadium: Lankaran City Stadium; Attendance: 4,700; Referee: Rauf Jabbarov

21 November 2015 13	Qarabağ	3 – 0	Kapaz	Baku
19:30 AZT (UTC+4)	Chumbinho 36'; Yunuszade (yellow card) 71'; Quintana 83'; Richard 87'	Report	B.Nasirov (yellow card) 8'; T.Akhundov (yellow card) 85'	Stadium: Tofiq Bahramov Stadium^{1} Attendance: 850; Referee: Orxan Mämmädov

29 November 2015 14	Neftchi Baku	1 – 0	Qarabağ	Baku
17:00 AZT (UTC+4)	Ailton (yellow card) 29'; R.Hajiyev 65' (yellow card) 65'; R.Mammadov (yellow card) 67'; K.Gurbanov (yellow card) 90+2'; Kurbanov (yellow card) 90+4'	Report	Medvedev (yellow card) 33'; Míchel (yellow card) 38'	Stadium: Bakcell Arena; Attendance: 6,500; Referee: Omar Paşayev

6 December 2015 15	Qarabağ	1 – 0	Inter Baku	Baku
18:30 AZT (UTC+4)	Quintana 34'; Diniyev (yellow card) 88'	Report	Martins (yellow card) 81'	Stadium: Tofiq Bahramov Stadium^{1} Attendance: 1,000; Referee: Aliyar Ağayev

13 December 2015 16	Zira	0 – 0	Qarabağ	Baku
18:00 AZT (UTC+4)	Tato (yellow card) 34'; T.Khalilzade (yellow card) 90'	Report	Poepon (yellow card) 12'	Stadium: Zira Olympic Sport Complex Stadium; Attendance: 1,150; Referee: Orkhan Mämmädov

16 December 2015 17	Qarabağ	2 – 2	Sumgayit	Baku
16:30 AZT (UTC+4)	Richard 57' (pen.); Poepon (yellow card) 86' (yellow-red card) 90+1'; Quintana 89'	Report	A.Yunanov 7'; M.Rahimov (yellow card) 53' (goal) 54'; E.Mehdiyev (yellow card) 83'	Stadium: Tofiq Bahramov Stadium^{1} Attendance: 500; Referee: Omar Paşayev

19 December 2015 18	Qarabağ	1 – 1	Gabala	Baku
18:00 AZT (UTC+4)	Richard (yellow card) 71'; Ismayilov 79'	Report	Zec 4'	Stadium: Tofiq Bahramov Stadium^{1} Attendance: 2,100; Referee: Aliyar Ağayev

31 January 2016 19	AZAL	1 – 0	Qarabağ	Baku
15:00 AZT (UTC+4)	Kvirtia 78'	Report	Richard (yellow card) 31'; Medvedev (yellow card) 35'; Guseynov (yellow card) 83'	Stadium: AZAL Arena; Attendance: 1,000; Referee: Rahim Hasanov

6 February 2016 20	Qarabağ	3 – 0	Khazar Lankaran	Baku
17:30 AZT (UTC+4)	Sadygov (yellow card) 26'; Quintana 71'; Richard 87'; Armenteros 90+2'	Report	T.Gurbatov (yellow card) 10'; R.Jafarov (yellow card) 29' (yellow-red card) 87'	Stadium: Tofiq Bahramov Stadium^{1} Attendance: 800; Referee: İnqilab Mämmädov

14 February 2016 21	Kapaz	1 – 2	Qarabağ	Ganja
15:00 AZT (UTC+4)	Alasgarov 44'; K.Diniyev (yellow card) 70'	Report	Sadygov 9'; Quintana (yellow card) 70'; Ismayilov 83'; Agolli (yellow card) 90+1'	Stadium: Ganja City Stadium; Attendance: 20,400; Referee: Omar Paşayev

20 February 2016 22	Qarabağ	2 – 0	Neftchi Baku	Baku
17:30 AZT (UTC+4)	Armenteros 8'; Richard (yellow card) 60'; Quintana 80'	Report	F.Muradbayli (yellow card) 22'; Ailton (yellow card) 26'; Ramos (yellow card) 35'; K.Gurbanov (yellow card) 60'	Stadium: Azersun Arena; Attendance: 3,000; Referee: Rauf Jabbarov

27 February 2016 23	Inter Baku	1 – 1	Qarabağ	Baku
18:00 AZT (UTC+4)	Hajiyev 42'; Meza (yellow card) 51'; Kvekveskiri (yellow card) 58'; Lomaia (yellow card) 59'; Aghayev (yellow card) 68'	Report	Diniyev (yellow card) 59'; Sadygov 87'	Stadium: Inter Arena; Attendance: 2,000; Referee: Omar Paşayev

5 March 2016 24	Qarabağ	2 – 0	Zira	Baku
18:00 AZT (UTC+4)	Muarem 4'; Míchel (yellow card) 9'; Madatov 90+3'	Report	T.Mutallimov (yellow card) 35'; Tato (yellow card) 88'	Stadium: Azersun Arena; Attendance: 2,200; Referee: Aliyar Ağayev

13 March 2016 25	Sumgayit	0 – 2	Qarabağ	Sumgayit
17:30 AZT (UTC+4)	Hüseynov (yellow card) 61'; K.Najafov (yellow card) 63'; Chertoganov (yellow card) 77'; S.Alkhasov (yellow card) 90+1'	Report	Quintana 13'; Míchel 17'; Garayev (yellow card) 80'; Muarem (yellow card) 85'	Stadium: Kapital Bank Arena; Attendance: 1,300; Referee: Ingilab Məmmədov

19 March 2016 26	Gabala	1 – 2	Qarabağ	Qabala
15:00 AZT (UTC+4)	Zenjov 17'; Zec (yellow card) 21'	Report	Míchel 9'; Yunuszade (yellow card) 35'; Madatov 72' (yellow card) 87'	Stadium: Gabala City Stadium; Attendance: 4,000; Referee: Aliyar Ağayev

30 March 2016 27	Qarabağ	5 – 1	Ravan Baku	Baku
17:30 AZT (UTC+4)	Míchel 16'; Muarem 53'; Richard 55'; Reynaldo 64' (yellow card) 66'; Quintana 90+1'	Report	M.Hashimli (yellow card) 39'; Khamid 68'; Y.Ağakarimzada (yellow card) 74'	Stadium: Azersun Arena; Attendance: 1,800; Referee: Orkhan Məmmədov

3 April 2016 28	Khazar Lankaran	1 – 2	Qarabağ	Lankaran
16:00 AZT (UTC+4)	T.Gurbatov 12'	Report	Madatov 6', 73'	Stadium: Lankaran City Stadium; Attendance: 2,000; Referee: Ramil Diniyev

8 April 2016 29	Qarabağ	4 – 0	Kapaz	Baku
17:30 AZT (UTC+4)	Reynaldo 17'; Míchel (yellow card) 32'; Quintana 43'; Sadygov (yellow card) 61'; Madatov 62'; Armenteros 90+3'	Report	B.Nasirov (yellow card) 40'	Stadium: Azersun Arena; Attendance: 3,153; Referee: Rəhim Həsənov

16 April 2016 30	Neftchi Baku	1 – 2	Qarabağ	Baku
16:00 AZT (UTC+4)	Qurbanov (yellow card) 23'; Ailton (yellow card) 46' (goal) 74'; A.Mammadov (yellow card) 56'; Ramos (yellow card) 67'; E.Badalov (yellow card) 70'; Jairo (yellow card) 76'	Report	Quintana (yellow card) 45' (goal) 56'; Richard (yellow card) 56'; Reynaldo 73'	Stadium: Bakcell Arena; Attendance: 6,500; Referee: Ramil Diniyev

22 April 2016 31	Qarabağ	2 – 0	Inter Baku	Baku
19:00 AZT (UTC+4)	Reynaldo 12'; Muarem 50'	Report	Lomaia (yellow card) 36'; F.Bayramov (yellow card) 44' (yellow-red card) 75'; S.Tashkin (yellow card) 63'; Aliyev (yellow card) 81'	Stadium: Azersun Arena; Attendance: 1,500; Referee: Ravan Həmzəzadə

1 May 2016 32	Zira	0 – 2	Qarabağ	Baku
19:00 AZT (UTC+4)	A.Naghiyev (yellow card) 43'; Bonilla (yellow card) 45'	Report	Garayev (yellow card) 19'; Quintana 28'; Reynaldo 74'	Stadium: Zira Olympic Sport Complex Stadium; Attendance: 2,000; Referee: Orxan Məmmədov

7 May 2016 33	Qarabağ	1 – 0	Sumgayit	Baku
19:00 AZT (UTC+4)	Ismayilov 41'; Guseynov (yellow card) 62'	Report		Stadium: Inter Arena; Attendance: 500; Referee: Rovan Rəcəbov

11 May 2016 34	Qarabağ	2 – 0	Gabala	Masazir
19:00 AZT (UTC+4)	Quintana 17', 32'	Report	Abbasov (yellow card) 66'; Stanković (yellow card) 76'; Zec (yellow card) 90+3'	Stadium: Alinja Arena; Attendance: 1,500; Referee: Rahim Həsənov

15 May 2016 35	Ravan Baku	2 – 1	Qarabağ	Baku
18:00 AZT (UTC+4)	Abbasov 27' (pen.); Yunisoğlu (yellow card) 45'; E.Abdulov 55'; H.Akhundov (yellow card) 86'; R.Azizli (yellow card) 89'; R.Tagizade (yellow card) 90+1'	Report	E.Yagublu (red card) 25'; Ismayilov 45+1' (pen.)	Stadium: Bayil Stadium; Attendance: 400; Referee: Elvin Asgərov

20 May 2016 36	Qarabağ	3 – 0	AZAL	Baku
19:00 AZT (UTC+4)	Madatov 21'; Míchel 30'; Quintana 41'; Sadygov (yellow card) 68'	Report	K.Huseynov (yellow card) 27'; Jafarguliyev (yellow card) 29'	Stadium: Azersun Arena; Attendance: 3,500; Referee: Omar Paşayev

==== League table ====
Pos	Team	Pld	W	D	L	GF	GA	GD	Pts	Qualification or relegation
1	Qarabağ (C)	36	26	6	4	66	21	+45	84	Qualification for the Champions League second qualifying round (Note: Qarabağ qualified for the Europa League first qualifying round by winning the 2015–16 Azerbaijan Cup. However, since they already qualified for European competition based on their league position, the spot awarded to the cup winners was passed down the league.)
2	Zira (Note: Zira would have qualified for the Europa League first qualifying round, but failed to obtain a UEFA licence as the club has existed professionally for less than three season.)	36	17	11	8	42	31	+11	62	
3	Gabala	36	16	11	9	44	28	+16	59 (Note: Gabala ahead of Inter Baku on head-to-head record: Inter Baku–Gabala 2–1, Gabala–Inter Baku 1–1, Inter Baku–Gabala 0–1, Gabala–Inter Baku 0–0.)	Qualification for the Europa League first qualifying round
4	Inter Baku (Note: On 31 March 2016, the Adjudicatory Chamber of the UEFA Club Financial Control Body (CFCB) announced that Inter Baku will be excluded from participating in the next UEFA club competition for which they would otherwise qualify in the next three seasons (i.e. the 2016/17, 2017/18 and 2018/19 seasons).)	36	16	11	9	39	28	+11	59	
5	Kapaz	36	15	11	10	48	40	+8	56	Qualification for the Europa League first qualifying round

Source: PFL, UEFA, Soccerway
Rules for classification: 1) Points; 2) Head-to-head points; 3) Head-to-head goal difference; 4) Head-to-head goals scored; 5) Head-to-head away goals scored (only if two teams); 6) Goal difference; 7) Goals scored.
(C) Champions

=== Azerbaijan Cup ===
2 December 2015 Second Round	Qarabağ	2 – 0	Shamkir	Baku
18:00 AZT (UTC+4)	Taghiyev 72'; Armenteros 83'	Summary	E.Şiriyev (yellow card) 74'	Stadium: Tofiq Bahramov Stadium^{1} Attendance: 500; Referee: Ravan Hämzäzadä

2 March 2016 Quarterfinal 1st leg	Qarabağ	2 – 0	Sumgayit	Baku
17:00 AZT (UTC+4)	Garayev (yellow card) 45'; Richard 52' (pen.); Madatov 86'	Summary	E.Mehdiyev (yellow card) 12'	Stadium: Azersun Arena; Attendance: 700; Referee: Orkhan Mammadov

9 March 2016 Quarterfinal 2nd leg	Sumgayit	1 – 4 (1 – 6 agg.)	Qarabağ	Sumqayit
15:00 AZT (UTC+4)	K.Najafov 63'; B.Hasanalizade (yellow card) 84'	Summary	Muarem 6', 50'; Armenteros 10', 58'; Quintana (yellow card) 65'	Stadium: Kapital Bank Arena; Attendance: 1,000; Referee: Omar Paşayev

27 April 2016 Semifinal 1st leg	Inter Baku	0 – 4	Qarabağ	Baku
16:00 AZT (UTC+4)	Seyidov (yellow card) 36'	Summary	Míchel 19', 61'; Quintana 67'; Reynaldo 85'	Stadium: Inter Arena; Attendance: 2,316; Referee: Rahim Həsənov

4 May 2016 Semifinal 2nd leg	Qarabağ	1 – 0 (5 – 0 agg.)	Inter Baku	Masazır
19:00 AZT (UTC+4)	Míchel 23'; Richard (yellow card) 79'; E.Yagublu (yellow card) 87'	Summary	Fomenko (yellow card) 64'	Stadium: Masazir Stadium; Attendance: 2,800; Referee: Ramil Diniyev

==== Final ====
25 May 2016	Qarabağ	1 – 0 (a.e.t.)	Neftchi Baku	Baku
20:00 AZT (UTC+4)	Quintana (yellow card) 92'; Míchel (yellow card) 117' (goal) 120'; Reynaldo (red card) 120+1'	Summary	Qurbanov (yellow card) 92'; Ramos (yellow card) 117' (red card) 120'; A.Mammadov (yellow card) 117'	Stadium: Tofiq Bahramov Stadium; Attendance: 23,000; Referee: Fariz Yusifov

=== UEFA Champions League ===
==== Qualifying phase ====
15 July 2015 2nd qualifying round 1st leg	Qarabağ (Azerbaijan)	0 – 0	(Montenegro) Rudar Pljevlja	Baku, Azerbaijan
21:30 AZST (UTC+5)	Garayev (yellow card) 43'	Report	R.Živković (yellow card) 48'; Ivanović (yellow card) 88'	Stadium: Tofiq Bahramov Stadium^{1} Attendance: 28,854; Referee: Sebastian Colțescu (Romania)

22 July 2015 2nd qualifying round 2nd leg	Rudar Pljevlja (Montenegro)	0 – 1 (0 – 1 agg.)	(Azerbaijan) Qarabağ	Petrovac, Montenegro
23:45 AZST (UTC+5)	Vlahović (yellow card) 44'; Knežević (yellow card) 54'; R.Živković (yellow card) 64'	Report	Reynaldo 57'	Stadium: Stadion pod Malim Brdom^{2} Attendance: 1,400; Referee: Georgi Kabakov (Bulgaria)

29 July 2015 3rd qualifying round 1st leg	Celtic (Scotland)	1 – 0	(Azerbaijan) Qarabağ	Glasgow, Scotland
23:45 AZST (UTC+5)	Izaguirre (yellow card) 36' van Dijk (yellow card) 44'; Boyata 82'; Forrest (yellow card) 90+2'	Report	Agolli (yellow card) 62'	Stadium: Celtic Park; Attendance: 43,011; Referee: Robert Schörgenhofer (Austria)

5 August 2015 3rd qualifying round 2nd leg	Qarabağ (Azerbaijan)	0 – 0 (0 – 1 agg.)	(Scotland) Celtic	Baku, Azerbaijan
21:30 AZST (UTC+5)		Report	Johansen (yellow card) 63'; Izaguirre (yellow card) 88'	Stadium: Tofiq Bahramov Stadium^{1} Attendance: 31,850; Referee: Martin Strömbergsson (Sweden)

=== UEFA Europa League ===
==== Qualifying phase ====
20 August 2015 Playoff round 1st leg	Young Boys (Switzerland)	0 – 1	(Azerbaijan) Qarabağ	Bern, Switzerland
23:00 AZST (UTC+5)	Bertone (yellow card) 70'	Report	Richard (yellow card) 58' (goal) 67'; Reynaldo (yellow card) 77'	Stadium: Stade de Suisse; Attendance: 6,700; Referee: Alon Yefet (Israel)

27 August 2015 Playoff round 2nd leg	Qarabağ (Azerbaijan)	3 – 0 (4 – 0 agg.)	(Switzerland) Young Boys	Baku, Azerbaijan
21:00 AZST (UTC+5)	Richard 4' (pen.) (yellow card) 51'; Reynaldo 43'; Ismayilov 61'	Report	von Bergen (red card) 4'; González (yellow card) 16'; Bertone (yellow card) 51'; Hadergjonaj (yellow card) 88'	Stadium: Tofiq Bahramov Stadium^{1} Attendance: 29,620; Referee: Gediminas Mažeika (Lithuania)

==== Group stage ====
Pos	Team	Pld	W	D	L	GF	GA	GD	Pts	Qualification
1	(England) Tottenham Hotspur	6	4	1	1	12	6	+6	13	Advance to knockout phase
2	(Belgium) Anderlecht	6	3	1	2	8	6	+2	10	Advance to knockout phase
3	(France) Monaco	6	1	3	2	5	9	−4	6	
4	(Azerbaijan) Qarabağ	6	1	1	4	4	8	−4	4	

Source: Soccerway
Rules for classification: Group stage tiebreakers

18 September 2015 1	Tottenham Hotspur (England)	3 – 1	(Azerbaijan) Qarabağ	London, England
00:05 AZST (UTC+5)	Son 28', 30'; Lamela 86'; Alli (yellow card) 87'	Report	Richard 7' (pen.); Medvedev (yellow card) 83'; Šehić (yellow card) 85'; Sadygov (yellow card) 87'; Míchel (yellow card) 87'	Stadium: White Hart Lane; Attendance: 26,463; Referee: Adrien Jaccottet (Switzerland)

1 October 2015 2	Qarabağ (Azerbaijan)	1 – 0	(Belgium) Anderlecht	Baku, Azerbaijan
22:00 AZST (UTC+5)	Richard 36'	Report	Defour (yellow card) 74'	Stadium: Tofiq Bahramov Stadium^{1} Attendance: 25,000; Referee: Oliver Drachta (Austria)

22 October 2015 3	AS Monaco (France)	1 – 0	(Azerbaijan) Qarabağ	Fontvieille, Monaco
22:00 AZST (UTC+5)	Wallace (yellow card) 40'; Carvalho (yellow card) 53'; L.Traoré 70'	Report	Agolli (yellow card) 76'	Stadium: Stade Louis II; Attendance: 6,165; Referee: Jakob Kehlet (Denmark)

5 November 2015 4	Qarabağ (Azerbaijan)	1 – 1	(France) AS Monaco	Baku, Azerbaijan
20:00 AZT (UTC+4)	Armenteros 39' (yellow card) 67'	Report	Fabinho (yellow card) 51'; Cavaleiro 72'; Silva (yellow card) 89'	Stadium: Tofiq Bahramov Stadium^{1} Attendance: 30,200; Referee: Cristian Balaj (Romania)

26 November 2015 5	Qarabağ (Azerbaijan)	0 – 1	(England) Tottenham Hotspur	Baku, Azerbaijan
22:00 AZST (UTC+5)	Richard (yellow card) 44'; Garayev (yellow card) 88'	Report	Kane 78'	Stadium: Tofiq Bahramov Stadium^{1} Attendance: 28,000; Referee: Anastasios Sidiropoulos (Greece)

11 December 2015 6	Anderlecht (Belgium)	2 – 1	(Azerbaijan) Qarabağ	Brussels, Belgium
00:05 AZT (UTC+4)	Najar 28'; Okaka 31'; Lukebakio (yellow card) 70'	Report	Armenteros (yellow card) 35'; Quintana 26' (yellow card) 48'; Richard (yellow card) 51'; Míchel (yellow card) 80'	Stadium: Constant Vanden Stock Stadium; Attendance: 16,075; Referee: Slavko Vinčić (Slovenia)

== Squad statistics ==
As of Match played 25 May 2016

=== Appearances and goals ===
No.	Pos	Nat	Player	Total		Premier League		Azerbaijan Cup		Champions League		Europa League	
No.	Pos	Nat	Player	Apps	Goals	Apps	Goals	Apps	Goals	Apps	Goals	Apps	Goals
1	GK	(Azerbaijan) AZE	Farhad Valiyev	4	0	2	0	2	0	0	0	0	0
2	DF	(Azerbaijan) AZE	Gara Garayev	42	1	15+11	1	4	0	4	0	8	0
4	DF	(Azerbaijan) AZE	Eltun Yagublu	5	0	3	0	2	0	0	0	0	0
5	DF	(Azerbaijan) AZE	Maksim Medvedev	38	0	26	0	4	0	2	0	6	0
7	MF	(Azerbaijan) AZE	Namiq Yusifov	3	0	2+1	0	0	0	0	0	0	0
8	MF	(Spain) ESP	Míchel	31	8	21+3	4	5	4	0	0	0+2	0
9	FW	(Brazil) BRA	Reynaldo	25	8	9+5	5	2+1	1	4	1	4	1
10	MF	(Spain) ESP	Dani Quintana	49	17	26+6	15	5	1	4	0	8	1
13	GK	(Bosnia and Herzegovina) BIH	Ibrahim Šehić	47	0	32	0	3	0	4	0	8	0
14	DF	(Azerbaijan) AZE	Rashad Sadygov	34	2	19	2	3	0	4	0	8	0
15	MF	(Azerbaijan) AZE	Rahid Amirguliyev	3	0	0+2	0	1	0	0	0	0	0
18	MF	(Azerbaijan) AZE	Ilgar Gurbanov	28	0	16+2	0	3+1	0	2+1	0	3	0
19	DF	(Azerbaijan) AZE	Azer Salahli	7	0	5+1	0	1	0	0	0	0	0
20	MF	(Brazil) BRA	Richard	49	14	26+5	9	3+3	1	4	0	8	4
22	MF	(Azerbaijan) AZE	Afran Ismayilov	43	7	16+13	6	2+3	0	0+1	0	6+2	1
25	DF	(Albania) ALB	Ansi Agolli	39	0	23+1	0	3+1	0	4	0	7	0
32	DF	(Azerbaijan) AZE	Elvin Yunuszade	25	0	17+2	0	3+1	0	0	0	0+2	0
55	DF	(Azerbaijan) AZE	Badavi Guseynov	46	0	30	0	4	0	4	0	8	0
63	GK	(Russia) RUS	Shahrudin Mahammadaliyev	3	0	2	0	1	0	0	0	0	0
67	MF	(Morocco) MAR	Alharbi El Jadeyaoui	19	0	7+2	0	1	0	4	0	4+1	0
77	MF	(Azerbaijan) AZE	Javid Tagiyev	27	1	6+9	0	2+1	1	2+2	0	4+1	0
90	FW	(Sweden) SWE	Samuel Armenteros	32	11	14+9	7	3	3	0	0	4+2	1
91	MF	(Azerbaijan) AZE	Joshgun Diniyev	42	1	24+8	1	3+1	0	1+2	0	0+3	0
97	FW	(Azerbaijan) AZE	Mahir Madatov	21	8	12+4	7	4+1	1	0	0	0	0
99	MF	(North Macedonia) MKD	Muarem Muarem	18	4	9+5	2	2+2	2	0	0	0	0
Players away from Qarabağ on loan:
6	MF	(Azerbaijan) AZE	Vugar Mustafayev	9	1	6+2	1	0	0	0	0	0+1	0.
99	FW	(Azerbaijan) AZE	Namig Alasgarov	1	0	0	0	0+1	0	0	0	0	0
Players who appeared for Qarabağ but left during the season:
11	MF	(Azerbaijan) AZE	Elvin Mammadov	19	1	11+2	1	0	0	0+4	0	0+2	0
23	DF	(North Macedonia) MKD	Vladimir Dimitrovski	4	0	3	0	1	0	0	0	0	0
29	FW	(Netherlands) NED	Rydell Poepon	22	1	10+5	1	0	0	1+1	0	1+4	0
70	MF	(Brazil) BRA	Chumbinho	14	1	7+2	1	0+1	0	0	0	1+3	0

=== Goal scorers ===
Place	Position	Nation	Number	Name	Premier League	Azerbaijan Cup	Champions League	Europa League	Total
1	MF	(Spain)	10	Dani Quintana	15	1	0	1	17
2	MF	(Brazil)	20	Richard	9	1	0	4	14
3	FW	(Sweden)	90	Samuel Armenteros	7	3	0	1	11
4	FW	(Brazil)	9	Reynaldo	5	1	1	1	8
4	FW	(Azerbaijan)	97	Mahir Madatov	7	1	0	0	8
4	MF	(Spain)	8	Míchel	4	4	0	0	8
7	MF	(Azerbaijan)	22	Afran Ismayilov	6	0	0	1	7
8	MF	(North Macedonia)	99	Muarem Muarem	3	2	0	0	5
9	DF	(Azerbaijan)	14	Rashad Sadygov	2	0	0	0	2
9				Own goal	2	0	0	0	2
11	DF	(Azerbaijan)	2	Gara Garayev	1	0	0	0	1
11	MF	(Azerbaijan)	11	Elvin Mammadov	1	0	0	0	1
11	MF	(Azerbaijan)	91	Joshgun Diniyev	1	0	0	0	1
11	MF	(Azerbaijan)	6	Vugar Mustafayev	1	0	0	0	1
11	FW	(Netherlands)	29	Rydell Poepon	1	0	0	0	1
11	MF	(Brazil)	70	Chumbinho	1	0	0	0	1
11	MF	(Azerbaijan)	77	Javid Tagiyev	0	1	0	0	1
				TOTALS	66	14	1	8	89

=== Disciplinary record ===
Number	Nation	Position	Name	Premier League		Azerbaijan Cup		Champions League		Europa League		Total	
Number	Nation	Position	Name	Yellow card	Red card	Yellow card	Red card	Yellow card	Red card	Yellow card	Red card	Yellow card	Red card
2	(Azerbaijan)	DF	Gara Garayev	2	0	1	0	1	0	1	0	5	0
4	(Azerbaijan)	DF	Eltun Yagublu	0	1	1	0	0	0	0	0	1	1
5	(Azerbaijan)	DF	Maksim Medvedev	2	0	0	0	0	0	1	0	3	0
6	(Azerbaijan)	MF	Vugar Mustafayev	2	0	0	0	0	0	0	0	2	0
8	(Spain)	MF	Míchel	4	0	1	0	0	0	2	0	7	0
9	(Brazil)	FW	Reynaldo	1	0	0	1	0	0	1	0	2	1
10	(Spain)	MF	Dani Quintana	3	0	2	0	0	0	1	0	6	0
11	(Azerbaijan)	MF	Elvin Mammadov	1	0	0	0	0	0	0	0	1	0
13	(Bosnia and Herzegovina)	GK	Ibrahim Šehić	0	0	0	0	0	0	1	0	1	0
14	(Azerbaijan)	DF	Rashad Sadygov	3	0	0	0	0	0	1	0	4	0
18	(Azerbaijan)	MF	Ilgar Gurbanov	3	0	0	0	0	0	0	0	3	0
20	(Brazil)	MF	Richard	5	0	1	0	0	0	4	0	10	0
25	(Albania)	DF	Ansi Agolli	1	0	0	0	1	0	1	0	3	0
29	(Netherlands)	FW	Rydell Poepon	3	1	0	0	0	0	0	0	3	1
32	(Azerbaijan)	DF	Elvin Yunuszade	6	0	0	0	0	0	0	0	6	0
55	(Azerbaijan)	DF	Badavi Guseynov	2	0	0	0	0	0	0	0	2	0
70	(Brazil)	MF	Chumbinho	1	0	0	0	0	0	0	0	1	0
90	(Sweden)	FW	Samuel Armenteros	2	0	0	0	0	0	2	0	4	0
91	(Azerbaijan)	MF	Joshgun Diniyev	4	0	0	0	0	0	0	0	4	0
97	(Azerbaijan)	FW	Mahir Madatov	1	0	0	0	0	0	0	0	1	0
99	(North Macedonia)	MF	Muarem Muarem	1	0	0	0	0	0	0	0	1	0
			TOTALS	47	2	6	1	2	0	15	0	70	3

== Notes ==
- Qarabağ have played their home games at the Tofiq Bahramov Stadium since 1993 due to the ongoing situation in Quzanlı.
- Rudar Pljevlja played their home match at Stadion pod Malim Brdom, Petrovac, instead of their regular stadium Gradski stadion, Pljevlja.
