= 2013–14 FK Qarabağ season =

Qarabağ
2013–14 season
- Chairman: Tahir Gözal
- Manager: Gurban Gurbanov
- Stadium: Tofiq Bahramov Stadium^{1}
- Premier League: 1st
- Azerbaijan Cup: Quarterfinals vs Gabala
- Europa League: Play-off round vs Eintracht Frankfurt
- Top goalscorer: League: Reynaldo (22); All: Reynaldo (29)
- Highest home attendance: 30,500 vs Eintracht Frankfurt; 22 August 2013
- Lowest home attendance: 300 vs Gabala; 30 March 2014
- Average home league attendance: 1,680
Home colours	Away colours

The Qarabağ 2013–14 season was Qarabağ's 21st Azerbaijan Premier League season, and their sixth season under manager Gurban Gurbanov. They reached the Quarterfinals of the Azerbaijan Cup, losing to Gabala, and they were crowned Champions of the Premier League. Qarabağ also competed in the 2013–14 UEFA Europa League entering at the 1st qualifying round stage. They defeated Metalurg Skopje of Macedonia, Piast Gliwice of Poland and Gefle of Sweden on their way to the playoff round where they were knocked out by Eintracht Frankfurt of Germany.

== Squad ==
As of 11 April 2014

Note: Flags indicate national team as defined under FIFA eligibility rules; some limited exceptions apply. Players may hold more than one non-FIFA nationality.

No.	Pos.	Nation	Player
1	GK	AZE	Farhad Veliyev
2	DF	AZE	Gara Garayev
4	DF	AZE	Bilal Abbaszade
5	DF	AZE	Maksim Medvedev
6	DF	AZE	Haji Ahmadov
7	MF	AZE	Namiq Yusifov
9	MF	BRA	Reynaldo
10	MF	MKD	Muarem Muarem
11	FW	CGO	Ulrich Kapolongo
13	GK	BIH	Ibrahim Šehić
14	DF	AZE	Rashad Sadygov (captain)
15	MF	AZE	Toghrul Bilalli
17	FW	AZE	Vüqar Nadirov
18	MF	AZE	Ilgar Gurbanov

No.	Pos.	Nation	Player
19	FW	GEO	Jaba Dvali (loan from Dinamo Tbilisi)
20	MF	BRA	Richard
21	FW	AZE	Tural Rzayev
22	MF	AZE	Toğrul Bilallı
23	FW	AZE	Tural Isgandarov
24	DF	ALB	Admir Teli
25	DF	ALB	Ansi Agolli
27	DF	AZE	Elvin Musazade
33	MF	AZE	Tamkin Khalilzade
41	FW	NED	Leroy George
44	DF	AZE	Eltun Yagublu
55	DF	AZE	Badavi Guseynov
70	MF	BRA	Chumbinho
99	FW	GEO	Nikoloz Gelashvili

== Transfers ==
=== Summer ===
In: Note: Flags indicate national team as defined under FIFA eligibility rules; some limited exceptions apply. Players may hold more than one non-FIFA nationality.

No.	Pos.	Nation	Player
11	FW	CGO	Ulrich Kapolongo (from (Jordan) Shabab Al-Ordon)
13	GK	BIH	Ibrahim Šehić (from (Turkey) Mersin İdmanyurdu)
19	FW	AZE	Murad Sattarli (loan return from (Azerbaijan) Simurq)
41	FW	NED	Leroy George (from (Netherlands) NEC)
70	MF	BRA	Chumbinho (from (Greece) Olympiacos)
99	FW	GEO	Nikoloz Gelashvili (from (Germany) VfL Bochum)
—	FW	AZE	Bakhtiyar Soltanov (loan return from (Azerbaijan) Simurq)

Out: Note: Flags indicate national team as defined under FIFA eligibility rules; some limited exceptions apply. Players may hold more than one non-FIFA nationality.

No.	Pos.	Nation	Player
3	DF	AZE	Kamil Huseynov (loan to (Azerbaijan) Neftchala FK)
4	DF	AZE	Zaur Hashimov (to (Azerbaijan) Sumgayit)
11	FW	AZE	Branimir Subašić (to (Turkey) Orduspor)
15	FW	NGR	Emeka Opara
16	FW	AZE	Elnur Abdulov (to (Azerbaijan) Ravan Baku)
19	MF	AZE	Emin Imamaliev (to (Azerbaijan) Araz)
19	FW	AZE	Murad Sattarli (on loan to (Azerbaijan) Simurq)
22	MF	AZE	Afran Ismayilov (to (Azerbaijan) Baku)
70	FW	AZE	Vagif Javadov (to (Azerbaijan) Inter Baku)
88	MF	ARG	Cristián Torres (to (Azerbaijan) Ravan Baku)
—	FW	AZE	Bakhtiyar Soltanov (to (Azerbaijan) Ravan Baku)

=== Winter ===
In: Note: Flags indicate national team as defined under FIFA eligibility rules; some limited exceptions apply. Players may hold more than one non-FIFA nationality.

No.	Pos.	Nation	Player
19	FW	GEO	Jaba Dvali (loan from (Georgia (country)) Dinamo Tbilisi)

Out: Note: Flags indicate national team as defined under FIFA eligibility rules; some limited exceptions apply. Players may hold more than one non-FIFA nationality.

No.	Pos.	Nation	Player
3	DF	AZE	Kamil Huseynov (to (Azerbaijan) Sumgayit, previously on loan to Neftchala)
12	GK	AZE	Osman Umarov (retired)
19	MF	AZE	Murad Sattarli (to (Azerbaijan) Simurq)
89	GK	CRO	Miro Varvodić (to (Hungary) Győri ETO)

== Competitions ==
=== Friendlies ===
19 January 2014	Qarabağ (Azerbaijan)	1 – 0	(Romania) Dinamo București	Antalya, Turkey
AZT (UTC+4)	George	[ Summary]

22 January 2014	Qarabağ (Azerbaijan)	1 – 2	(Albania) Flamurtari Vlorë	Antalya, Turkey
AZT (UTC+4)	Reynaldo 24'	Summary

23 January 2014	Qarabağ (Azerbaijan)	2 – 2	(Germany) Wuppertaler SV	Antalya, Turkey
AZT (UTC+4)	Ahmadov 22'; Richard 27'	Summary

25 January 2014	Qarabağ (Azerbaijan)	Cancelled	(Ukraine) Volyn Lutsk	Antalya, Turkey
AZT (UTC+4)		Summary

=== Azerbaijan Premier League ===
==== Results summary ====
Overall								Home						Away					
Pld	W	D	L	GF	GA	GD	Pts	W	D	L	GF	GA	GD	W	D	L	GF	GA	GD
36	21	9	6	65	20	+45	72	12	3	2	40	10	+30	9	6	4	25	10	+15

Last updated: 18 May 2014.
Source: Soccerway

==== Results by round ====
Round	1	2	3	4	5	6	7	8	9	10	11	12	13	14	15	16	17	18	19	20	21	22	23	24	25	26	27	28	29	30	31	32	33	34	35	36
Ground	A	H	H	A	H	A	H	A	H	A	H	H	A	H	A	H	A	H	H	A	H	A	H	A	H	A	H	H	A	H	A	H	A	H	A	A
Result	W	W	W	W	L	D	D	D	W	W	W	W	D	D	D	W	L	W	L	W	W	W	D	W	W	W	W	W	W	W	L	D	D	W	L	L
Position	4	1	1	1	2	1	2	2	1	1	1	1	1	1	2	1	2	1	3	1	1	1	1	1	1	1	1	1	1	1	1	1	1	1	1	1

Source: Soccerway
A = Away; H = Home; W = Win; D = Draw; L = Loss

==== Results ====
4 August 2013 1	Inter Baku	1 – 2	Qarabağ	Baku
20:00 AZST (UTC+5)	Javadov 7'	Summary	Chumbinho 36'; George 57'	Stadium: Shafa Stadium; Attendance: 350; Referee: Rahim Häsänov

11 August 2013 2	Qarabağ	5 – 1	Sumgayit	Baku
20:00 AZST (UTC+5)	Gelashvili 32'; Chumbinho 50', 78'; Reynaldo 63', 90+1'	Summary	Abdullayev 65'; Hüseynov (yellow card) 57' (yellow-red card) 82'	Stadium: Tofiq Bahramov Stadium^{1} Attendance: 1,000; Referee: Vusal Aliyev

18 August 2013 3	Qarabağ	2 – 0	Khazar Lankaran	Baku
20:00 AZST (UTC+5)	Gelashvili 26'; Richard 61' (pen.)	Summary		Stadium: Tofiq Bahramov Stadium^{2} Attendance: 3,000; Referee: Rahim Häsänov

25 August 2013 4	Gabala	0 – 1	Qarabağ	Qabala
18:00 AZST (UTC+5)		Summary	Nadirov 16'	Stadium: Gabala City Stadium; Attendance: 2,000; Referee: Aliyar Ağayev

1 September 2013 5	Qarabağ	0 – 1	AZAL	Baku
20:00 AZST (UTC+5)		Summary	Arsenijević 21'	Stadium: Tofiq Bahramov Stadium^{1} Attendance: 1,500; Referee: Ramil Diniyev

13 September 2013 6	Ravan Baku	1 – 1	Qarabağ	Baku
18:00 AZST (UTC+5)	Castro-Tello 19'	Summary	George 88'	Stadium: Bayil Stadium; Attendance: 300; Referee: Sabayel Gurbanova

21 September 2013 7	Qarabağ	0 – 0	Simurq	Baku
19:30 AZST (UTC+5)		Summary	Ćeran (red card) 90+3'	Stadium: Tofiq Bahramov Stadium^{1} Attendance: 350; Referee: Rauf Jabbarov

28 September 2013 8	Neftchi Baku	0 – 0	Qarabağ	Baku
19:00 AZST (UTC+5)		Summary		Stadium: Bakcell Arena; Attendance: 2,500; Referee: Rahim Häsänov

4 October 2013 9	Qarabağ	3 – 0	Baku	Baku
20:00 AZST (UTC+5)	Agolli 37'; Nadirov 43'; Richard 45'	Summary		Stadium: Tofiq Bahramov Stadium^{1} Attendance: 1,000; Referee: Aliyar Ağayev

20 October 2013 10	Sumgayit	0 – 3	Qarabağ	Sumqayit
16:00 AZST (UTC+5)		Summary	Nazirov 5' (o.g.); Reynaldo 56'; Muarem 60'	Stadium: Mehdi Huseynzade Stadium; Attendance: 1,500; Referee: Omar Paşayev

27 October 2013 11	Khazar Lankaran	0 – 3	Qarabağ	Lankaran
19:00 AZT (UTC+4)		Summary	Reynaldo 22', 64'; Gelashvili 75'	Stadium: Lankaran City Stadium; Attendance: 7,500; Referee: Vusal Aliyev

3 November 2013 12	Qarabağ	4 – 3	Gabala	Baku
17:00 AZT (UTC+4)	Gelashvili 26', 50'; Nadirov 37'; Chumbinho 65'	Summary	Ebecilio 72'; Leonardo 77'; Dodô 85'	Stadium: Tofiq Bahramov Stadium^{1} Attendance: 1,000; Referee: Aliyar Ağayev

9 November 2013 13	AZAL	1 – 1	Qarabağ	Baku
17:00 AZST (UTC+5)	Igbekoi 33'	Summary	Medvedev 73'	Stadium: AZAL Arena; Attendance: 500; Referee: Rahim Häsänov

24 November 2013 14	Qarabağ	0 – 0	Ravan Baku	Baku
18:00 AZST (UTC+5)		Summary		Stadium: Tofiq Bahramov Stadium^{1} Attendance: 700; Referee: Rauf Jabbarov

30 November 2013 15	Simurq	0 – 0	Qarabağ	Baku
17:00 AZT (UTC+4)		Summary		Stadium: Shafa Stadium; Attendance: 2,000; Referee: Aliyar Ağayev

8 December 2013 16	Qarabağ	3 – 1	Neftchi Baku	Baku
18:00 AZT (UTC+4)	Reynaldo 6', 58'; Chumbinho 73' (pen.)	Summary	Cardoso 56'	Stadium: Tofiq Bahramov Stadium^{1} Attendance: 1,500; Referee: Vusal Aliyev

15 December 2013 17	Baku	2 – 1	Qarabağ	Baku
14:00 AZT (UTC+4)	Česnauskis 60'; Aliyev 73'	Summary	Kapolongo 76'	Stadium: Tofiq Bahramov Stadium; Attendance: 1,000; Referee: Rahim Häsänov

20 December 2013 18	Qarabağ	2 – 0	Inter Baku	Baku
17:00 AZT (UTC+4)	Nadirov 58'; Richard 65'	Summary		Stadium: Tofiq Bahramov Stadium^{1} Attendance: 500; Referee: Aliyar Ağayev

1 February 2014 19	Qarabağ	0 – 1	Khazar Lankaran	Baku
17:00 AZT (UTC+4)		Summary	Scarlatache 49'	Stadium: Bakcell Arena^{2} Attendance: 1,000; Referee: Ramil Diniyev

8 February 2014 20	Gabala	0 – 1	Qarabağ	Qabala
14:30 AZT (UTC+4)		Summary	Reynaldo 74'	Stadium: Gabala City Stadium; Attendance: 2,800; Referee: Aliyar Ağayev

15 February 2014 21	Qarabağ	2 – 1	AZAL	Baku
17:00 AZT (UTC+4)	Narimanov 33' (o.g.); Chumbinho 47'	Summary	Igbekoi 66'	Stadium: Bakcell Arena^{2} Attendance: 1,500; Referee: Orkhan Mämmädov

19 February 2014 22	Ravan Baku	2 – 0	Qarabağ	Baku
17:00 AZT (UTC+4)		Summary	George 61', 68'	Stadium: Bayil Stadium; Attendance: 1,000; Referee: Omar Paşayev

23 February 2014 23	Qarabağ	0 – 0	Simurq	Baku
15:00 AZT (UTC+4)		Summary		Stadium: Bakcell Arena^{2} Attendance: 500; Referee: Fariz Yusifov

28 February 2014 24	Neftchi Baku	1 – 4	Qarabağ	Baku
17:00 AZT (UTC+4)	Abdullayev (red card) 62'; Seyidov 83'	Summary	George 23'; Reynaldo 31', 68', 87'	Stadium: Bakcell Arena; Attendance: 2,000; Referee: Vusal Aliyev

9 March 2014 25	Qarabağ	4 – 0	Baku	Baku
16:00 AZT (UTC+4)	Chumbinho 17'; Reynaldo 28', 43' (pen.); George 67'	Summary		Stadium: Tofiq Bahramov Stadium^{1} Attendance: 1,500; Referee: Rauf Jabbarov

16 March 2014 26	Inter Baku	0 – 3	Qarabağ	Baku
17:00 AZT (UTC+4)		Summary	George 38'; Nadirov 60'; Medvedev 89'	Stadium: Shafa Stadium; Attendance: 2,000; Referee: Fariz Yusifov

23 March 2014 27	Qarabağ	3 – 0	Sumgayit	Baku
17:00 AZT (UTC+4)	Reynaldo 70', 72'; Richard 76'	Summary		Stadium: Tofiq Bahramov Stadium^{1} Attendance: 800; Referee: Vusal Aliyev

30 March 2014 28	Qarabağ	3 – 0	Gabala	Baku
18:00 AZST (UTC+5)	Chumbinho 48'; Reynaldo 65', 87'; Gurbanov (yellow card) 66'	Summary	Abbasov (yellow card) 35'; Mendy (yellow card) 38'; Allahverdiyev (yellow card) 76' (yellow-red card) 78'	Stadium: Tofiq Bahramov Stadium^{1} Attendance: 300; Referee: Rahim Häsänov

5 April 2014 29	AZAL	0 – 2	Qarabağ	Baku
17:00 AZST (UTC+5)		Summary	Reynaldo 24'; Richard 59'	Stadium: AZAL Arena; Attendance: 800; Referee: Ramil Diniyev

11 April 2014 30	Qarabağ	5 – 1	Ravan Baku	Baku
18:30 AZST (UTC+5)	George 34', 65'; Muarem 62'; Richard 71'; Reynaldo 90' (pen.)	Summary	Miracema 68'; O.Lalayev (yellow card) 57' (yellow-red card) 89'	Stadium: Tofiq Bahramov Stadium^{1} Attendance: 1,000; Referee: Alik Yunusov

20 April 2014 31	Simurq	1 – 0	Qarabağ	Zaqatala
17:00 AZST (UTC+5)	Ćeran 37'	Summary		Stadium: Zaqatala City Stadium; Attendance: 1,400; Referee: Orkhan Mämmädov

27 April 2014 32	Qarabağ	1 – 1	Neftchi Baku	Baku
20:00 AZST (UTC+5)	Muarem 51'	Summary	Flavinho 40'	Stadium: Tofiq Bahramov Stadium^{1} Attendance: 3,000; Referee: Fariz Yusifov

2 May 2014 33	Baku	0 – 0	Qarabağ	Baku
15:00 AZST (UTC+5)		Summary		Stadium: Tofiq Bahramov Stadium; Attendance: 500; Referee: Ramil Diniyev

7 May 2014 34	Qarabağ	4 – 1	Inter Baku	Baku
19:00 AZST (UTC+5)	Reynaldo 12', 70', 85'; Muarem 86'	Summary	Tskhadadze 74'	Stadium: Tofiq Bahramov Stadium^{1} Attendance: 4,000; Referee: Orkhan Mämmädov

12 May 2014 35	Sumagyit	1 – 0	Qarabağ	Sumqayit
18:00 AZST (UTC+5)	Kurbanov 49'	Summary		Stadium: Mehdi Huseynzade Stadium; Attendance: 1,350; Referee: Rauf Jabbarov

17 May 2014 36	Khazar Lankaran	2 – 1	Qarabağ	Lankaran
18:30 AZST (UTC+5)	Thiego 5'; E.Abdullayev 84'	Summary	Kapolongo 44'	Stadium: Lankaran City Stadium; Attendance: 1,200; Referee: Vusal Aliyev

==== League table ====
Pos	Team	Pld	W	D	L	GF	GA	GD	Pts	Qualification or relegation
1	Qarabağ (C)	36	21	9	6	65	21	+44	72	Qualification for Champions League second qualifying round
2	Inter Baku	36	20	7	9	60	37	+23	67	Qualification for Europa League first qualifying round
3	Gabala	36	18	7	11	48	36	+12	61	Qualification for Europa League first qualifying round
4	Neftçi Baku	36	17	9	10	47	43	+4	60	Qualification for Europa League second qualifying round
5	Baku	36	16	9	11	53	43	+10	57	

Source: Azerbaijan Professional Football league
Rules for classification: 1) points; 2) goal difference; 3) number of goals scored.
(C) Champions

=== Azerbaijan Cup ===
4 December 2013 Second Round	Qarabağ	1 – 0	AZAL	Baku
16:30 AZT (UTC+4)	Reynaldo 79'	Summary	Shemonayev (yellow card) 43' (yellow-red card) 64'	Stadium: Tofiq Bahramov Stadium^{1} Attendance: 200; Referee: Ramil Diniyev

12 March 2014 Quarterfinals 1st leg	Gabala	0 – 0	Qarabağ	Qabala
14:30 AZT (UTC+4)		Summary		Stadium: Gabala City Stadium; Attendance: 1,200; Referee: Rahim Häsänov

19 March 2014 Quarterfinals 2nd leg	Qarabağ	1 – 2 (1 – 2 agg.)	Gabala	Baku
17:00 AZT (UTC+4)	Reynaldo 61'	Summary	Subotić 45+1'; Mendy 82'	Stadium: Tofiq Bahramov Stadium^{1} Attendance: 2,000; Referee: Rahim Häsänov

=== UEFA Europa League ===
==== Qualifying phase ====
2 July 2013 1st qualifying round 1st leg	Metalurg Skopje (North Macedonia)	0 – 1	(Azerbaijan) Qarabağ	Skopje, Macedonia
20:45 AZST (UTC+5)		Summary	Reynaldo 64'	Stadium: Philip II Arena; Attendance: 425; Referee: Lars Christoffersen (Denmark)

11 July 2013 1st qualifying round 2nd leg	Qarabağ (Azerbaijan)	1 – 0 (2 – 0 agg.)	(North Macedonia) Metalurg Skopje	Baku, Azerbaijan
21:00 AZST (UTC+5)	George 65'	Report		Stadium: Tofiq Bahramov Stadium^{1} Attendance: 5,000; Referee: Radek Matějek (Czech Republic)

18 July 2013 2nd qualifying round 1st leg	Qarabağ (Azerbaijan)	2 – 1	(Poland) Piast Gliwice	Baku, Azerbaijan
21:00 AZST (UTC+5)	Richard 40'; Reynaldo 83'	Report	Sikora 19'	Stadium: Tofiq Bahramov Stadium^{1} Attendance: 11,000; Referee: Damir Batinić (Croatia)

25 July 2013 2nd qualifying round 2nd leg	Piast Gliwice (Poland)	2 – 2 (a.e.t.) (3 – 4 agg.)	(Azerbaijan) Qarabağ	Gliwice, Poland
20:30 AZST (UTC+5)	Matras 29'; Robak 36'	Report	George 8'; Kapolongo 108'	Stadium: Stadion Miejski; Attendance: 8,534; Referee: Stanislav Todorov (Bulgaria)

1 August 2013 3rd qualifying round 1st leg	Qarabağ (Azerbaijan)	1 – 0	(Sweden) Gefle	Baku, Azerbaijan
21:00 AZST (UTC+5)	Reynaldo 89'	Report		Stadium: Tofiq Bahramov Stadium^{1} Attendance: 22,000; Referee: Nicolas Rainville (France)

8 August 2013 3rd qualifying round 2nd leg	Gefle (Sweden)	0 – 2 (0 – 3 agg.)	(Azerbaijan) Qarabağ	Sundsvall, Sweden
22:00 AZST (UTC+5)		Report	Chumbinho 41'; Reynaldo 50'	Stadium: Norrporten Arena; Attendance: 1,137; Referee: Stephan Klossner (Switzerland)

22 August 2013 Play-off round 1st leg	Qarabağ (Azerbaijan)	0 – 2	(Germany) Eintracht Frankfurt	Baku, Azerbaijan
21:00 AZST (UTC+5)		Report	Meier 6', 75'	Stadium: Tofiq Bahramov Stadium^{1} Attendance: 30,500; Referee: Szymon Marciniak (Poland)

29 August 2013 Play-off round 2nd leg	Eintracht Frankfurt (Germany)	2 – 1 (4 – 1 agg.)	(Azerbaijan) Qarabağ	Frankfurt, Germany
23:30 AZST (UTC+5)	Meier 10'; Inui 75'	Report	Reynaldo 58'	Stadium: Commerzbank-Arena; Attendance: 47,000; Referee: Duarte Gomes (Portugal)

== Squad statistics ==
As of Match Played 17 May 2014

=== Appearances and goals ===
No.	Pos	Nat	Player	Total		Premier League		Azerbaijan Cup		Europa League	
No.	Pos	Nat	Player	Apps	Goals	Apps	Goals	Apps	Goals	Apps	Goals
1	GK	(Azerbaijan) AZE	Farhad Veliyev	12	0	12+0	0	0+0	0	0+0	0
2	DF	(Azerbaijan) AZE	Gara Garayev	43	0	27+5	0	2+1	0	7+1	0
5	DF	(Azerbaijan) AZE	Maksim Medvedev	43	2	31+1	2	3+0	0	8+0	0
6	DF	(Azerbaijan) AZE	Haji Ahmadov	17	0	11+5	0	1+0	0	0+0	0
7	MF	(Azerbaijan) AZE	Namiq Yusifov	32	0	11+10	0	3+0	0	5+3	0
9	MF	(Brazil) BRA	Reynaldo	40	29	29+2	22	0+2	2	5+2	5
10	MF	(North Macedonia) MKD	Muarem Muarem	34	4	15+12	4	3+0	0	3+1	0
11	FW	(Republic of the Congo) CGO	Ulrich Kapolongo	21	3	3+9	2	2+0	0	1+6	1
13	GK	(Bosnia and Herzegovina) BIH	Ibrahim Šehić	25	0	22+0	0	3+0	0	0+0	0
14	DF	(Azerbaijan) AZE	Rashad Sadygov	34	0	22+3	0	1+0	0	8+0	0
15	MF	(Azerbaijan) AZE	Toghrul Bilalli	1	0	0+1	0	0+0	0	0+0	0
17	FW	(Azerbaijan) AZE	Vüqar Nadirov	42	5	19+14	5	2+1	0	5+1	0
18	MF	(Azerbaijan) AZE	Ilgar Gurbanov	16	0	6+9	0	1+0	0	0+0	0
19	FW	(Georgia (country)) GEO	Jaba Dvali	6	0	2+3	0	0+1	0	0+0	0
20	MF	(Brazil) BRA	Richard	38	6	26+2	5	3+0	0	7+0	1
21	FW	(Azerbaijan) AZE	Tural Rzayev	1	0	1+0	0	0+0	0	0+0	0
22	MF	(Azerbaijan) AZE	Toğrul Bilallı	2	0	1+1	0	0+0	0	0+0	0
23	FW	(Azerbaijan) AZE	Tural Isgandarov	3	0	0+3	0	0+0	0	0+0	0
24	DF	(Albania) ALB	Admir Teli	29	0	17+2	0	2+0	0	8+0	0
25	DF	(Albania) ALB	Ansi Agolli	44	1	33+1	1	2+0	0	8+0	0
32	MF	(Azerbaijan) AZE	Ülvi Rəfizadə	1	0	0+1	0	0+0	0	0+0	0
33	MF	(Azerbaijan) AZE	Tamkin Khalilzade	4	0	3+1	0	0+0	0	0+0	0
41	FW	(Netherlands) NED	Leroy George	43	11	23+9	9	2+1	0	5+3	2
44	DF	(Azerbaijan) AZE	Eltun Yagublu	1	0	1+0	0	0+0	0	0+0	0
55	DF	(Azerbaijan) AZE	Badavi Guseynov	36	0	31+1	0	3+0	0	0+1	0
70	MF	(Brazil) BRA	Chumbinho	40	9	33+0	8	0+3	0	3+1	1
99	FW	(Georgia (country)) GEO	Nikoloz Gelashvili	34	5	15+11	5	0+0	0	7+1	0
Players who appeared for Qarabağ no longer at the club:
19	FW	(Azerbaijan) AZE	Murad Sattarli	4	0	0+0	0	0+0	0	0+4	0
89	GK	(Croatia) CRO	Miro Varvodić	10	0	2+0	0	0+0	0	8+0	0

=== Goal scorers ===
Place	Position	Nation	Number	Name	Premier League	Azerbaijan Cup	Europa League	Total
1	MF	(Brazil)	9	Reynaldo	22	2	5	29
2	FW	(Netherlands)	41	Leroy George	9	0	2	11
3	MF	(Brazil)	70	Chumbinho	8	0	1	9
4	MF	(Brazil)	20	Richard	6	0	1	7
5	FW	(Georgia (country))	99	Nikoloz Gelashvili	5	0	0	5
6	FW	(Azerbaijan)	17	Vüqar Nadirov	4	0	0	4
6	MF	(North Macedonia)	10	Muarem Muarem	4	0	0	4
8	FW	(Republic of the Congo)	11	Ulrich Kapolongo	2	0	1	3
9	DF	(Azerbaijan)	5	Maksim Medvedev	2	0	0	2
9				Own goal	2	0	0	2
11	DF	(Albania)	25	Ansi Agolli	1	0	0	1
				TOTALS	64	2	10	76

=== Disciplinary record ===
Number	Nation	Position	Name	Premier League		Azerbaijan Cup		Europa League		Total	
Number	Nation	Position	Name	Yellow card	Red card	Yellow card	Red card	Yellow card	Red card	Yellow card	Red card
1	(Azerbaijan)	GK	Farhad Veliyev	1	0	0	0	0	0	1	0
2	(Azerbaijan)	DF	Gara Garayev	5	0	0	0	1	0	6	0
5	(Azerbaijan)	DF	Maksim Medvedev	7	0	2	0	1	0	10	0
6	(Azerbaijan)	DF	Haji Ahmadov	1	0	0	0	0	0	1	0
7	(Azerbaijan)	MF	Namiq Yusifov	3	0	0	0	0	0	3	0
9	(Brazil)	MF	Reynaldo	6	0	0	0	1	0	7	0
10	(North Macedonia)	MF	Muarem Muarem	2	0	0	0	0	0	2	0
11	(Republic of the Congo)	FW	Ulrich Kapolongo	1	0	1	0	0	0	2	0
13	(Bosnia and Herzegovina)	GK	Ibrahim Šehić	1	0	0	0	0	0	1	0
14	(Azerbaijan)	DF	Rashad Sadygov	8	0	1	0	1	0	10	0
17	(Azerbaijan)	FW	Vüqar Nadirov	4	0	1	0	1	0	6	0
18	(Azerbaijan)	MF	Ilgar Gurbanov	2	0	0	0	0	0	2	0
20	(Azerbaijan)	FW	Richard	9	0	0	0	2	0	11	0
24	(Albania)	DF	Admir Teli	0	0	0	0	1	0	1	0
25	(Albania)	DF	Ansi Agolli	3	0	0	0	1	0	4	0
33	(Azerbaijan)	FW	Tamkin Khalilzade	1	0	0	0	0	0	2	0
41	(Netherlands)	FW	Leroy George	1	0	0	0	0	0	2	0
55	(Azerbaijan)	DF	Badavi Guseynov	3	0	0	0	0	0	3	0
89	(Croatia)	GK	Miro Varvodić	0	0	0	0	1	0	1	0
99	(Georgia (country))	FW	Nikoloz Gelashvili	2	0	0	0	1	0	3	0
			TOTALS	60	0	5	0	11	0	75	0

== Notes ==
- Qarabağ have played their home games at the Tofiq Bahramov Stadium since 1993 due to the ongoing situation in Quzanlı.
- Qarabağ vs Khazar Lankaran was played at the Bakcell Arena due to the Tofiq Bahramov Stadium^{1} pitch being relaid.
