= 2017 FC Aktobe season =

FC Aktobe
2017 season
- Chairman: Sagat Yensegenuly
- Manager: Ihor Rakhayev (Until 13 May); Igorya Prohnitskogo (Caretaker) (13-24 May); Vladimir Mukhanov (from 24 May)
- Stadium: Central Stadium
- Premier League: 9th
- Kazakhstan Cup: Quarter-final vs Atyrau
- Top goalscorer: League: Ihar Zyankovich (9); All: Ihar Zyankovich (9)
Home colours	Away colours

The 2017 FC Aktobe season is the 23rd successive season that the club playing in the Kazakhstan Premier League, the highest tier of association football in Kazakhstan. Aktobe will also participate in the Kazakhstan Cup.

== Season events ==
Prior to the start of the season, Ihor Rakhayev replaced Yuri Utkulbayev as the club's manager.

Aktobe's home games against Atyrau on 16 April, and Shakhter Karagandy on 22 April where postponed as the pitch at their stadium was not ready after an extended period of winter weather.

On 13 May, Ihor Rakhayev was sacked as manager, with Igorya Prohnitskogo taking temporary charge. On 24 May, Vladimir Mukhanov was announced as the club's new manager.

== Squad ==
As of 30 July 2017

Note: Flags indicate national team as defined under FIFA eligibility rules; some limited exceptions apply. Players may hold more than one non-FIFA nationality.

No.	Pos.	Nation	Player
2	DF	KAZ	Rafkat Aslan
3	MF	CMR	Joseph Nane
4	DF	UKR	Oleksandr Volovyk
5	DF	KAZ	Bagdat Kairov
7	MF	KAZ	Bauyrzhan Baitana
14	DF	KAZ	Berik Aitbayev
17	MF	KAZ	Igor Boychuk
18	MF	AUT	Tomáš Šimkovič
20	MF	KAZ	Ardak Saulet
22	MF	KAZ	Kirill Shestakov
24	MF	KAZ	Ruslan Valiullin
25	DF	KAZ	Sayat Zhumagali
30	DF	SVK	Kristián Kolčák
31	MF	KAZ	Abay Zhunusov (loan from Astana)

No.	Pos.	Nation	Player
32	GK	KAZ	Samat Otarbayev
35	DF	FRA	Jérémy Faug-Porret
45	MF	SRB	Slobodan Simović
47	MF	KAZ	Aslanbek Kakimov
50	FW	MKD	Dušan Savić
55	GK	KAZ	Andrei Sidelnikov
66	MF	KAZ	Rakhimzhan Rozybakiyev
77	MF	MKD	Muarem Muarem
80	MF	KAZ	Anton Skvortsov
86	FW	MNE	Marko Obradović
87	FW	BLR	Ihar Zyankovich
88	MF	KAZ	Anton Shurigin
95	FW	KAZ	Abat Aimbetov

== Transfers ==
=== Winter ===
In: Note: Flags indicate national team as defined under FIFA eligibility rules; some limited exceptions apply. Players may hold more than one non-FIFA nationality.

No.	Pos.	Nation	Player
2	DF	KAZ	Rafkat Aslan (from (Kazakhstan) Tobol)
4	DF	UKR	Oleksandr Volovyk (from (Ukraine) Shakhtar Donetsk)
6	DF	BRA	Juninho (from (Brazil) Coimbra)
7	MF	KAZ	Bauyrzhan Baitana (from (Kazakhstan) Taraz)
10	MF	BRA	Vitor Júnior (from (Saudi Arabia) Al-Qadisiyah)
11	FW	BRA	Cassiano (loan from (Brazil) Internacional)
12	DF	KAZ	Damir Dautov (from (Kazakhstan) Irtysh Pavlodar)
14	DF	KAZ	Berik Aitbayev (from (Kazakhstan) Atyrau)
19	MF	ARG	Chaco Torres (from (Argentina) Chacarita Juniors)
20	MF	KAZ	Ardak Saulet (from (Kazakhstan) Astana)
30	DF	SEN	Papa Gueye (from (Russia) Rostov)
32	GK	KAZ	Samat Otarbayev (from (Kazakhstan) Ordabasy, previously on loan)
39	FW	BRA	Yuri Mamute (loan from (Brazil) Grêmio)
55	GK	KAZ	Andrei Sidelnikov (from (Kazakhstan) Kairat)
66	MF	KAZ	Rakhimzhan Rozybakiev (from (Kazakhstan) Akzhayik)
73	FW	UKR	Oleksandr Yermachenko (from (Georgia (country)) Zugdidi)
87	FW	BLR	Ihar Zyankovich
88	MF	KAZ	Anton Shurigin (from (Kazakhstan) Akzhayik)

Out: Note: Flags indicate national team as defined under FIFA eligibility rules; some limited exceptions apply. Players may hold more than one non-FIFA nationality.

No.	Pos.	Nation	Player
1	GK	KAZ	Tamabay Mұhambet
2	DF	RUS	Marat Sitdikov (to (Russia) Neftekhimik Nizhnekamsk)
3	DF	CIV	Kouassi Kouadja (to (Belarus) Slutsk)
6	MF	KAZ	Viktor Kryukov
7	FW	KAZ	Abat Aimbetov
8	FW	KAZ	Aleksey Shchotkin (loan return to (Kazakhstan) Astana)
10	MF	KAZ	Didar Zhalmukan
11	MF	UZB	Bobir Davlatov (loan return to (Russia) Rubin Kazan)
14	DF	RUS	Sandro Tsveiba (to (Russia) Krylia Sovetov)
17	DF	KAZ	Nurbol Zhumashev
21	DF	KAZ	Yegor Azovskiy
33	MF	SRB	Vuk Mitošević (to (Serbia) Javor Ivanjica)
35	GK	KAZ	Stanislav Pavlov (to (Kazakhstan) Tobol)
69	MF	RUS	Nikita Bocharov (to (Kazakhstan) Ordabasy)
72	FW	SRB	Nemanja Nikolić (to (Serbia) Spartak Subotica)
80	DF	RUS	Yegor Sorokin (loan return to (Russia) Rubin Kazan)

Trial: Note: Flags indicate national team as defined under FIFA eligibility rules; some limited exceptions apply. Players may hold more than one non-FIFA nationality.

No.	Pos.	Nation	Player
—	DF	CIV	Cédric Gogoua

=== Summer ===
In: Note: Flags indicate national team as defined under FIFA eligibility rules; some limited exceptions apply. Players may hold more than one non-FIFA nationality.

No.	Pos.	Nation	Player
3	MF	CMR	Joseph Nane (from (Kazakhstan) Okzhetpes)
18	MF	AUT	Tomáš Šimkovič (from (Kazakhstan) Tobol)
24	MF	KAZ	Ruslan Valiullin (from (Kazakhstan) Akzhayik)
30	DF	SVK	Kristián Kolčák (from (Hungary) Gyirmót)
31	MF	KAZ	Abay Zhunusov (loan from (Kazakhstan) Astana)
35	DF	FRA	Jérémy Faug-Porret (from (Switzerland) Servette)
45	MF	SRB	Slobodan Simović (from (Israel) Hapoel Kfar Saba)
50	FW	MKD	Dušan Savić (to (Kazakhstan) Tobol)
77	MF	MKD	Muarem Muarem (from (Azerbaijan) Qarabağ)
86	FW	MNE	Marko Obradović (from (Bosnia and Herzegovina) Radnik Bijeljina)
95	FW	KAZ	Abat Aimbetov

Out: Note: Flags indicate national team as defined under FIFA eligibility rules; some limited exceptions apply. Players may hold more than one non-FIFA nationality.

No.	Pos.	Nation	Player
6	DF	BRA	Juninho (to (Brazil) Vitória)
10	MF	BRA	Vitor Júnior
11	FW	BRA	Cassiano (loan return to (Brazil) Internacional)
12	DF	KAZ	Damir Dautov (to (Kazakhstan) Irtysh Pavlodar)
19	MF	ARG	Chaco Torres
30	DF	SEN	Papa Gueye
39	FW	BRA	Yuri Mamute (loan return to (Brazil) Grêmio)
42	GK	KAZ	Igor Trofimets
70	MF	KAZ	Abilkhan Abdukarimov
73	FW	UKR	Oleksandr Yermachenko

== Friendlies ==
14 June 2017	Aktobe (Kazakhstan)	1 – 1	(Russia) SKA-Khabarovsk	Ramenskoye, Russia
20:00 (UTC+6)	Zyankovich	Report	Goal	Stadium: Saturn Stadium

== Competitions ==
=== Kazakhstan Premier League ===
==== Results summary ====
Overall								Home						Away					
Pld	W	D	L	GF	GA	GD	Pts	W	D	L	GF	GA	GD	W	D	L	GF	GA	GD
33	8	9	16	37	45	−8	33	5	3	8	16	19	−3	3	6	8	21	26	−5

Last updated: 28 5 November 2017.
Source: See Results

==== Results by round ====
Round	1	2	3	4	5	6	7	8	9	10	11	12	13	14	15	16	17	18	19	20	21	22	23	24	25	26	27	28	29	30	31	32	33
Ground	A	A	H	A	H	A	A	H	A	H	H	A	H	H	A	H	A	H	A	H	A	H	H	A	A	H	A	H	H	A	A	H	A
Result	L	D	L	W	D	L	L	D	L	L	W	L	L	L	L	L	W	W	D	D	D	L	L	D	W	W	D	W	L	L	D	W	L
Position	10	9	10	7	8	9	10	10	11	12	12	12	11	12	12	12	12	11	11	11	11	11	12	12	10	10	10	10	10	10	9	9	9

Source: See Results
A = Away; H = Home; W = Win; D = Draw; L = Loss

==== Results ====
8 March 2017 1	Kairat	1 – 0	Aktobe	Almaty
16:00 (UTC+6)	Gohou 65'; Pokatilov (yellow card) 90+3'	Summary	Volovyk (yellow card) 7'; Cassiano (yellow card) 15'; A.Shurigin (yellow card) 33'; Mamute (yellow card) 53'	Stadium: Central Stadium; Attendance: 10,000; Referee: Furkhat Atazhanov

12 March 2017 2	Tobol	0 – 0	Aktobe	Kostanay
14:00 (UTC+6)	Mukhutdinov (yellow card) 73'; Šimkovič (yellow card) 87'; G.Sartakov (yellow card) 90'	Summary	A.Shurigin (yellow card) 24'; R.Aslan (yellow card) 31'; Shestakov (yellow card) 80'	Stadium: Stadion Zatobolets; Attendance: 4,000; Referee: Denis Tevyashov

18 March 2017 3	Aktobe	0 – 1	Ordabasy	Aktobe
16:00 (UTC+6)	Cassiano (yellow card) 10' (yellow-red card) 76'; R.Aslan (yellow card) 17'; Volovyk (yellow card) 90+3'	Summary	Nusserbayev 7' (yellow card) 53'; B.Kozhabayev (yellow card) 20'; Diakate (yellow card) 80'; Nurgaliev (yellow card) 81'; Buleshev (yellow card) 90+2'	Stadium: Central Stadium; Attendance: 2,800; Referee: Artyom Kuchin

31 March 2017 4	Irtysh Pavlodar	1 – 3	Aktobe	Pavlodar
17:00 (UTC+6)	Fofana 55'; Fonseca (yellow card) 82'; Dja Djédjé (yellow card) 90+4'	Summary	Juninho 63'; A.Shurigin (yellow card) 65'; Shestakov 72'; Zyankovich 77'	Stadium: Central Stadium; Attendance: 2,500; Referee: Bolat Karlibayev

8 April 2017 5	Aktobe	1 – 1	Akzhayik	Aktobe
16:00 (UTC+6)	Cassiano (yellow card) 30' (goal) 87'; R.Aslan (yellow card) 56'	Summary	M.Sapanov 10' 60'; A.Shabaev (yellow card) 53'; Valiullin (yellow card) 67' (yellow-red card) 80'; Nikolić (yellow card) 76'; Rubio (yellow card) 90+3'	Stadium: Central Stadium; Attendance: 3,000; Referee: Grigory Moskovchenko

12 April 2017 6	Astana	3 – 0	Aktobe	Astana
15:00 (UTC+6)	Logvinenko 12'; Llullaku (yellow card) 63'; Grahovac (yellow card) 70'; Kabananga 87' (pen.); D.Zhalmukan 90+1'	Summary	Volovyk (yellow card) 80'	Stadium: Tarlan Arena; Attendance: 1,000; Referee: Aleksandr Aliyev

16 April 2017 7	Aktobe	–	Atyrau	Aktobe
(UTC+6)		[ Summary]		Stadium: Central Stadium

22 April 2017 8	Aktobe	–	Shakhter Karagandy	Aktobe
(UTC+6)		[ Summary]		Stadium: Central Stadium

29 April 2017 9	Okzhetpes	2 – 1	Aktobe	Astana
17:00 (UTC+6)	S.Shaff 1'; Horvat (yellow card) 61'; Chertov (yellow card) 65'; Fedin (yellow card) 79'; N.Dairov (yellow card) 87'; Dosmagambetov 90+1'	Report	Chertov 11' (o.g.); Torres (yellow card) 27'; Zyankovich (yellow card) 30'	Stadium: Tarlan Arena; Attendance: 950; Referee: Aleksandr Gauzer

2 May 2017 10	Aktobe	1 – 1	Taraz	Aktobe
20:00 (UTC+6)	Juninho (yellow card) 27'; Mamute (yellow card) 33'; Shestakov (yellow card) 44'; Júnior (yellow card) 45+1'; B.Baitana 57'	Summary	Feshchuk 27'; B.Shadmanov (yellow card) 39'; Kurgulin (yellow card) 45+1'; M.Raimbek (yellow card) 87'; Mukhametshin (yellow card) 90+2'	Stadium: Central Stadium; Attendance: 8,000; Referee: Georgiy Chekhovskiy

6 May 2017 11	Kaisar	3 – 2	Aktobe	Kyzylorda
18:00 (UTC+6)	Arzhanov 16', 41'; Lamanje (yellow card) 80'; V.Chureyev (yellow card) 85'; Kamara (yellow card) 86'; Baizhanov 90+3' (pen.)	Report	Júnior (yellow card) 19' (goal) 50'; B.Aitbayev (yellow card) 32'; Zyankovich 56'; Gueye (red card) 90'	Stadium: Gani Muratbayev Stadium; Attendance: 2,000; Referee: Denis Tevyashov

14 May 2017 12	Aktobe	1 – 3	Tobol	Aktobe
19:00 (UTC+6)	B.Baitana (yellow card) 72'; Mamute 77'	Report	Tagybergen (yellow card) 8'; Shchotkin 41'; Malyi 48'; R.Jalilov 52'	Stadium: Central Stadium; Attendance: 7,000; Referee: Igor Aleshin

17 May 2017 7	Aktobe	1 – 0	Atyrau	Aktobe
20:00 (UTC+6)	B.Baitana (yellow card) 7'; Shestakov (yellow card) 72'; Mamute 80' (pen.) (yellow card) 80'	Report	Obšivač (yellow card) 79'; Lobjanidze (yellow card) 85'; A.Marov (yellow card) 90+1'	Stadium: Central Stadium; Attendance: 5,500; Referee: Marat Iskakov

20 May 2017 13	Ordabasy	2 – 1	Aktobe	Shymkent
17:00 (UTC+6)	M.Tolebek (yellow card) 23' (yellow-red card) 74'; B.Beisenov (yellow card) 28'; E.Tungyshbaev 31'; Diakate (yellow card) 33'; Nusserbayev 39'	Report	B.Kairov (yellow card) 16' (yellow-red card) 54'; Júnior (yellow card) 45+1'; R.Aslan (yellow card) 67'; Mamute 90+2'	Stadium: Kazhymukan Munaitpasov Stadium; Attendance: 2,700; Referee: Aleksei Bobrov

27 May 2017 14	Aktobe	1 – 2	Irtysh Pavlodar	Aktobe
19:00 (UTC+6)	B.Baitana (yellow card) 10'; Mamute (yellow card) 62'; Zyankovich 73'	Report	Fofana (yellow card) 21'; Tkachuk 56'; António (yellow card) 67'; Fonseca 87'	Stadium: Central Stadium; Attendance: 8,000; Referee: Timur Kumashev

3 June 2017 15	Akzhayik	–	Aktobe	Oral
15:00 (UTC+6)				Stadium: Petr Atoyan Stadium

18 June 2017 16	Aktobe	2 – 4	Astana	Aktobe
19:00 (UTC+6)	Zyankovich 18'; B.Kairov (yellow card) 36'; Grahovac 45+1' (o.g.); Šimkovič (yellow card) 90+3'	Report	Twumasi 19', 56'; Kabananga 47'; Mayewski (yellow card) 52'; Muzhikov 86'; Beisebekov (yellow card) 90+3'	Stadium: Central Stadium; Attendance: 9,500; Referee: Bagdat Abdullaev

25 June 2017 17	Atyrau	2 – 0	Aktobe	Atyrau
19:00 (UTC+6)	Sikimić (yellow card) 6'; Obšivač 81'; Maksimović 84' (pen.)	Report	B.Kairov (yellow card) 44'; Šimkovič (yellow card) 52'; S.Zhumagali (yellow card) 84'; Mamute (yellow card) 86'	Stadium: Munaishy Stadium; Attendance: 4,000; Referee: Aydin Rakhimbayev

28 June 2017 8	Aktobe	0 – 1	Shakhter Karagandy	Aktobe
20:00 (UTC+6)	R.Rozybakiev (yellow card) 39'	Report	Y.Tarasov (yellow card) 8'; Stojanović 90' (pen.); Skorykh (yellow card) 55'; Szöke (yellow card) 66'; A.Tattybaev (yellow card) 90+6'	Stadium: Central Stadium; Attendance: 6,600; Referee: Denis Izmailov

2 July 2017 18	Shakhter Karagandy	0 – 2	Aktobe	Karaganda
19:00 (UTC+6)	Stanojević (yellow card) 13'; Aiyegbusi (yellow card) 51'; Dmitrenko (yellow card) 54'	Report	Zyankovich 24' (pen.), 28'; Shestakov (yellow card) 44'; A.Saulet (yellow card) 64'	Stadium: Shakhter Stadium; Attendance: 3,000; Referee: Marat Iskakov

8 July 2017 19	Aktobe	3 – 0	Okzhetpes	Aktobe
19:00 (UTC+6)	Savić 14', 38' (yellow card) 80'; Zyankovich (yellow card) 18'; S.Zhumagali (yellow card) 58'; B.Baitana 87'	Report	Freidgeimas (yellow card) 36'; T.Adyrbekov (yellow card) 64'; Abdulin (yellow card) 69'; Dosmagambetov (yellow card) 75'	Stadium: Central Stadium; Attendance: 8,500; Referee: Aleksandr Aliyev

15 July 2017 20	Taraz	1 – 1	Aktobe	Taraz
19:00 (UTC+6)	Mijušković 45+1'	Report	Shestakov (yellow card) 28'; B.Kairov (yellow card) 45+1'; B.Shadmanov 50' (o.g.)	Stadium: Central Stadium; Attendance: 3,500; Referee: Bolat Karlibayev

22 July 2017 21	Aktobe	1 – 1	Kaisar	Aktobe
21:00 (UTC+6)	B.Kairov (yellow card) 53'; Obradović 72'	Report	Kamara 18'; Korobkin (yellow card) 38'; Zhangylyshbay (yellow card) 66'; Bojović (yellow card) 88'	Stadium: Central Stadium; Attendance: 11,000; Referee: Bagdat Abdullaev

26 July 2017 15	Akzhayik	2 – 2	Aktobe	Oral
18:00 (UTC+6)	A.Ersalimov 50'; Y.Pertsukh (yellow card) 57'; M.Sapanov (yellow card) 73'; D.Schmidt (yellow card) 83'; Nikolić (yellow card) 90'; Govedarica 90+5'	Report	Šimkovič 24'; Shestakov (yellow card) 73'; Zyankovich (yellow card) 77'; Nane 80'; Obradović (yellow card) 90'	Stadium: Petr Atoyan Stadium; Attendance: 2,000

30 July 2017 22	Aktobe	1 – 2	Kairat	Aktobe
21:00 (UTC+6)	Valiullin (yellow card) 2'; Shestakov (yellow card) 8' (goal) 50'; Sidelnikov (yellow card) 30'; Muarem (yellow card) 40'; Savić (yellow card) 45+2'	Report	Gohou 29' (pen.) (yellow card) 44'; Kuat (yellow card) 36'; Akhmetov (yellow card) 59'; Zhukov 78'	Stadium: Central Stadium; Attendance: 11,500; Referee: Furkat Atajanov

11 August 2017 23	Aktobe	0 – 3	Astana	Aktobe
21:00 (UTC+6)	Valiullin (yellow card) 32'; Volovyk (yellow card) 41'; B.Kairov (yellow card) 66'	Report	Zyankovich 33' (o.g.); Kabananga 51'; Muzhikov (yellow card) 65'; Grahovac 79'	Stadium: Central Stadium; Attendance: 11,000; Referee: Anatolyi Vishnichenko

19 August 2017 24	Akzhayik	2 – 2	Aktobe	Oral
19:00 (UTC+6)	Đurović 20', 57'; Nikolić (yellow card) 90+3'	Report	Obradović (yellow card) 7'; Zyankovich 47', 82' (pen.); Kolčák (yellow card) 68'	Stadium: Petr Atoyan Stadium; Attendance: 3,500; Referee: Aleksei Bobrov

26 August 2017 25	Okzhetpes	0 – 2	Aktobe	Shchuchinsk
16:00 (UTC+6)		Report	Kolčák (yellow card) 5'; Zyankovich 25'; Savić 34' (yellow card) 44'; B.Kairov (yellow card) 43'; Simović (yellow card) 60'	Stadium: Zhaksy Stadium; Attendance: 250; Referee: Timur Kumashev

10 September 2017 26	Aktobe	2 – 0	Shakhter Karagandy	Aktobe
19:00 (UTC+6)	Valiullin 52'; Obradović (yellow card) 67' (goal) 81'; A.Shurigin (yellow card) 90+1'	Report	Szöke (yellow card) 35'; Dmitrenko (yellow card) 84'	Stadium: Central Stadium; Attendance: 12,000; Referee: Aydin Rakhimbayev

16 September 2017 27	Atyrau	2 – 2	Aktobe	Atyrau
18:30 (UTC+6)	Sikimić 21'; Khairullin (yellow card) 33'; Maksimović 43'; Đokić (yellow card) 45'; Chichulin (yellow card) 60'; Salomov (yellow card) 80'	Report	Valiullin 13'; Šimkovič 30' (yellow card) 59'; Kolčák (yellow card) 56'; B.Kairov (yellow card) 85'	Stadium: Munaishy Stadium; Attendance: 3,000; Referee: Daniyar Sakhi

20 September 2017 30	Aktobe	1 – 0	Tobol	Aktobe
20:00 (UTC+6)	Nane 44'; Volovyk (yellow card) 51'	Report	Mukhutdinov (yellow card) 66'; Moldakaraev (yellow card) 71' (yellow-red card) 83'; D.Miroshnichenko (yellow card) 90+4'	Stadium: Central Stadium; Attendance: 6,500; Referee: Igor Chesnokov

24 September 2017 28	Aktobe	0 – 1	Kaisar	Aktobe
17:00 (UTC+6)	B.Kairov (yellow card) 59'; Simović (yellow card) 74'	Report	Korobkin (yellow card) 3'; M.Bayzhanov 10'; Graf (yellow card) 19'; Lamanje (yellow card) 44'; Grigorenko (yellow card) 90+4'	Stadium: Central Stadium; Attendance: 1,700; Referee: Timur Kumashev

1 October 2017 29	Taraz	1 – 0	Aktobe	Taraz
18:00 (UTC+6)	Maurice 17'; Mijušković (yellow card) 43'; Ergashev (yellow card) 47'	Report	Muarem (yellow card) 19'; Nane (yellow card) 55'	Stadium: Central Stadium; Attendance: 5,000; Referee: Marat Iskakov

21 October 2017 31	Irtysh Pavlodar	1 – 1	Aktobe	Pavlodar
15:00 (UTC+6)	Aliev (yellow card) 32'; Ohirya (yellow card) 72'; Kislitsyn (yellow card) 75'; Faug-Porret 90+7' (o.g.)	Report	Šimkovič (yellow card) 30' (goal) 90+3'; Faug-Porret (yellow card) 75'	Stadium: Central Stadium; Attendance: 2,500; Referee: Marat Iskakov

28 October 2017 32	Aktobe	2 – 0	Ordabasy	Aktobe
15:00 (UTC+6)	A.Shurigin (yellow card) 35'; Muarem 55'; Šimkovič 76'	Report		Stadium: Central Stadium; Attendance: 4,500; Referee: Daniyar Sakhi

5 November 2017 33	Kairat	3 – 2	Aktobe	Almaty
15:00 (UTC+6)	Arzo (yellow card) 32' (goal) 44'; Kuat (yellow card) 33'; Gohou 53' (yellow card) 63'; Arshavin 70'	Report	Muarem (yellow card) 33'; Savić (yellow card) 35' (goal) 60'; Kolčák (yellow card) 70'; Šimkovič 90+7'	Stadium: Central Stadium; Attendance: 14,000

==== League table ====
Pos	Team	Pld	W	D	L	GF	GA	GD	Pts	Qualification or relegation
7	Shakhter Karagandy	33	12	4	17	36	50	−14	40	
8	Atyrau (Note: Atyrau started the season with –9 points as a punishment for unpaid debts to former manager Zoran Filipović. On 24 April 2017, Atyrau had six points returned to after they cleared their debt to Filipović, with three points retained due to debts to Jonathas.)	33	10	8	15	34	54	−20	35	
9	Aktobe	33	8	9	16	38	46	−8	33	
10	Akzhayik (O)	33	7	9	17	29	47	−18	30	Qualification for the relegation play-offs
11	Taraz (Note: Taraz had six points deducted as a punishment for unpaid debts to former player Obiora Odita.) (R)	33	8	8	17	29	50	−21	26	Relegation to the Kazakhstan First Division

Source: UEFA, Soccerway
Rules for classification: 1) Points; 2) Head-to-head points; 3) Head-to-head matches won; 4) Head-to-head goal difference; 5) Head-to-head goals scored; 6) Head-to-head away goals scored; 7) Goal difference; 8) Matches won; 9) Goals scored; 10) Away goals scored; 11) Draw.
(O) Play-off winners; (R) Relegated

=== Kazakhstan Cup ===
19 April 2017 Last 16	Akzhayik	0 – 0 (4 –5 p)	Aktobe	Oral
18:00 (UTC+6)	S.Chulagov (yellow card) 9'; Rubio (yellow card) 17'; I.Antipov (yellow card) 35'; B.Omarov (yellow card) 37'	Report	Torres (yellow card) 19'; R.Rozybakiyev (yellow card) 112'	Stadium: Petr Atoyan Stadium; Attendance: 2,300; Referee: Marat Iskakov
	Penalties
	A.Shabaev (penalty scored); Y.Pertsukh (penalty scored); E.Tapalov (penalty scored); Valiullin (penalty missed); B.Omarov (penalty scored)		Juninho (penalty scored); Cassiano (penalty scored); A.Kakimov (penalty scored); Zyankovich (penalty scored); Volovyk (penalty scored)

10 May 2017 Quarterfinal	Atyrau	1 – 0 (a.e.t.)	Aktobe	Atyrau
18:30 (UTC+6)	Dvalishvili (yellow card) 18'; D.Kayralliev (yellow card) 74'; A.Nurybekov (yellow card) 104'; Rodić 119' (yellow card) 120'; E.Abdrakhmanov (yellow card) 121'	Report	A.Shurigin (yellow card) 13'; Volovyk (yellow card) 69'; A.Totay (yellow card) 80'; Gueye (yellow card) 106'	Stadium: Munaishy Stadium; Attendance: 4,000; Referee: Artyom Kuchin

== Squad statistics ==
As of match played 5 November 2017

=== Appearances and goals ===
No.	Pos	Nat	Player	Total		Premier League		Kazakhstan Cup	
No.	Pos	Nat	Player	Apps	Goals	Apps	Goals	Apps	Goals
2	DF	(Kazakhstan) KAZ	Rafkat Aslan	16	0	9+5	0	1+1	0
3	MF	(Cameroon) CMR	Joseph Nane	19	2	19	2	0	0
4	DF	(Ukraine) UKR	Oleksandr Volovyk	24	0	20+2	0	2	0
5	DF	(Kazakhstan) KAZ	Bagdat Kairov	22	0	18+3	0	1	0
7	MF	(Kazakhstan) KAZ	Bauyrzhan Baitana	23	2	11+10	2	2	0
14	DF	(Kazakhstan) KAZ	Berik Aitbayev	21	0	17+3	0	0+1	0
18	MF	(Austria) AUT	Tomáš Šimkovič	14	5	13+1	5	0	0
20	MF	(Kazakhstan) KAZ	Ardak Saulet	5	0	5	0	0	0
22	MF	(Kazakhstan) KAZ	Kirill Shestakov	26	2	25	2	1	0
24	MF	(Kazakhstan) KAZ	Ruslan Valiullin	17	2	17	2	0	0
25	DF	(Kazakhstan) KAZ	Sayat Zhumagali	10	0	7+3	0	0	0
30	DF	(Slovakia) SVK	Kristián Kolčák	15	0	15	0	0	0
31	MF	(Kazakhstan) KAZ	Abay Zhunusov	2	0	2	0	0	0
32	GK	(Kazakhstan) KAZ	Samat Otarbayev	12	0	10	0	2	0
35	DF	(France) FRA	Jérémy Faug-Porret	11	0	9+2	0	0	0
45	MF	(Serbia) SRB	Slobodan Simović	10	0	10	0	0	0
47	MF	(Kazakhstan) KAZ	Aslanbek Kakimov	24	0	13+9	0	1+1	0
50	FW	(North Macedonia) MKD	Dušan Savić	16	4	11+5	4	0	0
55	GK	(Kazakhstan) KAZ	Andrei Sidelnikov	23	0	23	0	0	0
66	MF	(Kazakhstan) KAZ	Rakhimzhan Rozybakiyev	5	0	4	0	0+1	0
77	MF	(North Macedonia) MKD	Muarem Muarem	15	1	11+4	1	0	0
86	FW	(Montenegro) MNE	Marko Obradović	14	2	2+12	2	0	0
87	FW	(Belarus) BLR	Ihar Zyankovich	32	9	21+9	9	1+1	0
88	MF	(Kazakhstan) KAZ	Anton Shurigin	17	0	12+4	0	1	0
92	MF	(Kazakhstan) KAZ	Abylaykhan Totay	8	0	0+6	0	1+1	0
95	FW	(Kazakhstan) KAZ	Abat Aimbetov	2	0	0+2	0	0	0
Players away from Aktobe on loan:
Players who left Aktobe during the season:
6	DF	(Brazil) BRA	Juninho	19	1	17	1	2	0
10	MF	(Brazil) BRA	Vitor Júnior	7	1	3+4	1	0	0
11	FW	(Brazil) BRA	Cassiano	13	1	10+2	1	1	0
12	DF	(Kazakhstan) KAZ	Damir Dautov	5	0	3+1	0	1	0
19	MF	(Argentina) ARG	Chaco Torres	7	0	5+1	0	1	0
30	DF	(Senegal) SEN	Papa Gueye	10	0	9	0	1	0
39	FW	(Brazil) BRA	Yuri Mamute	16	3	10+5	3	1	0
73	FW	(Ukraine) UKR	Oleksandr Yermachenko	7	0	3+2	0	2	0

=== Goal scorers ===
Place	Position	Nation	Number	Name	Premier League	Kazakhstan Cup	Total
1	FW	(Belarus)	87	Ihar Zyankovich	9	0	9
2	MF	(Austria)	18	Tomáš Šimkovič	5	0	5
3	FW	(Brazil)	39	Yuri Mamute	3	0	3
4	FW	(North Macedonia)	50	Dušan Savić	4	0	4
4				Own goal	3	0	3
6	MF	(Kazakhstan)	7	Bauyrzhan Baitana	2	0	2
6	MF	(Kazakhstan)	22	Kirill Shestakov	2	0	2
6	FW	(Montenegro)	86	Marko Obradović	2	0	2
6	MF	(Kazakhstan)	24	Ruslan Valiullin	2	0	2
6	MF	(Cameroon)	3	Joseph Nane	2	0	2
11	DF	(Brazil)	6	Juninho	1	0	1
11	FW	(Brazil)	11	Cassiano	1	0	1
11	MF	(Brazil)	10	Vitor Júnior	1	0	1
11	MF	(North Macedonia)	77	Muarem Muarem	1	0	1
				TOTALS	38	0	38

=== Disciplinary record ===
Number	Nation	Position	Name	Premier League		Kazakhstan Cup		Total	
Number	Nation	Position	Name	Yellow card	Red card	Yellow card	Red card	Yellow card	Red card
2	(Kazakhstan)	DF	Rafkat Aslan	4	0	0	0	4	0
3	(Cameroon)	MF	Joseph Nane	1	0	0	0	1	0
4	(Ukraine)	DF	Oleksandr Volovyk	5	0	1	0	6	0
5	(Kazakhstan)	DF	Bagdat Kairov	10	1	0	0	10	1
6	(Brazil)	DF	Juninho	1	0	0	0	1	0
7	(Kazakhstan)	MF	Bauyrzhan Baitana	3	0	0	0	3	0
10	(Brazil)	MF	Vitor Júnior	3	0	0	0	3	0
11	(Brazil)	FW	Cassiano	4	1	0	0	4	1
14	(Kazakhstan)	DF	Berik Aitbayev	1	0	0	0	1	0
18	(Austria)	MF	Tomáš Šimkovič	4	0	0	0	4	0
19	(Argentina)	MF	Chaco Torres	1	0	1	0	2	0
20	(Kazakhstan)	MF	Ardak Saulet	1	0	0	0	1	0
22	(Kazakhstan)	MF	Kirill Shestakov	7	0	0	0	7	0
24	(Kazakhstan)	MF	Ruslan Valiullin	3	0	0	0	3	0
25	(Kazakhstan)	DF	Sayat Zhumagali	2	0	0	0	2	0
30	(Senegal)	DF	Papa Gueye	0	1	1	0	1	1
30	(Slovakia)	DF	Kristián Kolčák	4	0	0	0	4	0
35	(France)	DF	Jérémy Faug-Porret	1	0	0	0	1	0
39	(Brazil)	FW	Yuri Mamute	5	0	0	0	5	0
45	(Serbia)	MF	Slobodan Simović	2	0	0	0	2	0
50	(North Macedonia)	FW	Dušan Savić	4	0	0	0	4	0
55	(Kazakhstan)	GK	Andrei Sidelnikov	1	0	0	0	1	0
66	(Kazakhstan)	MF	Rakhimzhan Rozybakiyev	1	0	1	0	2	0
77	(North Macedonia)	MF	Muarem Muarem	3	0	0	0	3	0
86	(Montenegro)	FW	Marko Obradović	3	0	0	0	3	0
87	(Belarus)	FW	Ihar Zyankovich	3	0	0	0	3	0
88	(Kazakhstan)	MF	Anton Shurigin	4	0	1	0	5	0
92	(Kazakhstan)	MF	Abylaykhan Totay	0	0	1	0	1	0
			TOTALS	81	3	6	0	87	3
