= Chaco Torres =

Argentine footballer (born 1985)

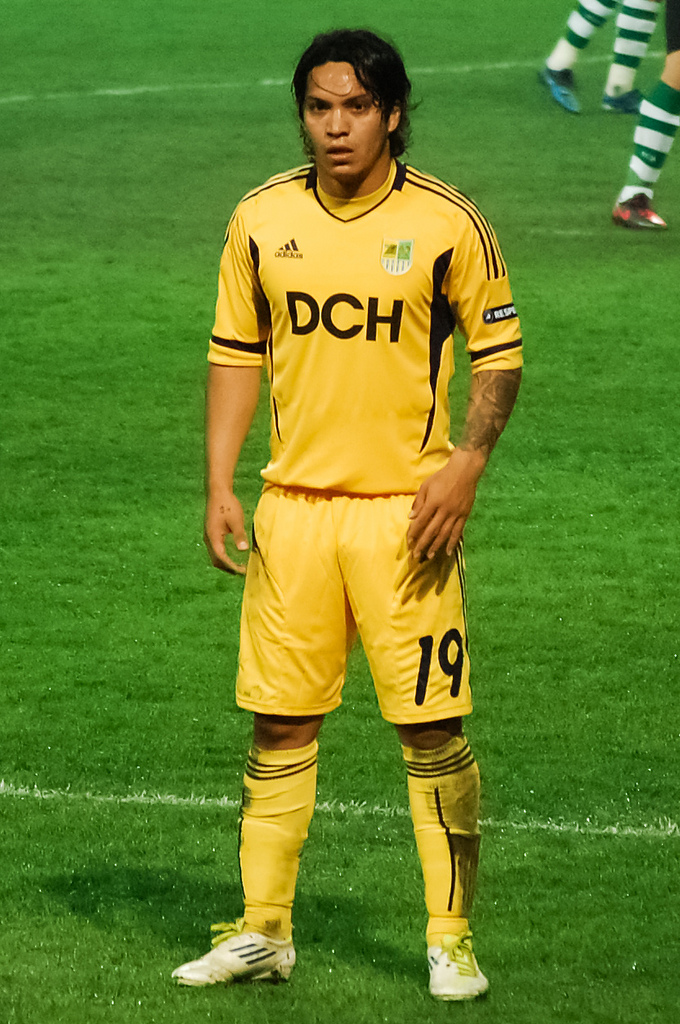

Personal information
- Full name: Juan Manuel Torres
- Date of birth: June 20, 1985 (age 41)
- Place of birth: Puerto Vilelas, Argentina
- Height: 1.71 m (5 ft 7 in)
- Position: Defensive midfielder

Senior career*
Years	Team	Apps	(Gls)
2002–2006	Racing Club	104	(0)
2007–2011	San Lorenzo	101	(2)
2011–2014	Metalist Kharkiv	46	(1)
2015	Atletico Defensores de Vilelas		
2016	Chaco For Ever	5	(0)
2016	Chacarita Juniors	0	(0)
2017	Aktobe	6	(0)

International career
2005	Argentina U20	14	(0)
- * Club domestic league appearances and goals as of 15 June 2017

Juan Manuel "Chaco" Torres (born 20 June 1985), is a retired Argentine football midfielder.

== Career ==
Former player of Argentine clubs Racing Club and San Lorenzo de Almagro (Buenos Aires), Torres made his professional debut in 2002 in the age of 17, he went on to make over 100 appearances for each of the Argentine club.

Torres was part of the Argentina U-20 team, along with such players as Lionel Messi, Sergio Agüero and Pablo Zabaleta, that won the 2005 FIFA World Youth Championship.

In summer 2005, the management of Dynamo Kyiv attempted to buy the young and promising FIFA World Youth Champion Juan Manuel Torres Racing Club. However, the Racing Club management were not as eager to release one of their key players, although the Torres was expressing a desire for leaving. Inter alia, the parties could not agree on money issues.

On June 24, 2011, he signed a three-year contract with Metalist Kharkiv as a free agent. Both times Chaco moved to a new club, on a free transfer (as a free agent). He offered his services to Metalist Kharkiv, at the time being out of contract.

=== Aktobe ===
In January 2017, Torres signed for Kazakhstan Premier League side FC Aktobe, leaving the club by mutual consent on 15 June 2017.

== Career statistics ==
As of match played 30 November 2014

Appearances and goals by club, season and competition
Club	Season	League			National Cup		League Cup		Continental		Other		Total	
Club	Season	Division	Apps	Goals	Apps	Goals	Apps	Goals	Apps	Goals	Apps	Goals	Apps	Goals
Metalist Kharkiv	2011–12	Ukrainian Premier League	18	0	2	0	-		11	0	-		31	0
Metalist Kharkiv	2012–13	Ukrainian Premier League	17	1	1	0	-		10	1	-		28	2
Metalist Kharkiv	2013–14	Ukrainian Premier League	2	0	0	0	-		1	0	-		3	0
Metalist Kharkiv	2014–15	Ukrainian Premier League	9	0	2	0	-		3	0	-		14	0
Metalist Kharkiv	Total		46	1	5	0	-	-	25	1	-	-	76	2
Aktobe	2017	Kazakhstan Premier League	6	0	1	0	–		–		–		7	0
Career total			52	1	6	0	-	-	25	1	-	-	83	2

== Honours ==
=== Country ===
Argentina U-20

- FIFA World Youth Champion (1): 2005

== Personal life ==
Torres has two children: a daughter with his first wife Ailyn Lobato, and a son with the actress Catalina Artusi. In September 2012, the Argentine fashion model Ivanna Palliotti left Buenos Aires and moved to Kharkiv for her boyfriend, the player of Metalist Kharkiv Chaco Torres.

Chaco is the nickname given to him, because he was born in the Argentine province of Chaco.
