= Muarem Muarem =

Macedonian association footballer (born 1988)

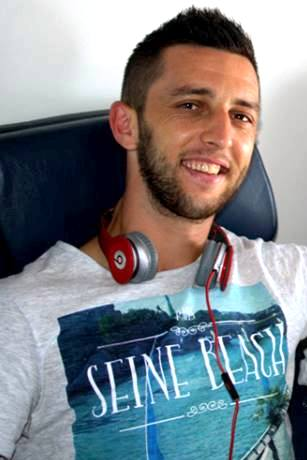

Personal information
- Full name: Ramiz Muarem Muarem
- Date of birth: 22 October 1988 (age 38)
- Place of birth: Skopje, SR Macedonia, SFR Yugoslavia
- Height: 5 ft 11 in (1.80 m)
- Position: Attacking midfielder

Youth career
- 2004–2008: Rabotnički

Senior career*
Years	Team	Apps	(Gls)
2008–2010	Rabotnički	24	(0)
2009–2010	→ Teteks (loan)	4	(0)
2010–2011	Orduspor	25	(4)
2011–2012	Rabotnički	16	(2)
2012–2015	Qarabağ	99	(17)
2015–2016	Eskişehirspor	1	(0)
2016–2017	Qarabağ	37	(7)
2017–2018	Aktobe	15	(1)
2018	Flamurtari Vlorë	11	(2)
2018	Shkupi	0	(0)

International career^{‡}
2004–2006	North Macedonia U17	3	(0)
2006–2007	North Macedonia U19	3	(0)
2009–2010	North Macedonia U21	11	(4)
2011–2015	North Macedonia	7	(0)
- * Club domestic league appearances and goals as of 9 February 2018 ‡ National team caps and goals as of 14 June 2015

Ramiz Muarem Muarem (Macedonian: Рамиз Муарем Муарем; born 22 October 1988) is a Macedonian association footballer. Muarem plays as a midfielder. He most recently played for the Macedonian First Football League side Shkupi and has played for Qarabağ in Azerbaijan, Eskişehirspor, Orduspor in Turkey and FK Rabotnički in North Macedonia at club level as well as the North Macedonia national football team, for whom he has three caps, all won in 2011. He has also represented Macedonia at under-17, under-19 and under-21 level. Muarem is right-footed.

== Club career ==
=== Rabotnicki Skopje ===
Born in Skopje to Turkish parents, Muarem spent his youth career with Rabotnicki Skopje, turning professional in the 2008–09 season and making four appearances for the first team. He made his debut for the club in a 0–0 draw with Azerbaijan's Inter Baku on 15 July 2008 in a 2008-09 UEFA Champions League qualifier, being brought on after 50 minutes by manager Boban Babunski.

The midfielder had a short loan spell at lower–league Macedonian club FK Teteks, playing four games. Muarem then became a regular fixture in the first team, playing twenty times in 2009–2010 in the Macedonian First League as well as competing in Europe against Mika FC of Armenia and FC Lusitanos of Andorra, scoring against the latter in a 5–0 win on 1 July 2010. Despite this success at Rabotnicki in such a short amount of time, Muarem moved on to Orduspor in Turkey.

=== Orduspor ===
Muarem moved to TFF First League outfit Orduspor ahead of the 2010–11 season, signing a contract on 18 August 2010 that was designed to keep him at the club until May 2013. Muarem made his debut for Orduspor just three days after signing for them, in a 1–1 draw with Kayseri Erciyesspor. Muarem scored a brace for his new club on just his third Orduspor appearance, opening and finishing the scoring in a 4–0 win over İstanbul Güngörenspor on 11 September. The midfielder also scored against Altay Izmir in a 2–1 loss and against Boluspor in a 2–1 win in October 2010.

He regularly played under the manager who had signed him, Uğur Tütüneker, but when Tütüneker resigned in March 2011, Muarem's appearances became few and far between. He played just twice in April and once in May under new manager Metin Diyadin and it was no surprise when Muarem's contract with Orduspor was cancelled and he returned to Rabotnicki. Muarem made his last appearance for Orduspor in a 1–0 away victory against Denizlispor on 15 May 2011. He wore the no.19 shirt for the club.

=== Return to Rabotnicki ===
After being made a free agent due to his contract with Orduspor being terminated, Muarem had offers from former club Rabotnicki Skopje and Azerbaijani side AZAL PFC. He chose to return to the city of his birth, signing a two-year contract in August 2011. Muarem made his second debut for Rabotnicki in a 1–0 loss at FK Vardar on 9 August 2011. He then played in both legs of Rabotnicki's 9–1 aggregate loss to S.S. Lazio in the UEFA Europa League, being replaced in the second half of both games. Muarem scored his first goals since returning to Rabotnicki against FK Napredok on 24 September 2011, netting his team's first and last goals in a 4–0 win. The midfielder made his final appearance for Rabotnicki in a 1–1 draw with FK Teteks on 10 December 2011.

=== Qarabağ ===
In February 2012 it was announced that Muarem had joined Azerbaijan Premier League club FK Qarabağ, signing a three–and–a–half year contract. Muarem joined fellow Macedonian Nderim Nedzipi at the club. Upon joining Qarabağ, Muarem stated that he was pleased to have signed for the club as he enjoyed the team's style of play. Although initially expected to make his debut for Qarabağ on 10 February 2012, bad weather postponed his first appearance until 15 February, when he came on as a second–half substitute for Bakhtiyar Soltanov in a 3–0 away win at FC Baku. Muarem made his home debut on 20 February 2012 in a 1–0 win over Kapaz PFC, again coming on as a late replacement for Bakhtiyar Soltanov. The midfielder's first goal for the club came in an Azerbaijan Cup match away to Gabala FC on 14 March 2012. After replacing Rashad Sadiqov with fifteen minutes of the match remaining, Muarem scored a last-minute equaliser to earn Qarabağ a 2–2 draw.

A month later Muarem scored his first league goal for Qarabağ, netting a late consolation in a 4–2 loss to FC Baku on 22 April 2012. He played the full ninety minutes of Qarabağ's 4–1 loss to Khazar Lankaran on 11 May 2012 in the club's final game of the season. Qarabağ eventually finished fourth in the Azerbaijan Premier League.

Muarem scored in the opening game of the 2012-13 season, netting Qarabağ's goal in a 1–1 draw with Inter Baku on 5 August 2012. He was also in target in his third league appearance of the season, scoring Qarabağ's fourth goal in a 6–1 rout at Sumgayit PFC on 19 August. Muarem had to wait until 31 October for his next league goal; his consolation only served to reduce the deficit in Qarabağ's 2–1 loss to Gabala FC. He then scored in Qarabağ's next league game, netting the team's first goal in a 2–0 win over AZAL PFC on 4 November 2012. He had to wait six months for his next league goal, which arrived in a 3–1 win over FC Baku on 14 May 2013.

On 23 October 2014 the midfielder scored the winner in Qarabag's 1–0 victory against Dnipro Dnipropetrovsk in the Europa League.

=== Eskişehirspor ===
On 5 June 2015, Muarem signed a three-year contract with Turkish Süper Lig side Eskişehirspor. On 20 November 2015, Muarem left Eskişehirspor after his contract was cancelled by mutual consent.

=== Return to Qarabağ ===
On 7 January 2016, Muarem signed a 2 1/2-year contract with Azerbaijan Premier League club Qarabağ.

=== Aktobe ===
On 7 July 2017, Muarem signed with Kazakhstan Premier League club Aktober.

=== Flamurtari Vlorë ===
On 11 December 2017. Muarem signed Albanian Superliga side Flamurtari Vlorë.

== International career ==
=== Youth teams ===
Muarem played three times for Macedonia under-17, making his debut in a 4–1 loss to Georgia on 20 September 2004. He then racked up another three appearances for Macedonia under-19 before moving on to the under-21 team.

The midfielder made his debut for the under-21s against England on 4 September 2009 in a 2–1 loss. He went on to make nine appearances for the team, scoring his first international goal in his second under-21 appearance, a 1–1 draw with Lithuania on 9 September 2009, scoring in the first minute of the match. He scored his second goal a month later against England, netting a low free-kick that brought his team back into the game at 2–1. He also scored against Portugal and Bosnia and Herzegovina. Muarem played his final game for the under-21s in the 2–1 loss to Greece on 4 September 2010.

=== Senior team ===
Despite being born in Skopje, Muarem is of Turkish descent and was eligible to play for the Turkey national team before he represented Macedonia at senior level.

Muarem made his senior debut for Macedonia under manager John Toshack in a 1–0 loss to Russia on 2 September 2011 in a UEFA Euro 2012 qualifier, coming on as an 85th-minute substitute for Veliče Šumulikoski. He then made his second international appearance in the 1–0 victory against Andorra on 6 September, being booked in the first half and substituted in the 77th minute. Muarem earned his third cap for Macedonia in the 4–1 loss to Armenia on 7 October 2011. He was substituted at half-time.

Following Goran Popov's injury and Mario Gjurovski's withdrawal, Muarem was named as a late addition to Macedonia's squad for friendlies against Portugal and Angola. He failed to feature against Portugal in a 0–0 draw on 26 May 2012, but came on for Agim Ibraimi in injury time in the 0–0 stalemate with Angola three days later.

== Career statistics ==
=== Club ===
As of 11 December 2017

Appearances and goals by club, season and competition
Club	Season	League			National Cup		Continental		Other		Total	
Club	Season	Division	Apps	Goals	Apps	Goals	Apps	Goals	Apps	Goals	Apps	Goals
Rabotnički	2008–09	1. MFL	4	0	—		2	0	—		6	0
Rabotnički	2009–10	1. MFL	20	0	—		3	0	—		23	0
Rabotnički	2010–11	1. MFL	0	0	—		2	4	—		4	0
Rabotnički	Total		24	0	—	—	9	0	—	—	33	0
Teteks (loan)	2009–10	1. MFL	4	0	—						4	0
Orduspor	2010–11	TFF First League	25	4	1	0	—				26	4
Rabotnički	2011–12	1. MFL	16	2	2	0	2	0	—		20	2
Qarabağ	2011–12	Azerbaijan Premier League	14	1	3	1	0	0	—		17	2
Qarabağ	2012–13	Azerbaijan Premier League	29	5	4	0	—				33	5
Qarabağ	2013–14	Azerbaijan Premier League	27	4	3	0	4	0	—		34	4
Qarabağ	2014–15	Azerbaijan Premier League	29	7	5	1	9	2	—		43	10
Qarabağ	Total		99	17	15	2	13	2	—	—	127	21
Eskişehirspor	2015–16	Süper Lig	1	0	1	0	—				2	0
Qarabağ	2015–16	Azerbaijan Premier League	14	2	4	2	0	0	—		18	4
Qarabağ	2016–17	Azerbaijan Premier League	23	4	5	1	12	2	—		40	7
Qarabağ	Total		37	6	9	3	12	2	—	—	58	11
Aktobe	2017	Kazakhstan Premier League	15	1	0	0	—				15	1
Aktobe	Total		15	1	0	0	0	0	0	0	15	1
Flamurtari Vlorë	2017–18	Albanian Superliga	0	0	0	0	0	0	0	0	0	0
Career total			221	30	28	5	36	4	—	—	285	39

== Honors ==
=== Club ===
Qarabağ FK

- Azerbaijan Premier League (4): 2013–14, 2014–15, 2015–16, 2016–17
- Azerbaijan Cup (2): 2014–15, 2015–16
