= Ulrich Kapolongo =

Congolese footballer

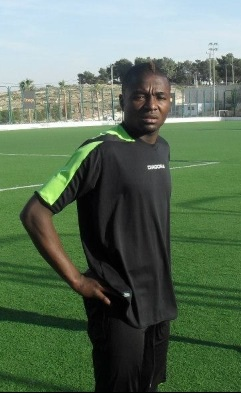
- Kapolongo with Shabab Al-Ordon in 2013

Personal information
- Full name: Ulrich Darmel Kapolongo Zaolo Desuza
- Date of birth: July 31, 1989 (age 37)
- Place of birth: Brazzaville, Congo
- Height: 1.80 m (5 ft 11 in)
- Position: Striker

Senior career*
Years	Team	Apps	(Gls)
2005–2008	ACNFF	?	(?)
2008–2009	CARA Brazzaville	19	(27)
2009–2013	Shabab Al-Ordon	42	(25)
2013–2014	Qarabağ	12	(3)
2014–2016	Teplice	28	(2)
2018–2019	Shabab Al-Ordon	20	(11)
2019–2020	Al-Khaleej	18	(5)

International career
2009–2019	Congo	6	(2)
- * Club domestic league appearances and goals as of 4 January 2017

Ulrich Darmel Kapolongo Zaolo Desuza (born 31 July 1989) is a Congolese football player who last played for Al-Khaleej as a striker. He has been capped by Congo at international level.

== Club career ==
=== Qarabağ ===
In July 2013 Kapolongo signed for Azerbaijan Premier League side Qarabağ from Jordan Premier League side Shabab Al-Ordon on a two-year contract.

Kapolongo made his debut for Qarabağ in the UEFA Europa League 1st Qualifying round 2nd leg match against Metalurg Skopje. coming on as a second-half substitute for Nikoloz Gelashvili. His first goal for Qarabağ came two games later, again in the Europa League, in extra time against Piast Gliwice. Kapolongo secured a 2-2 draw for Qarabağ which meant they went through as 4-3 winners to the 3rd qualifying round. Kapolongo went on to make his league debut on 11 August 2013 in a 5-1 victory over Sumgayit, again coming on as a second-half substitute for Gelashvili.

=== FK Teplice ===
On 25 July 2014, Kapolongo signed for Czech First League team FK Teplice.

== International career ==
Kapolongo made his national team debut on 27 March 2011 against Ghana in a 2012 Africa Cup of Nations qualification, coming on as a substitute for Jean-Claude Mpassy. Kapolongo then had to wait two-years for his second cap, which came on 14 August 2013 against Tunisia in a 3-0 friendly defeat in which Kapolongo was replaced by Dzon Delarge in the 77th minute. His first goal for The Congo came on 7 September 2013, his third game for his country, in the 2014 FIFA World Cup qualification match against Niger.

== Career statistics ==
=== Club ===
As of 5 March 2016

Appearances and goals by club, season and competition
Club	Season	League			National Cup		League Cup		Continental		Other		Total	
Club	Season	Division	Apps	Goals	Apps	Goals	Apps	Goals	Apps	Goals	Apps	Goals	Apps	Goals
Qarabağ	2013–14	Azerbaijan Premier League	12	2	2	0	—		7	1	—		21	3
Teplice	2014–15	Czech First League	16	1	5	1	–		–		–		21	2
Teplice	2015–16	Czech First League	12	0	1	0	–		4	1	–		13	0
Teplice	Total		28	1	6	1	-	-	-	-	-	-	34	2
Career total			40	3	8	1	-	-	7	1	-	-	55	5

=== International ===
Appearances and goals by national team and year
National team	Year	Apps	Goals
Congo	2009	2	1
Congo	2010	–	
Congo	2011	1	0
Congo	2012	–	
Congo	2013	2	1
Congo	2014	–	
Congo	2015	–	
Congo	2016	–	
Congo	2017	–	
Congo	2018	–	
Congo	2019	1	0
Total		6	2

Scores and results list Congo's goal tally first, score column indicates score after each Kapolongo goal.

List of international goals scored by Ulrich Kapolongo
No.	Date	Venue	Opponent	Score	Result	Competition
1	31 May 2009	Bahrain National Stadium, Riffa, Bahrain	Bahrain	1–1	1–3	Friendly
2	7 September 2013	Stade Général Seyni Kountché, Niamey, Niger	Niger	2–2	2–2	2014 FIFA World Cup qualification

=== International goals ===
Scores and results list Congo's goal tally first.

#	Date	Venue	Opponent	Score	Result	Competition
1	7 September 2013	Stade Général Seyni Kountché, Niamey, Niger	Niger	2–2	2–2	2014 FIFA World Cup qualification

== Honours ==
=== Club ===
Shabab Al-Ordon

- Jordan Premier League (1) - 2012–13

Qarabağ

- Azerbaijan Premier League (1) - 2013–14
