= Reynaldo (footballer, born 1989) =

Brazilian footballer

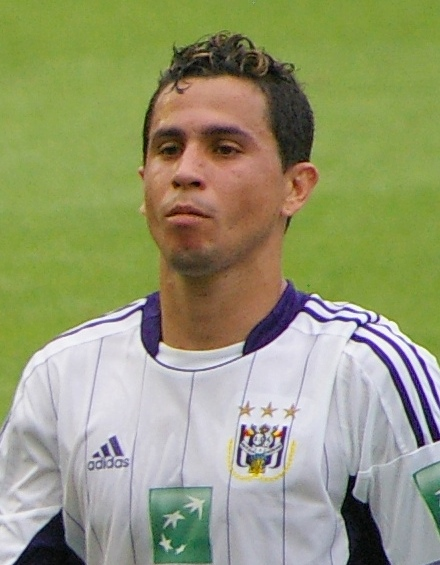
- Reynaldo dos Santos Silva after a football match

Personal information
- Full name: Reynaldo dos Santos Silva
- Date of birth: 24 August 1989 (age 37)
- Place of birth: Arapiraca, Brazil
- Height: 1.73 m (5 ft 8 in)
- Position: Forward

Youth career
- Sport Recife

Senior career*
Years	Team	Apps	(Gls)
2007–2008	Náutico	7	(0)
2008–2013	Anderlecht	5	(0)
2009–2011	→ Cercle Brugge (loan)	48	(11)
2011–2012	→ Westerlo (loan)	14	(8)
2013–2017	Qarabağ	87	(43)
2017	Adanaspor	9	(0)
2018	Spartak Trnava	0	(0)
2018	Aktobe	30	(7)
2018-2019	Qarabağ	6	(1)
2019	Irtysh Pavlodar	1	(0)
2020	Dinamo Batumi	6	(1)
Total		213	(71)
- * Club domestic league appearances and goals

Reynaldo dos Santos Silva (born 24 August 1989), known as just Reynaldo, is a Brazilian retired professional footballer who played as a forward.

== Career ==
Reynaldo began his career in the youth from Sport Recife, before signing with Náutico in 2007. He left Náutico after one year and moved to Belgian club Anderlecht in summer 2008. He left Anderlecht in January 2010 to sign a loan deal with Cercle Brugge, until 30 June 2010, which was later extended for another season. Reynaldo stayed with Anderlecht during the first half of the 2011–12 season, but was then loaned out again to Westerlo for the second part of the season. In February 2013 Reynaldo joined Qarabağ of the Azerbaijan Premier League.

On 27 January 2017, Reynaldo signed a 2.5-year contract with Süper Lig side Adanaspor.

On 10 January 2018, Reynaldo signed for Spartak Trnava until the end of the 2017–18 season, however on 1 February 2018, his contract was cancelled by mutual consent. On 27 February 2018, Aktobe announced the signing of Reynaldo.

On 19 December 2018, Qarabağ announced the return of Reynaldo on a 2 1/2-year contract, but was released early from his contract by mutual consent on 13 May 2019.

On 4 July 2019, Reynaldo signed for Irtysh Pavlodar. Less than twenty days later, 23 July 2019, Reynaldo left Irtysh Pavlodar by mutual consent.

After a spell at Dinamo Batumi in Georgia, Reynaldo announced his retirement on 28 January 2021.

== Career statistics ==
Appearances and goals by club, season and competition
Club	Season	League			National cup		League cup		Continental		Other		Total	
Club	Season	Division	Apps	Goals	Apps	Goals	Apps	Goals	Apps	Goals	Apps	Goals	Apps	Goals
Anderlecht	2009–10	Belgian Pro League	3	0	1	0	—		2	0	—		6	0
Anderlecht	2010–11	Belgian Pro League	0	0	0	0	—		—		—		0	0
Anderlecht	2011–12	Belgian Pro League	1	0	1	0	—		—		—		2	0
Anderlecht	2012–13	Belgian Pro League	1	0	1	0	—		—		—		2	0
Anderlecht	Total		5	0	3	0	0	0	2	0	0	0	10	0
Cercle Brugge (loan)	2009–10	Belgian Pro League	15	4	4	0	–		–		–		19	4
Cercle Brugge (loan)	2010–11	Belgian Pro League	33	7	5	2	–		4	1	–		42	10
Cercle Brugge (loan)	Total		48	11	9	2	0	0	4	1	0	0	61	14
Westerlo (loan)	2011–12	Belgian Pro League	13	8	6	1	–		–		–		19	9
Qarabağ	2012–13	Azerbaijan Premier League	9	2	3	0	—		—		—		12	2
Qarabağ	2013–14	Azerbaijan Premier League	31	22	2	2	—		7	5	—		40	29
Qarabağ	2014–15	Azerbaijan Premier League	23	10	4	4	—		9	2	—		36	16
Qarabağ	2015–16	Azerbaijan Premier League	14	5	2	1	—		8	2	—		24	8
Qarabağ	2016–17	Azerbaijan Premier League	10	4	0	0	—		11	2	—		21	6
Qarabağ	Total		87	43	8	7	0	0	35	11	0	0	133	61
Adanaspor	2016–17	Süper Lig	9	0	0	0	–		–		–		9	0
Adanaspor	2017–18	Süper Lig	0	0	0	0	–		–		–		0	0
Adanaspor	Total		9	0	0	0	0	0	0	0	0	0	9	0
Spartak Trnava	2017–18	Fortuna Liga	0	0	0	0	–		–		–		0	0
Aktobe	2018	Kazakhstan Premier League	30	7	1	0	–		–		–		31	7
Qarabağ	2018–19	Azerbaijan Premier League	5	1	1	0	–		0	0	–		6	1
Irtysh Pavlodar	2019	Kazakhstan Premier League	1	0	0	0	–		–		–		1	0
Dinamo Batumi	2020	Erovnuli Liga	6	1	1	0	–		1	0	–		8	1
Career total			204	71	29	10	0	0	42	12	0	0	275	93

== Honors ==
Anderlecht

- Belgian Pro League: 2009–10, 2011–12

Qarabağ

- Azerbaijan Premier League: 2013–14, 2014–15, 2015–16, 2018–19
- Azerbaijan Cup: 2014–15, 2015–16

Individual

- Azerbaijan Premier League top goalscorer: 2013–14
