= Rydell Poepon =

Dutch footballer (born 1987)

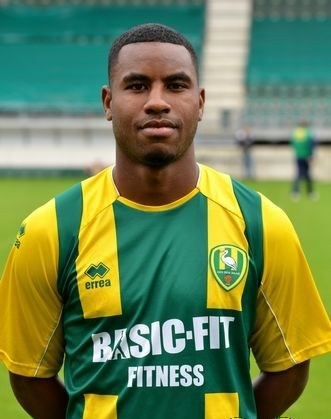
- Poepon with ADO Den Haag in 2012

Personal information
- Full name: Rydell Romano Poepon
- Date of birth: 28 August 1987 (age 39)
- Place of birth: Amsterdam, Netherlands
- Height: 1.81 m (5 ft 11 in)
- Position: Striker

Team information
- Current team: DWS

Youth career
- 1994–1996: AFC
- 1996–2001: Fortius
- 2001–2004: Zeeburgia
- 2004–2006: Ajax

Senior career*
| Years | Team | Apps | (Gls) |
| 2006–2008 | Ajax | 0 | (0) |
| 2006–2008 | → Willem II (loan) | 41 | (10) |
| 2008–2010 | Sparta Rotterdam | 64 | (19) |
| 2010–2012 | De Graafschap | 65 | (19) |
| 2012–2014 | ADO Den Haag | 27 | (3) |
| 2013–2014 | → NAC Breda (loan) | 29 | (9) |
| 2014–2015 | Valenciennes | 34 | (7) |
| 2015–2016 | Qarabağ | 15 | (1) |
| 2016 | Roda JC | 17 | (4) |
| 2016–2018 | Boluspor | 67 | (36) |
| 2018–2019 | Gazişehir Gaziantep | 29 | (9) |
| 2019–2021 | Boluspor | 36 | (6) |
| 2021–2022 | IJsselmeervogels | 19 | (3) |
| 2022–2023 | Ajax Amateurs | | |
| 2023– | DWS | | |

International career
| 2005–2006 | Netherlands U19 | 4 | (1) |
| 2007 | Netherlands U20 | 4 | (1) |
| 2007 | Netherlands U21 | 2 | (0) |
| 2009 | Netherlands B | 2 | (0) |
- * Club domestic league appearances and goals as of 1 July 2022

Rydell Romano Poepon (born 28 August 1987) is a Dutch professional footballer who plays as a striker for Derde Klasse club DWS.

An academy graduate of Ajax, Poepon made his senior debut for Willem II in 2007. The following years brought him to several clubs in the lower table of the Eredivisie, including Sparta Rotterdam, ADO Den Haag and NAC Breda. Apart from a six-month stay at Roda JC Kerkrade, Poepon would spend the next years abroad in France, Azerbaijan and Turkey, experiencing his most successful period at second-tier TFF First League club Boluspor.

Poepon is a former Netherlands youth international, having gained two caps for the Netherlands U21 team in 2007.

== Club career ==
Poepon played in the youth departments of AFC, ASV Fortius and Zeeburgia until he was included in the youth academy of Ajax. He progressed through the youth ranks there, but never made an appearance for their senior team. He was sent on loan to Willem II in January 2006. After six months, Poepon returned to Ajax without having scored for the club in eight appearances. Willem II subsequently again showed interest in loaning him. Ajax agreed, after Poepon's contract was extended for four years. His first league goal came in November 2007, at home against Utrecht in a 1–4 defeat. He then scored a brace against Excelsior and scored a hat-trick at home against NEC. At the end of the season, he had scored 10 goals in 32 league appearances in his first full season of his career.

Despite Willem II showing interest in taking over Poepon from Ajax on a permanent deal, he chose to sign for Sparta Rotterdam on a three-year contract in May 2008. In his first season, he scored nine goals in 31 games. The club nevertheless suffered relegation to the second-tier Eerste Divisie after two consecutive seasons in the Eredivisie. In his last season in Rotterdam, Poepon scored ten goals in 33 games. After Sparta's relegation to the Eerste Divisie in 2010, he moved to De Graafschap on a three-year contract, after the club had recently achieved promotion to the top tier.

After suffering relegation with De Graafschap, Poepon signed a two-year contract with an option for an additional year with ADO Den Haag in June 2012. Poepon moved abroad for the first time in his career after signing with French Ligue 2 club Valenciennes in August 2014. He made 35 appearances in the second tier in which he scored seven goals. After the season, his contract was terminated by mutual consent. In July 2015, Poepon signed a two-year deal with Azerbaijan Premier League club Qarabağ. After 15 league appearances in which he only scored one goal, his contract was dissolved in December 2015, after he found out through media reports that the club wanted to part ways with him.

Poepon signed a six-month contract with Roda JC Kerkrade in January 2016, with an option for another year. He made his debut against AZ in a 0–1 home loss and scored four goals in 17 league matches for the club. At the end of the season, Roda did not trigger the option in his contract, effectively making him a free agent. In June 2016, Poepon signed a two-year contract with Turkish second-tier TFF First League club Boluspor. There, he was joined by fellow Dutch players Mitchell te Vrede and Anco Jansen and was coached by Fuat Çapa with a background in Dutch football. In June 2018, Poepon moved to Gazişehir Gaziantep, before returning to Boluspor one year later, in August 2019. In May 2021, his contract with the club was terminated by mutual consent.

On 31 August 2021, Poepon signed a one-year contract with Tweede Divisie club IJsselmeervogels.

== International career ==
Foppe de Haan included Poepon for the first time in the squad for the Netherlands U21 on 17 August 2007. On 22 August, he made his debut, in a 2009 UEFA European Under-21 Championship qualifier against Macedonia.

== Personal life ==
Born in the Netherlands, Poepon is of Surinamese descent.
