= Vladimir Dimitrovski =

Macedonian footballer

Personal information
- Full name: Vladimir Dimitrovski
- Date of birth: 30 November 1988 (age 37)
- Place of birth: Skopje, SFR Yugoslavia
- Height: 1.87 m (6 ft 2 in)
- Position: Centre back

Team information
- Current team: Niki Volos (assistant coach)

Senior career*
Years	Team	Apps	(Gls)
2006	Vardar	4	(0)
2006–2007	Westerlo	20	(0)
2008–2009	Cementarnica	32	(2)
2009	Croatia Sesvete	10	(0)
2009–2010	Metalurg Skopje	18	(1)
2010–2012	Mladá Boleslav	25	(1)
2012–2013	Rabotnichki	13	(0)
2013–2014	Vardar	33	(1)
2014–2015	Kerkyra	27	(1)
2015	Qarabağ	3	(0)
2016	Teplice	0	(0)
2016–2017	Kerkyra	17	(0)
2017–2018	Doxa Drama	19	(0)
2018–2019	Rabotnichki	24	(1)
2020–2021	Telavi	10	(1)
2022–2023	Grindavík	14	(0)
2023	Asteras Petriti		

International career
2005–2010	Macedonia U-21	19	(0)
2011–2015	Macedonia	4	(0)

Managerial career
- 2023: Kalamata (assistant coach)
- 2026–: Niki Volos (assistant coach)
- * Club domestic league appearances and goals

Vladimir Dimitrovski (Macedonian: Владимир Димитровски; born 30 November 1988) is a Macedonian retired footballer, and is the current assistant coach of Super League 2 club Niki Volos. This young hope started his career in the all-time best Macedonian club, Vardar Skopje and then played for Cementarnica, Westerlo in Belgium and NK Croatia Sesvete. He also played for FK Metalurg Skopje in Macedonia before he signed with his current team and has been the captain of the U-21 national team of Macedonia for three years.

== Club career ==
=== Early years ===
After starting out with the hometown side Vardar Skopje, Dimitrovski's extraordinary talent was noticed by KVC Westerlo in 2006 and he made a switch at still only 17 years of age. He spent the next year and a half season in Westerlo where he further raised his level and became the Macedonian U21 team captain.

He signed with his current team, Mladá Boleslav, on 7 July 2010.

In January 2016, Dimitrovski signed for Czech First League side FK Teplice.

== International career ==
Dimitrovski has been an important part of Macedonia under-21 squad on the last two European U-21 championships.

He made his senior debut for Macedonia in an August 2011 friendly match against Azerbaijan and has earned a total of 4 caps, scoring no goals. His final international was a June 2015 European Championship qualification match against Slovakia.

== Career statistics ==
Season	Club	Competition	Apps	Goals
07/2010 – 07/2012	Mladá Boleslav	Gambrinus liga	25	1
07/2009 – 07/2010	Metalurg Skopje	First Macedonian Football League	18	1
01/2009 – 06/2009	Croatia Sesvete	1. HNL	10	0
01/2008 – 12/2008	Cementarnica	First Macedonian Football League	32	2
01/2007 – 12/2007	KVC Westerlo	Belgian Pro League	20	0
01/2006 – 12/2006	Vardar	First Macedonian Football League	4	0
Total			97	5
