= Vitor Júnior =

Brazilian footballer

Vítor Júnior
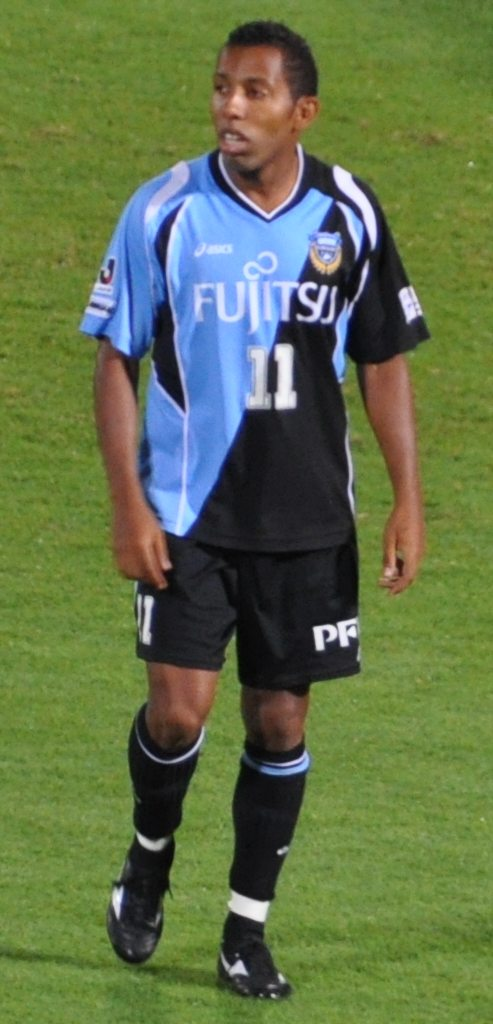

Personal information
- Full name: Vitor Silva Assis de Oliveira Júnior
- Date of birth: September 15, 1986 (age 40)
- Place of birth: Porto Alegre, Brazil
- Height: 1.70 m (5 ft 7 in)
- Position: Attacking midfielder

Team information
- Current team: Inter de Santa Maria

Youth career
- 2004–2005: Internacional

Senior career*
Years	Team	Apps	(Gls)
2005	Internacional	3	(0)
2005	→ Cruzeiro (loan)	6	(0)
2006	Dinamo Zagreb	5	(0)
2006	→ Koper (loan)	33	(4)
2007	Sport Recife	5	(1)
2007	Santos	27	(2)
2008–2010	Kawasaki Frontale	57	(12)
2011	Atlético Goianiense	30	(4)
2012–2015	Corinthians	7	(0)
2012	→ Botafogo (loan)	24	(4)
2013	→ Internacional (loan)	12	(1)
2013	→ Coritiba (loan)	12	(2)
2014	→ Figueirense (loan)	17	(0)
2015	→ Siam Navy (loan)	11	(3)
2016–2017	Al-Qadisiyah	12	(1)
2017	Aktobe	7	(1)
2017	ABC	5	(1)
2018	Navy	29	(6)
2019	Brusque	5	(0)
2020	Villa Nova	6	(1)
2020	São José	14	(0)
2021	America-RJ	6	(0)
2021	Jataiense	5	(0)
2021–2022	Al-Najma SC	?	(?)
2023	Paranoá	8	(0)
2023	Pelotas	8	(0)
2024	Castanhal	8	(0)
2024	Pelotas	15	(2)
2024	Sobradinho	8	(0)
2025	Avenida	2	(0)
2025–	Inter de Santa Maria	24	(1)
- * Club domestic league appearances and goals as of 17:02, 2 January 2021 (UTC)

Vítor Silva Assis de Oliveira Jr. known as Vítor Júnior or just Júnior (born September 15, 1986 in Porto Alegre), is a Brazilian attacking midfielder who plays for Inter de Santa Maria.

He also known as Júnior Juninho or just Juninho in Europe.

He was signed by Kawasaki Frontale in 2008, he then signed a new deal in January 2009.

In July 2018, Júnior joined Siam Navy on a one-year deal.

== Club statistics ==
Club performance			League		Cup		League Cup		Continental		Total	
Season	Club	League	Apps	Goals	Apps	Goals	Apps	Goals	Apps	Goals	Apps	Goals
Japan			League		Emperor's Cup		J.League Cup		Asia		Total	
2008	Kawasaki Frontale	J1 League	15	2	2	1	0	0	-		17	3
2009	Kawasaki Frontale	J1 League	13	3	1	0	0	0	6	0	20	3
2010	Kawasaki Frontale	J1 League	29	7	3	1	4	1	3	0	39	9
Brazil			League		Copa do Brasil		League Cup		South America		Total	
2011	Atlético Clube Goianiense	Série A	28	4	0	0	0	0	0	0	28	4
2012	Corinthians	Série A	0	0	0	0	0	0	0	0	0	0
2012	Botafogo	Série A	4	2	0	0	0	0	0	0	0	0
Country	Japan		57	12	6	2	4	1	9	0	76	15
Country	Brazil		28	4	0	0	0	0	0	0	28	4
Total			57	12	6	2	4	1	9	0	132	23

== Honours ==
Dinamo Zagreb

- Croatian League: 2006

Sport

- Pernambuco State League: 2007

Internacional

- Campeonato Gaúcho: 2013
