= Chumbinho (footballer, born 1986) =

Brazilian footballer (born 1986)

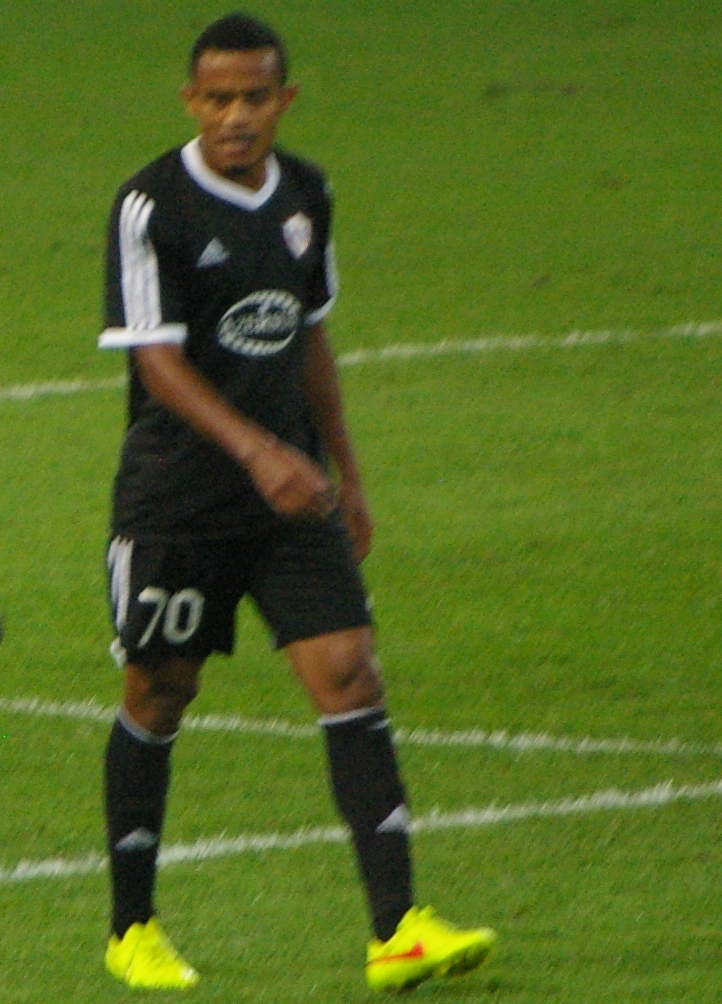

Personal information
- Full name: Marinaldo Cícero da Silva
- Date of birth: September 21, 1986 (age 40)
- Place of birth: Palmares, Brazil
- Height: 1.72 m (5 ft 7 1/2 in)
- Positions: Attacking midfielder; winger

Senior career*
Years	Team	Apps	(Gls)
2005–2006	São Paulo	3	(0)
2006	→ América-SP (loan)	5	(3)
2006	→ Kashima Antlers (loan)	7	(0)
2007	Coritiba	5	(1)
2007	Ponte Preta	4	(0)
2008	Rio Claro	10	(4)
2008–2009	Leixões	19	(2)
2009–2010	Ethnikos Piraeus	36	(13)
2010–2013	Olympiacos	0	(0)
2010–2011	→ Panserraikos (loan)	24	(1)
2011–2012	→ OFI (loan)	13	(1)
2012	→ Levadiakos (loan)	20	(9)
2012–2013	→ Atromitos (loan)	30	(2)
2013–2015	Qarabağ	46	(11)
2015–2016	Atromitos	8	(0)
2016–2018	Levadiakos	34	(3)
2019	Inter de Limeira	16	(2)
2019	Juventude	0	(0)
2019–2020	São Caetano	2	(0)
2020	Taubaté-SP	0	(0)
2020–2021	Kalamata	16	(0)
2022	Ethnikos Piraeus	4	(3)
2022–2023	Hellas Syros		
- * Club domestic league appearances and goals as of 19 June 2021

Marinaldo Cícero da Silva (born 21 September 1986), known as Chumbinho, is a Brazilian professional footballer.

== Career ==
In July 2013, after four years in Greece, Chumbinho signed a two-year contract with Azerbaijan Premier League side Qarabağ. Signing a new two-year contract with Qarabağ in July 2015. On 23 January 2016, the Brazilian midfielder is already in Greece, to complete his deal with Atromitos. he 28-year-old former player of Qarabağ will pass the medical examinations and sign a contract until the summer of 2017 with his new club. On 13 June 2016, he signed a two years' contract with his former club Levadiakos for an undisclosed fee. In November 2018 he was released by the club.

== Honours ==
Qarabağ

- Azerbaijan Premier League (2): 2013–14, 2014-15
- Azerbaijan Cup: (1) 2014-15
